= Harenkarspel =

- Former municipality
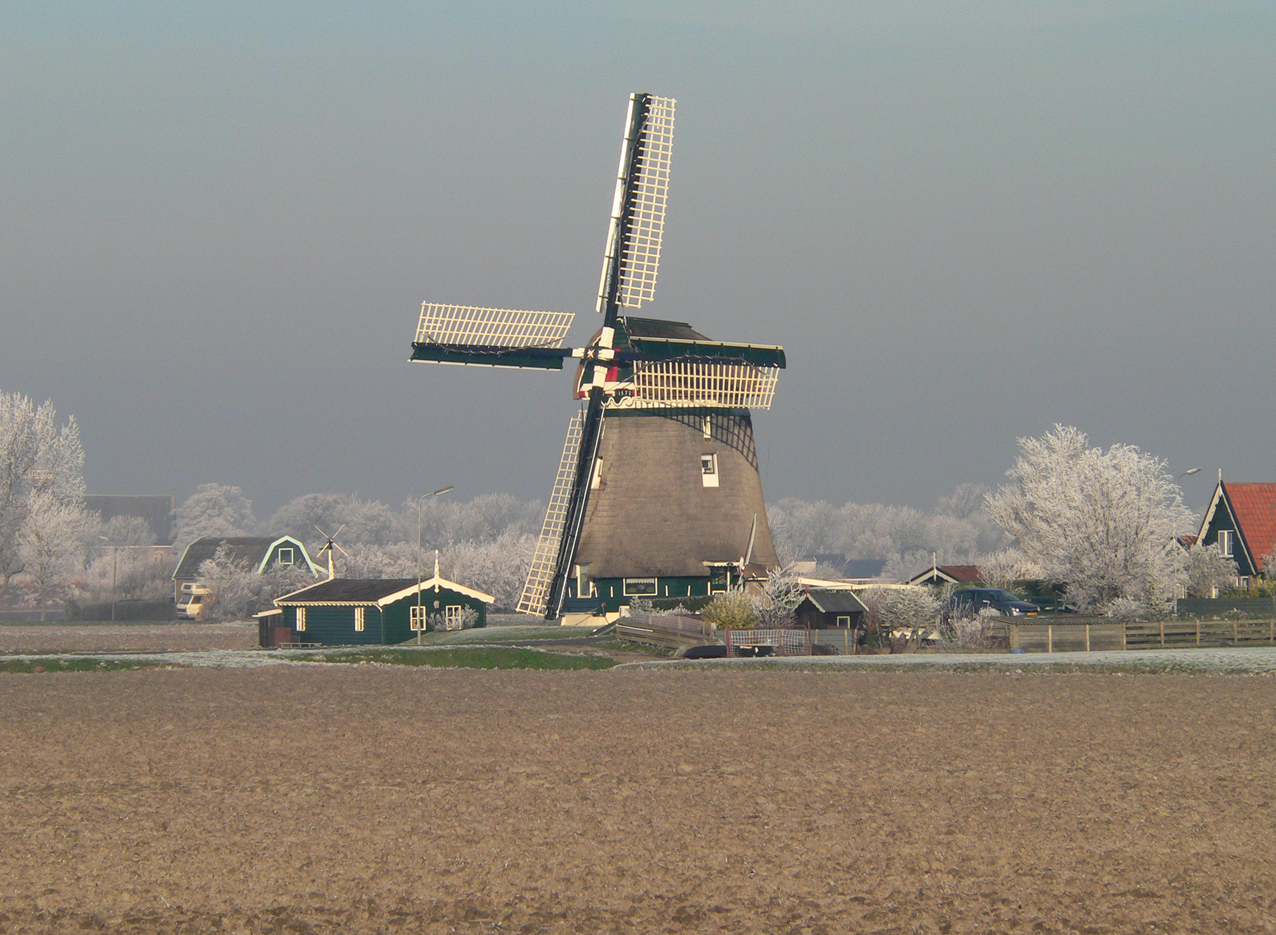

- Flag Coat of arms

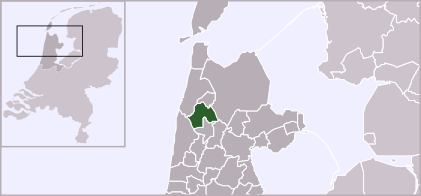
- Coordinates: 52.73°N 4.75°E
- Country: Netherlands
- Province: North Holland
- Municipality: Schagen

Area (2006)
  - Total: 54.83 km^{2} (21.17 sq mi)
  - Land: 54.03 km^{2} (20.86 sq mi)
  - Water: 0.80 km^{2} (0.31 sq mi)

Population (1 January 2007)
  - Total: 15,922
  - Density: 295/km^{2} (760/sq mi)
- Source: CBS, Statline.
- Time zone: UTC+1 (CET)
  - Summer (DST): UTC+2 (CEST)
- Website: www.harenkarspel.nl

Harenkarspel (Dutch pronunciation: [ˈɦaːrə(ŋ)ˌkɑrspəl]) is a former municipality in the Netherlands, in the province of North Holland and the region of West-Frisia. The main town of Harenkarspel was Tuitjenhorn. In 2013, Harenkarspel merged with Schagen and Zijpe into a new municipality, called Schagen.

== Population centres ==
The former municipality of Harenkarspel consisted of the following towns and villages: Dirkshorn, Eenigenburg, Groenveld, Kalverdijk, Kerkbuurt, Krabbendam, 't Rijpje, Schoorldam (partly), Sint Maarten, Stroet, Tuitjenhorn, Valkkoog, Waarland, and Warmenhuizen. Warmenhuizen and Tuitjenhorn were the largest, with the town hall of Harenkarspel located in Tuitjenhorn.

== Local government ==
The municipal council of Harenkarspel consisted of 17 seats, which at the final election in 2010 divided as follows:

- CDA - 5 seats
- PvdA - 4 seats
- VVD - 4 seats
- Algemeen Belang '89 - 2 seats
- Harenkarspel in Beweging - 2 seats

Elections were held in November 2012 for a council for the new merged municipal council of Schagen, which commenced work in January 2013.
