= West Friesland (region) =

Cultural region in North Holland, Netherlands

Coordinates: 52°41′N 5°00′E

West Friesland West-Friesland
- Region
- Flag Coat of arms

- Location of West Friesland (green) in North Holland, Netherlands
- Country: Netherlands
- Province: North Holland
- Largest city: Hoorn

Area
  - Total: 781.80 km^{2} (301.85 sq mi)
  - Land: 507.31 km^{2} (195.87 sq mi)

Population (2024)
  - Total: 413,227
  - Density: 814.55/km^{2} (2,109.7/sq mi)
- Demonyms: West Frisian; Westfries

Religion (2010–2014)
  - No religion: 56.9%
  - Catholicism: 27.9%
  - Protestantism: 7.8%
  - Other: 7.4%
- Dialects: West Frisian Dutch
- Website: regiowestfriesland.nl

West Friesland (Dutch: West-Friesland or Westfriesland), also known as West Frisia, is a cultural region located in the northwest of the Netherlands, in the province of North Holland.

== History ==
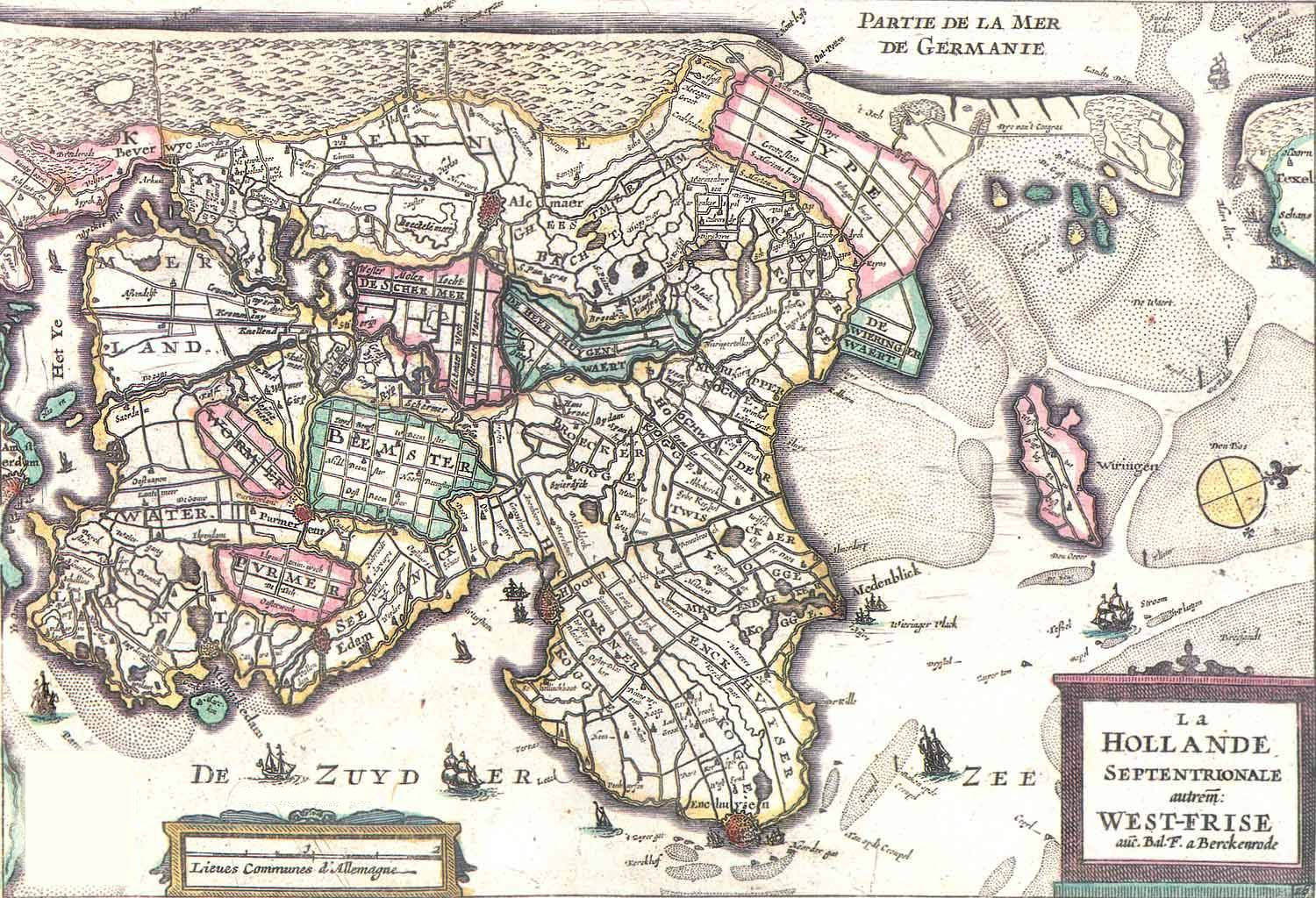
West Friesland in the 17th century

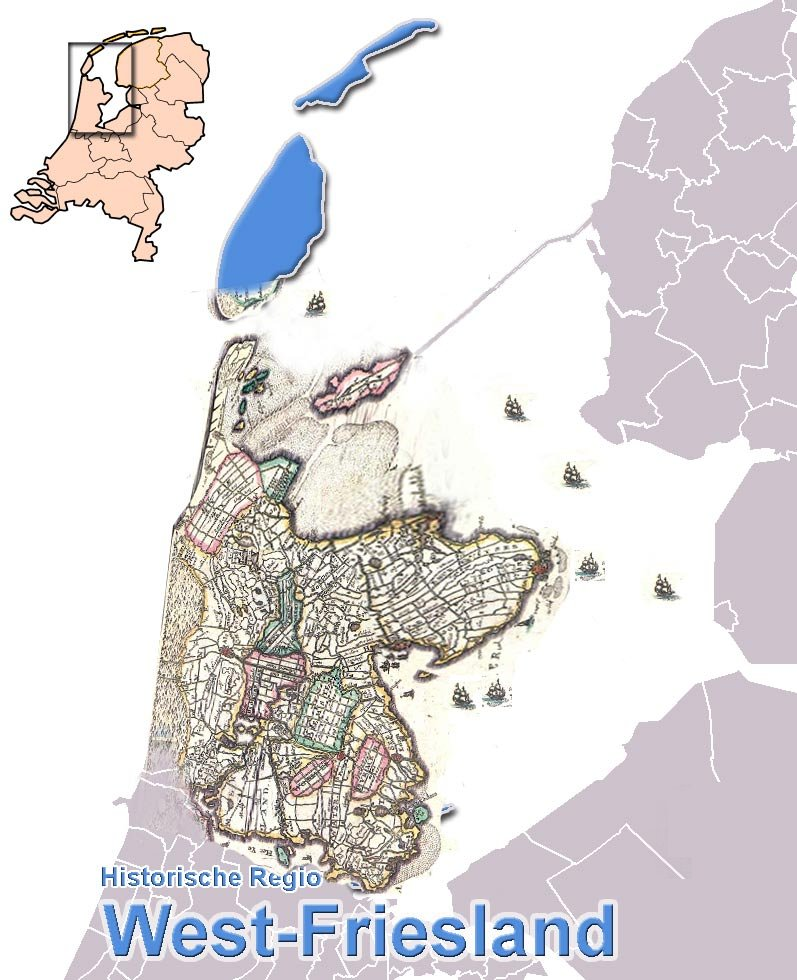
The historical region of West Friesland, mixed map, old map overlaid on a modern geographic map

The River Vlie (also called Fli), is an extension of the IJssel branch of the Rhine river. The river divides the northern Netherlands into two parts, the western and the eastern part. In the eleventh century, heavy rainfall caused the river to flood over large parts of the land. The Zuiderzee bay (previously a lake called Lacus Flevo by Roman authors) was formed, separating West Friesland from the contemporary province of Friesland. In the Middle Ages, the Westflinge area of West Friesland became an island, bordered on the north by the Medem and Zijpe inlets, and to the south by various interconnecting lakes (now polder land) that were connected with the Zuiderzee. Because of this, the toponym "West Friesland" was applied more to the Westflinge area than to the original West Friesland.

For approximately 300 years, West Friesland operated as an autonomous area as the West Frisians did not wish to be vassals of lords from Holland. Floris V, Count of Holland, attempted to unite Holland and West Friesland during his reign and he succeeded in annexing West Frisia. It was his successor, John I, who achieved ultimate victory over the West Frisians in 1297. West Friesland formed a united province with Holland in the Dutch Republic, though it was recognised an autonomous region, and the parliament of said province, commonly known as Holland, was formally known as the States of Holland and West Friesland. During the time of the Dutch Republic, West Friesland had its own independent Admiralty of the Northern Quarter. Any admiral serving within this admiralty or the two other Hollandic admiralties (Amsterdam and the Admiralty of de Maze) had the title of Admiral of Holland and West Frisia.

=== Early medieval Vroonen ===
The first inhabitants of Alkmaar, Oudorp, and St Pancras likely settled along the high beach ridges of the Vroonermeer in the 9th century AD. Better known as Vroonen, this settlement subsequently grew into a village. In the late 13th century, when the Dutch conquered West Frisians, the victors crossed the village and set it on fire. The few surviving inhabitants fled the region. After a long time, people returned to Vroonen and a chapel was built. The village of St Pancras was founded around this church [1484]. Vroonermeer was drained in 1561.

The reclamation of the North Holland lakes was a purely private business affair intended for the establishment of new tracts of fertile land. Investors financed the operation and leased their new land to farmers.

== Geography ==
The exact location of West Friesland is not clearly defined, but it has been suggested that it comprised the area north of an imaginary line through Hoorn and Alkmaar. Within this historical region is the contemporary region of West Friesland, a smaller area based on a dyke system on the Westfriese Omringdijk that lay in West Friesian district (gouw) of Westflinge.

The area between the rivers Vlie and IJ consists of the present-day municipalities of Alkmaar, Amsterdam (Landelijk Noord), Beemster, Bergen, Castricum, Den Helder, Drechterland, Edam-Volendam, Enkhuizen, Heerhugowaard, Heiloo, Hollands Kroon, Hoorn, Koggenland, Landsmeer, Langedijk, Medemblik, Purmerend, Oostzaan, Opmeer, Schagen, Stede Broec, Texel, Uitgeest, Vlieland, Waterland, Wognum, Wormerland, and Zaanstad.

=== Municipalities ===
The region covers an area of about 800 km^{2} (309 sq mi), delineated by the Westfriese Omringdijk. It consists of the following municipalities:

Municipalities of West Friesland
Municipality	Population (2024)	Religion (2010–2014, %)				
Municipality	Population (2024)	Cath.	Prot.	Islam	Other	None
Alkmaar (partially)	55,495 (Note: (a) Combined population of the localities of Daalmeer-Koedijk, De Mare, Huiswaard, Oterleek, Oudorp, and Vroonermeer.)	20.3	7.2	4.8	5.7	62.0
Dijk en Waard	90,076	25.8	9.1	3.2	4.3	57.6
Drechterland	20,496	36.4	7.2	0.0	1.7	54.7
Enkhuizen	18,895	16.1	13.7	3.5	5.6	61.1
Hollands Kroon (partially)	12,655 (Note: (b) Combined population of the localities of Barsingerhorn, Kolhorn, Lutjewinkel, Nieuwe Niedorp, Oude Niedorp, 't Veld, Winkel, and Zijdewind (corresponding to the former municipality of Niedorp).)	24.0	11.8	0.6	2.6	61.0
Hoorn	75,645	19.5	6.7	5.0	7.4	61.4
Koggenland	23,587	49.0	5.1	0.0	1.2	44.7
Medemblik	46,002	37.4	9.2	1.1	3.4	48.9
Opmeer	12,199	56.9	2.6	2.3	1.3	36.9
Schagen (partially)	35,960 (Note: (c) Combined population of the localities of Dirkshorn, Schagen, Sint Maarten, Tuitjenhorn, Waarland, and Warmenhuizen (corresponding to the former municipalities of Harenkarspel and Schagen).)	28.8	7.7	0.8	4.3	58.4
Stede Broec	22,217	29.0	4.7	1.0	6.0	59.3
Total	413,227	27.9	7.8	2.7	4.7	56.9

== Dialect ==
The traditional dialect of the region is the West Frisian dialect of Hollandic Dutch. The contemporary region is similar in size and location to the historical district (gouw) of Westflinge which itself was a part of a much larger historical region of West Friesland.

The West Frisian language has disappeared from the region and the later West Frisian dialects are now slowly disappearing. Although these dialects are subdialects of Hollandic Dutch, they were strongly influenced in vocabulary and grammar by a West Frisian substratum.

== See also ==
- Frisia
- Frisian Islands
- West Frisian Dutch
