= Kalverdijk =

- Hamlet
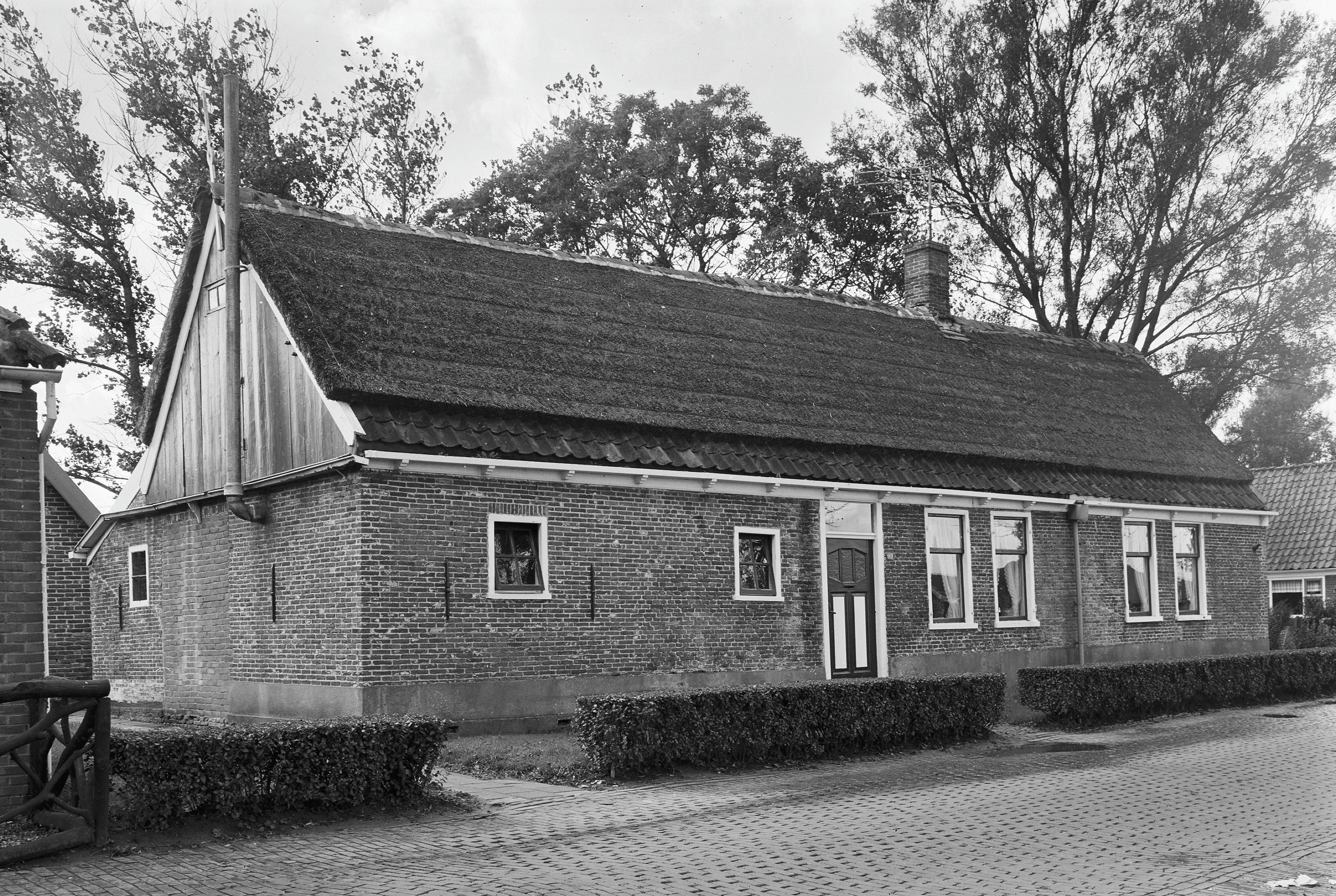
- Farm in Kalverdijk

- Location in the Netherlands Location in the province of North Holland in the Netherlands
- Coordinates: 52°44′N 4°46′E
- Country: Netherlands
- Province: North Holland
- Municipality: Schagen

Area
  - Total: 0.63 km^{2} (0.24 sq mi)
- Elevation: −0.8 m (−2.6 ft)

Population (2025)
  - Total: 335
  - Density: 530/km^{2} (1,400/sq mi)
- Time zone: UTC+1 (CET)
  - Summer (DST): UTC+2 (CEST)
- Postal code: 1747
- Dialing code: 0226

Kalverdijk (West Frisian: Kalveredìk) is a hamlet in the Dutch province of North Holland. It is a part of the municipality of Schagen, and lies about 8 km north of Heerhugowaard.

The hamlet was first mentioned in 1575 as Caluerdyck, and is a combination of dike and calf. Kalverdijk has place name signs. It is considered part of Tuitjenhorn, and consists of about 105 houses and 70 holiday homes.
