= Kerkbuurt, Schagen =

Kerkbuurt Tjerkebuur
- Town
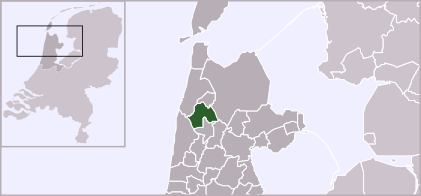

- Kerkbuurt in the former municipality of Harenkarspel.
- Coordinates: 52°44′N 4°45′E
- Country: Netherlands
- Province: North Holland
- Municipality: Schagen
- Time zone: UTC+1 (CET)
  - Summer (DST): UTC+2 (CEST)

Kerkbuurt (West Frisian: Tjerkebuur) is a town in the Dutch province of North Holland. It is a part of the municipality of Schagen, and lies about 9 km northwest of Heerhugowaard.
