= Fabian Plak =

Dutch volleyball player (born 1997)

Personal information
- Born: 23 July 1997 (age 29); Tuitjenhorn, Netherlands
- Height: 1.98 m (6 ft 6 in)
- Weight: 92 kg (203 lb)
- Education: Johan Cruyff Institute

Volleyball information
- Position: Middle blocker
- Current club: ZAKSA Kędzierzyn-Koźle
- Number: 8

Career
Years	Teams
2017–2018; 2019; 2019–2020; 2020–2021; 2021–2023; 2023–2025; 2025–2026; 2026–	Volley Schönenwerd; Saaremaa VK; CV Teruel; Grand Nancy VB; Chaumont VB 52; Pallavolo Padova; Cisterna Volley; ZAKSA Kędzierzyn-Koźle

National team
Netherlands

Fabian Plak (born 23 July 1997) is a Dutch professional volleyball player who plays as a middle blocker for ZAKSA Kędzierzyn-Koźle and the Netherlands national team.

He participated in the 2017 European Volleyball Championship.

== Personal life ==
Plak was born in Tuitjenhorn, son of Surinamese kickboxing world champion Kenneth and Dutch volleyball player Karin. He has an older sister, Celeste, who also plays volleyball. Plak attended the Johan Cruyff Institute in Nijmegen.
