= 't Rijpje =

- Hamlet
- Location in the Netherlands Location in the province of North Holland in the Netherlands
- Coordinates: 52°45′07″N 4°44′51″E
- Country: Netherlands
- Province: North Holland
- Municipality: Schagen

Area
  - Total: 1.45 km^{2} (0.56 sq mi)
- Elevation: −0.7 m (−2.3 ft)

Population (2025)
  - Total: 135
  - Density: 93.1/km^{2} (241/sq mi)
- Time zone: UTC+1 (CET)
  - Summer (DST): UTC+2 (CEST)
- Postal code: 1744
- Dialing code: 0224

't Rijpje or Rijpje or is a hamlet in the Dutch province of North Holland. It is a part of the municipality of Schagen.

't Rijpje is considered part of Eenigenburg. It has place name signs.
