= Kerkbuurt =

Kerkbuurt may refer to a number of Dutch villages:

- Kerkbuurt, Andijk in North Holland, near Andijk
- Kerkbuurt, Marken in North Holland, on Marken
- Kerkbuurt, Schagen in North Holland
- Kerkbuurt, Schiedam in South Holland, near Schiedam
