= Eenigenburg =

- Village
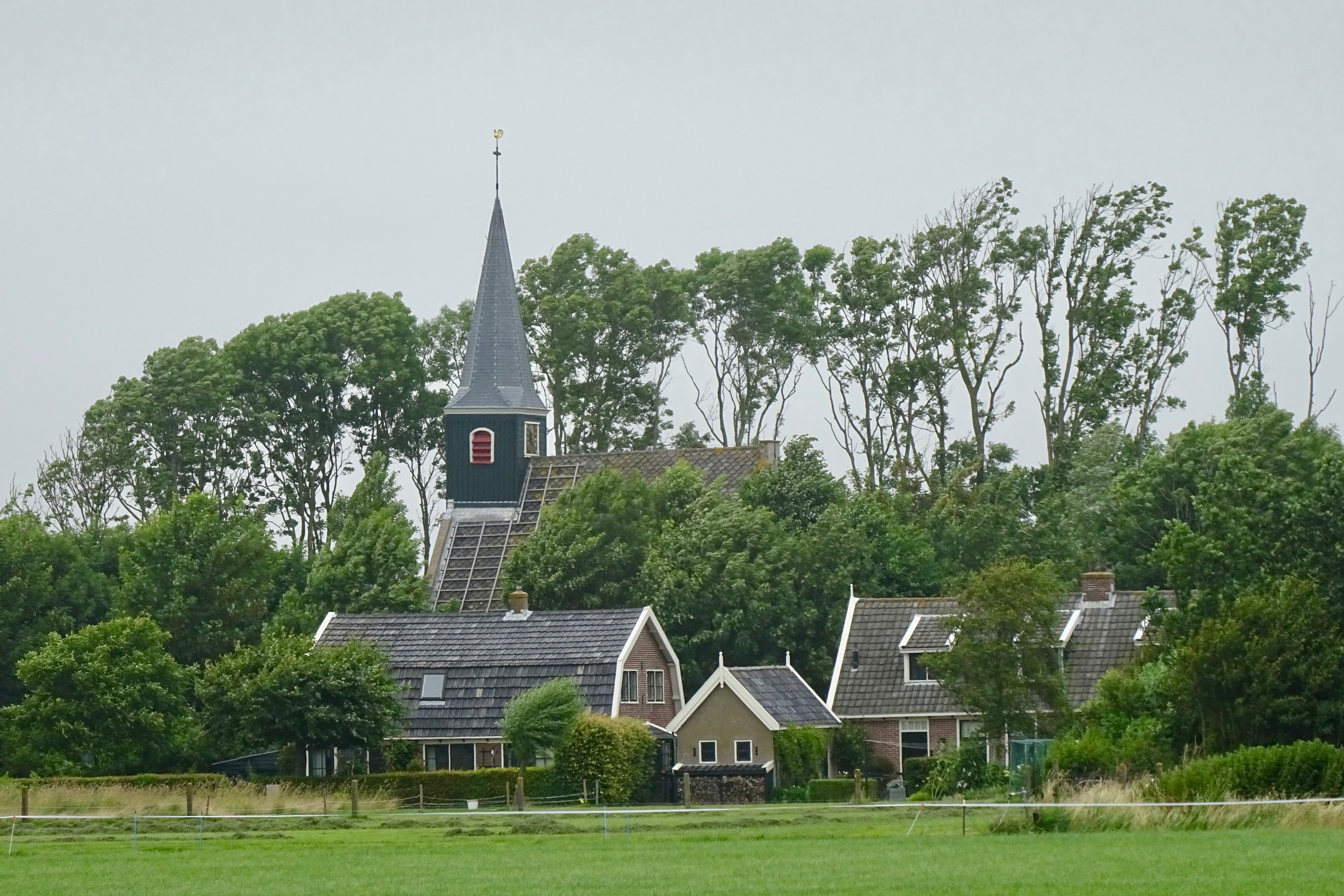
- View on Eenigenbrug

- Location in the Netherlands Location in the province of North Holland in the Netherlands
- Coordinates: 52°45′N 4°44′E
- Country: Netherlands
- Province: North Holland
- Municipality: Schagen

Area
  - Total: 3.19 km^{2} (1.23 sq mi)
- Elevation: −0.7 m (−2.3 ft)

Population (2025)
  - Total: 165
  - Density: 51.7/km^{2} (134/sq mi)
- Time zone: UTC+1 (CET)
  - Summer (DST): UTC+2 (CEST)
- Postal code: 1744
- Dialing code: 0224

Eenigenburg (Dutch pronunciation: [ˈeːnəɣə(m)ˌbʏr(ə)x]; West Frisian: Einigeborgt) is a village in the Dutch province of North Holland and the region of West-Frisia. It is a part of the municipality of Schagen, and lies about 10 km northwest of Heerhugowaard.

The village was first mentioned in 1289 as Eimhborch, and means "lonely/abandoned castle" which is a reference to Nieuwendoorn Castle built by Floris V, Count of Holland in 1282 during his war against West-Frisia. The castle was probably destroyed by a flood in the 14th century. There are multiple terps (artificial living hills) around Eenigenburg. The village itself is built on four terps.

The Dutch Reformed church dates 1792 and is on its own terp from the 14th century together with the clergy house. The church is no longer in service, and is used for cultural activities and concerts.

== Gallery ==
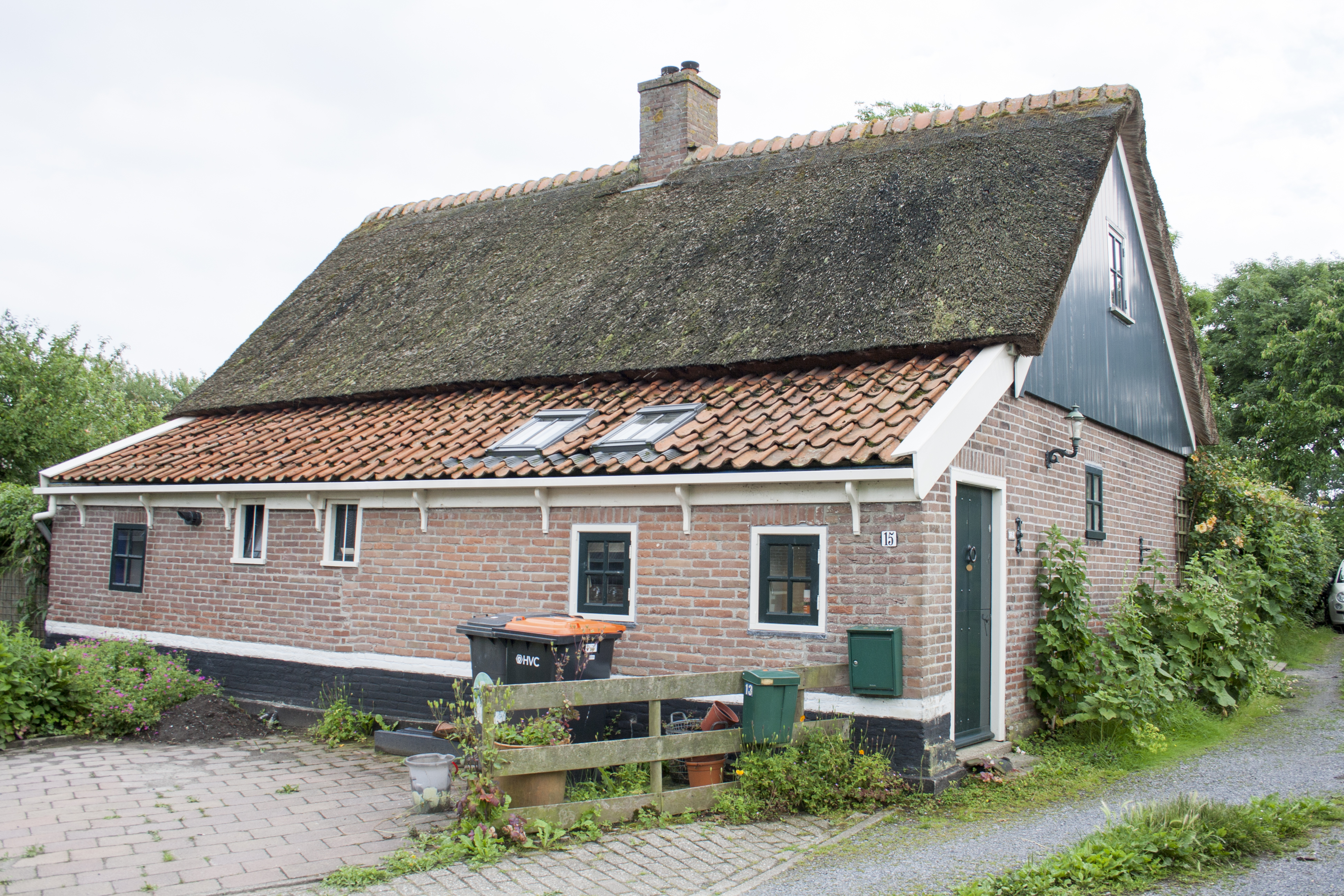
Farm in Eenigenburg

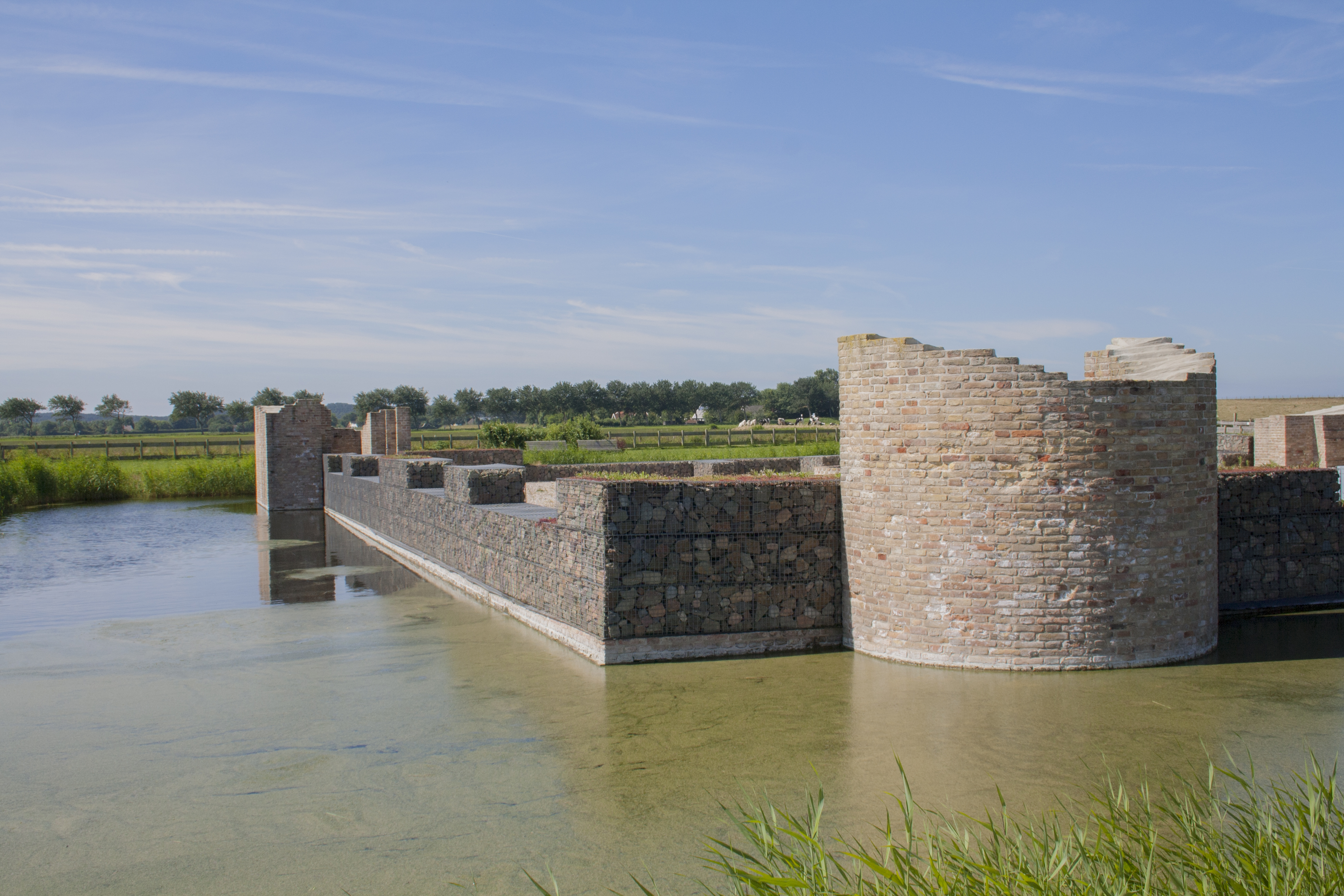
Ruins of Nieuwendoorn Castle

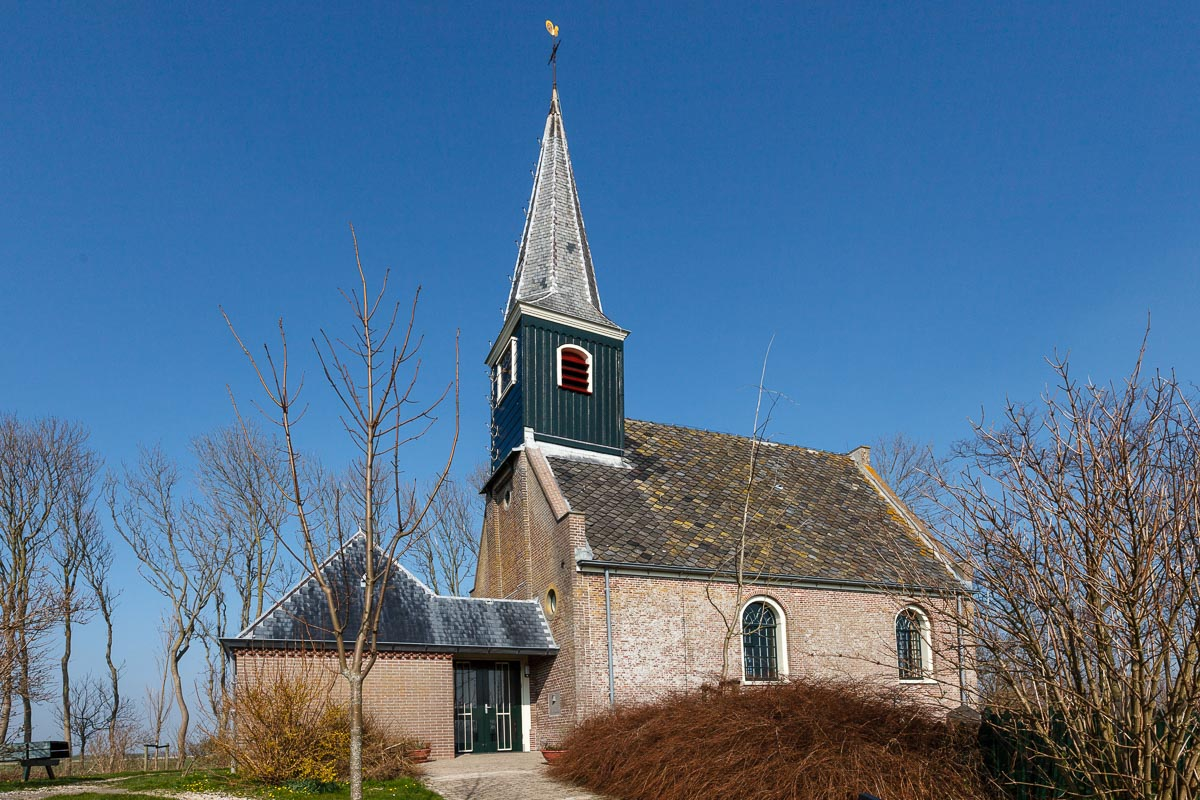
Dutch Reformed church

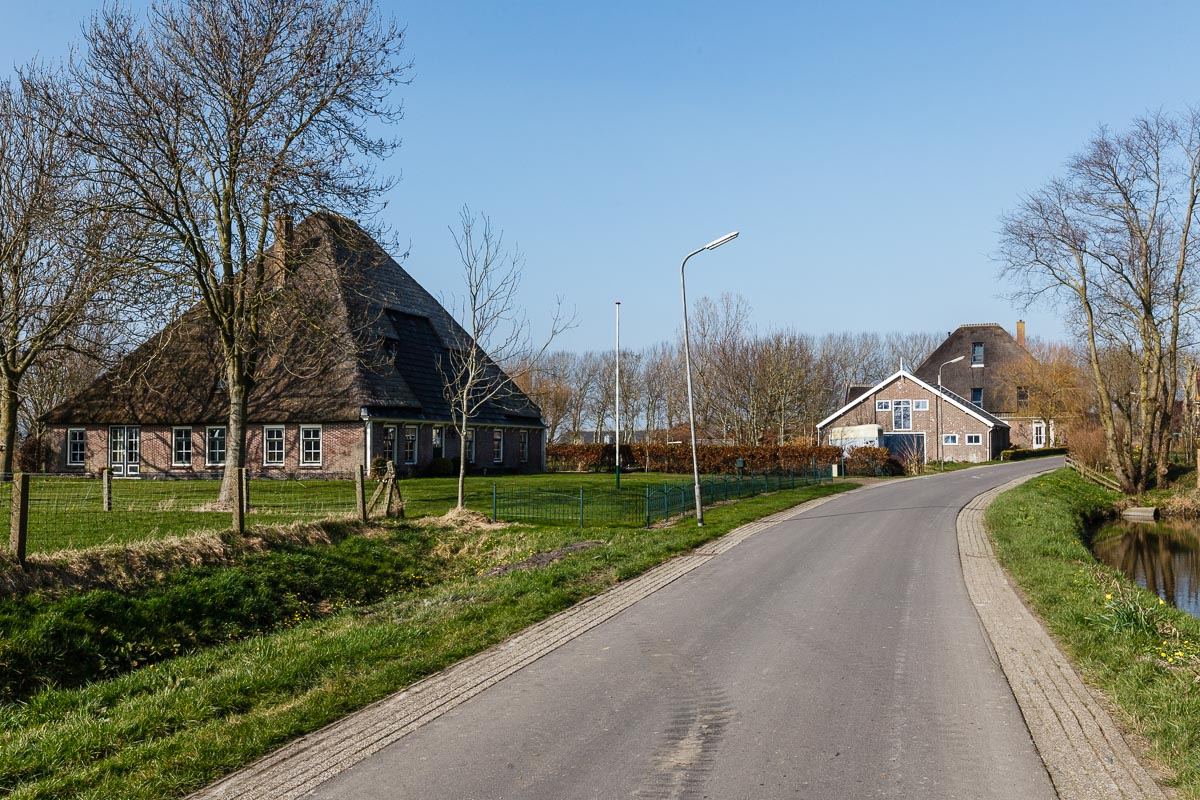
Street view
