= Goat's foot =

Goat's foot is a common name for several plants and may refer to:

- Ipomoea pes-caprae
- Oxalis pes-caprae

A goat's foot may also refer to a type of reloading mechanism for a crossbow.

It is also the literal translation for the Dutch biscuit: Bokkenpootje
