= Valkkoog =

- Village
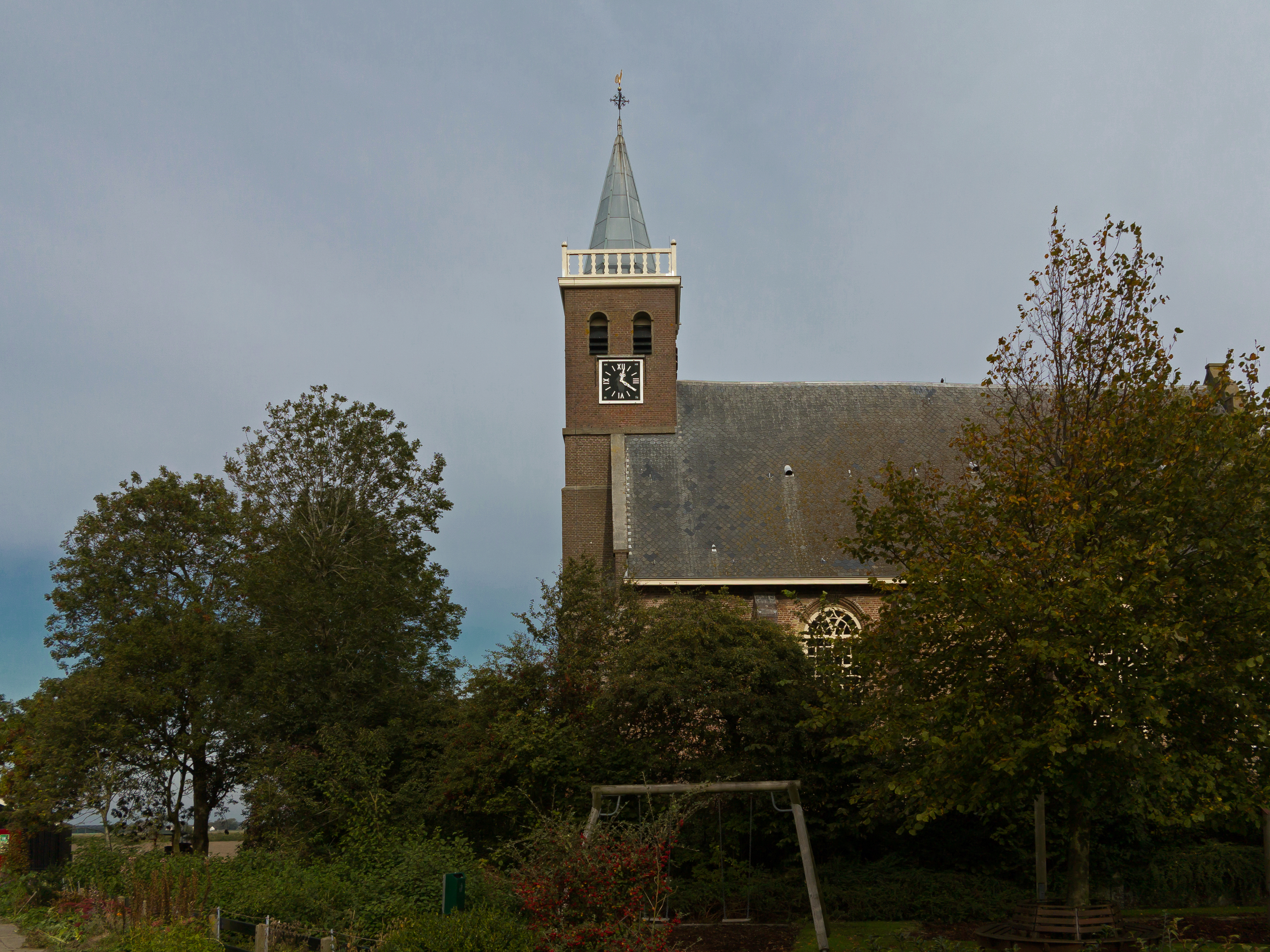
- Dutch Reformed church

- Location in the Netherlands Location in the province of North Holland in the Netherlands
- Coordinates: 52°47′N 4°46′E
- Country: Netherlands
- Province: North Holland
- Municipality: Schagen

Area
  - Total: 1.63 km^{2} (0.63 sq mi)
- Elevation: −0.7 m (−2.3 ft)

Population (2025)
  - Total: 130
  - Density: 80/km^{2} (210/sq mi)
- Time zone: UTC+1 (CET)
  - Summer (DST): UTC+2 (CEST)
- Postal code: 1744
- Dialing code: 0224

Valkkoog (West Frisian: Falkekoeghe) is a village in the Dutch province of North Holland. It is a part of the municipality of Schagen, and lies about 12 km north of Heerhugowaard.

The village was first mentioned in 1318 as Valkencoech, and means "(settlement on) land near water of the Valke (person)". Valkkoog was constructed on four terps (artificial hills) which date from around 1170. The monks of Egmond Abbey have later built a dike around the village. The church dates from the early 16th century, and is nowadays used for cultural activities. The church was rebuilt in 1839, and the tower was replaced in 1865. During World War II, more than 40 bunkers were built near the village by the Germans of which six still remain.

== Gallery ==
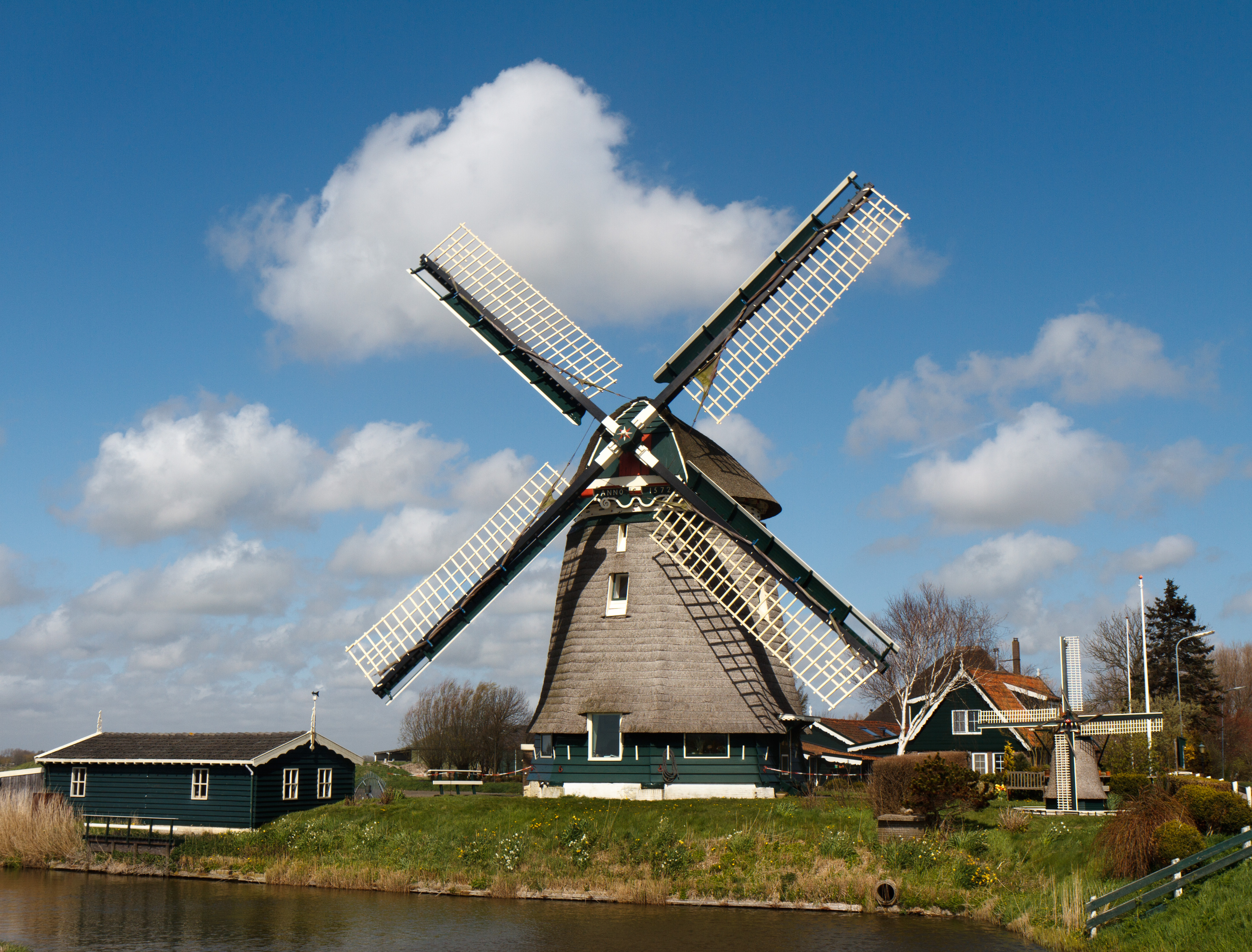
Windmill De Groenvelder

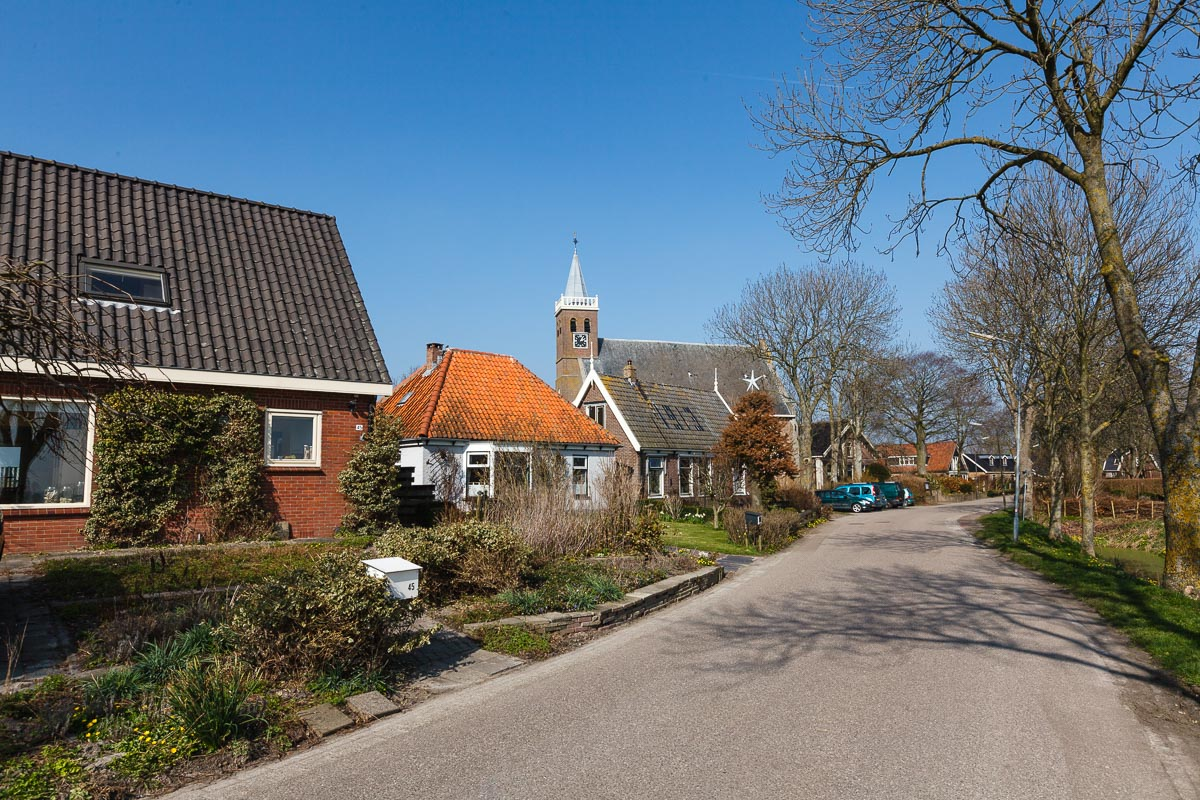
View on Valkkoog
