= Sint Maarten, North Holland =

Sint Maarten
- Village
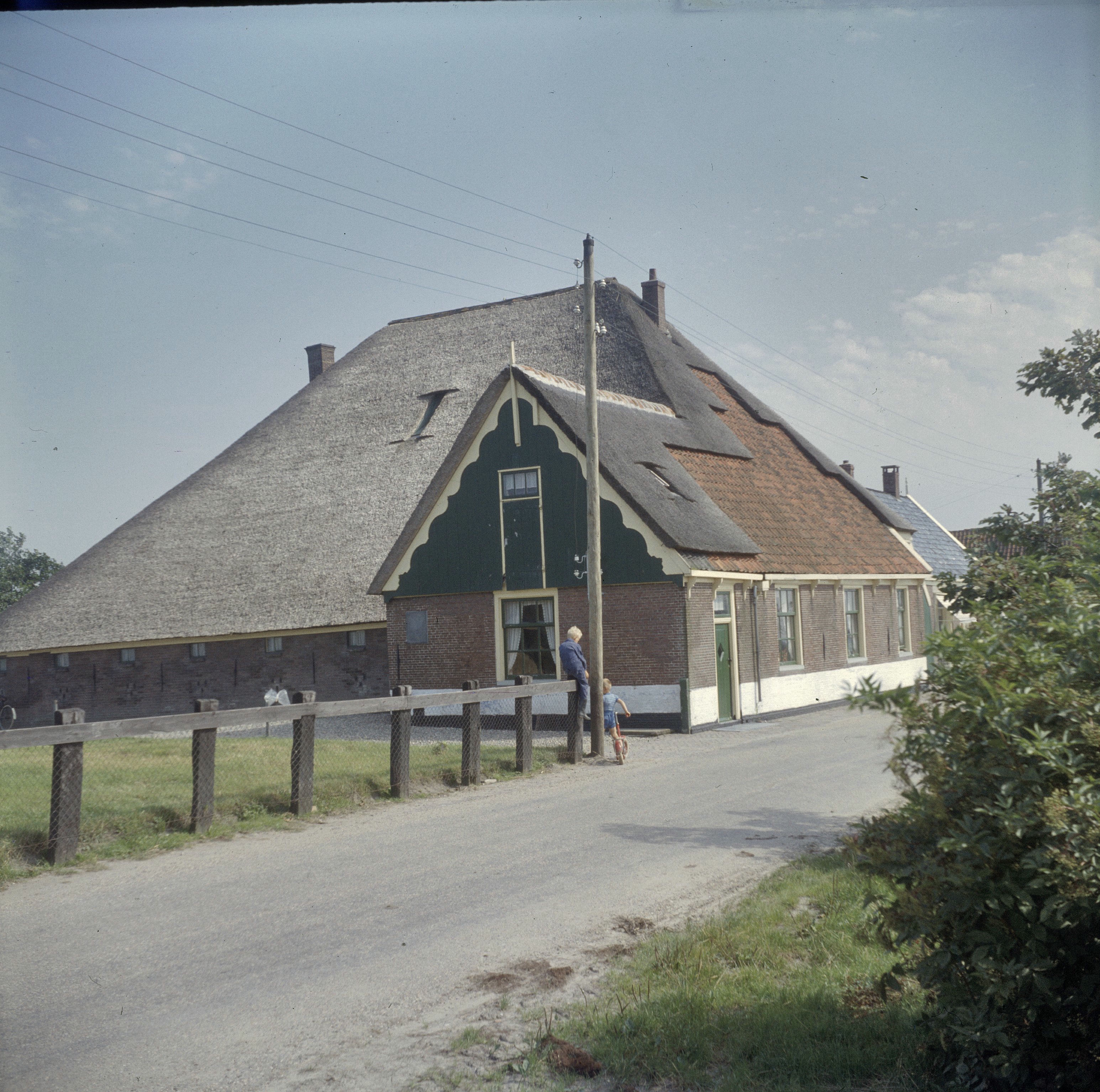
- Farm in Sint Maarten

- Flag Coat of arms

- Location in the Netherlands Location in the province of North Holland in the Netherlands
- Coordinates: 52°46′N 4°45′E
- Country: Netherlands
- Province: North Holland
- Municipality: Schagen

Area
  - Village: 2.98 km^{2} (1.15 sq mi)
- Elevation: −0.7 m (−2.3 ft)

Population (2025)
  - Village: 1,045
  - Density: 351/km^{2} (908/sq mi)
  - Urban: 985
  - Rural: 60
- Time zone: UTC+1 (CET)
  - Summer (DST): UTC+2 (CEST)
- Postal code: 1744
- Dialing code: 0224

Sint Maarten (West Frisian: Simmer) is a village in the Dutch province of North Holland. It is a part of the municipality of Schagen, and lies about 15 km north of Alkmaar.

The village was first mentioned in 1289 as Niwelant. The current name is a reference to Martin of Tours. Sint Maarten developed in the 13th century along the West-Frisian sea dike. A church was built in 1462, but was destroyed in 1799. In 1875, a new church was built and demolished in 1960.

Sint Maarten was home to 246 people in 1840. It was a separate municipality until 1990, when it was merged with Harenkarspel. Harenkarspel merged with Schagen in 2013.
