= Bokkenpootje =

Type of meringue cookie in the Netherlands

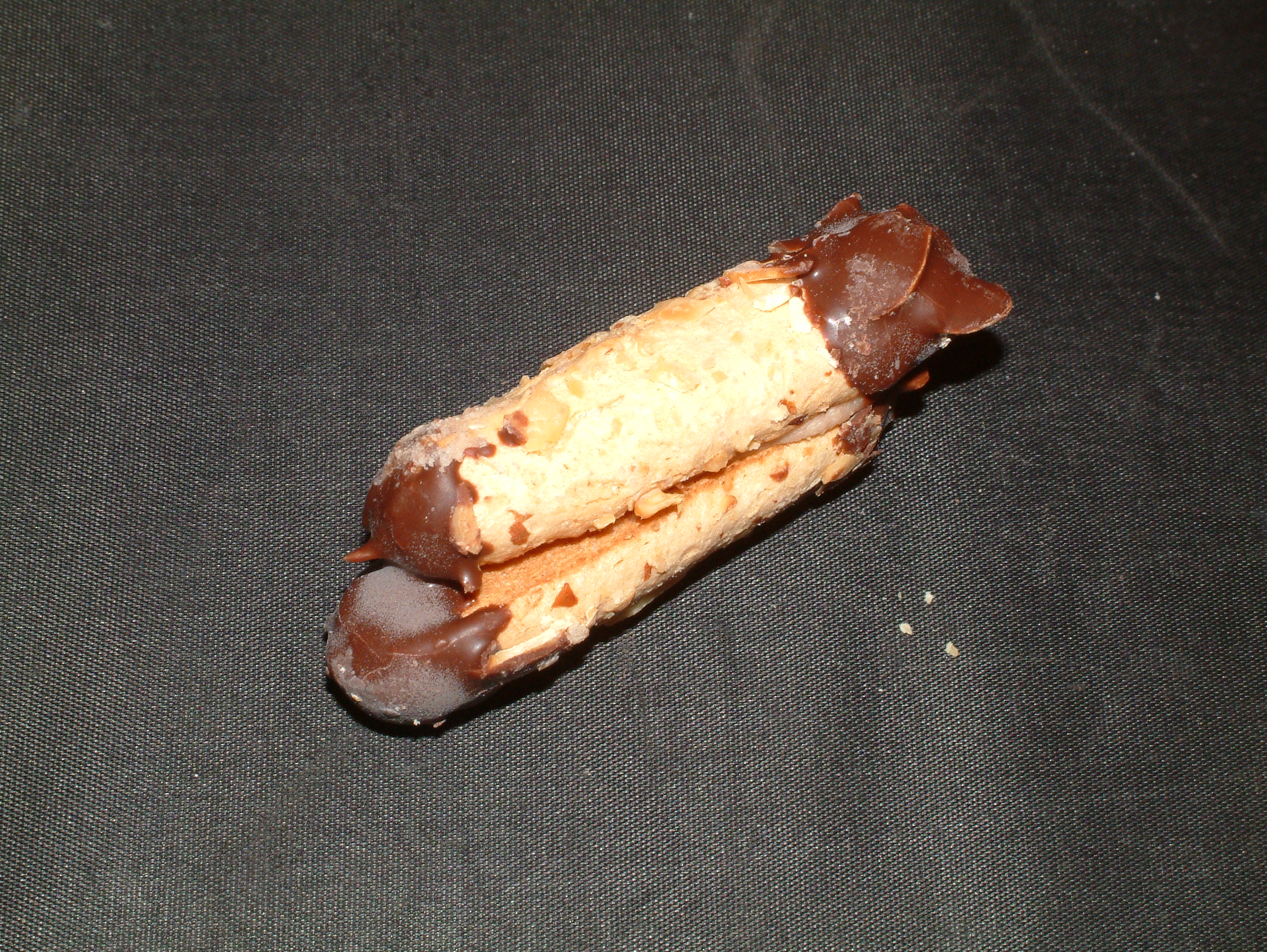
- Alternative names: Bokkepootje
- Type: cookie
- Place of origin: North Holland (Netherlands)
- Main ingredients: meringue, buttercream, dark chocolate

Bokkenpootje (Dutch pronunciation: [ˈbɔkə(n)ˌpoːcə], literally "goat's foot") is a traditional Dutch cookie consisting of two elongated almond meringue cookies sandwiched together with buttercream filling and dipped in chocolate at both ends. The distinctive shape resembles goat's hooves, hence the name. The cookies are characterized by contrasting textures: crunchy exterior from the meringue base and chocolate coating, with soft interior from the cream filling. Preparation involves creating an almond-based meringue mixture, piping into log-shaped forms, baking until crisp, pipe a line of buttercream filling in the centre of one biscuit and sandwich a second biscuit on top, and dipping ends in melted chocolate. Variations include almond paste, apricot jam, or custard cream fillings.

== History ==
Bokkenpootjes have been a staple of Dutch confectionery for many decades. They originated in Tuitjenhorn, North Holland, from the bakery of Jan Pieter Schellema. The story goes that around 1859, the local pastor commissioned Schellema to create the recipe. These pastries symbolize the devil's hooves, and eating them was believed to protect the deceased from evil in the afterlife during an annual vigil at the local cemetery.
