= Johan's Ark =

Reconstruction of Noah's Ark, Netherlands

Coordinates: 51°49′8.84″N 4°41′6.24″E

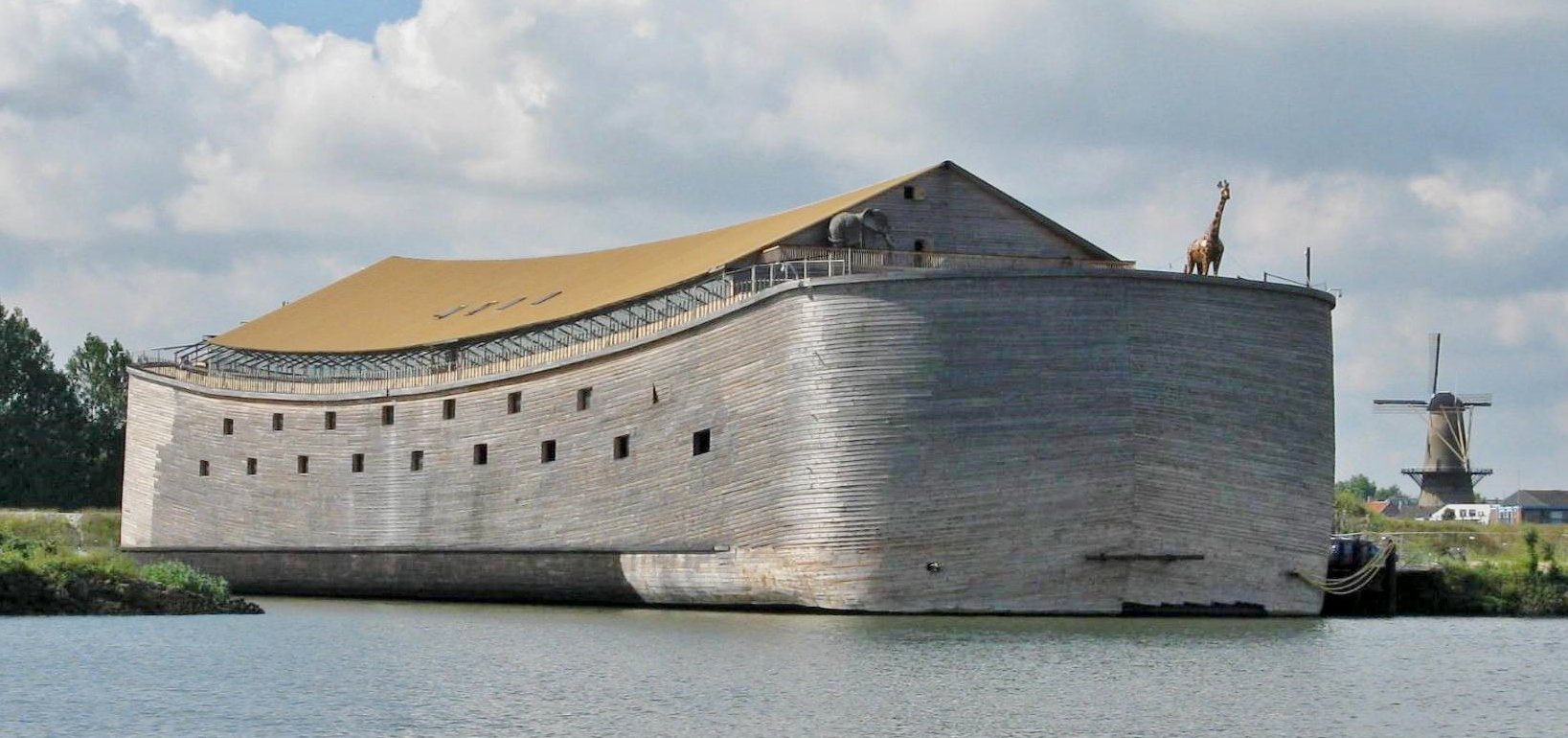
Johan's Ark in Dordrecht, Netherlands

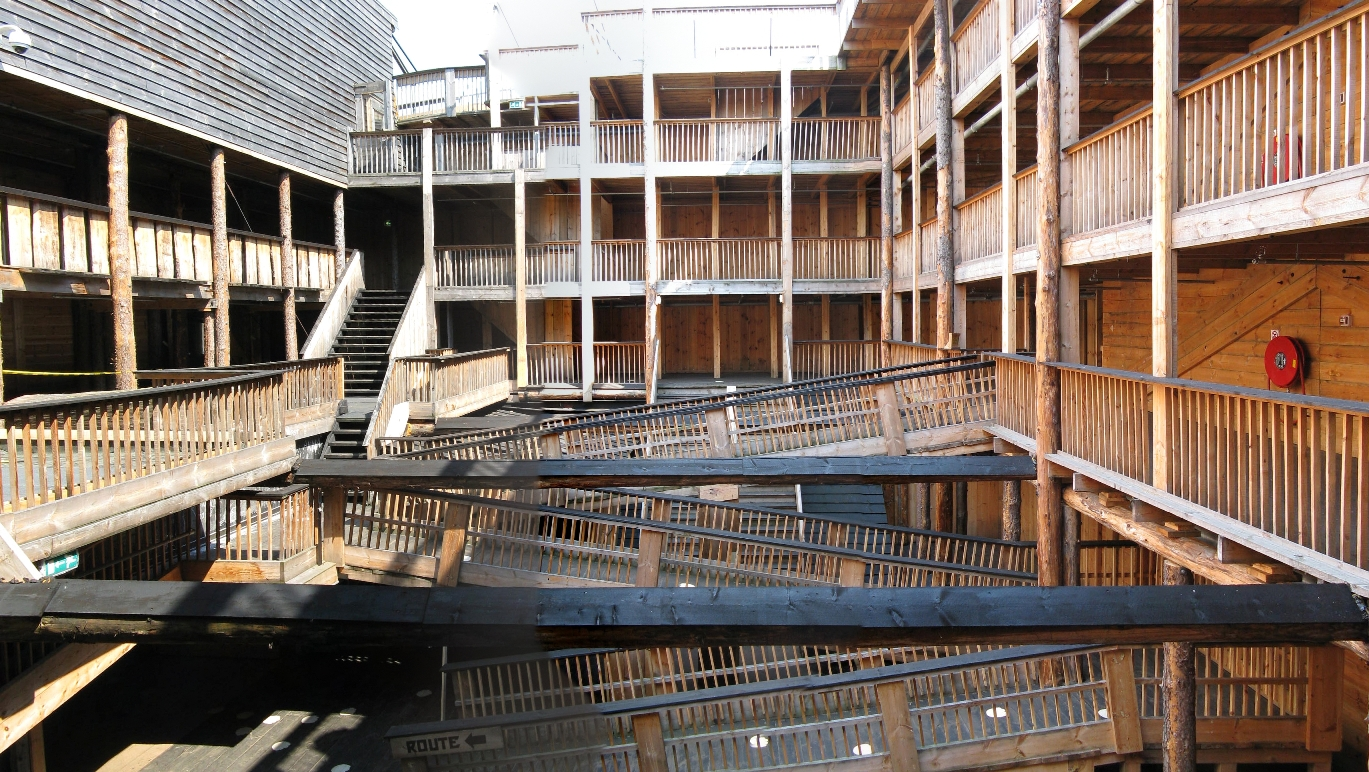
Amphitheatre in Johan's Ark

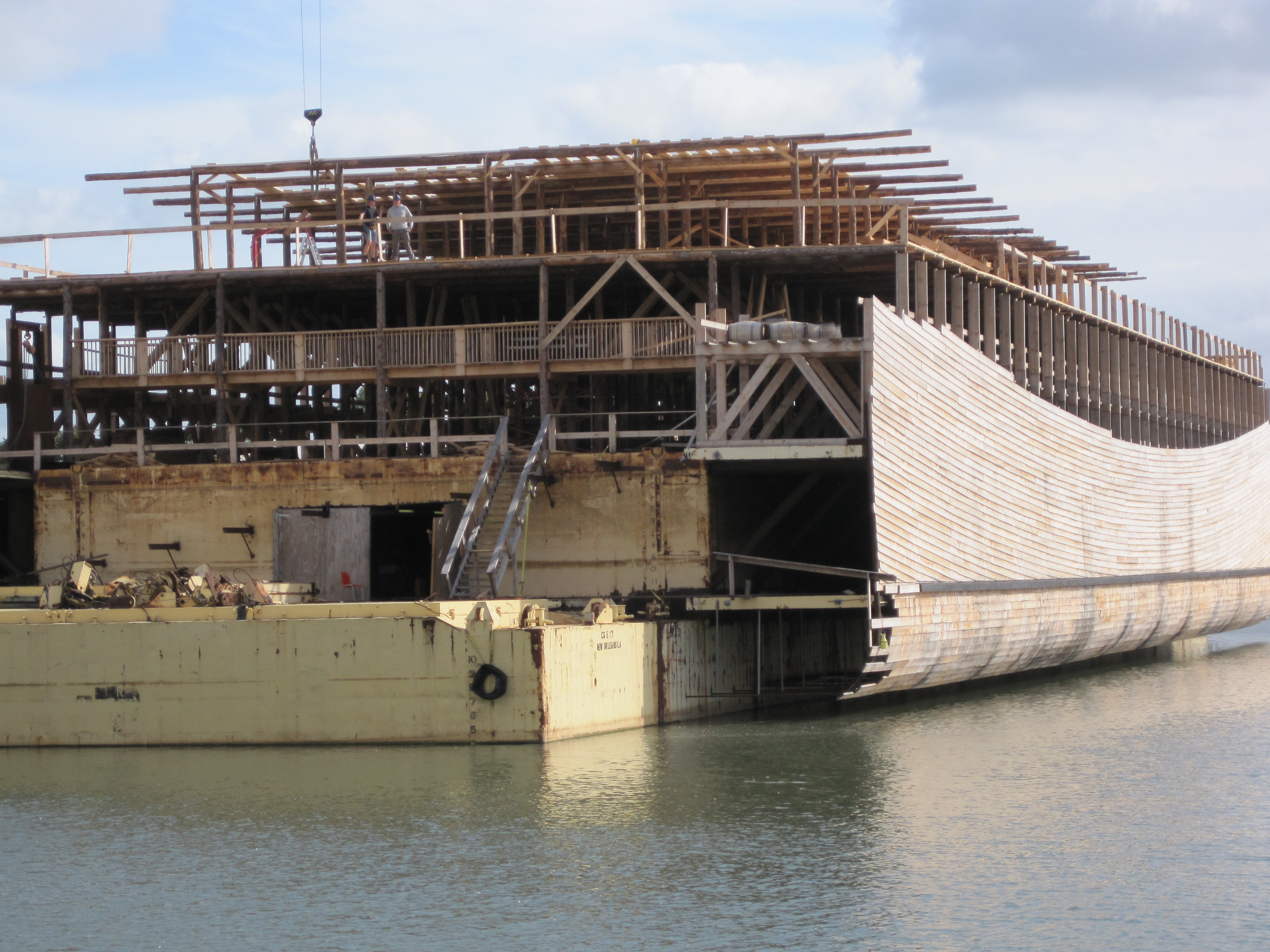
Floating core composed of LASH barges visible during construction

Johan's Ark is a Noah's Ark-themed barge in Dordrecht, Netherlands, which was built by the Dutch building contractor, carpenter and creationist Johan Huibers. It is a full-scale interpretation of the biblical Ark, featuring animal models, including cows, penguins, a crocodile, and a giraffe. It opened to the public in 2012.

== Construction ==
Huibers built his ark with eight helpers in four years. It is divided in seven stories. The wooden construction is carried on a hidden floating platform from steel made up of 21 LASH barges. Previously the LASH barges were cargo containers, towed or pushed as floating barges over inland waterways, while carried on large ships over rough seas. Hence the ark can be towed by tugboats over the rivers, but it is not seaworthy. It could travel the seas on top of a pontoon or transport ship. The wood volume is equivalent to 12000 trees. While the Bible specified that the Ark had to be built from the unknown gopher wood, this ark is made of American Cedar and Pine. The ark is 119m (390 ft or 266 cubits) long, 30m (98 ft or 66 cubits) wide, and 23m (75 ft or 50 cubits) high. The cost of building it was 4 million euros.

== Half-scale version ==
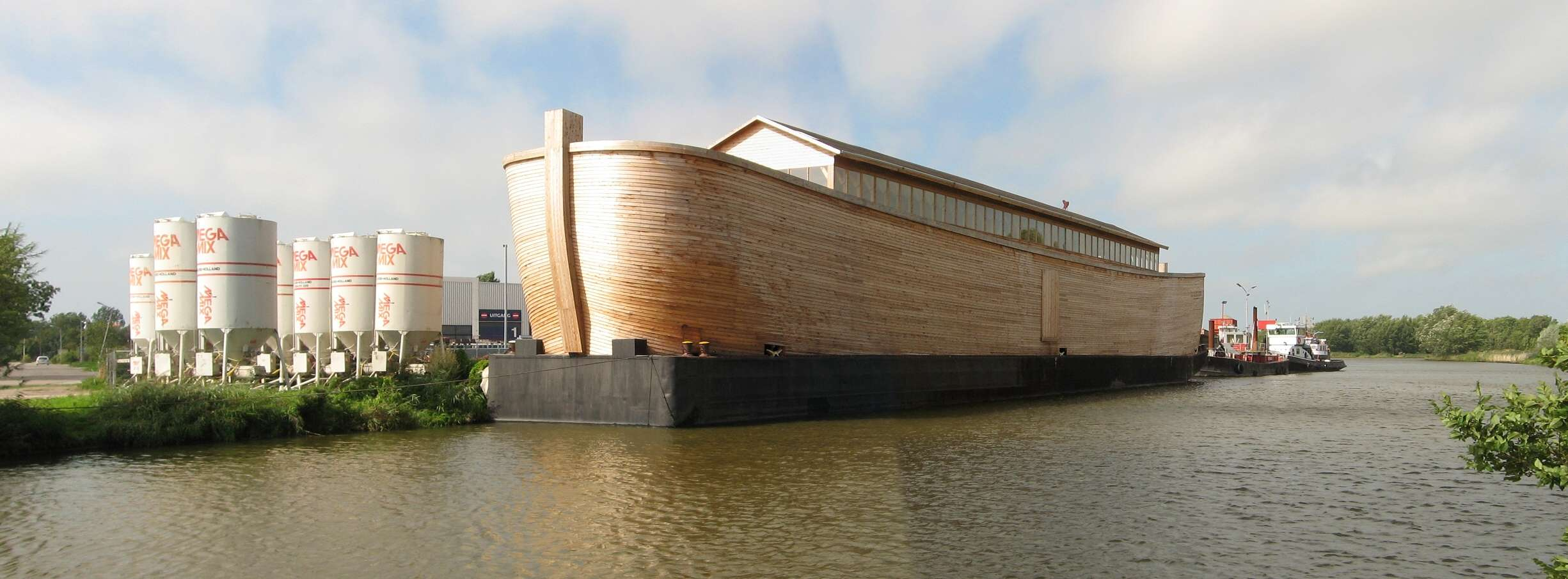
Earlier half-scale version

A few years earlier Huibers built a half-scale interpretation of the Ark, in the river port of Schagen, 50 km north of Amsterdam. Huibers did the work mostly with his own hands, using modern tools and occasional help from his son, in one and a half years. Its size, adapted for sailing the Dutch canals and locks, was 70 metres (230 ft) long, 9.5 metres (31 ft) wide, and 13 metres (43 ft) high. The cost to build was 1 million euro. In 2007 Huibers opened the doors to visitors. After a few months the vessel was towed by tugboat through the canals and moored in 21 harbors in the Netherlands. The ark was sold to Dutch artist Aad Peters in 2010. He tours through Germany, Denmark and Norway. Although the ark isn't really seaworthy and can't handle waves higher than two meters, it was successfully towed across the sea from Denmark to Norway. On 10 June 2016, the ark collided with a moored vessel (NoCGV Nornen) while under tow in Oslo harbor. The ark suffered severe damage to its wooden cladding.

=== Visit to Ipswich ===
In November 2019 Aad Peters brought the Ark to Ipswich, Suffolk. He explained that this was because of Brexit. He explained that he felt that the story of the Judgment of Solomon was important when faced with the sort of social division such as experienced around Brexit. Shortly after arriving in Ipswich the vessel was impounded in the dock by coastguard officers because "load line certificates [were] missing, no tonnage information, and a range of other concerns." In June 2021 the vessel was still being detained in Ipswich due to “serious concerns” about its condition and seaworthiness. It was released on the 1st of July, and it reached Vlissingen in the Netherlands five days later.

== See also ==
- Flood myth and List of flood myths
- Noah's Ark replicas and derivatives
