= Waarland =

- Village
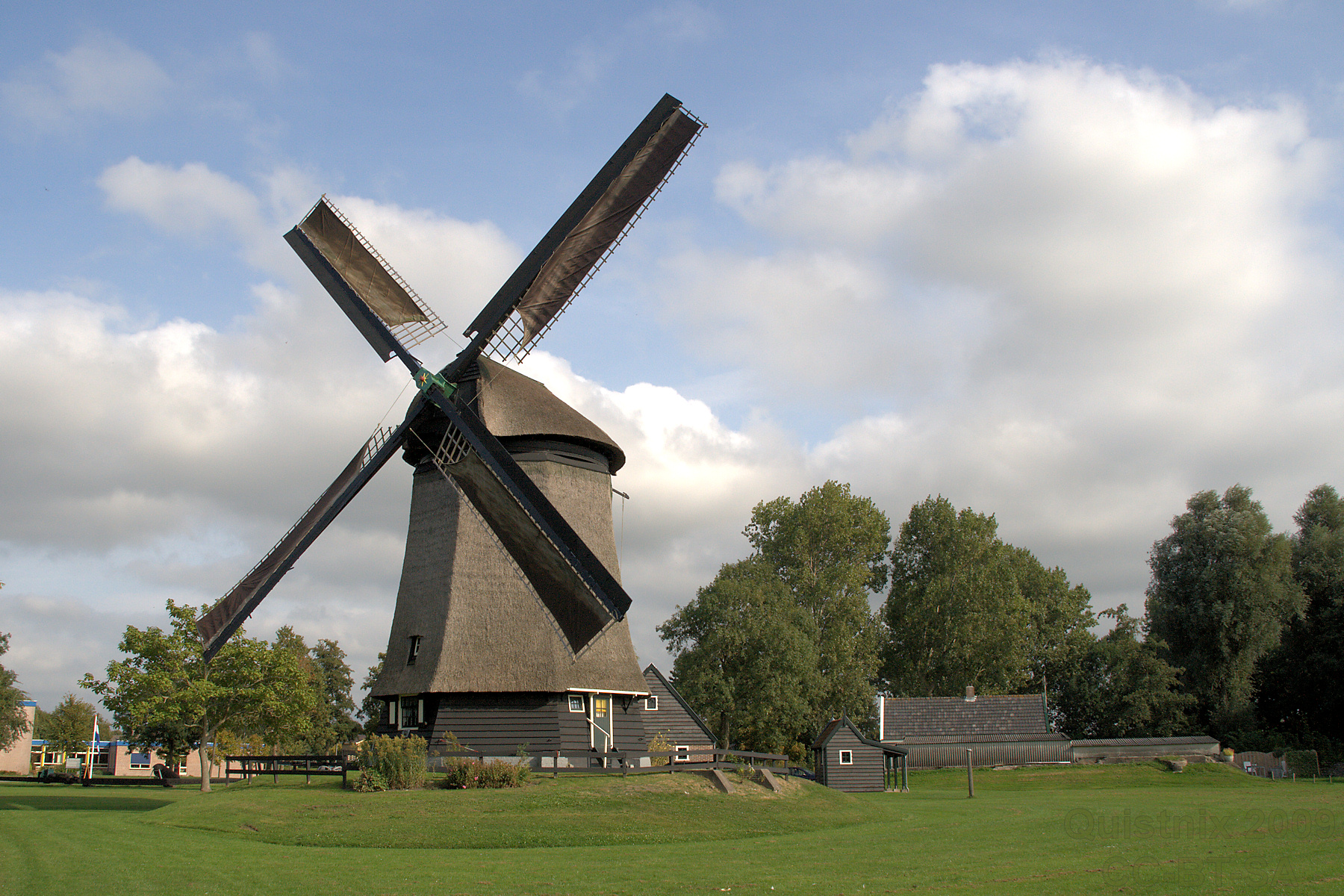
- Polder mill near Waarland

- Location in the Netherlands Location in the province of North Holland in the Netherlands
- Coordinates: 52°44′N 4°50′E
- Country: Netherlands
- Province: North Holland
- Municipality: Schagen

Area
  - Village: 9.92 km^{2} (3.83 sq mi)
- Elevation: −1.0 m (−3.3 ft)

Population (2025)
  - Village: 2,720
  - Density: 274/km^{2} (710/sq mi)
  - Urban: 2,165
  - Rural: 550
- Time zone: UTC+1 (CET)
  - Summer (DST): UTC+2 (CEST)
- Postal code: 1738
- Dialing code: 0226

Waarland (West Frisian: ´t Waarland) is a village in the Dutch province of North Holland. It is a part of the municipality of Schagen, and lies about 6 km north of Heerhugowaard.

The village was first mentioned in 1665 as "De Waedt Polder", and originally meant "polder enclosed by waterways". The polder mill Waarland was built around 1532. It was in service until 1949 when a pumping station was installed. The windmill was restored in 2017.
