= Stroet =

- Village
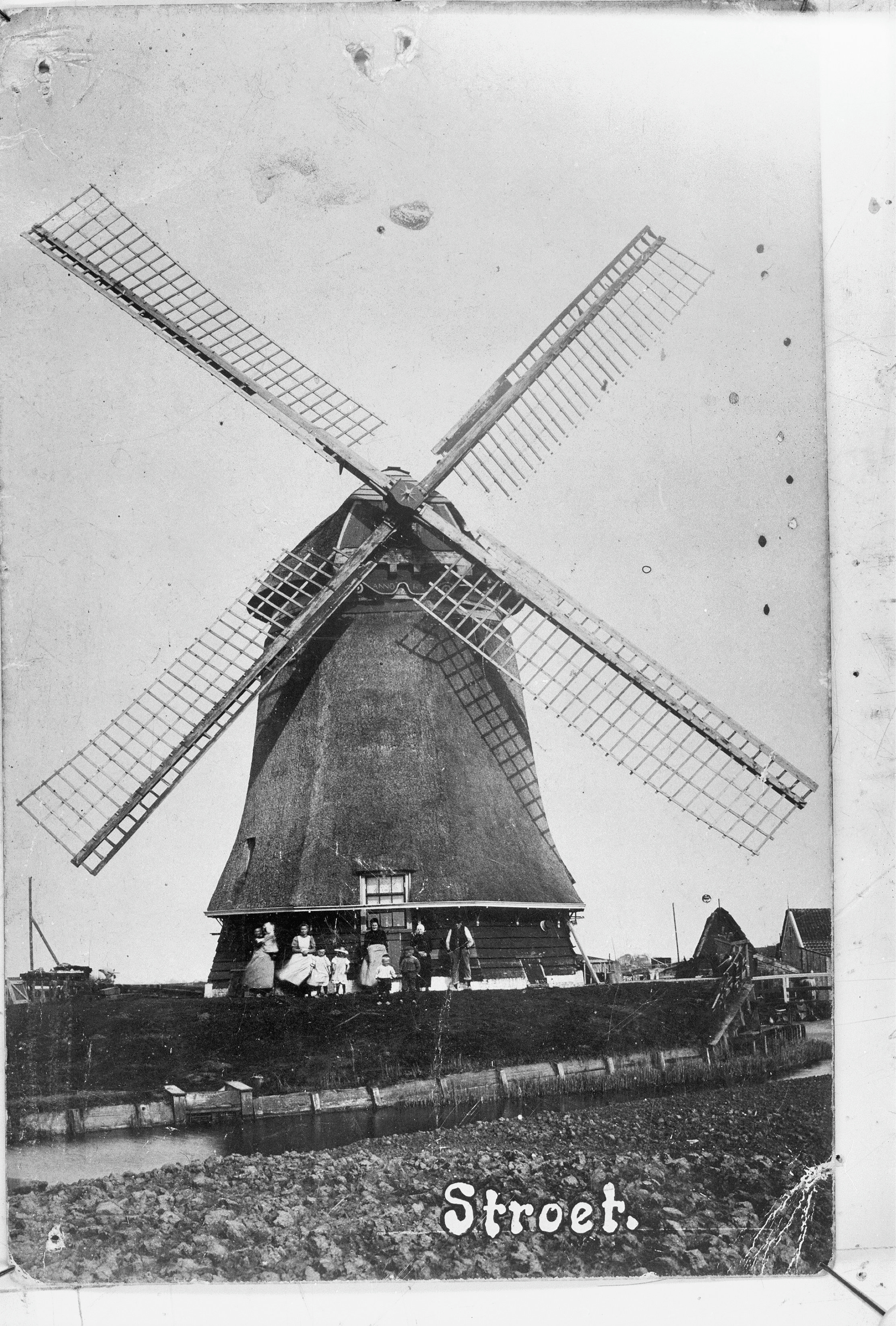
- Former windmill

- Location in the Netherlands Location in the province of North Holland in the Netherlands
- Coordinates: 52°45′N 4°45′E
- Country: Netherlands
- Province: North Holland
- Municipality: Schagen

Area
  - Total: 0.26 km^{2} (0.10 sq mi)
- Elevation: −0.7 m (−2.3 ft)

Population (2025)
  - Total: 305
  - Density: 1,200/km^{2} (3,000/sq mi)
- Time zone: UTC+1 (CET)
  - Summer (DST): UTC+2 (CEST)
- Postal code: 1744
- Dialing code: 0224

Stroet is a village in the Dutch province of North Holland. It is a part of the municipality of Schagen, and lies about 11 km north of Heerhugowaard.

The village was first mentioned in 1343 as Stroeden, and means "soggy area with shrubbery". Stroet used to have a wind mill, but it was demolished in the early 20th century.
