= Celeste Plak =

Dutch volleyball player

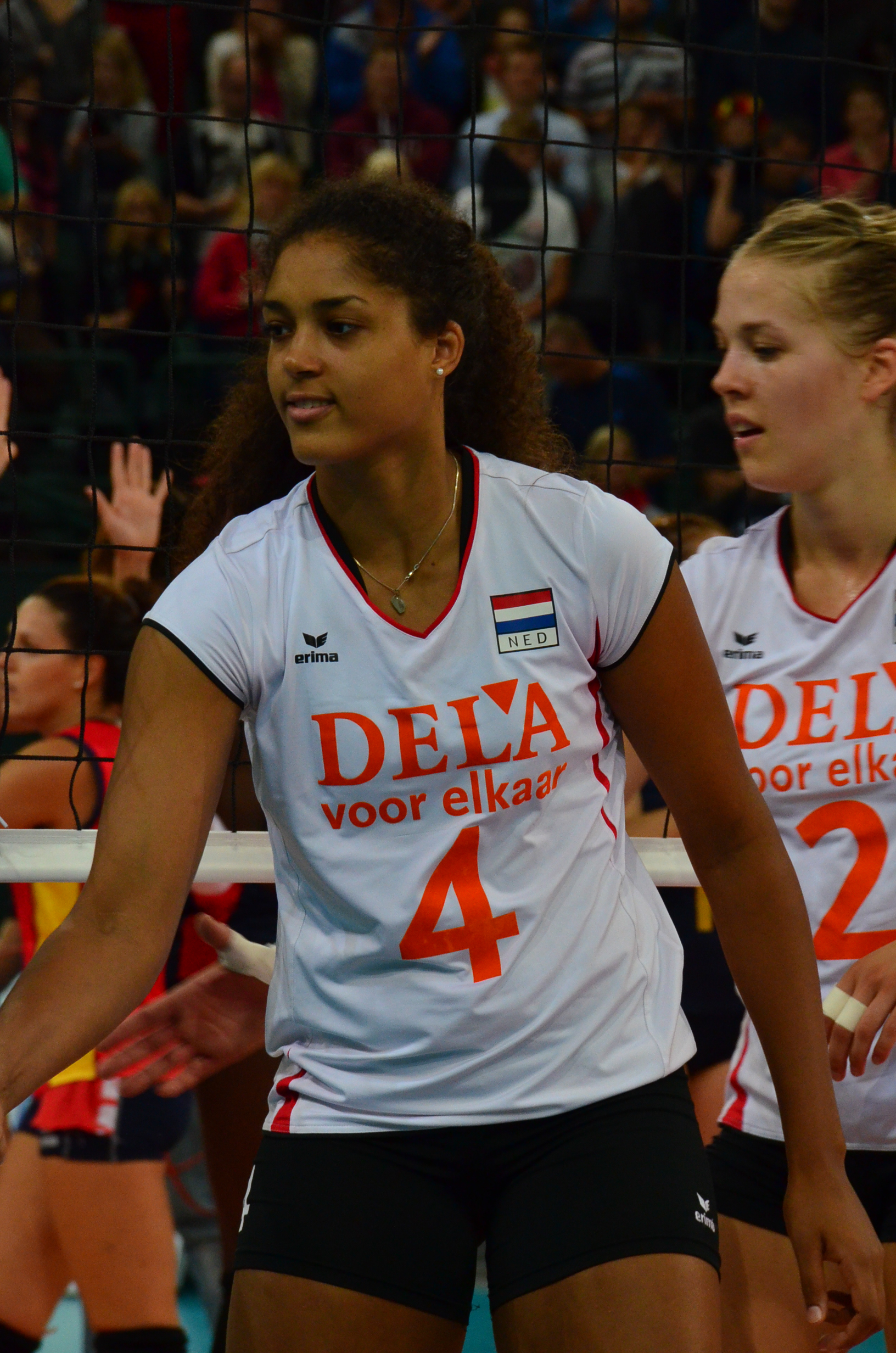

Personal information
- Full name: Celeste Elle Plak
- Nationality: Dutch
- Born: 26 October 1995 (age 31); Tuitjenhorn, Netherlands
- Height: 1.90 m (6 ft 3 in)
- Weight: 84 kg (185 lb)
- Spike: 314 cm (124 in)
- Block: 302 cm (119 in)

Volleyball information
- Position: Wing Spiker / Opposite spiker

Career
Years	Teams
2008–2010; 2010–2012; 2012–2014; 2014–2016; 2016–2019; 2019-2020; 2021-2023; 2023-2024; 2023-2024; 2024-2025; 2025-2026; 2026	VV De Boemel; VV Dinto; VV Alterno; Volley Bergamo; Igor Gorgonzola Novara; Aydın Büyükşehir Belediyespor; Victorina Himeji; Roma Volley Club; Besiktas Ayos; Gerdau Minas; Numia Vero Volley Milano; Jakarta Elektrik PLN

National team
Netherlands
Honours
Women's volleyball
Representing the Netherlands
World Grand Prix
Bronze medal – third place	2016 Bangkok
European Championship
Silver medal – second place	2015 Belgium/Netherlands
Silver medal – second place	2017 Azerbaijan/Georgia
Bronze medal – third place	2023 Belgium/Estonia/Germany/Italy

Celeste Elle Plak (born 26 October 1995) is a Dutch volleyball player, who plays as an outside hitter. She plays for Victorina Himeji, and is the first non-caucasian player to be a part of the Netherlands women's national volleyball team.

== Career ==
Plak was first taken by her mother to the volleyball school she worked in at the age of 6. When she was 10, she was invited to join the Nederlandse Volleybal School, and after two months there, Plak left the selection because she thought she was not good enough. After retreating to local club De Boemel, a few months later her former coach visited her matches during the national Dutch youth championships in Sneek. He was impressed and convinced her to come back as she had a good chance to make it to the national elite team. Plak eventually was accepted into the Dutch youth national team, the Jeugd Oranje (Orange Youth) in 2009, at the age of 13. Her coach said Plak would become the first black player in the Dutch national team, which she achieved in 2013, debuting at the FIVB World Grand Prix.

As an intern for the Orange Youth, Plak lived at the national sports centre in Papendal, only returning home during weekends. After playing a year with the first division (eerste divisie) club Dinto in Warmenhuizen, the Dutch federation advised her to start playing for a team in the highest division (eredivisie). She could choose between Weert and Alterno Apeldoorn. Because she wanted to stay at Papendal, where she attended Johan Cruyff College in Nijmegen, she chose Alterno. She was sixteen years old than. Plak still had to travel a lot, especially in the weekends when Alterno played matches on both Saturdays and Sundays. During these weekends she could stay at the home of the assistant coach a former international player, together with her husband and three children. Later she got her own room in the house and sometimes she stayed there six days a week.

After many years ignoring offers by foreign teams, during a 2014 FIVB Volleyball Women's World Championship qualification match in Croatia, Plak was seen by manager Donato Saltini. He helped her to an international club: Volley Bergamo in Italy, for which she started playing in the 2014–15 season. She moved to Bergamo where she had an appartement near the city.

Plak was the Netherlands' top scorer at the 2014 FIVB Volleyball Women's World Championship.

== Personal life ==
Plak was born in Tuitjenhorn, daughter of Surinamese kickboxing world champion Kenneth and Dutch volleyball player Karin. She has a younger brother, Fabian, who also plays volleyball. Plak went to the Johan Cruyff College in Nijmegen.

== Awards ==
=== Clubs ===
==== National championships ====
- 2013/2014 Dutch Championship, with Alterno
- 2016/2017 Italian Championship, with Igor Gorgonzola Novara
