= Daniella van Graas =

Dutch model and actress (born 1975)

- Born: 1975 (age 50–51); Tuitjenhorn, Netherlands
- Occupations: actress, model
- Years active: 1997–2013
- Height: 1.80 m (5 ft 11 in)
- Spouse: Brett Tawil
- Children: 3

Daniella van Graas (born 1975) is a Dutch fashion model, cover girl, and actress. She has appeared in movies, on television, and between 1997 and 2003, on the cover of several magazines. In 2012, she was featured in the Dutch television show The Prettiest Girl in Class.

== Early life and education ==
Van Graas grew up in Tuitjenhorn, where she attended the Sint Barbaraschool, a Roman Catholic elementary school. Her father was a teacher, her mother a homemaker. After elementary school, she attended the college prep track at the Christian High School Jan Arentsz in Alkmaar, cycling 15 kilometers (9.3 miles) each way daily to and from home.

== Entertainment career ==
=== Modelling ===
At age 18, van Graas was scouted by a modelling agent at a shopping mall in Amsterdam. She moved to Paris, where she worked with Ford Modeling Agency, and then to New York.

As a model, van Graas collaborated with Armani Jeans, Aveeno, Barely There, CoverGirl, L'Oréal, Max Factor, Maybelline, Pantene, Pepsi, and H&M. She also worked with Marie Claire Netherlands. She appeared in a fashion show at the 68th Academy Awards ceremony.

Van Graas was the spokesmodel and "face" for Aveeno, "a brand that sells natural-based skin- and hair-care products"; that relationship lasted for years, ending in 2013, when Jennifer Aniston took over the role.

Van Graas appeared on the covers of the magazines Femina (2001), Fitness (March, 2003, August and December 2004, July 2010), New Woman (March and September 1998), Cosmopolitan (U.S. and U.K., April 1999), Self and Marie Claire Netherlands (December 1997). She is featured in the 2014, book Schoonheid is jezelf zijn [Beauty is being yourself], an anthology of diverse views on the nature of beauty.

=== Acting ===
Van Graas recognizes that her film acting has been largely typecast as a model in one form or another. She notes that being on set with professionals has helped her grow as an actress. She states she aspires toward a wider set of roles. "If she had the choice, she knows what she wants to play. 'Something like Charlize Theron in Monster. Arriving nicely [with a] twenty kilos [3 st 2 lb gain] and walking without care. That seems wonderful to me. But that is not really realistic.'"

In October 2008, van Graas appeared in the TV show Entourage. She played episodic roles and supporting roles in the films Perfect Stranger, Love by the Rules and Without, Autumn in New York.

On January 19, 2012, the TROS dedicated its third episode of the season of The Prettiest Girl in Class to van Graas. According to the TV program, she grew up in the village of Tuitjenhorn, "amidst cabbage fields and where the fair is seen as the highlight of the year" and she was deemed a "stand out".

== Filmography ==
=== Movies ===
Year	Film	Role	Notes
2000	Autumn in New York	Model at bar	Feature film
2002	New Americans	Olga	TV movie
2002	Maid in Manhattan	Fiancée	Feature film
2003	Something's Gotta Give	Beauty	Feature film
2004	Marmalade	Herself	Feature film
2007	Perfect Stranger	Josie	Feature film
2012	Girl Most Likely	Cecille	Feature film
2013	The Word	Heather	Feature film

=== Television ===
Year	TV Series	Role	Notes
2002	All My Children	Fiona Sinclair	Soap Opera
2008	Entourage	Natasha Ladianova	HBO Series
2012	Het mooiste meisje van de klas	Herself	Dutch TV show

== Personal life ==
Van Graas is 5 ft 11 in (180 cm) tall. She is married to Brett Tawil, a sports coach. The couple live in New York and have three children.
