= Tuitjenhorn =

- Village
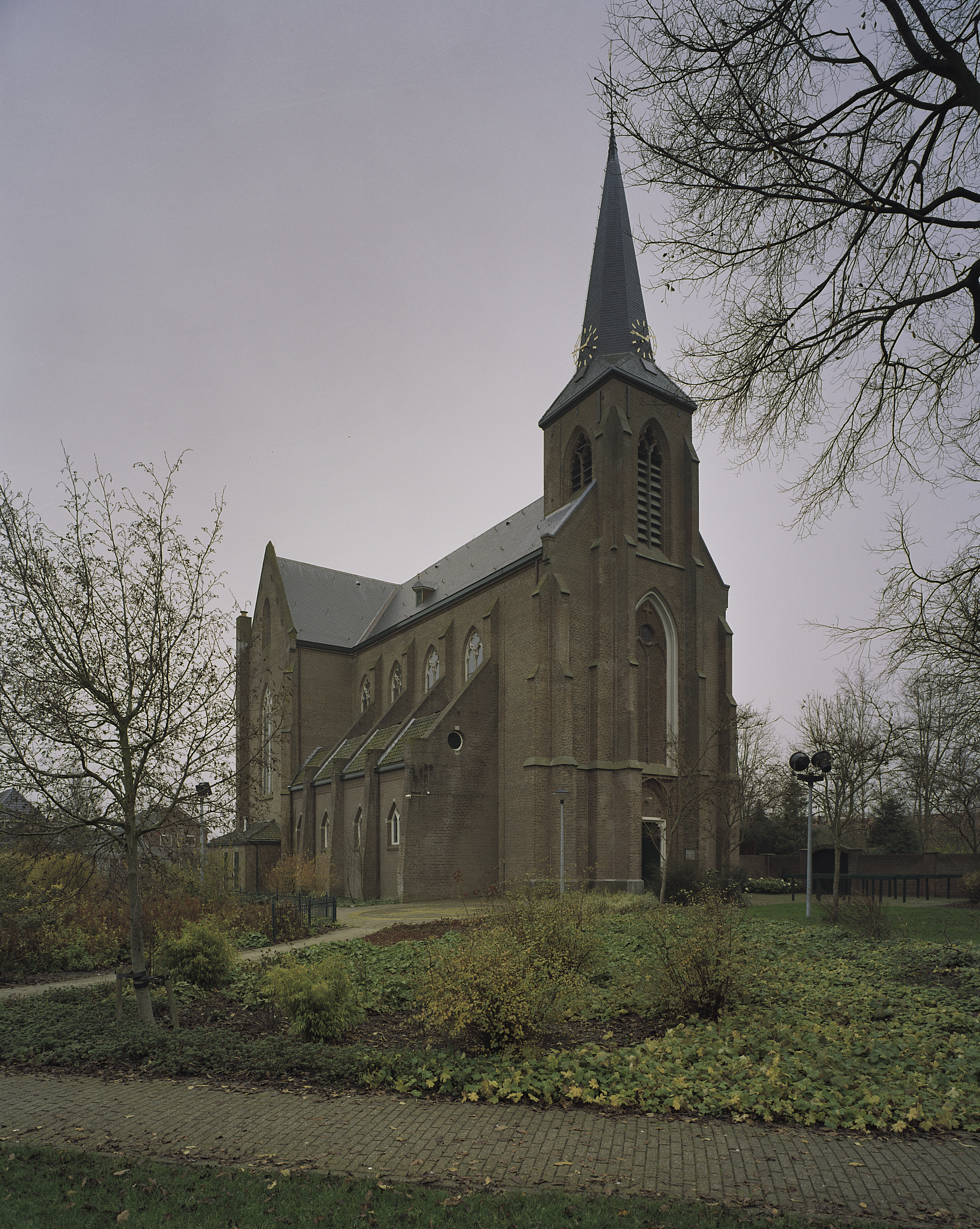
- Church of Saint James

- Location in the Netherlands Location in the province of North Holland in the Netherlands
- Coordinates: 52°44′N 4°45′E
- Country: Netherlands
- Province: North Holland
- Municipality: Schagen

Area
  - Village: 3.20 km^{2} (1.24 sq mi)
- Elevation: −0.8 m (−2.6 ft)

Population (2025)
  - Village: 3,520
  - Density: 1,100/km^{2} (2,850/sq mi)
  - Urban: 3,480
  - Rural: 40
- Time zone: UTC+1 (CET)
  - Summer (DST): UTC+2 (CEST)
- Postal code: 1747
- Dialing code: 0226

Tuitjenhorn (West Frisian: Tutinghorn) is a village in the Dutch province of North Holland. It is a part of the municipality of Schagen. Tuitjenhorn was the main village of the former Harenkarspel municipality. Tuitjenhorn lies about 9 km northwest of Heerhugowaard.

The village was first mentioned between 1280 and 1287 as "van tutinghehorne". The etymology is unclear. Tuitjenhorn is a dike village. The Catholic St Jacobus de Meerdere Church is a basilica-like church built between 1857 and 1859 and has been built around a tower from 1810.

== Famous Tuitjenhorners ==
- Gerard Kuiper, Dutch-American astronomer
- Daniella van Graas, Dutch fashion model and actress
- Celeste Plak, Dutch volleyball player
- Femke Meines, Dutch singer

== Gallery ==
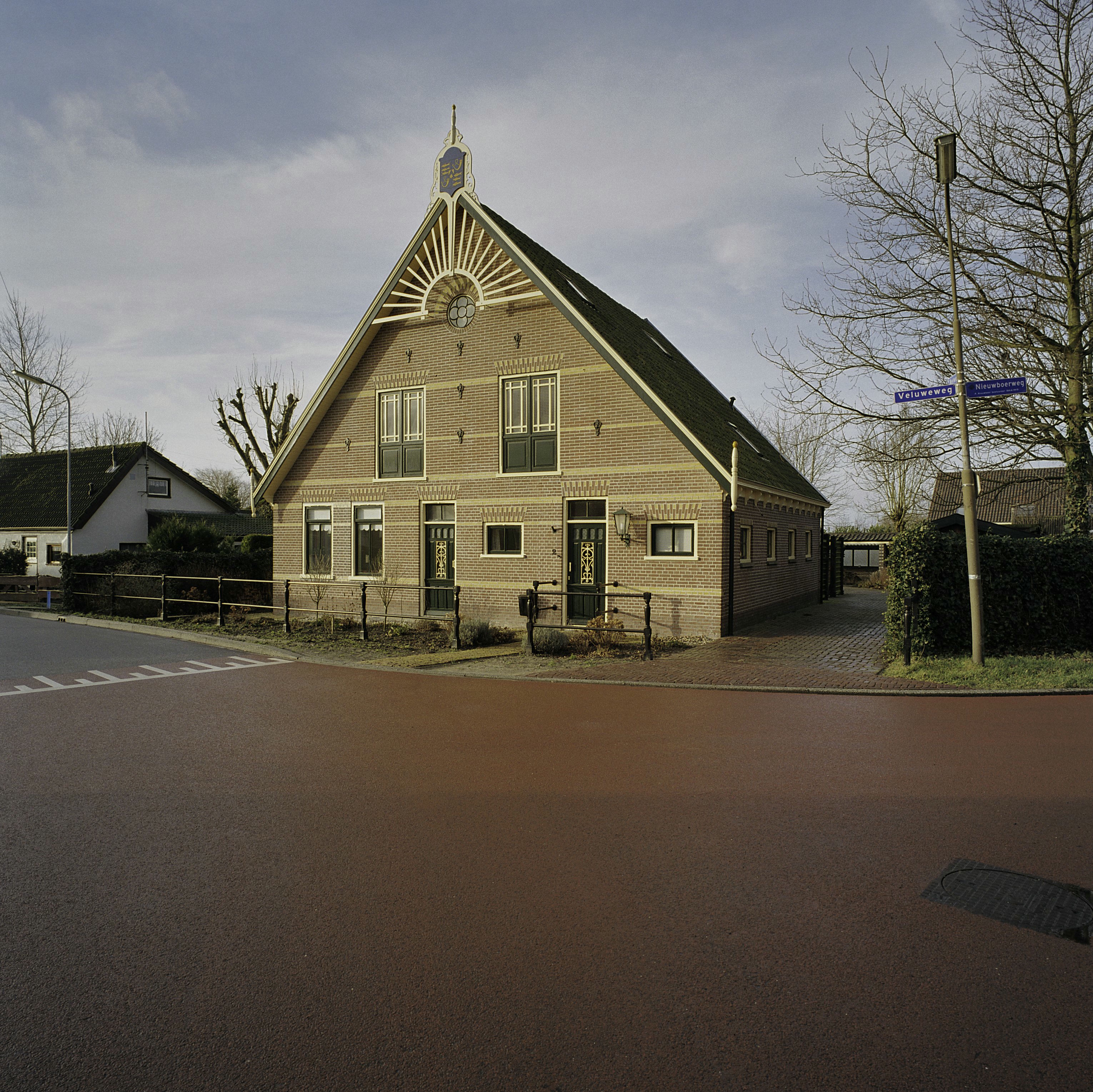
Farm in Tuitjenhorn

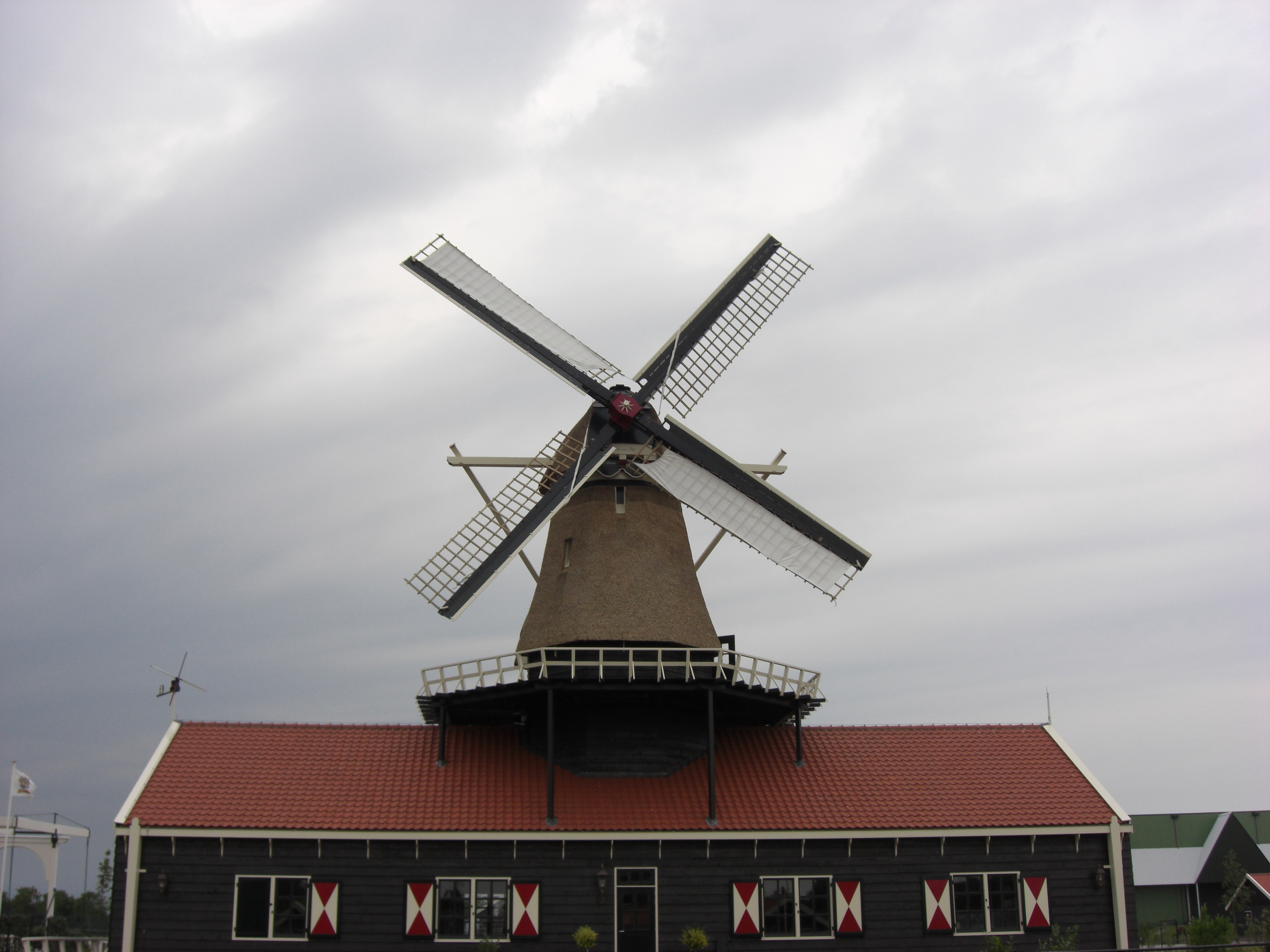
Windmill of Piet (folly which serves as landmark in the local "Van Blanckendaell Park" zoo)
