= West Frisian Dutch =

Hollandic Dutch dialect

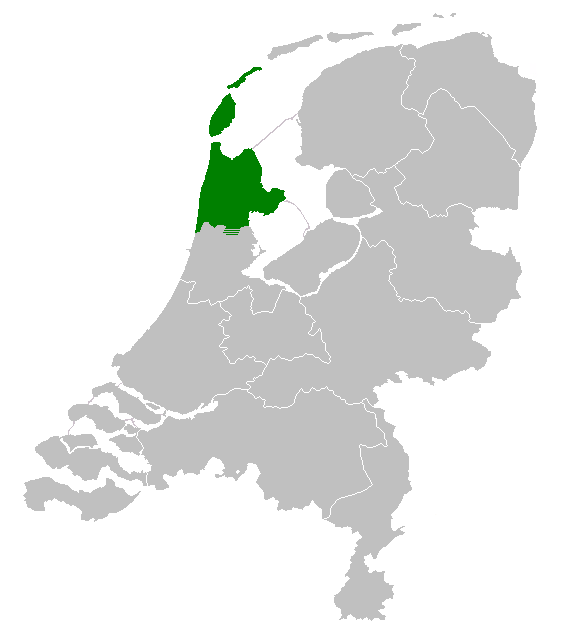
West-Frisian dialect in the Netherlands

The West Frisian dialect (Dutch: West-Fries) is a Dutch dialect spoken in the contemporary West Friesland region, Wieringen, Wieringermeer, and Friesland Province. The coastal area from Den Helder to Castricum, and the island of Texel. It is a Hollandic Dutch dialect but is influenced by West Frisian (Dutch: Westerlauwers Fries, a language of Friesland Province distinct from Dutch), which is related.

The dialect in itself is not a fixed one, as there is a diverse number of subdialects (sometimes referred to as the West Frisian dialect group) that consists of some widely spoken regional dialects, namely Wierings in Wieringen, Tessels or Texels in Texel and the dialect of Vlieland known as Vlielands, which has fallen into disuse. The smaller regions and villages, such as Zijpe, Andijk, Enkhuizen and Schagen, have some distinct differences between them. Slightly more different from the rest of the group is Derpers, the dialect of the village Egmond aan Zee.

The dialect descends from an older form of the Hollandic dialect. Only about 7-9% of the people speak the strong dialect or a mixture of strong and light. The light dialect is much more widely spoken but is also slowly beginning to become lighter and sound more like Dutch.

Since the 1970s, there has been more interest in reading and writing the dialect. Little had been written before then, as it was mostly a spoken language by common people.

The West Frisian dialect and Dutch have some common characteristics, including gender system, but most of the Frisian nouns have different gender features in contrast to those of the Dutch words.

== See also ==
- Low Franconian languages
- Languages of the Netherlands
