= Schagen =

- City and municipality
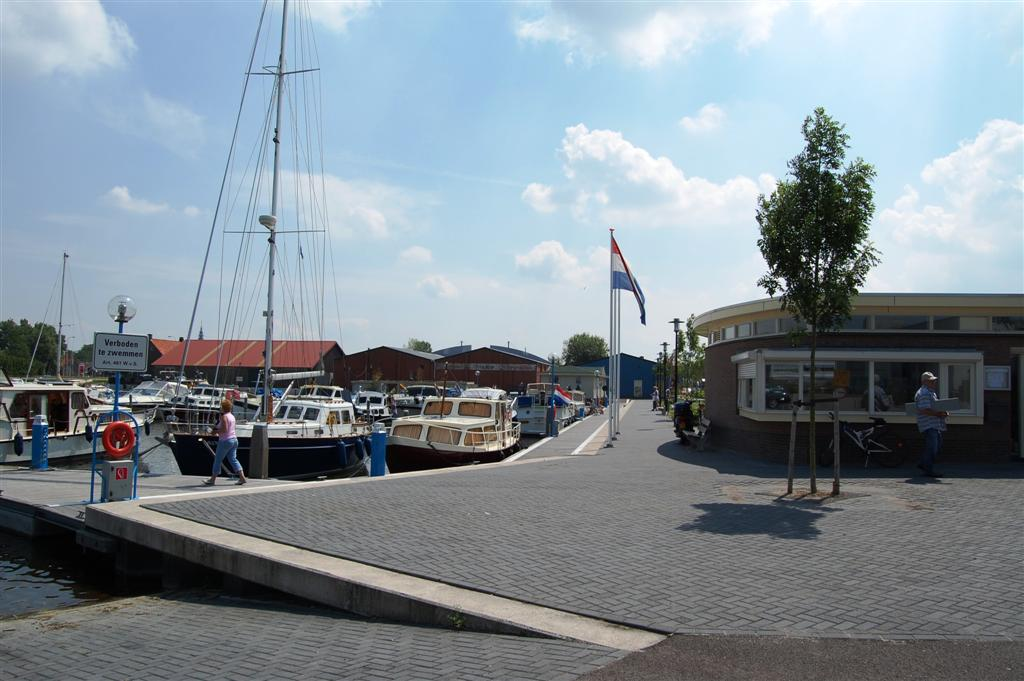
- Marina in Schagen

- Flag Coat of arms

- Location in North Holland
- Coordinates: 52°47′N 4°48′E
- Country: Netherlands
- Province: North Holland

Government
  - Body: Municipal council
  - Mayor: Marjan van Kampen - Nouwen (CDA)

Area
  - Total: 187.28 km^{2} (72.31 sq mi)
  - Land: 168.25 km^{2} (64.96 sq mi)
  - Water: 19.03 km^{2} (7.35 sq mi)
- Elevation: 0 m (0 ft)

Population (January 2021)
  - Total: 46,532
  - Density: 277/km^{2} (720/sq mi)
- Demonym(s): Schagenaar, Schager
- Time zone: UTC+1 (CET)
  - Summer (DST): UTC+2 (CEST)
- Postcode: 1738–1759
- Area code: 0224, 0226
- Website: www.schagen.nl

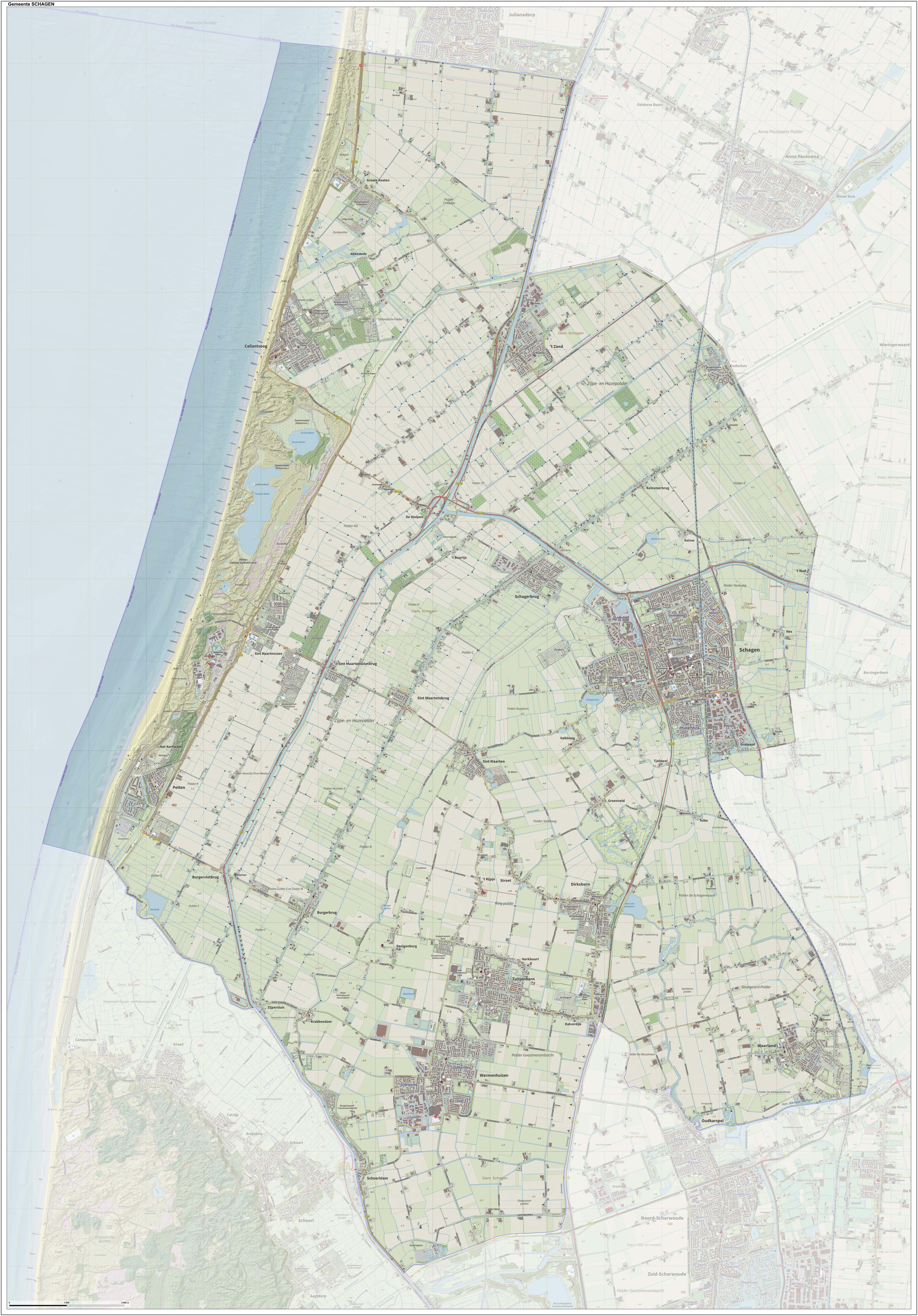
Map of Schagen, June 2015

Schagen (Dutch pronunciation: [ˈsxaːɣə(n)]) is a city and municipality in the northwestern Netherlands. It is located between Alkmaar and Den Helder, in the region of West Friesland and the province of North Holland. It received city rights in 1415. In 2013, Schagen merged with the neighbouring municipalities of Zijpe and Harenkarspel, forming a new municipality, also called Schagen. The town hall is located in the main town of Schagen.

It had a population of 46,532 in 2021 and covers an area of 187.28 km^{2} (72.31 sq mi).

== History ==
=== 10th–15th centuries ===
Schagen has been mentioned in various texts from around 975. One was a population count that found that 43 people lived there. Schagen was also mentioned in documents as Scagha from around 989. At this time Schagen was a center of artificial dwelling hills. The name may refer to Scagha to its location above land water: it could mean "elevated point". Some time later, there was a coastline near Schagen. When the sea retreated again at the end of the 13th century the places in the region grew. The land around Schagen was especially fertile, so it grew and remained the main town in the area.

In 1415, William VI granted city rights to the town. In 1427, Philip the Good of Burgundy loaned Schagen to his uncle William of Bronckhorst, one of the seven illegitimate children of Albrecht of Bavaria, and Maria van Bronckhorst. Schagen became a fief with some regional rights in addition to its city rights, including some control over the small towns around Schagen. William ordered the castle in which he lived from 1440. In 1460, the church of Schagen, dedicated to St. Christopher, was consecrated. In 1463 Schagen received the right to hold a cattle market and it became a trading town for a wider region.

=== 16th–19th centuries ===
From 1603, an annual horse market was held in Schagen, upon authorization by the States of Holland and Westfriesland.

At the beginning of the Golden Age Schagen underwent very little growth, unlike other cities in the region: Alkmaar, Enkhuizen, Medemblik, and Hoorn. Later in the Golden Age the city benefited from the increased prosperity, but never to the degree these other cities enjoyed. Even after the Golden Age growth was limited. Partly due to the reclamation of the surrounding area, Schagen could flourish economically again in the 19th century. In particular, the cattle market played an important role. When in 1865 the railroad between Alkmaar and Den Helder came into use, the market and home industries flourished. Schagen had about 2060 inhabitants at this time.

In 1894, Schagen was shocked by a double murder, when 17-year-old Klaas Boes murdered his 55-year-old neighbor and her 17-year-old niece. The murder attracted wide national media attention and caused the murderer's mother to commit suicide. Newly appointed mayor Simon Berman headed a committee that offered 750 guilders reward, donated by the residents, for information. In 1895, Boes was sentenced to life imprisonment, later changed to 25 years. He was released from prison in 1922 and died in 1956. For years, "Klaas Boes" was used in the Netherlands for youngsters who were up to no good.

=== 20th–21st centuries ===
During the 20th century, prosperity slowly decreased. Especially after the Second World War there was a sharp decline in the agricultural sector. As Schagen did not only depend on agriculture, the decline was less than in surrounding rural communities. Around 1960 Schagen started to flourish again, though population was still below 5,000. The seventies saw a large boom for Schagen. In the early nineties, growth gradually diminished but Schagen remained relatively strong compared to neighboring municipalities.

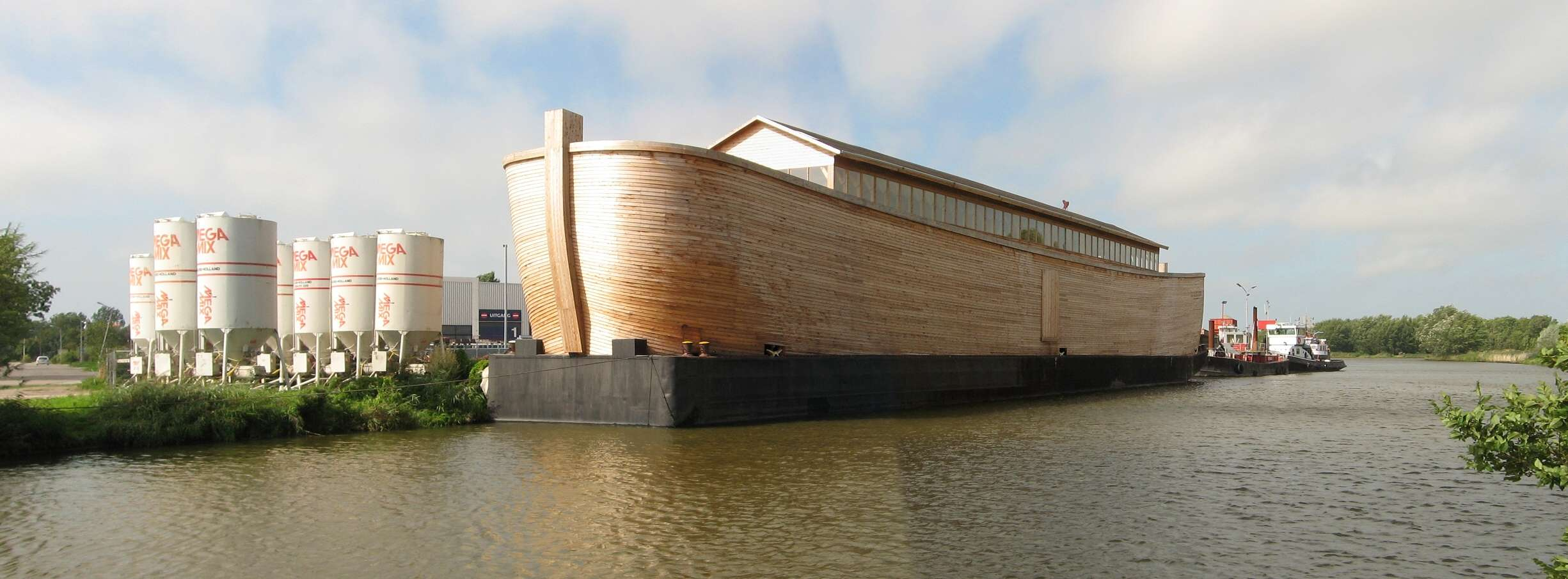
The Ark van Johan interpretation of Noah's Ark in the town of Schagen.

From 2005 to 2007, Schagen resident Johan Huibers built a ship modeled after the biblical description of Noah's Ark in Schagen. Johan's Ark was opened to the public in April 2007 and later towed between various port cities in the Netherlands.

== Transportation ==
Intercity trains stop at Schagen railway station, providing good connectivity with Den Helder to the North and Alkmaar and Amsterdam to the South. All south-bound trains pass through Amsterdam Centraal, and then continue through Utrecht Centraal either to Eindhoven and Maastricht or to Arnhem and Nijmegen. The journey time to Amsterdam is 51 minutes (Sloterdijk) or 57 minutes (Centraal.)

The railway station is Schagen's hub for local and regional bus services.

As of 2017, three of the five operational vlotbruggen ("float bridges") are in Schagen: at Burgervlotbrug, at Sint Maartensvlotbrug, and at 't Zand.

== Politics ==
The municipal council of Schagen consists of 29 seats, which are divided as follows:

Municipal council seats
Party	2012	2018	2022	2026
JESS Lokaal (until 2020: JESS, until 2015: Jong En Sterker Schagen)	3	3	6	6
Christian Democratic Appeal (CDA)	9	10	7	6
People's Party for Freedom & Democracy (VVD)	5	4	4	4
GreenLeft (GL) / Labour Party (PvdA)	–	–	–	4
Labour Party (PvdA)	5	3	3	*
GreenLeft (GL)	–	1	1	*
Forum for Democracy	–	–	–	3
Seniorenpartij Schagen (VSPS)	3	4	5	3
Democrats 66 (D66)	1	1	1	2
Wens4U	1	1	1	1
Socialist Party (SP)	1	1	1	–
Duurzaam Schagen (until 2017: Duurzaam Natuurlijk Alternatief)	1	1	–	–
Total	29	29	29	29

Due to the interim local elections in November 2012 for the new merged municipal council, Schagen did not take part in the Dutch-wide municipal elections of 2014.
* The GreenLeft and the Labour Party had a joint list in 2026.

== Notable people ==
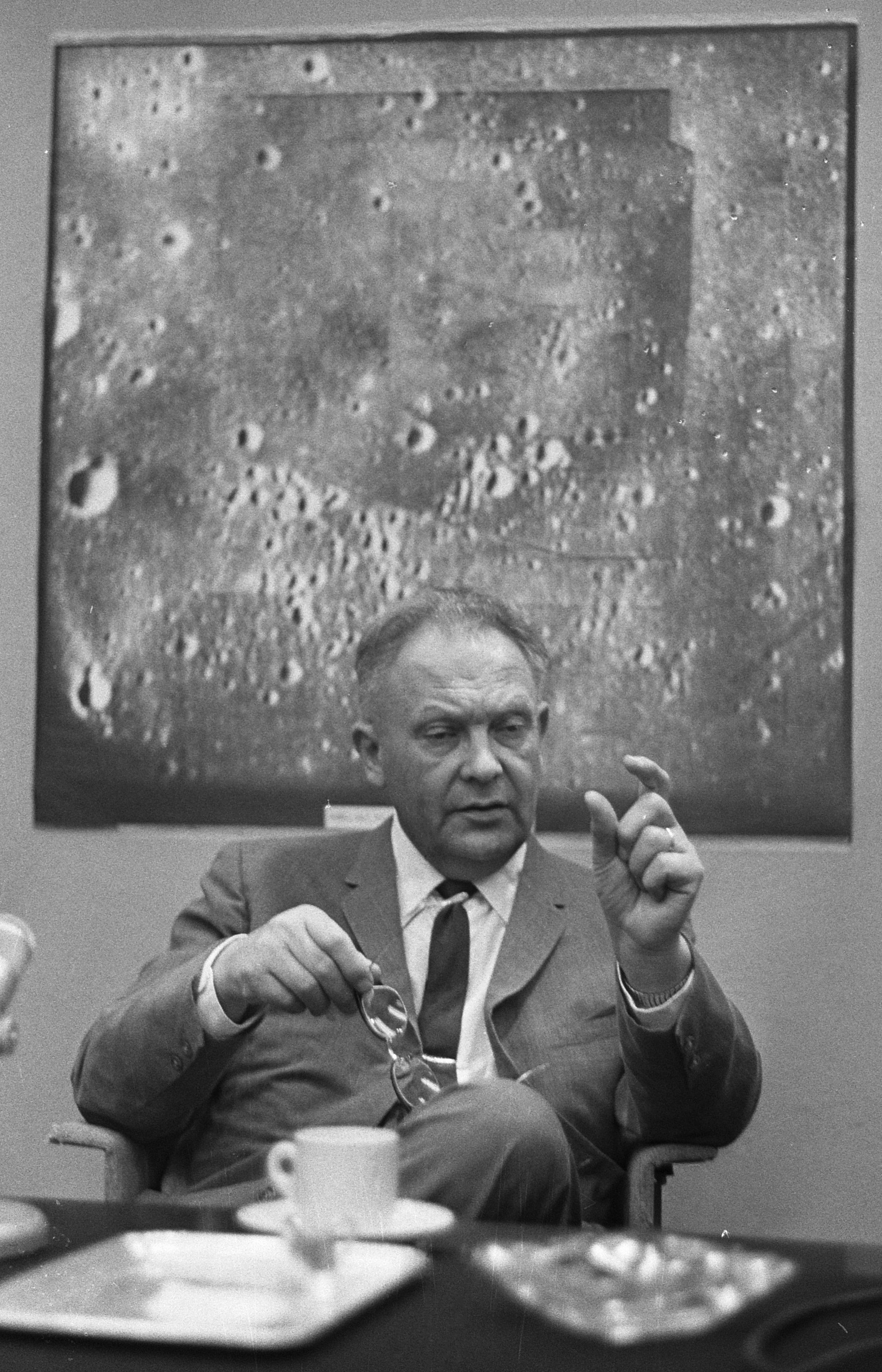
Gerard Kuiper, 1964

- Adriaen van Cronenburg (1525 in Schagen – after 1604) a painter, mainly of portraits
- Jan van Noordt (1623/24 in Schagen – after 1676) was a Dutch Golden Age painter
- Simon Berman (1861 in Landsmeer – 1934) the Mayor of Schagen, 1894–1900
- Gerard Kuiper (1905 in Tuitjenhorn – 1973) a Dutch–American astronomer; eponymous namesake of the Kuiper belt
- Joop Klant (1915 in Warmenhuizen – 1994) an economist, novelist and academic
- Ben Essing (1935 in Dirkshorn – 1994) an impresario
- Cees Geel (born 1965 in Schagen) a television, radio and film actor
- Bianca Krijgsman (born 1968 in Oudesluis) a comedian and actress
- Daniella van Graas (born 1975 in Tuitjenhorn) a fashion model, cover girl, and actress
- Femke Meines (born 2000 in Tuitjenhorn) a singer and actress

=== Sport ===
- Rein Boomsma (1879 in Schagen – 1943 in Neuengamme concentration camp) a footballer
- Richard Rozendaal (born 1972 in Warmenhuizen) a track cyclist, competed at the 1996 Summer Olympics
- Ruben Houkes (born 1979 in Schagen) a Dutch judoka, bronze medallist at the 2008 Summer Olympics
- Celeste Plak (born 1995 in Tuitjenhorn) a volleyball player
- Pleuni Cornelisse (born 1999 in Schagen) a judoka

== Gallery ==
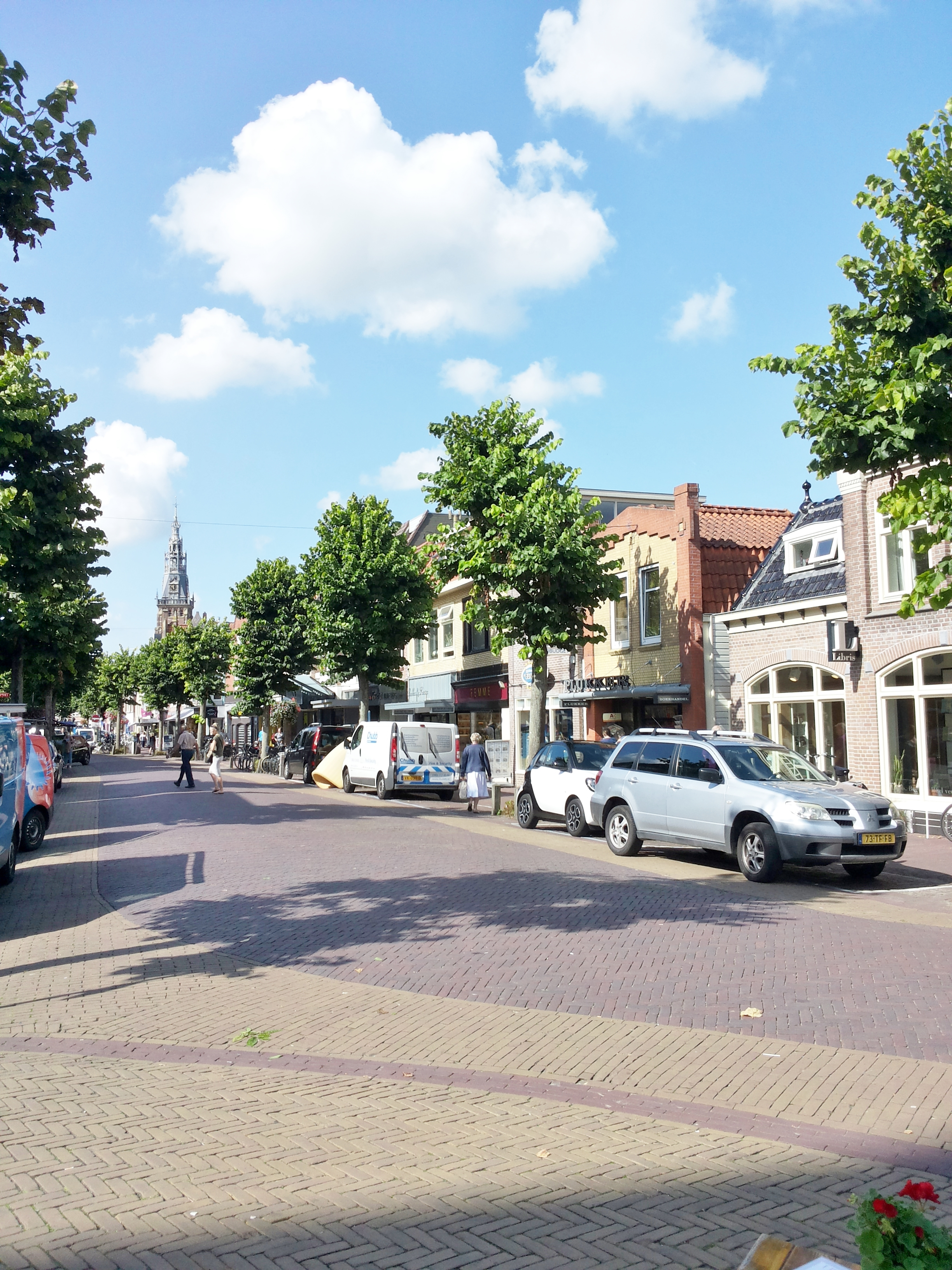
Schagen City

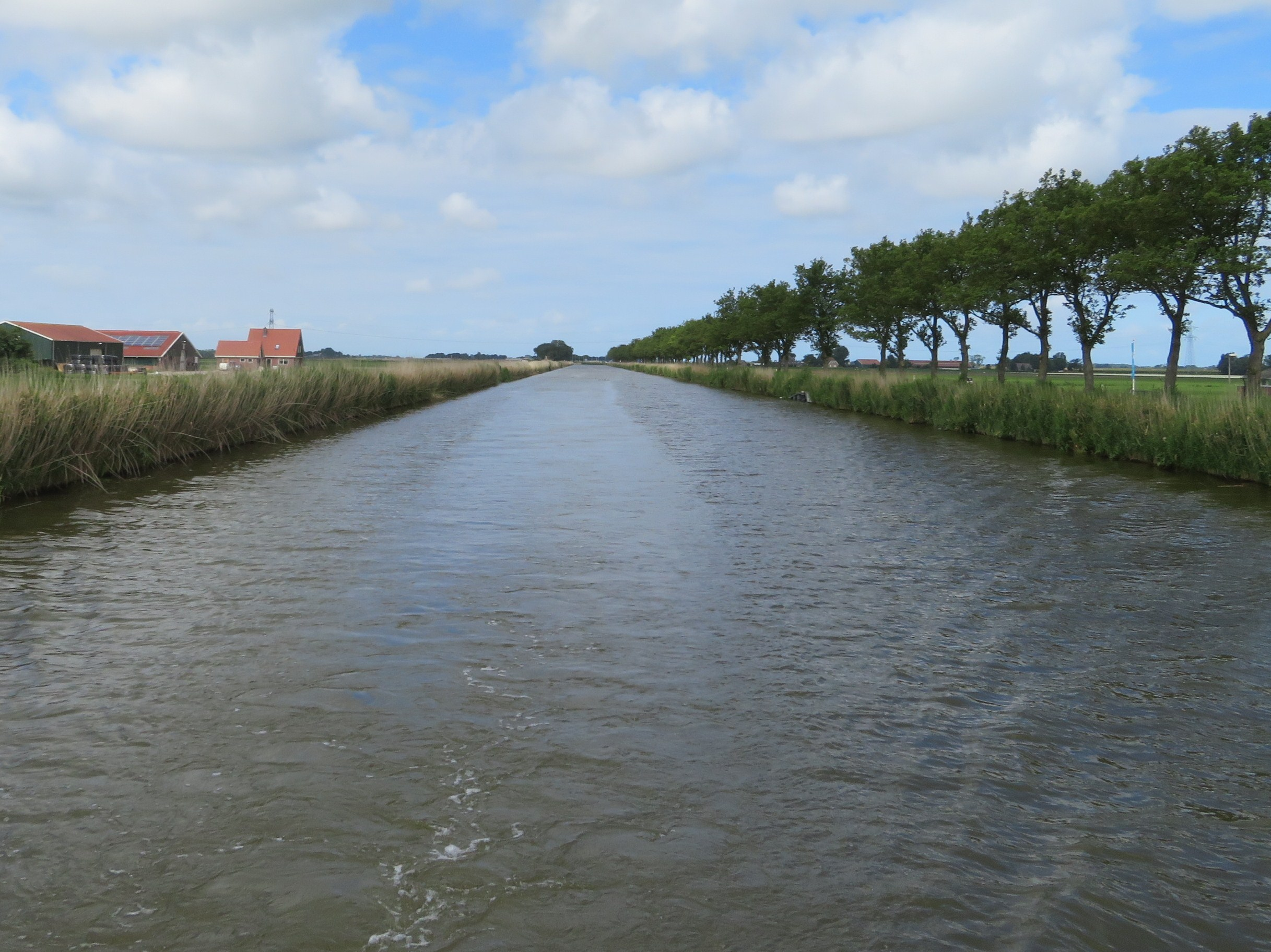
Schagerkogge Canal

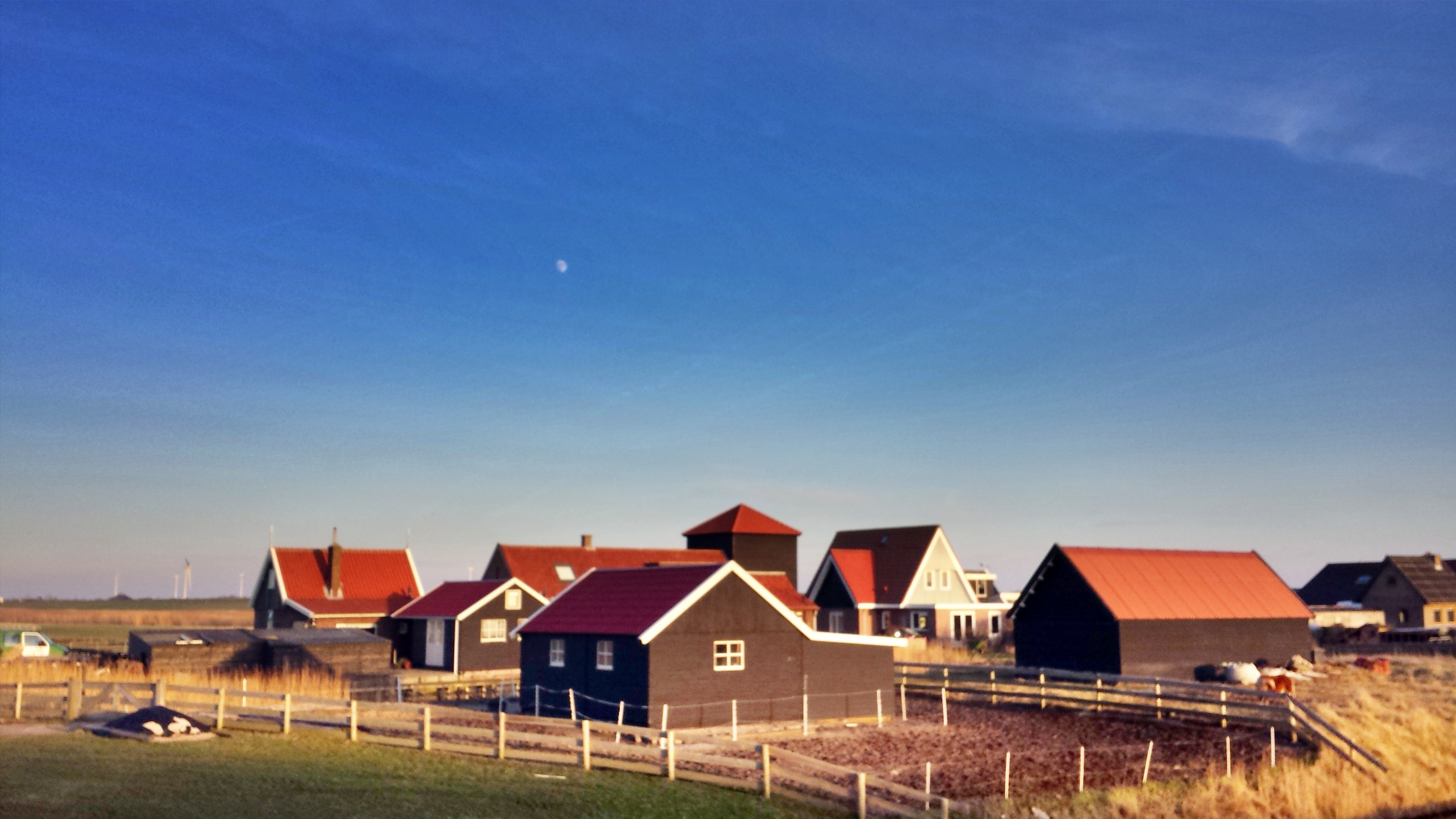
Buildings, Leihoek

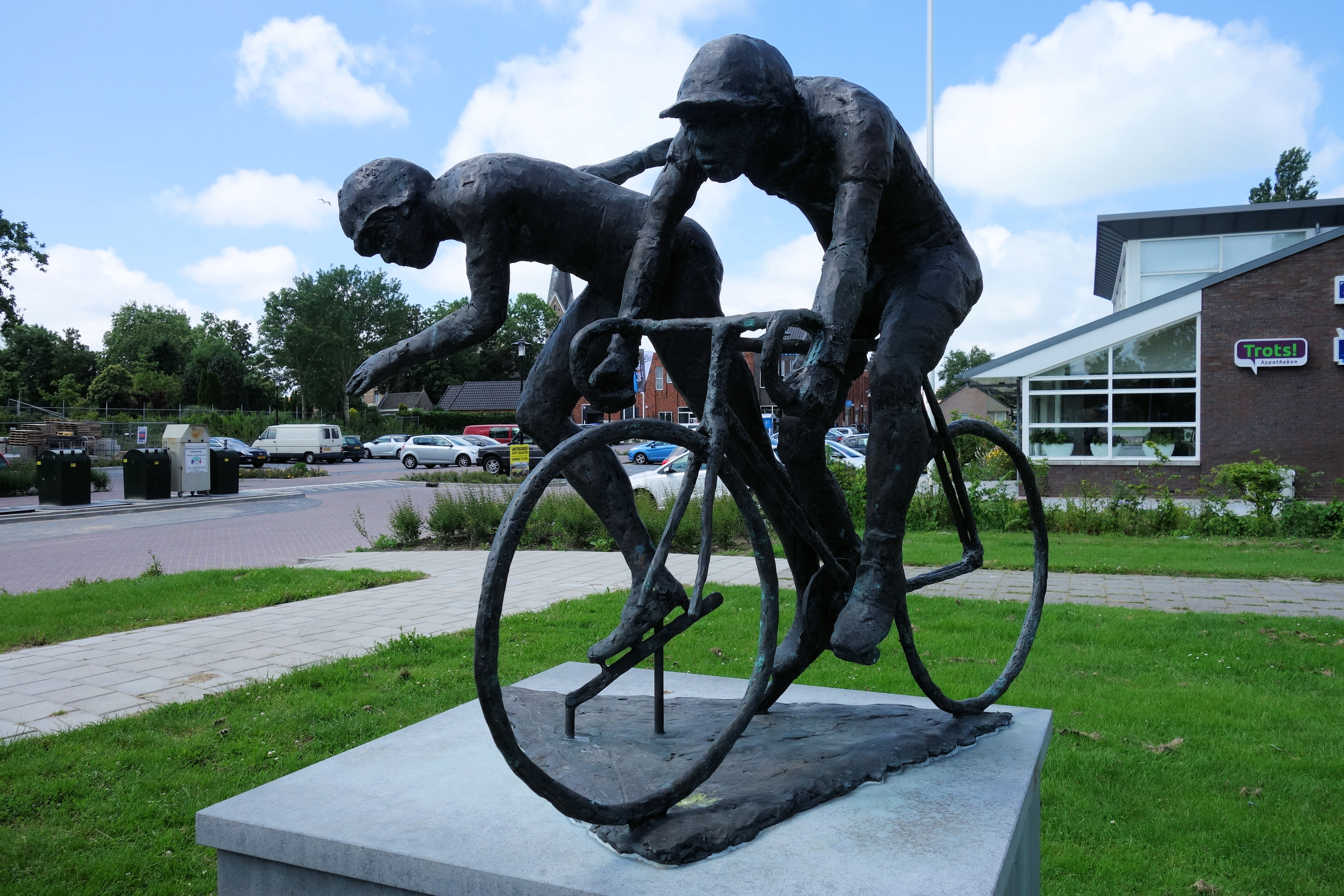
De Sporters, Warmenhuizen
