= Battle of Krabbendam =

Battle of the Anglo-Russian invasion of Holland

- Part of the Anglo-Russian invasion of Holland
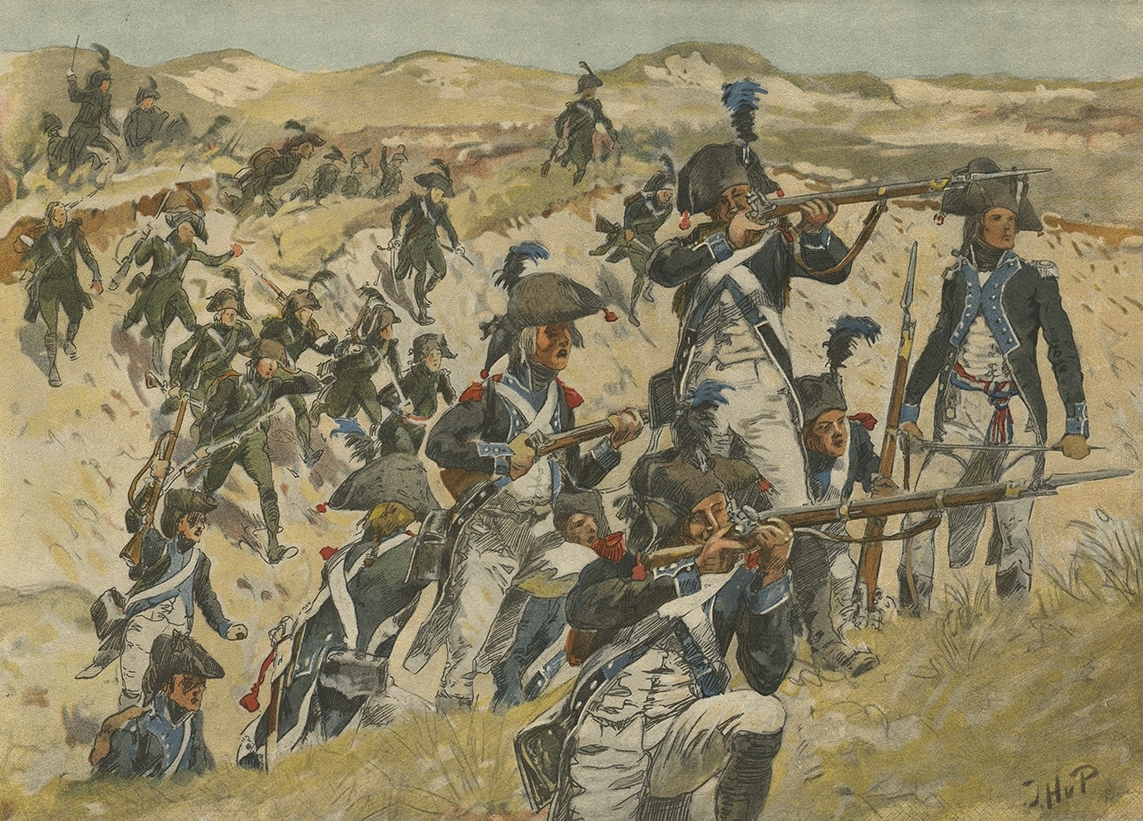
- Illustration of Batavian troops during the invasion
Date	10 September 1799
Location	Krabbendam, Batavian Republic 52.8167°N 4.7700°E
Result	British victory

Belligerents
France; Batavian Republic	Great Britain

Commanders and leaders
(France) Guillaume Marie Anne Brune (Batavian Republic) Herman Willem Daendels	(Kingdom of Great Britain) Ralph Abercromby (Kingdom of Great Britain) Home Riggs Popham

Strength
25,000	23,000; 4 gunboats

Casualties and losses
1,876 dead and wounded	37 dead 147 wounded

The Battle of Krabbendam (also called the Battle of Zijpedijk or the Battle of Zyp) of 10 September 1799 was fought at the seaboard village of Krabbendam during the Anglo-Russian invasion of Holland (1799) between forces of the French Republic and her ally, the Batavian Republic, under the command of French general Guillaume Marie Anne Brune on one side, and a British division under general Sir Ralph Abercromby on the other. The British division had established a bridgehead in the extreme north of the North-Holland peninsula after the Battle of Callantsoog.

Brune tried to dislodge Abercromby's division before it could be reinforced by other Anglo-Russian forces, using Herman Willem Daendels' Batavian divisions to attack frontally while Dominique Vandamme's French division attempted to outflank the British. Poor organization of disposition for the troops by Brune's staff prevented the Batavians from achieving success, and the French division was forced to withdraw due to fire from gunboats under captain Sir Home Popham. Historian Dmitry Milyutin does not specify Popham's actions. He attributes the Franco-Batavian failure to their reliance on infantry alone, while crediting the British success to the effectiveness of both their infantry and artillery (without clarifying if these were army or naval artillery; both types participated in the battle). Furthermore, he states that Krabbendam proved to Brune that "the British could not be dislodged from a strong defensive position, regardless of troop strength". The British victory enabled them and their Russian allies to land their expeditionary force and to break out of the bridgehead during the Battle of Bergen.

== Background ==
After the Battle of Callantsoog General Herman Willem Daendels with the 1st Batavian Division had fallen back all the way to the Schermer polder, as he deemed the Zijpe polder indefensible, because the British could easily perform another amphibious landing at the North-Sea dike near the village of Petten behind him. This left the Zijpe polder (a former marsh that had been transformed into rich farmland by embanking during the 16th century) open to the British. The Zijpe polder formed a natural redoubt, because of its high southern dike (Note: Which was actually the old sea dike from the days before the embanking. It was called the Westfriesche Zeedijk. The name "battle of Zijperdijk" is therefore a slight misnomer.) which had (as usual with Dutch polders) a deep circular drainage canal running along it, which acted as a kind of moat. The dike was high enough to afford a view a long way across all avenues of approach. In addition, it was not straight, but at intervals had circular and angular projections, somewhat like a trace italienne of old, which gave the defenders an opportunity to lay enfilade fire, if necessary. Abercromby took advantage from these natural properties of the terrain, by erecting artillery positions and earthworks at strategic points.

His dispositions were anchored on the right on the subsidiary dike which runs parallel with the sea dike at Petten. Then they ran east along the dike of the Zijpe polder, with reinforcements at the villages of Krabbendam, Eenigenburg, and Sint Maarten, and finally at the Oude Sluys on the coast of (then) the Zuyder Zee (the Wieringermeer polder did not yet exist in those days). The villages in front of this line, like Schagen were occupied as outposts.

Meanwhile, the French and Batavians had frantically been bringing up reinforcements. A French division under General Dominique Vandamme was brought up via Haarlem and occupied a line between Alkmaar and the sea. Brune directed Daendels to come forward to Oudkarspel and Sint Pancras. General Jean-Baptiste Dumonceau brought up two-thirds of his 2nd Batavian division in forced marches from Friesland and he arrived on September 8 to take on a position in the center of the Franco-Batavian front, around Alkmaar. He was then reinforced with the 7th Demi-brigade of Daendels' division.

By September 9 the forces under General Brune had therefore reached a numerical superiority of about 25,000 troops over about 23,000 for General Abercromby (who had by that time only been reinforced with about 500 men of the 11th Light Dragoons). As it was known that soon strong Russian and British reinforcements would be landed, Brune decided to attack on the 10th, while he still had this advantage.

== The battle ==
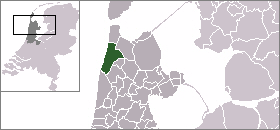
Map of the current Zijpe-polder area

Brune's plan of battle was simple: he would have the Batavian divisions attack the villages of Eenigenburg and Krabbendam, as these commanded two roads that led into the Zijpe polder and hence two of the few points of ingress. The main role would be performed by the French division of Vandamme, who would attempt to turn Abercromby's right flank by advancing along the subsidiary dike near Petten. The plan can therefore be characterised as an attempt at "single envelopment."

Because of the haste to get the attack underway, the preparations were apparently sloppy on the part of Brune's staff. The march routes of the columns of Daendels from St. Pancras and one of the columns of Dumonceau were mistakenly assigned to the same road, because a canal was mistakenly taken for a road due to inexpert map-reading by Brune's staff. This could only have happened because a proper reconnaissance apparently had not been performed. As a consequence, Daendels was forced to take a more easterly route and concentrate on the alternate objective of the village of Sint Maarten, which he duly took. Dumonceau's right-hand column, under General Henri Damas Bonhomme, then attacked Daendels' original objective, the village of Eenigenburg. The attempt to storm the British defenses at this point was, however, frustrated by the circular canal in front of the dike and the well-aimed fire of the defenders. A second attempt likewise failed and Bonhomme remained in his position until both he and Daendels retreated that evening after the retreat of the Franco-Batavian left wing at the same time.

However, Bonhomme's attack should have supported the other column under Colonel Bruce (Note: Like many Batavian officers, Bonhomme and Bruce were descended from French and Scottish officers who had served in the regiments of foreign mercenaries in the former States Army of the Dutch Republic. They were both Dutch-born, despite their "foreign" names.) that had Krabbendam as its objective. Bruce was supposed to advance from Alkmaar, but was delayed appreciably because a large number of farmer's carts going to market blocked the city gate he was trying to use to march his column out. He therefore only arrived at his starting position at 7 AM. Meanwhile, the impatient general Dumonceau had borrowed about 100 grenadiers from Bonhomme's column and had with this small force attacked the British strongpoint of Krabbendam with unexpected success. He even managed to drive the British out once he received reinforcements from Bruce's 6th Demi-brigade that had finally arrived, despite the murderous fire of two British field pieces that were positioned at the entrance of the village. However, these troops suddenly panicked and fled to the rear for reasons that remain unclear.

After rallying and reforming these troops, Dumonceau attempted a new attack and again succeeded in taking Krabbendam. They were attacked by two battalions of the 20th Foot under Lt.Col. Smyth and Major Ross, however, which managed to drive them from the village. Seeing the futility of his efforts, Dumonceau therefore decided to withdraw to Schoorldam at 3 PM.

The French attack on the left wing met with no more success. The French advanced along the sea dike and the parallel subsidiary dike near Petten. At the head of these dikes Abercromby had built a sconce that was defended by two brigades of Foot. Nevertheless, French grenadiers managed to penetrate as far as the dike of the Zijpe polder, but the ring canal here also proved too much of an obstacle. Many French soldiers drowned while they valiantly tried to cross this deep watercourse. One of the casualties was the French general David. When four British gunboats under Captain Popham, manoeuvring closely inshore, started to fire on his flank, Vandamme fell back to his starting positions.

The losses on the Franco-Batavian side far outweighed the British losses: 1,876 dead and wounded against 184. The defeat did not miss its effect on the morale of the Batavian troops. During the night a false rumor of a British attack caused panic among the troops of Daendels' division. Their flight was stopped at Daendels' headquarters in St. Pancras, but a few of the fleeing troopers reached Alkmaar where they caused more panic. Some even fled as far as Haarlem. Brune was not amused.

== Aftermath ==
After the battle Russian and British reinforcements arrived in Den Helder and the Anglo-Russian forces soon amounted to 40,000 men. The Duke of York, having assumed supreme command of the Anglo-Russian expeditionary force, decided to exploit this numerical superiority. He made an attempt to break out of his bridgehead in the Zijpe polder on 19 September. This resulted in the Battle of Bergen (1799) which, though ending in a tactical draw, failed to attain the British objectives. Only the following October did he manage to force a Franco-Batavian retreat in the Battle of Alkmaar (1799). A few days later, at the Battle of Castricum the Franco-Batavian forces prevailed again and York had to withdraw to the Zijpe polder. His dire position then forced him to sue for an honorable capitulation in the form of the Convention of Alkmaar.

== Sources ==
- The campaign in Holland, 1799, by a subaltern (1861) W. Mitchell
- (in French) Jomini, A.H. (1822) Histoire Critique Et Militaire Des Guerres de la Revolution: Nouvelle Edition, Redigee Sur de Nouveaux Documens, Et Augmentee D'un Grand Nombre de Cartes Et de Plans (tome xv, ch. xciii)
- (in Dutch) Krayenhoff, C.R.T. (1832) Geschiedkundige Beschouwing van den Oorlog op het grondgebied der Bataafsche Republiek in 1799. J.C. Vieweg
- (in Russian) Milyutin, D.A. (1853) История войны России с Францией в царствование Императора Павла I в 1799 году [The history of Russia's war with France during the reign of Emperor Paul I in 1799]. Vol. 5. St. Petersburg: Типография штаба военно-учебных заведений.
- Schama, S. (1977), Patriots and Liberators. Revolution in the Netherlands 1780-1813, New York, Vintage books, ISBN 0-679-72949-6

Preceded by Battle of Novi (1799)	French Revolution: Revolutionary campaigns Battle of Krabbendam	Succeeded by Battle of Gotthard Pass (1799)
