= Battle of Ostrołęka (1807) =

1807 Battle during the War of the Fourth Coalition

- Part of the War of the Fourth Coalition
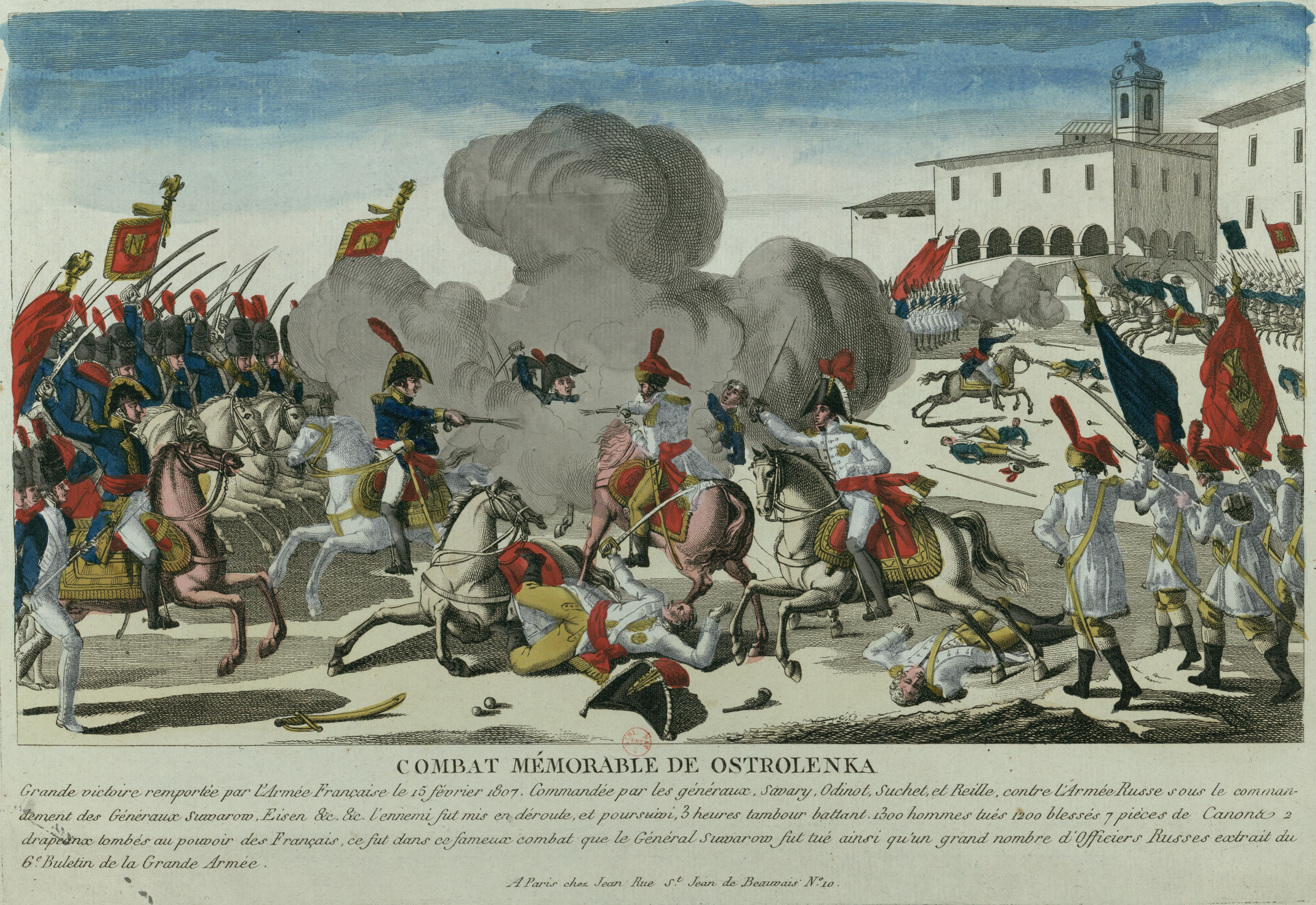
- Memorable combat of Ostrolenka, contemporary print in the Bibliothèque nationale de France
Date	16 February 1807
Location	Ostrołęka, present-day Poland 53°05′00″N 21°35′00″E
Result	French victory

Belligerents
(France) French Empire	(Russia) Russian Empire

Commanders and leaders
(France) Anne Jean Marie René Savary (France) Honoré Charles Reille (France) Louis-Gabriel Suchet (France) Nicolas Oudinot	(Russia) Ivan Essen (Russia) Leonty Bennigsen (Russia) Maj. Gen. Suvorov †

Strength
20,000	18,000 to 25,000

Casualties and losses
60 dead (including 1 general); 400–500 wounded Total: 460–1,200	1,300 dead (including 2 generals); 1,200 wounded (including 3 generals); Total: 2,200–2,500 up to 7 cannons captured

War of the Fourth Coalition
⬤ current battle
⬤ Napoleon not in command
⬤ Napoleon in command

The Battle of Ostrołęka was a meeting engagement fought on 16 February 1807 between a French force under General of Division Anne Jean Marie René Savary and a Russian force under Lieutenant General Ivan Essen.

After the Battle of Eylau, both armies settled down for the winter. The Russian commander-in-chief, General of the Cavalry Leonty Bennigsen, carried out an operation against the French with the aim of disorganizing them, and it was for this purpose that the Russian corps under Essen attacked. The operation failed due to a lack of timely support between Essen's units. Once at Castricum (1799), similar delays by Essen and Abercromby also led to setbacks for the Allied forces, costing the campaign its defeat. Savary and his men learned about the operation in advance, though, intercepting a courier officer with orders from Essen, therefore Savary was more prepared. The French defeated the Russians in detail, inflicting disproportionately heavy losses (as per a bulletin of the Grande Armée, Essen lost 1,300 dead and 1,200 wounded), and forced them to retreat to the east to Wysokie Mazowieckie. Weather conditions caused both sides to go into winter quarters immediately after the battle, which occurred during the War of the Fourth Coalition, part of the Napoleonic Wars. Ostrołęka is located in the northeast part of modern Poland, but in 1807 it belonged to the Kingdom of Prussia.

== Background ==
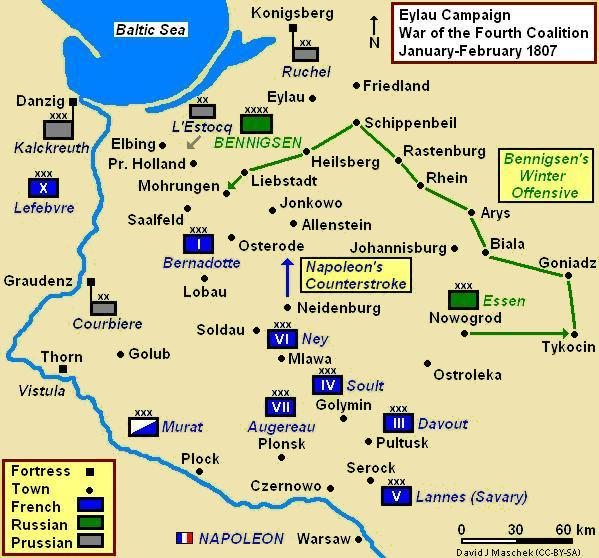
Eylau Campaign Map. While the main armies battled at Mohrungen and Eylau in East Prussia, Savary and Essen faced each other at Ostrołęka.

Savary was in command of the V Corps on the extreme French right so as to guard the approaches to Warsaw by the Narew and Bug, and to cover the right rear of the movement northwards. After the French were driven out of Ostrów on 3 February, Savary received orders to abandon Brok and retire upon Ostrolenka (Ostrołęka), so as to strengthen his communication with the Emperor's army. Essen was ordered by Bennigsen to drive back Savary, who, at the same time, had made up his mind to assume the offensive.

Essen, with 25,000 men, advanced to Ostrolenka on the 15th, along the two banks of the Narew. Savary decided to hold Ostrolenka on the defensive, on 15 February, leaving 3 brigades on the low hills outside Ostrolenka flanked by batteries on the opposite bank, whilst he assumed the offensive on the morning of the 16th against the Russian force coming down the right bank.

== Course ==
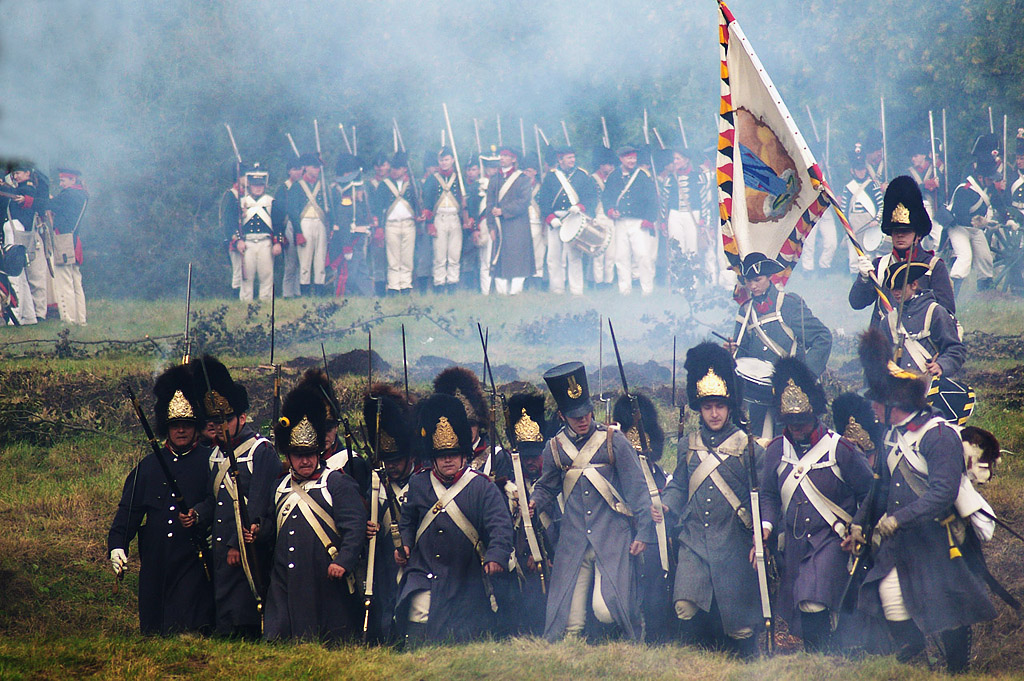
Historical reenactment of the Battle of Ostrołęka, 2007

Early on 16 February, General of Division Honoré Théodore Maxime Gazan arrived at the vanguard with part of his division. Savary learned of the planned sabotage in advance by intercepting an officer with a report from Essen. At 9 a.m. Gazan met the enemy on the road to Nowogród and attacked. Essen's Russian subordinate, General Dmitry Volkonsky [ru], initially pressed the inferior French, but then they received reinforcements and overthrew him by superior forces, outflanking him in the process. Because of Volkonsky's rout, at the very same moment the Russians under Essen attacked Ostrołęka by the left bank, to support him. General of Brigade François Frédéric Campana, with a brigade from Gazan's division, and General of Brigade François Amable Ruffin, with a brigade from General of Division Nicolas Charles Oudinot's division, defended the town. Savary sent General of Division Honoré Charles Reille, his chief of staff. The Russian infantry, in many columns, wished to take the city but the French let them advance halfway up the streets before charging them, leaving the streets covered with the dead. The Russians abandoned the town; Essen was overturned, but he saved Volkonsky from destruction—for Essen it was enough. He took up positions behind the sand hills that covered it.

Oudinot and General of Division Louis Gabriel Suchet and their divisions advanced and by midday, the heads of their columns arrived at Ostrołęka. Oudinot commanded the left in two lines, whilst Suchet commanded the centre and Reille, commanding a brigade of Gazan's division, formed the right. He "covered himself with all his artillery and marched against the enemy." Oudinot put himself at the head of a successful cavalry charge, cutting the Cossacks in the enemy's rearguard to pieces. The exchange of fire was brisk. The Russian army gave way on all sides, and was followed fighting for three leagues. They held the French until the evening.

== Aftermath ==
The next day the Russians were "pursued several leagues." Two Russian generals and several other Russian officers were killed and three generals wounded. According to the 63rd bulletin of the Grande Armée (28 February 1807), the Russians left 1,200 wounded and 1,300 dead on the battlefield, with between 3 and 7 cannon and two flags captured by the French. Only 60 French troops were killed, including Campana whose death was much grieved by Napoleon, with 400 to 500 wounded including Colonel Duhamel of the 21st Light Infantry Regiment and artillery Colonel Henri Marie Lenoury.

On Napoleon's orders, the V Corps went into winter quarters along the right banks of the Omulew and the Narew down to Serock, holding Ostrolenka with a detachment and repairing the bridge there. The thaw was "dreadful" and the season allowed for no more campaigning – the enemy had left their winter quarters first, and "repented it."

Savary's action at Ostrolenka had revealed "that the Russians were in no great strength on this side, and that Napoleon had little to fear from any attempt to strike his communications with Warsaw." Oudinot was made a Count of the Empire and given a donation of a million francs. Savary received the Légion d'honneur.

The Battle of Ostrołęka is mentioned at the Galerie des Batailles at Versailles and on the Arc de Triomphe in Paris, and is a battle honour of several French regiments.

== Citations ==
Preceded by Battle of Eylau	Napoleonic Wars; Battle of Ostrołęka (1807)	Succeeded by Siege of Kolberg (1807)
