= Michel-Marie Pacthod =

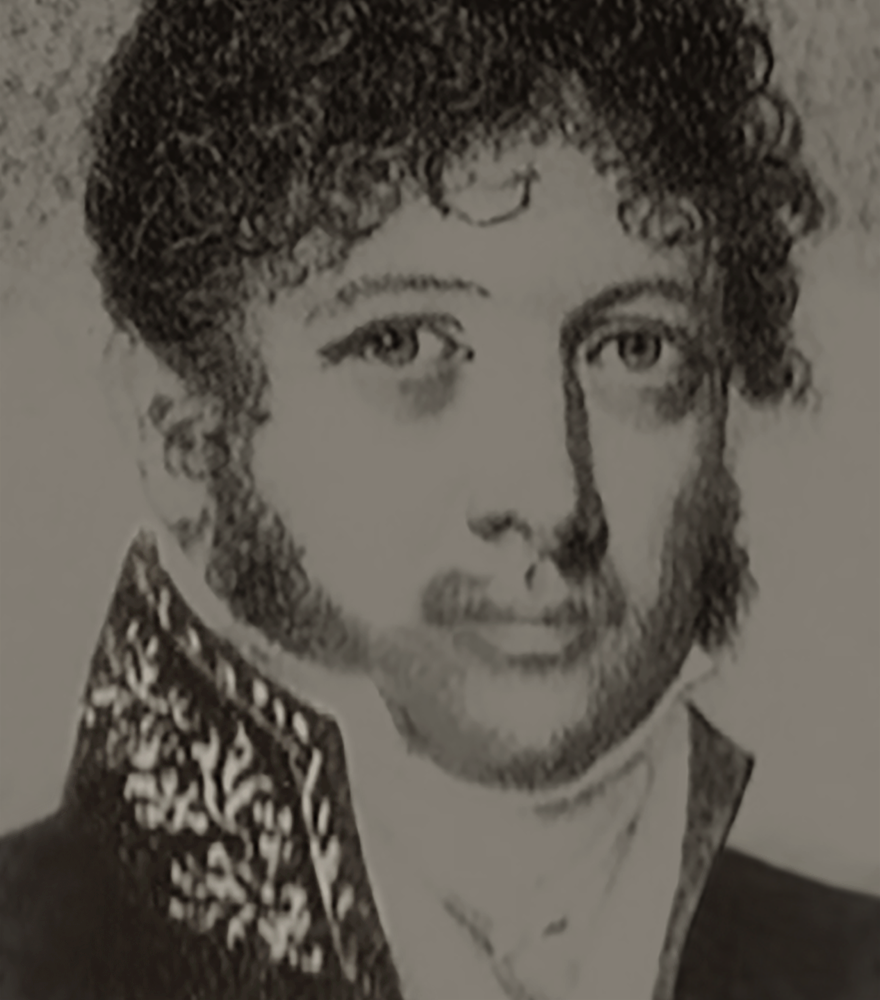
- General Count Michel-Marie Pacthod
- Born: 16 January 1764; Saint-Julien-en-Genevois, France
- Died: 24 March 1830 (aged 66); Paris, France
- Burial place: Père Lachaise Cemetery
- Military career
- Allegiance: Kingdom of Sardinia; Kingdom of France (1791-1792); (France) French First Republic; (France) First French Empire; Kingdom of France (Bourbon Restoration)
- Service years: 1792–1815
- Rank: General of Division
- Commands: Infantry
- Conflicts: French Revolutionary Wars; Napoleonic Wars
- Awards: Baron, the Count of the Empire
- Other work: General Inspector of Infantry

Michel-Marie, Count Pacthod (French pronunciation: [miʃɛl maʁi pakto]; 1764–1830) was a French officer during the French Revolutionary Wars and Napoleonic Wars, who rose to the rank of General of Division in 1808. A competent and brave infantry commander, his career was much affected by a 1795 incident, while he was the military commander of Marseille, and failed to come to the aid of Napoleon Bonaparte's family, which had taken refuge in the city.

== Early career ==
Born on the 16 January 1764 in the town of Saint-Julien-en-Genevois, then a part of Piedmont, Pacthod joined the King's Life Guards, but France soon occupied his country and the French-speaking Pacthod rallied to the ideas of the French Revolution. He was elected lieutenant-colonel by the volunteers of the Mont-Blanc department and then sent to serve in the Siege of Toulon, where he was wounded seven times. He was deputy to the chief of staff of the French expeditionary force destined to Corsica and then, in January 1795, appointed to the military command of Marseille. He was holding this command when the family of General Napoleon Bonaparte, which had fled their native Corsica during the British occupation of the island, took refuge in the city. The Bonapartes had fled Corsica in order to escape possible retaliation from the British occupants and arrived destitute in Marseille. It seems that Pacthod showed little generosity towards the Bonapartes, a behaviour which Napoleon would never forgive. His career did advance quickly during the following years, seeing promotion to brigadier general in May 1795, and was noted for his actions at the Battle of Alkmaar and Battle of Castricum.

== Napoleonic Wars and beyond ==
The rise to power of Napoleon, who became Emperor of the French in 1804, blocked Pacthod's promotion for several years, despite his numerous feats of arms. With the outbreak of the Napoleonic Wars, Pacthod took a notable part to the Battle of Halle and Battle of Lübeck in 1806, was wounded at the Battle of Mohrungen and fought at the Battle of Friedland. Marshal of the Empire Jean-Baptiste Bernadotte, who had been his Corps commander throughout the 1806–07 War of the Fourth Coalition, proposed Pacthod's promotion to General of Division on several occasions, but Napoleon refused. Nevertheless, after fighting brilliantly in several actions in the Peninsular War, especially at Durango (31 October 1808) and Espinosa (10 November 1808), he finally received promotion to the top military rank in the French army, while also being created a Baron of the Empire. In 1809, he fought in the War of the Fifth Coalition, as a part of the "Army of Italy", and took part to the victories of Raab and Wagram. Despite this distinguished service, he was given secondary commands, in the French "Army of Naples", then the "Army of Illyria" and was only able to rejoin the Grande Armée in 1813, for the War of the Sixth Coalition. Following the Battle of Bautzen, Napoleon created him a Count of the Empire (22 May 1813) and less than a week later, Pacthod captured 8,000 Prussians, at the Battle of Hoyerswerda (27 May 1813). During the 1814 campaign for the defense of France, Pacthod was present at virtually every major engagement and was heroic at the Battle of Fère-Champenoise, where he was wounded and taken prisoner. During the Hundred Days Pacthod refused to serve Napoleon and for this he was rewarded by the Bourbon Restoration by being named General Inspector for Infantry, a prestigious position, which was to be the last of his active service.

The name PACTHOD is one of the names inscribed under the Arc de Triomphe in Paris.

== Sources ==
- Fierro, Alfredo; Palluel-Guillard, André; Tulard, Jean – "Histoire et Dictionnaire du Consulat et de l'Empire”, Éditions Robert Laffont, ISBN 2-221-05858-5
