= Henri Damas Bonhomme =

Dutch army officer and statesman

Lt Gen Henri Damas Bonhomme

Minister of War
- In office July 29, 1806 – November 24, 1806
- Monarch: Louis Bonaparte
- Succeeded by: Jan Willem Janssens

Governor-general of the Department Friesland
- In office November 24, 1806 – February 16, 1807

Mayor of Surhuizum
- In office January 1, 1812 – January 1, 1814

Personal details
- Born: September 10, 1747 Maastricht
- Died: February 7, 1826 (aged 78) Surhuizum, Netherlands
- Profession: Military Officer
- Awards: Order of Merit

Military service
- Rank: Lieutenant-General
- Unit: Légion Franche Etrangère
- Battles/wars: War of the Second Coalition; Battle of Krabbendam; Battle of Castricum; Battle of Alkmaar

Henri Damas Bonhomme (September 10, 1747 – February 7, 1826) was an awarded Dutch army officer and statesman of the Batavian Republic and Kingdom of Holland. He served as Minister of War for King Louis Bonaparte, prior to the annexation of the Holland, later as governor-general of the Department Friesland, and retired to serve as a mayor in Surhuizum.

== Biography ==
Bonhomme was born on September 10, 1747 to Caspar Bonhomme and Elizabeth Koningh in Maastricht.

As the son of an infantry captain his military career began early, he entered the military service at the age of eleven in 1758, serving in the Lindtman Infantry Regiment. In 1772, he would join his father in the Van Bylandt Infantry Regiment where he would eventually be given command of a grenadier company, until he was transferred to the Pallardy Infantry Regiment as a Major in May of 1787.

In August of 1792, Bonhomme was selected to serve as a Lieutenant Colonel of the newly established Légion Franche Etrangère, a precursor to the Foreign Legion.

Bonhomme married Hermanna Hillegonde Geertsema on August 30, 1795.

After the Revolution of 1795, Bonhomme was appointed Major General. He used the position to select the commanders of several Demi-brigades while serving underneath Herman Willem Daendels.

During the Anglo-Russian invasion of Holland, Bonhomme would participate in several battles. He took command of Dumonceau's division when the commanding officer had been wounded on September 10, 1799 at the Battle of Krabbendam. Bonhomme held the position until October 9th of that year, leading the division at both the Battle of Castricum and Battle of Alkmaar, after which Dumonceau recuperated. During this period, despite holding the position he did not maintain sole command of the unit.

Bonhomme was later appointed Minister of War under King Louis Bonaparte, prior to the annexation of the Kingdom of Holland, on July 29, 1806. He served in that position until November 24 of that year, when he was replaced by Jan Willem Janssens.

Bonhomme would the go on to serve as governor-general of the Department Friesland, appointed to the position on November 24, 1806 and remained there until February 16, 1807. While serving in this capacity he would participate in the continental blockade against England and was tasked with introducing a new Salt Tax. He would also convene what would be the final parliament of the East Frisian Estates in March of 1807.

On August 14, 1808, Bonhomme was promoted alongside Joseph Tarsyre to the rank of Lieutenant-General within the King's Guard.

Bonhomme retired in 1809 as a childless widower. He moved to his estate in the village of Surhuizum where he served as its mayor from January 1, 1812, to January 1, 1814, when the position was abolished, and would continue as its bailiff until October 1, 1816. While there, he devoted himself to his passion, horse breeding. Bonhomme, serving as mayor would save the local Mennonite population from Russian Cossacks who had grown restless and began threatening the community during the liberation of the Netherlands from France.

Bonhomme died on February 7, 1826 in Surhuizum. He bequeathed much of his wealth to charitable causes upon his death.

== Awards ==
- Knight of the Order of Merit

== See Also ==
- Dutch Parliament Entry
