= Magnus Gustav von Essen =

Baltic German military figure (1759–1813)

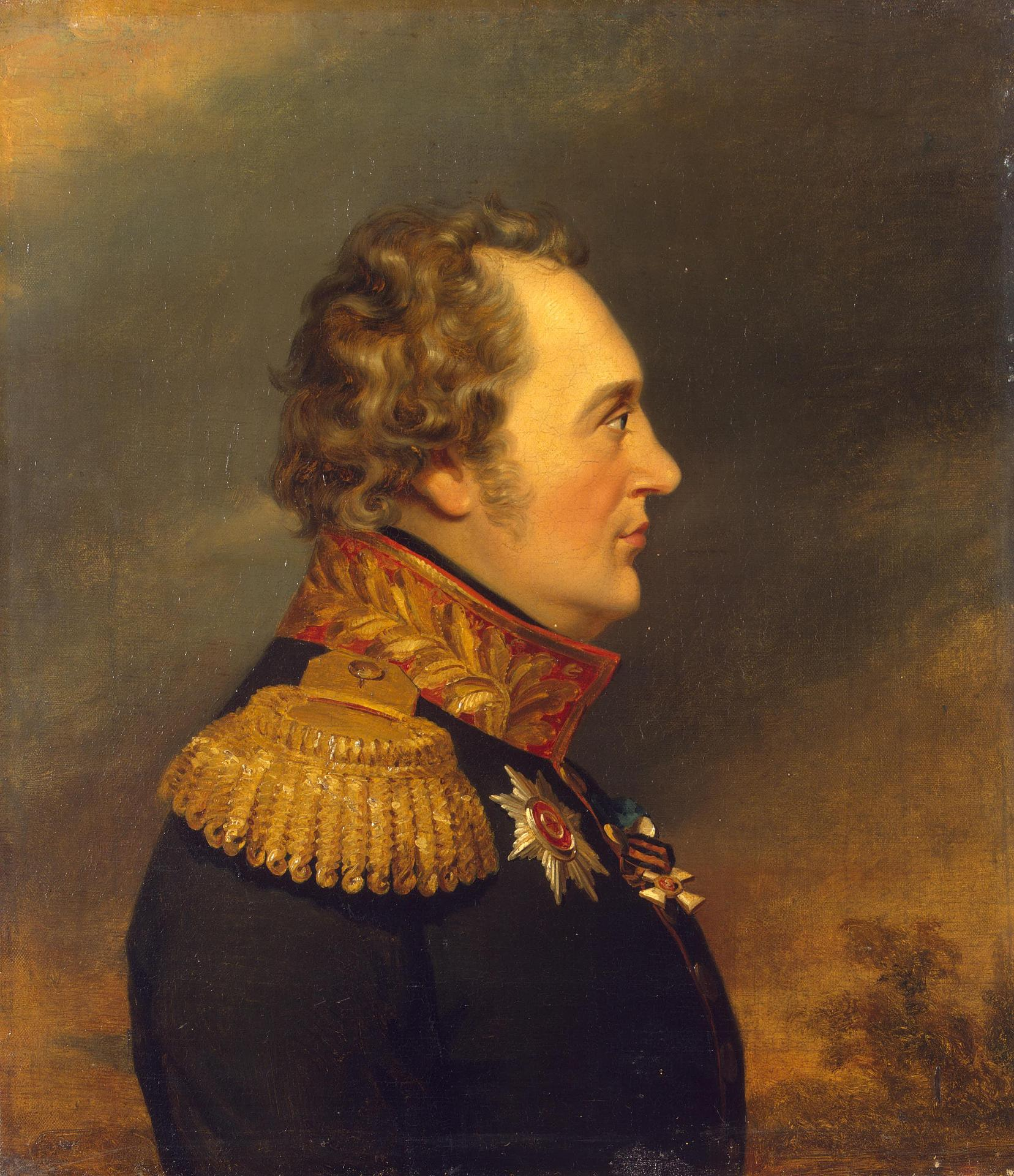
- Portrait by George Dawe (1823–1825)
- Born: 30 September [O.S. 19 September] 1759; Pöddes Manor, Governorate of Estonia, Russian Empire
- Died: 20 July [O.S. 8 July] 1813 (aged 53); Baldohn, Courland Governorate, Russian Empire
- Military career
- Allegiance: Russia
- Rank: Lieutenant general
- Conflicts: Kościuszko Uprising; Battle of Maciejowice; War of the Second Coalition; Battle of Alkmaar; Battle of Castricum; War of the Fourth Coalition; Battle of Ostrołęka; Battle of Friedland (WIA); Patriotic War of 1812; Siege of Riga; Battle of Dahlenkirchen
- Awards: Order of St George, 4th degree

Magnus Gustav von Essen or Ivan Nikolayevich Essen (Russian: Иван Николаевич Эссен; 30 September [O.S. 19 September] 1759 – 20 July [O.S. 8 July] 1813) was a Russian lieutenant general of Baltic German origin and the military governor of Riga at the start of the Patriotic War of 1812.

== Life ==
=== Pre-1812 ===
From the Essen family in Estonia, from 1783 to 1785 he fought in Poland, where he was seriously injured. He fought in the Russo-Swedish War (1788–1790) as well as Russia's 1792 and 1794 Polish campaigns. For his service at the Battle of Maciejowice he was awarded the 4th degree of the Order of St George.

In 1799 he commanded the first division in the Anglo-Russian invasion of Holland under the command of general Johann Hermann von Fersen. From 1802 he was the military governor of Smolensk. He then fought in the 1807 war against Napoleon, being seriously wounded at Friedland.

=== 1812 ===
During the Patriotic War of 1812 he served as Military Governor of Riga in place of Dimitri Lobanov-Rostovsky and was forced to set fire to Riga's suburbs as soon as the enemy captured their outermost edge. After unsuccessful attempts to stop the Prussians at a distance from the city and unsuccessfully fighting to save Iecava, he ordered the burning of the suburbs but because of a strong wind the fire got out of control and thousands of city residents were left homeless.

Towards the autumn, the war changed direction. The Prussian corps became overextended, Macdonald remained inactive, a Russian success was won by Peter Wittgenstein at Polotsk, Napoleon began a general retreat and Fabian Steinheil arrived in Riga – all these circumstances brought Essen to the top of the pile, but due to mismanagement, the Russians were unable to capitalise on these victories and suffered heavy losses in several battles. In October, Essen was replaced in his post by General Paulucci and filed his resignation.

Essen then went for a long course of treatment at the Baldone sulphur baths near Riga, where he drowned on 23 August 1813 while swimming. According to one version of events, he committed suicide on the anniversary of the firing of the Riga suburbs.

== Family ==
His father was Claus Gustav von Essen, a statesman, and his mother was Magdalena Elisabeth von Stackelberg. Essen married Margaretha von Stackelberg in 1796, they had a daughter, Elisabeth Anna Dorothea, who was married to the Russian general Carl Magnus von der Pahlen.

== In fiction ==
He is portrayed in The Commodore, novel of the Horatio Hornblower series.

== Sources ==
- (in Russian) Dictionary of Russian generals, members of hostilities against the army of Napoleon Bonaparte in the 1812-1815 war. / / The Russian archive: Sat. — М .: студия «ТРИТЭ» Н.Михалкова, 1996. - M.: Studio «TRITE» N. Mikhalkov, 1996. — Т. VII. - Vol VII. — С. 630-631. - S. 630-631.
