= Krabbendam =

- Village
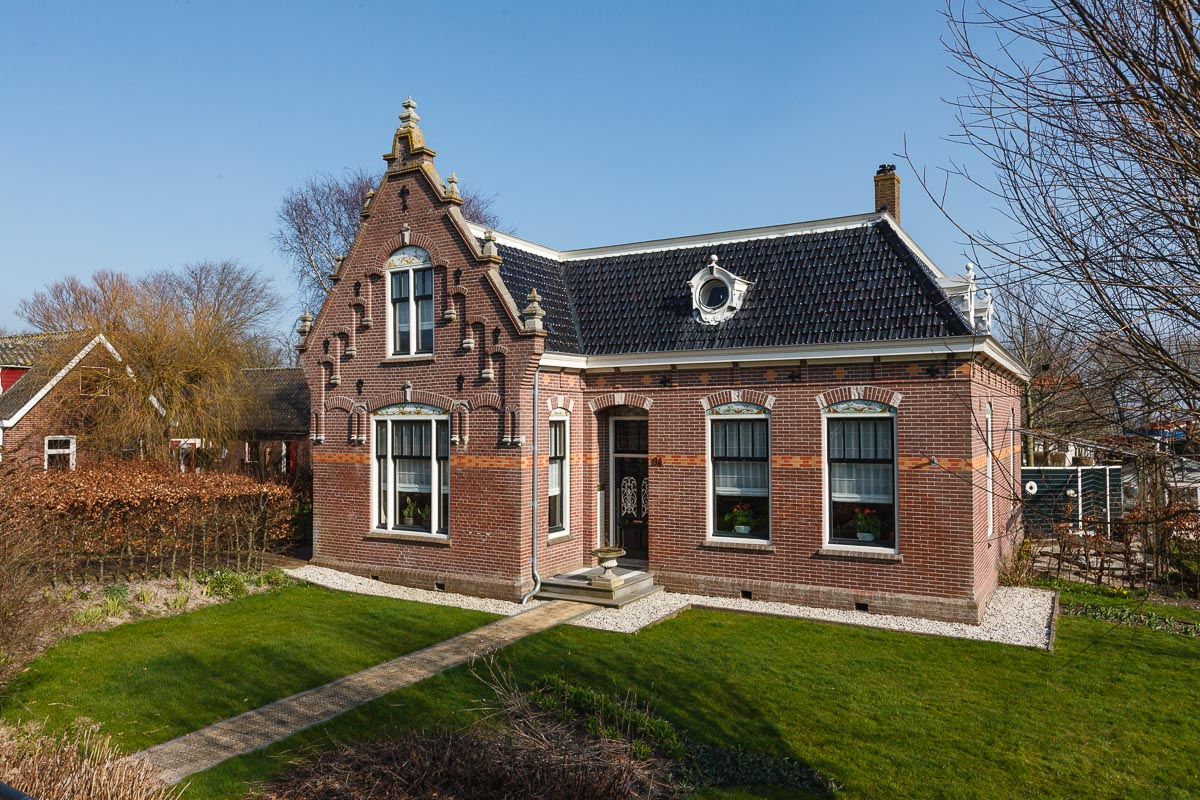
- Westfriesedijk 64, Krabbendam

- Location in the Netherlands Location in the province of North Holland in the Netherlands
- Coordinates: 52°44′N 4°42′E
- Country: Netherlands
- Province: North Holland
- Municipality: Schagen

Area
  - Total: 0.84 km^{2} (0.32 sq mi)
- Elevation: 0.0 m (0 ft)

Population (2025)
  - Total: 135
  - Density: 160/km^{2} (420/sq mi)
- Time zone: UTC+1 (CET)
  - Summer (DST): UTC+2 (CEST)
- Postal code: 1749
- Dialing code: 0226

Krabbendam is a village in the Dutch province of North Holland. It is a part of the municipality of Schagen, and lies about 10 km north of Alkmaar.

== History ==
The village was first mentioned in 1413 or 1414 as Crabbendamme. A "krabbendam" is an engineer's term for a structure of poles in front of a dike to break the waves and diminish the impact on the dike. There is no relation with crabs. Almost the entire village was destroyed during the Battle of Krabbendam. Krabbendam was home to 109 people in 1840. The Reformed Church was built in 1846, and is nowadays used for weddings and cultural activities.

== Gallery ==
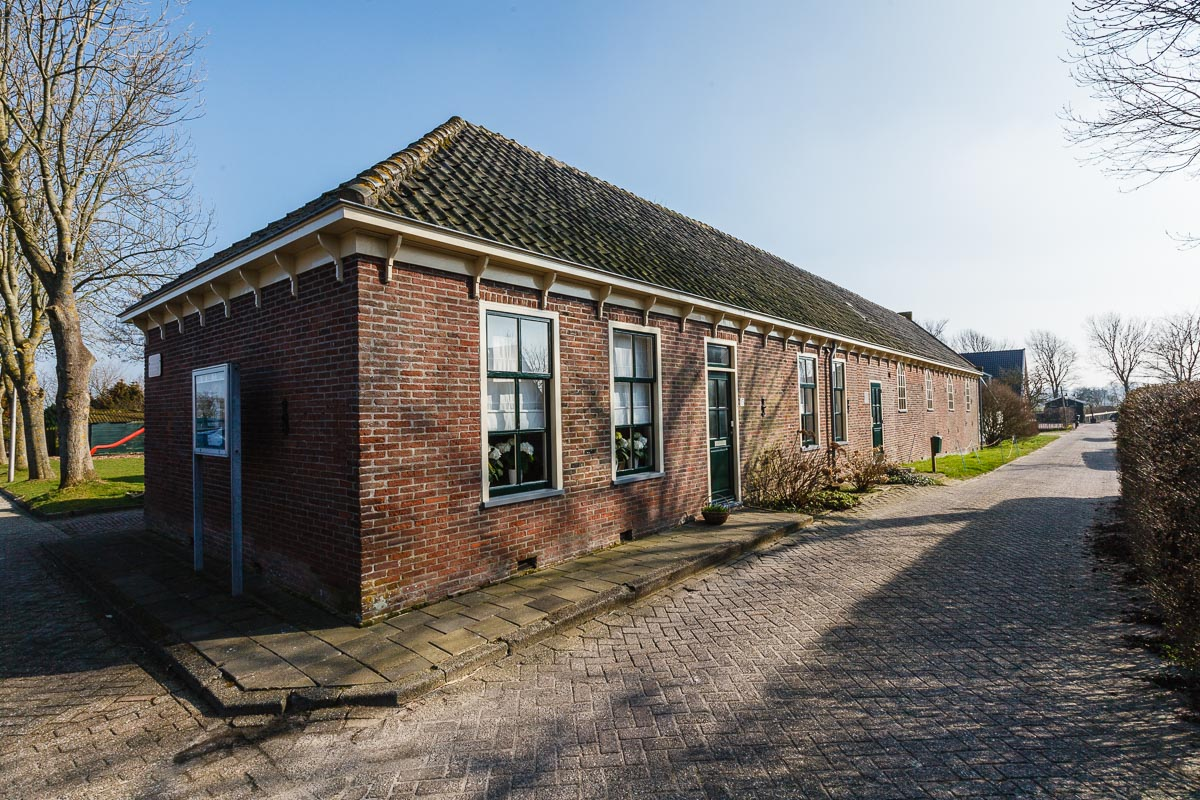
Reformed Church of Krabbendam
