= Battle of Castricum =

Battle of the War of the Second Coalition

- Part of the Anglo-Russian invasion of Holland
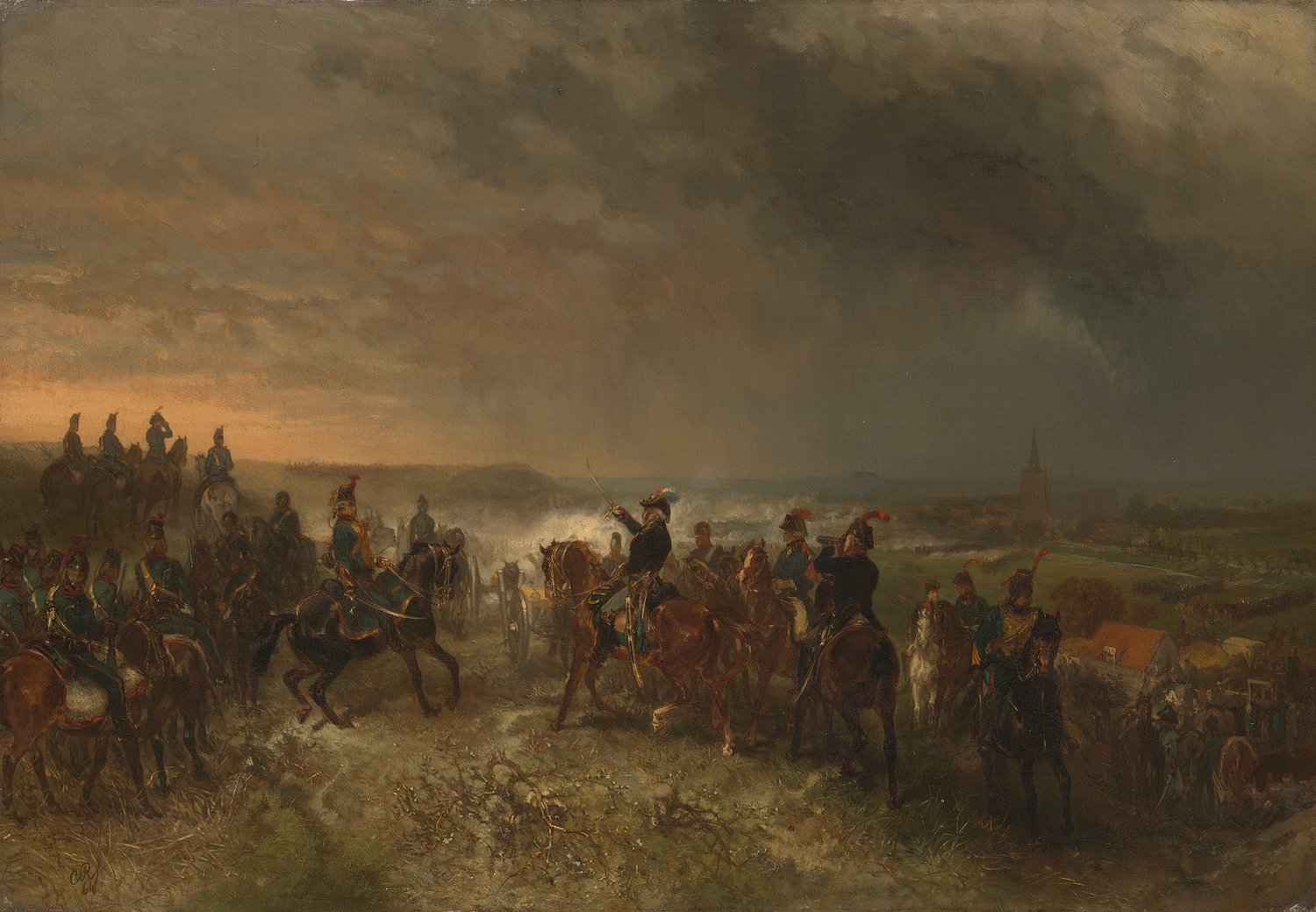
- The Battle of Castricum; Charles Rochussen, 1863
Date	6 October 1799
Location	Castricum, Batavian Republic 52.5500°N 4.6667°E
Result	Franco-Batavian victory

Belligerents
(French First Republic) French Republic; Batavian Republic	(Kingdom of Great Britain) Great Britain; Russian Empire

Commanders and leaders
(French First Republic) Guillaume Brune (French First Republic) Dominique Vandamme (French First Republic) Louis Gouvion^{[fr]} (French First Republic) Jean Boudet (French First Republic) Michel Pacthod (Batavian Republic) Herman Willem Daendels (Batavian Republic) Henri Damas Bonhomme	(Kingdom of Great Britain) Duke of York (Kingdom of Great Britain) Ralph Abercromby (Kingdom of Great Britain) John Hely-Hutchinson (Kingdom of Great Britain) Lord Chatham (WIA) (Kingdom of Great Britain) Harry Burrard (Kingdom of Great Britain) Eyre Coote (Kingdom of Great Britain) David Dundas (Russian Empire) Magnus von Essen (Russian Empire) Alexander Sedmoratsky^{[ru]} (Russian Empire) Alexander Dubiansky^{[ru]} (POW)

Strength
25,700 (~19,000 engaged); • (French First Republic) 14,000; • (Batavian Republic) 5,000	26,400 (~21,100 engaged); • (Kingdom of Great Britain) 14,000; • (Russian Empire) 7,100

Casualties and losses
1,384 killed, wounded or captured (Note: The below figures for Franco-Batavian casualties are those of a French contemporary, Brune's staff officer.); • (French First Republic) 1,142; • (Batavian Republic) 242	2,538–2,557 killed, wounded or captured; • (Kingdom of Great Britain) 1,421–1,440; • (Russian Empire) 1,117; 11 guns lost
- Location within Europe

The Battle of Castricum (October 6, 1799) (Note: O.S. 25 September. In Russian historiography it is also called the Battle of Bakkum. "Castricum" is sometimes spelled as Kastrikum.) saw a Franco-Batavian force defeat an Anglo-Russian force near Castricum, Netherlands, within the Anglo-Russian invasion of Holland. The battle was fought during the War of the Second Coalition against Revolutionary France between French–Batavian forces under the command of generals Guillaume Brune (commander-in-chief) and Herman Willem Daendels (Note: As well as Dominique Vandamme, Louis Gouvion^{[fr]}, Jean Boudet and Henri Damas Bonhomme. Daendels led the right wing.) and British–Russian forces under the command of the Duke of York (commander-in-chief) and General Ivan Essen. (Note: Also Sir James Pulteney (second-in-command), Sir Ralph Abercromby, Sir David Dundas and Alexander Sedmoratsky^{[ru]}.) The Castricum battle and its strategic outcome put an end to any hopes for the invasion's success.

At the Battle of Bergen on 19 September 1799, Brune defeated the Anglo-Russian forces piecemeal. At the battle of Castricum, in accordance with York's dispositions, the Russians launched an offensive in the center and pushed back the numerically inferior French advance units, dislodging them from their strong position around the village of Bakkum. However, they were soon counterattacked by Brune, who quickly concentrated far superior forces and recaptured the position, inflicting heavy losses. On Brune's right flank, the Batavians were attacked by British forces and were pushed back from their advanced positions in the villages of Limmen and Akersloot, but the outcome of this specific clash remained in the balance throughout the engagement. The high wind gusts from the North Sea, which blew the sounds of gunfire in the opposite direction, prevented Essen from hearing it and thus from delivering reinforcements to his vanguard more quickly. The Russians barely held out, but the late arrival of the British and the remaining Russian reinforcements halted the advance of the exhausted French and Batavians, and the inspired Russians pushed them back behind that position. Brune failed to defeat the Russians and the British alternately.

Despite this, the joint offensive by York's British and Russians stalled on the heights where Brune had organized his troops. Ralph Abercromby's British (part of York's forces) arrived late on the coastal flank, for which Abercromby was criticized; they were driven back twice by the French units stationed on this flank and suffered heavy losses. This was because General Louis Gouvion – Brune's subordinate placed in command there – had been able to prepare formidable defensive positions. At the cost of heavy casualties, York only succeeded in pushing Brune back some distance in the central and left sectors and, as a result, to capture the three villages mentioned; but he was unable to break through Brune's defensive lines. The Anglo-allied command decided on a full retreat. Castricum soured relations between York and Essen, and in general between the British and Russian armies. Brune's behavior showed him to be a capable military commander.

== Background ==
An Anglo-Russian force of 32,000 men landed in North Holland on August 27, 1799, captured a Batavian Navy fleet at Den Helder on August 30 and the city of Alkmaar on October 3. Following a series of battles at Bergen on September 19 and Alkmaar on October 2 (also known as 2nd Bergen), they faced the French and Batavian armies at Castricum on October 6.

== Actions ==
=== Initial action ===
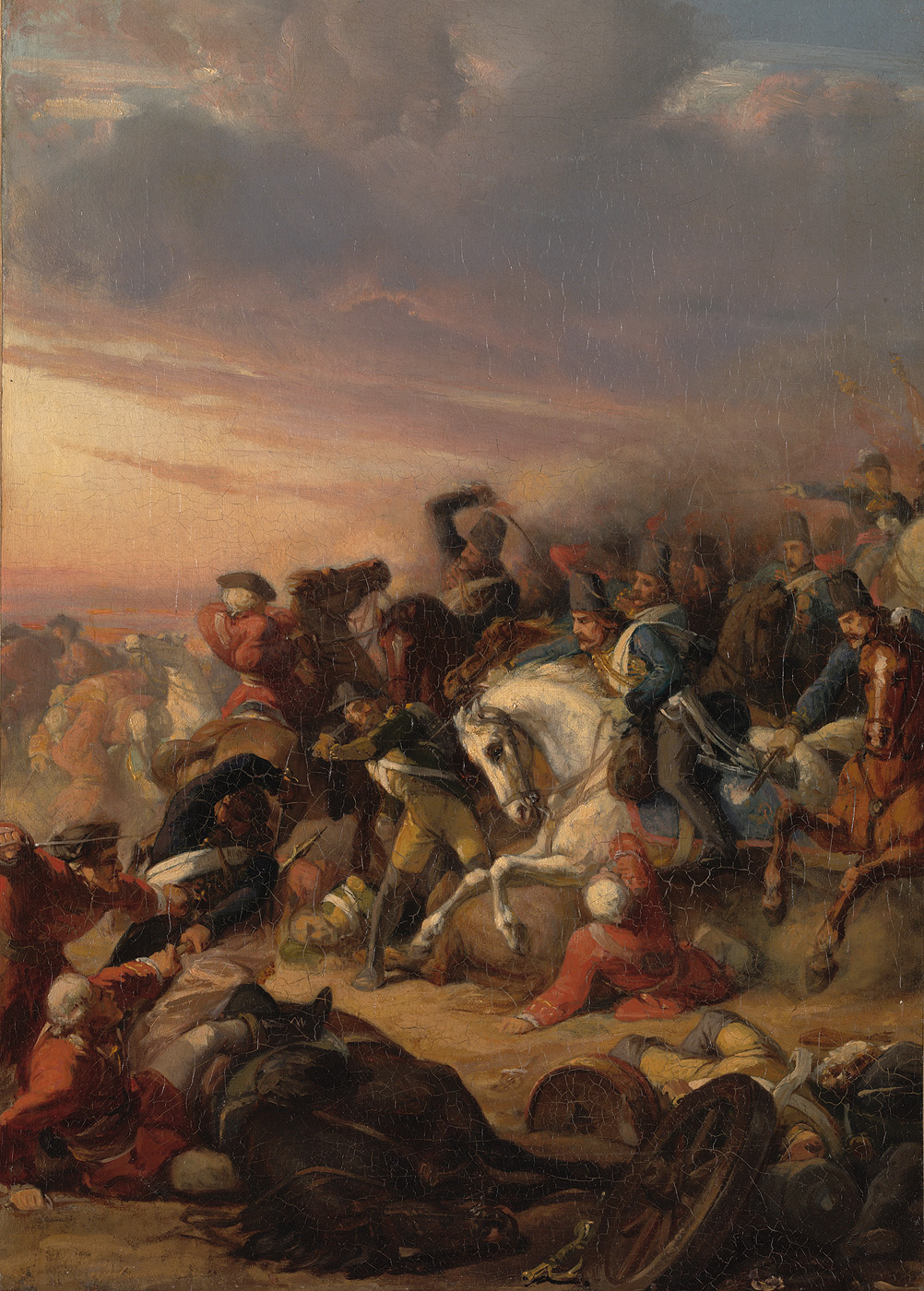
Anno 1799, the Battle of Castricum, by Jan Antoon Neuhuys

York decided to advance his troops. The Coalition command began to act according to the disposition. The battle began at 8 AM. The Russian vanguard, commanded by Major General Alexander Sedmoratsky, consisting of 6 battalions and 7 guns, drove some of the French troops out of the fortifications of Bakkum, which were armed with artillery. As a result, the Russians captured the village. French Brigadier General Michel Pacthod, retreating to the village of Castricum, assembled the 43rd demi-brigade consisting of 3 battalions. Russian battalions attacked from the front under the cover of artillery, while grenadiers and part of the jaegers occupied sandy heights on the right to fire upon the village. Threatened by encirclement, the French retreated behind Castricum into gardens and onto sandy hillocks.

On the opposite wing, Lieutenant General Dundas' 2 British brigades under the command of Maj. Gen. Harry Burrard and Maj. Gen. Eyre Coote moved from Alkmaar to Akersloot, driving out 2 Batavian battalions and taking about 100 prisoners of war. They occupied Akerlsloot and Limmen, receiving orders to stop and defend.

=== Second phase ===
Brune, upon learning of the encounter, initially intended to defend his positions and gave corresponding orders. However, noticing Sedmoratsky's isolation, he decided to go on the offensive. As at Bergen, the British did not hurry to assist; on the French left flank, where Lt. Gen. Abercromby's units were supposed to strike, everything was calm at this time. The French division under Divisional general Jean Boudet advanced, connected with Pacthod, and attacked the Russian vanguard. Sedmoratsky had 2 battalions in Castricum, the artillery in front of Castricum and 3 other battalions on the heights, firstly from Benkendorff regiment, secondly of combined grenadiers of Ericson regt.

Major General Essen was in Egmond-Binnen, awaiting news from Sedmoratsky, which took a long time to arrive—the sounds of gunfire were inaudible due to a strong wind from the north, blowing the sounds of gunfire in the opposite direction. Sedmoratsky had no aides-de-camp on horseback and was on foot himself. Finally, upon learning about the situation, Essen sent Colonel Alexander Dubiansky^{[ru]} with 3 combined grenadier battalions and 6 guns. However, this reinforcement was insignificant compared to Brune's forces—he had 11 battalions with artillery and cavalry support. The Russians fought stubbornly, holding out for 3 hours while being pressed from two flanks. Castricum changed hands repeatedly multiple times. Essen arrived on the battlefield and ordered Emme and Zherebtsov^{[ru]} regiments to hurry (the commander of the Zherebtsov regiment himself had already died in the Battle of Bergen). The British's cautiousness on the flanks (or the Russians' intensity in the central position; or both; one way or another, the Russians acted according to York's disposition) allowed Brune to add reinforcements to the central sector in the form of several battalions from Bonhomme's Batavian division and reserves in Beverwijk; these troops were formed into a tight column and launched an attack with bayonets. The Russians suffered significant losses and were driven from their heights. A powder storm fell upon Castricum; Russian guns fell silent, their crews were killed, and cavalry also suffered losses. The French broke into the village from several sides, annihilating Russians and capturing their guns.

Exhausted and disordered, the French pursued only weakly as the Russians retreated in a single column through a narrow pass. Dubiansky, standing in the Russian rear guard with 3 battalions of grenadiers, temporarily halted the French pursuit and even counterattacked. But the grenadiers went too far. Dubiansky said about this, namely, "anyone who knows a Russian soldier understands that after his first success he cannot stand still." Captain Loven with 2 battalions of grenadiers briefly broke into Castricum but suffered heavy losses and soon found himself surrounded by the French on both sides; he and Dubiansky were both captured, as well as Lieutenant of the Artillery Riabikov and some other officers. Essen sent one aide-de-camp after another to Abercromby, but he acted at his own pace. The Duke of York gave the order for a general attack; had Abercromby acted more quickly, he could have better balanced the manpower in time by drawing some French units towards him. Although he was eventually able to do so, by that point the Russians had already suffered significant casualties; fortunately for the allies, the Russians remained intact, which allowed the allies not to be defeated in detail as at Bergen, while the French became exhausted by attacking strong Russian foothold. Brune was strengthening his positions, so delaying was a flaw.

=== British aid to Russians ===
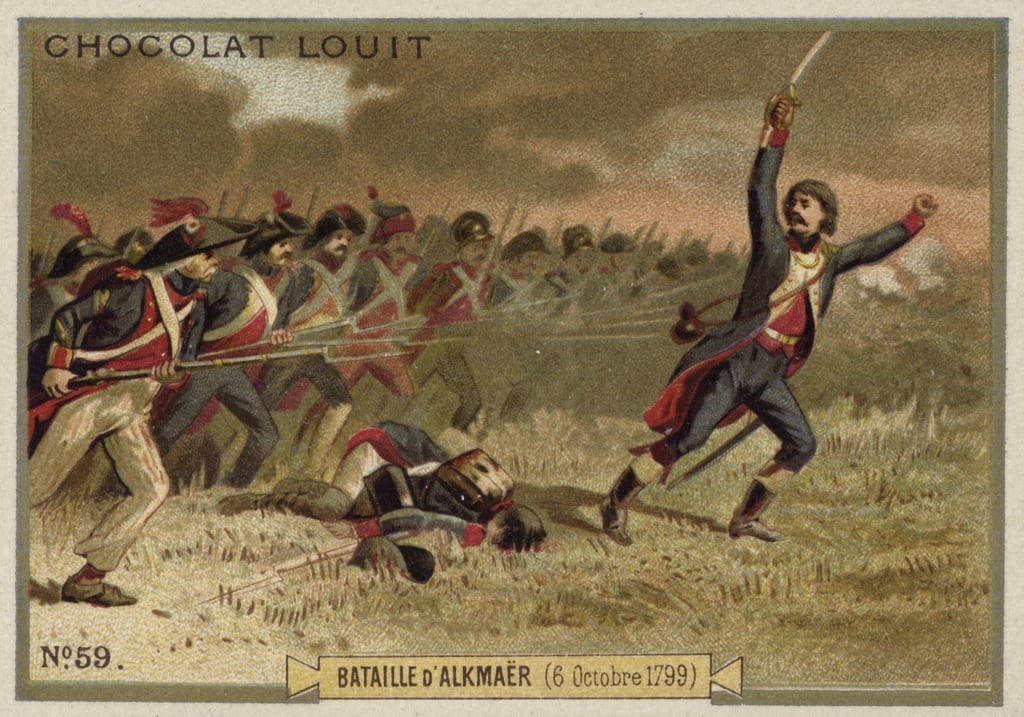
The Battle of Alkmaar (actually Castricum) on 6 October 1799; the French infantry attacks. Illustration on the Chocolat Louit chocolate cover

Finally, the British vanguard approached the battlefield around 3 PM. But the British were late. French Divisional general Louis Gouvion was already prepared to meet them: Aubrée's brigade was positioned at the seaside heights of Bakkum, Simon's brigade was in the middle of the dune, while Gouvion himself remained behind the first brigade with a reserve of 3 battalions. The British vanguard encountered a concealed artillery battery, suffered heavy losses, and retreated as far as Egmond aan Zee. Then Abercromby deployed his main forces and pushed the pressing French back again to the heights of Bakkum. He himself moved with 1 brigade from the seaside through the dunes to Bakkum, while the other 2 brigades with the vanguard were deployed against Gouvion. With Abercromby's helpful actions, Essen managed to deploy his troops behind Bakkum across the road; however, the mainly inexperienced infantry from (possibly) Lord Chatham's British brigade was engaged with and forced back by French cavalry during this. A fierce battle once again ensued between the Russians and the French on the sandy hills. Exhausted and almost out of ammunition, the Russians barely held their ground when the British column finally arrived at 5 PM. The French, as is known, were also exhausted. Supported and encouraged by a parallel British offensive of Lt. Gen. Abercromby's brigade, which was sent to the central section, the Russians charged with bayonets and pushed the French back beyond Bakkum, continuing to pressure them together with Abercromby.

However, Brune managed to position his troops on the heights of Castricum. French Divisional general Dominique Vandamme stood at the head of all the French divisions, as well as the reserve; he deployed some of his infantry to meet the Anglo-Russian forces, while Brune led the Batavian hussars in an attack against the British dragoon regiment flanking from the dunes; thus the allies' advance in the center was halted by the republican troops. The Russians had a foothold at Bakkum, and the French had at Castricum. Only the marshy Schilpwater River separated the opponents. The fighting was fierce on both flanks, but not as intense as in the center. In the dunes, Gouvion's French forces gained the upper hand over the British and almost completely encircled the enemy, who probably were under the supreme command of Maj. Gen. John Hely-Hutchinson due to the absence of Abercromby and the unclear situation with Lord Chatham. But Abercromby's personal arrival (6 PM) halted the French counteroffensive, when Gouvion was forced to abort it also due to a lack of ammunition and the assumption that he was faced with superior forces. After that, there was only sporadic gunfire. J. Fortescue's research states there is virtually no surviving testimony regarding this dune affair among British sources, and in his brief summary of the affair only Hutchinson's brigade appears, although two were deployed, as previously mentioned. Fortescue claims that the brigade did its duty well, but author J. Reiter notes it suffered heavily despite this. Fortescue was unable to determine where Lord Chatham's brigade was deployed. It was likely dispersed along the coastal and central sections. "Under so incompetent a brigadier (Lord Chatham) they were likely to come to misfortune in any position." The King's Own from Chatham's brigade lost 496 killed, wounded, and captured, including three lieutenant colonels; of that number, 352 were captured when a portion of the 2nd and 3rd battalions got separated in the dunes, got confused in the rain and smoke and "forced their way within the Enemy Lines, without knowing at all where they were". The King's Own's ranks (3 battalions) have recently been replenished with more than 2,700 selected recruits from the British Militia. In total, Chatham's brigade alone lost around 630 men that day, including Chatham himself, who was wounded and out of action. On the opposite wing, the British fought with varying success—victory shifted back and forth; the Batavian troops made some progress against the British, but having reached Limmen, they stopped at the Schilpwater, and when Bakkum was lost, they retreated back.

=== Ending and assessments ===
Darkness fell, bringing an end to the bloodshed on all fronts. Ultimately, the French were forced back to Castricum by the Russians, while the Batavians retreated to their previous position. The allies gained only villages of Bakkum, Limmen, and Akerlsloot by the end of the day, at a high cost, and in the end the Republicans regained the positions they had abandoned in the morning, except for these three villages. According to D. Milyutin's claim, about 2,500 men were casualties on the British and Russian sides together, while the Republicans suffered "no less damage" in his view. This view is based on an 1818 work (translation from English) by M. Mac-Carthy, chef de bataillon, Member of the Legion of Honour, who assumes that the Franco-Batavian casualties were not inferior. Milyutin also cites the French official estimate of casualties at 1,384 men and A.-H. Jomini's statement, who "believes" that the French lost up to 2,000. Russo-British casualties are also based on precise and official reports, but, being already higher than the Republican official ones, they are not subject to inflate in the authorities mentioned. G. Bodart gave similar figures for losses to Milyutin for the Republicans (1,400) and separately for the British (1,500) and Russians (1,100). A modern British point of view, based on older British authorities, suggests that the Russians may have actually lost up to 1,800 men, making the total Coalition loss around 3,200. The Duke reported to Paul I that the Russians were overly "impetuous," without admitting guilt on the part of the British command. Less than half of the Anglo-Russian forces that landed in Holland remained in their field army. There were issues with Anglo-Russian supplies. In the autumn's inclement weather, the number of sick increased. Generals Abercromby, Pulteney and Dundas suggested retreating to Zijpe to await reinforcements from London. Before the battle, the Duke hoped that the anticipated success at Castricum would change the situation, but subsequent events proved otherwise, resulting in the flight of both the British and Russians from the battlefield of Castricum.

Were we to sustain a severe check, I much doubt if the discipline of the troops would be sufficient to prevent a total dissolution of the army. This is melancholy, and is the natural consequence of young soldiers and inexperienced officers—all-powerful if attacked, but without resource if beaten.

— Sir Ralph Abercromby

It seems certain that the Duke of York had intended only to drive in the French outposts on the 6th, and to advance in force on the following day; and the British blamed Essen for carrying his troops too far forward in contempt of the Duke's orders. Since Essen, by all accounts, refused to have any dealing with the Duke and made a point of disobeying his commands, this may well have been the case; but the fact remains that the Duke allowed the whole of his force to drift into a general action for no particular object, without the slightest idea how to control it. He was, in fact, in Alkmaar, with one of his staff perched on the top of the church-spire and with aides-de-camp flying in all directions to discover what had become of his army. The country, as has been told, was extremely difficult and intricate; the rain was falling in torrents; the smoke hung thickly among the trees; and in all directions were bodies of troops engaging whatever enemy came first to hand, and advancing or retiring, sometimes in great disorder, according as they were the weaker or the stronger party. […] The Russians were disheartened, and there was no friendly feeling between them and the British.

— Sir John Fortescue

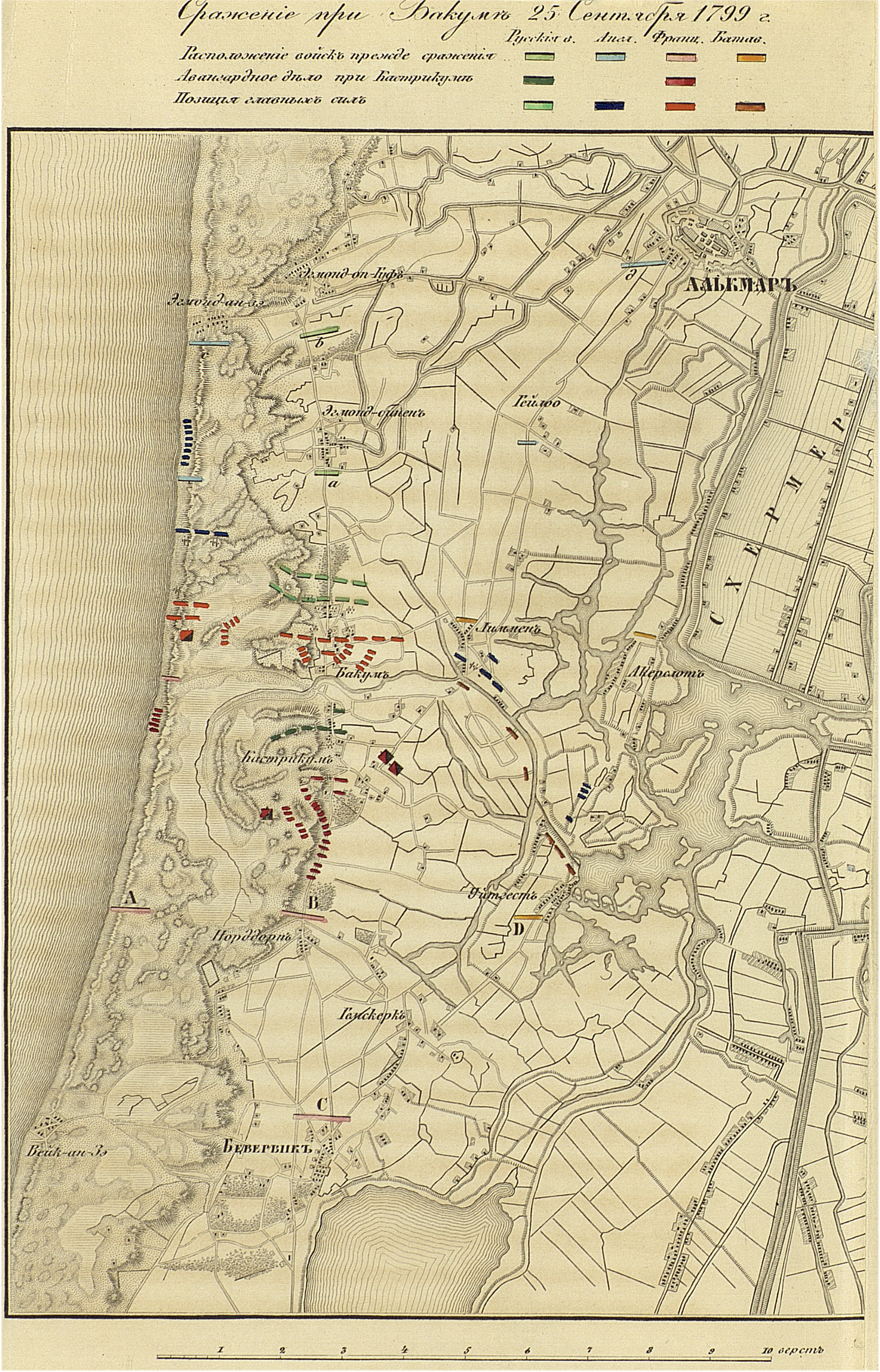
Battle map (in Russian) by Milyutin. Legend: from left to right, respectively, Russians, British, French, and Batavians; from top to bottom, respectively, the position before the battle, the vanguard action, and the position of the main forces.

=== Depictions of distinguished commanders ===
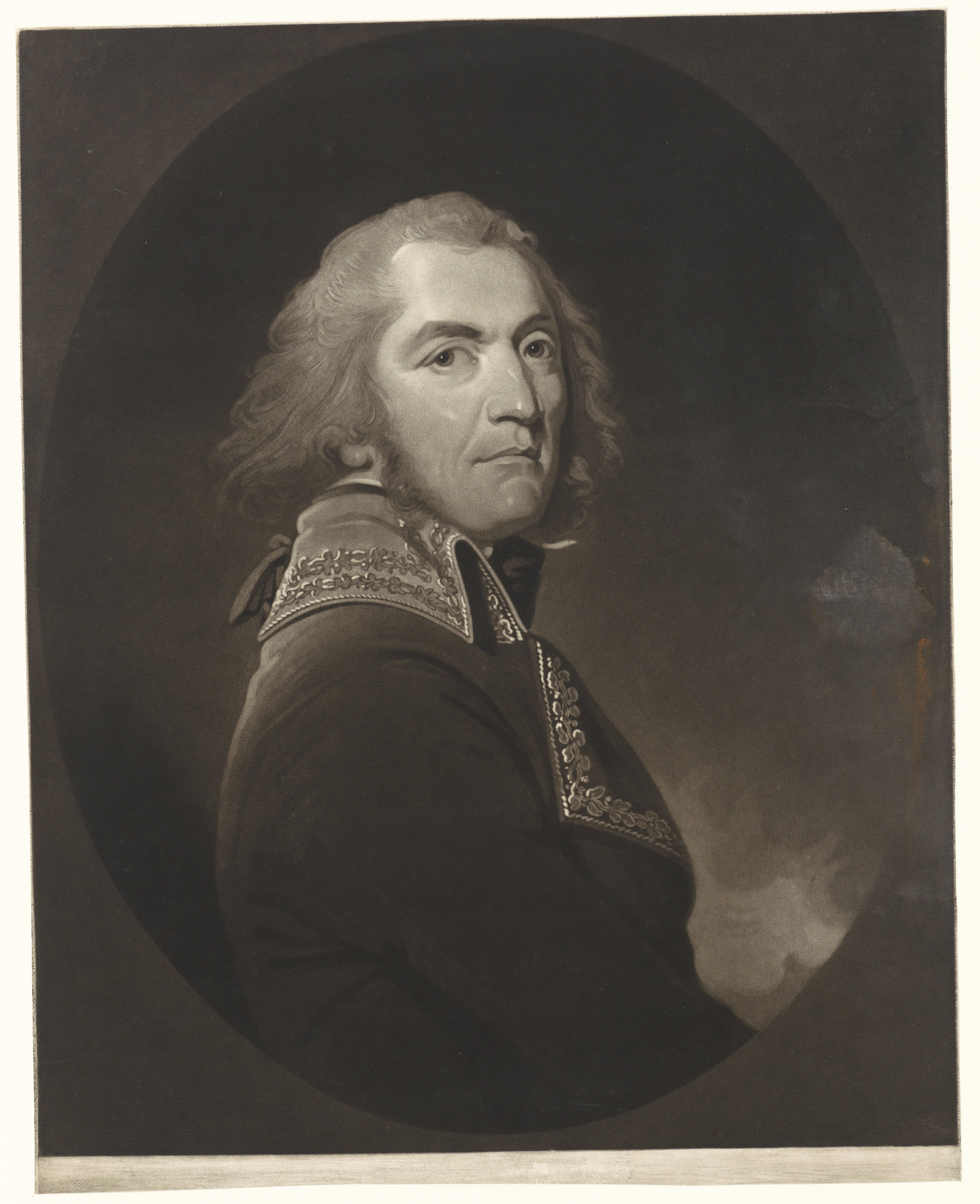
Guillaume Brune

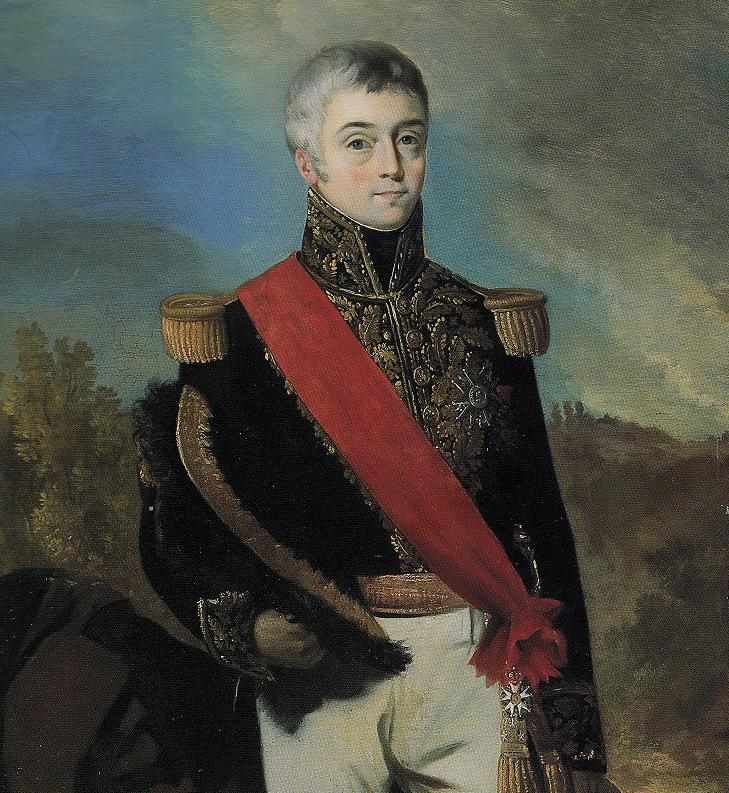
Louis Gouvion

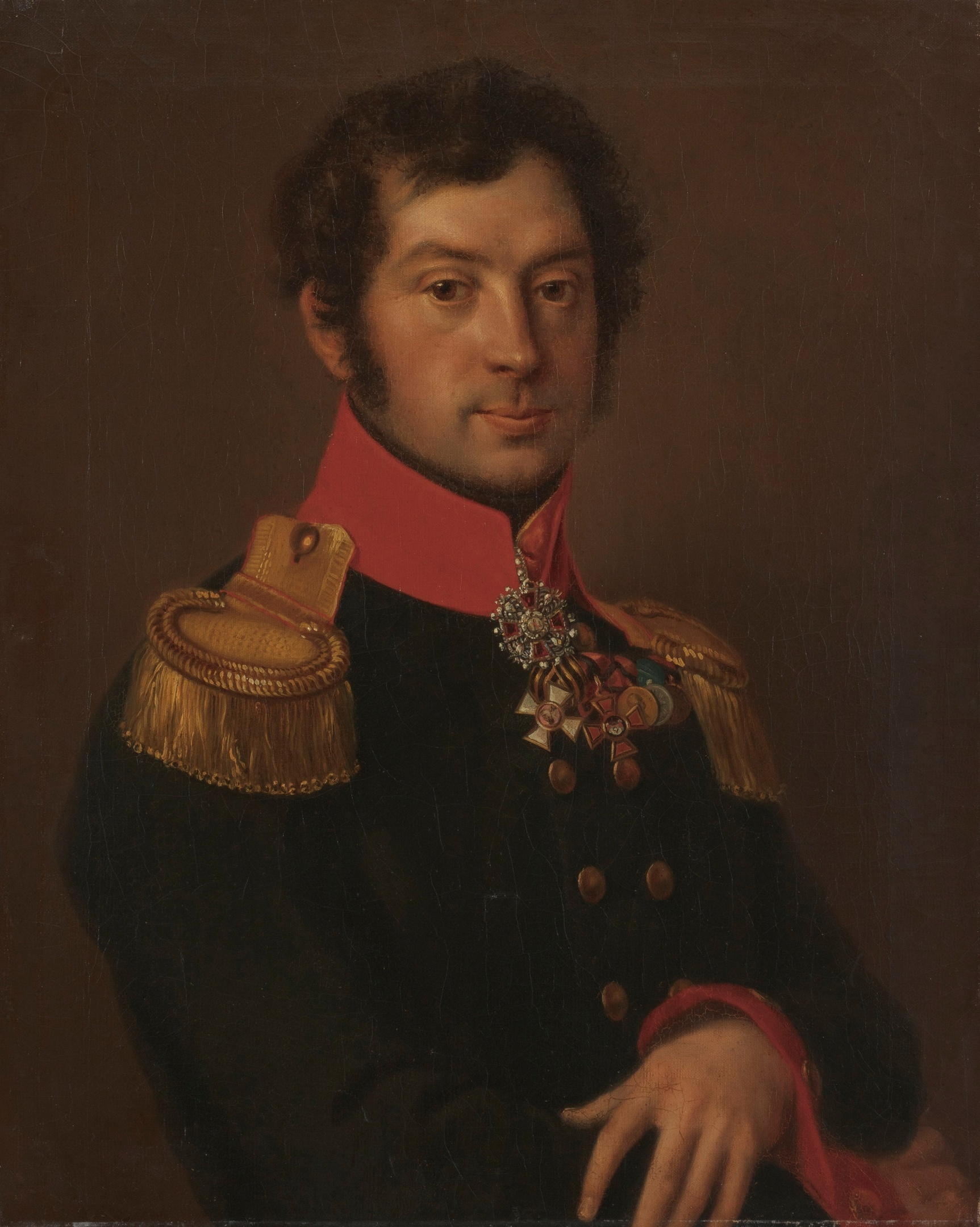
Alexander Dubiansky (Dubyansky)

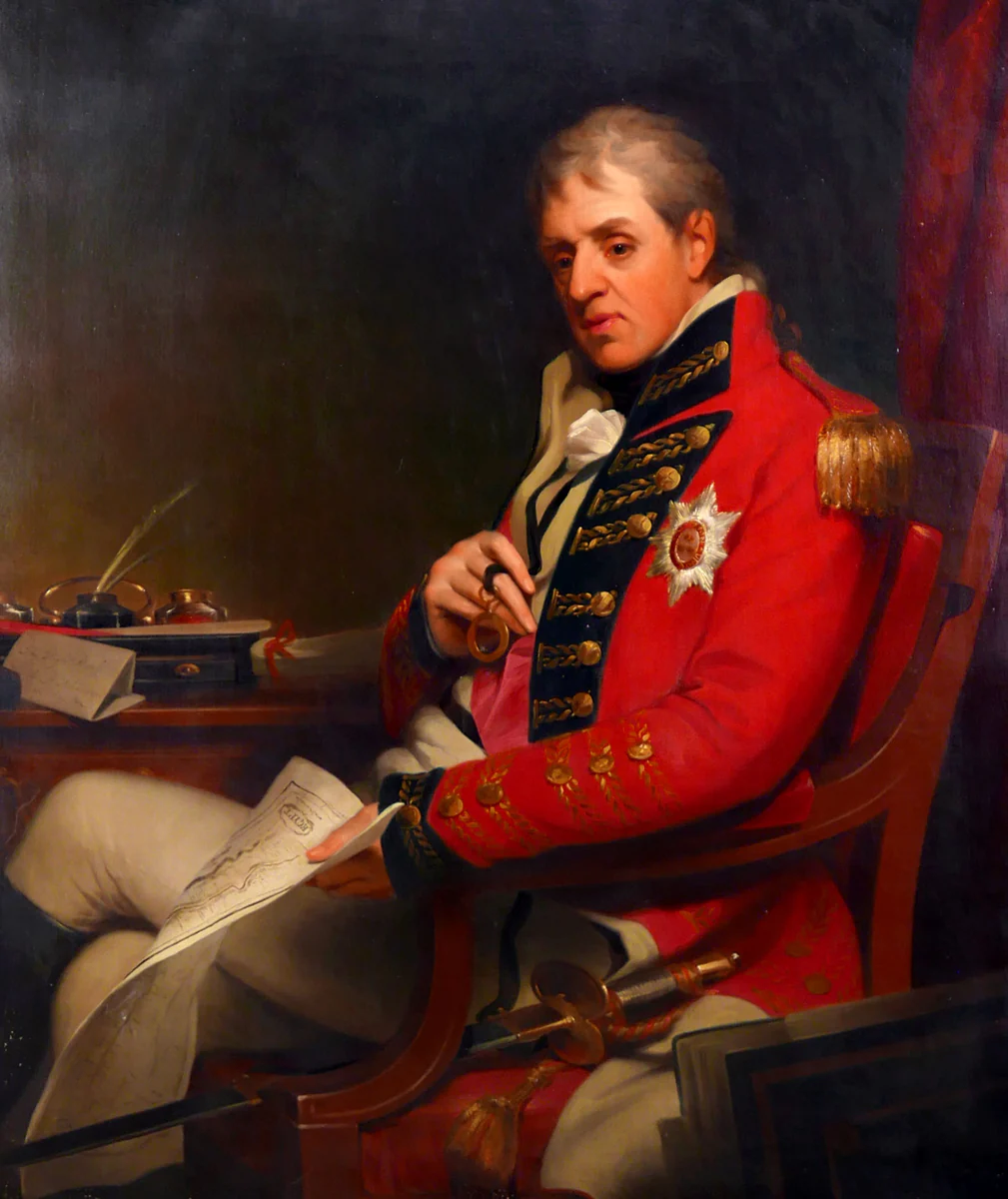
John Hely-Hutchinson

== Aftermath ==
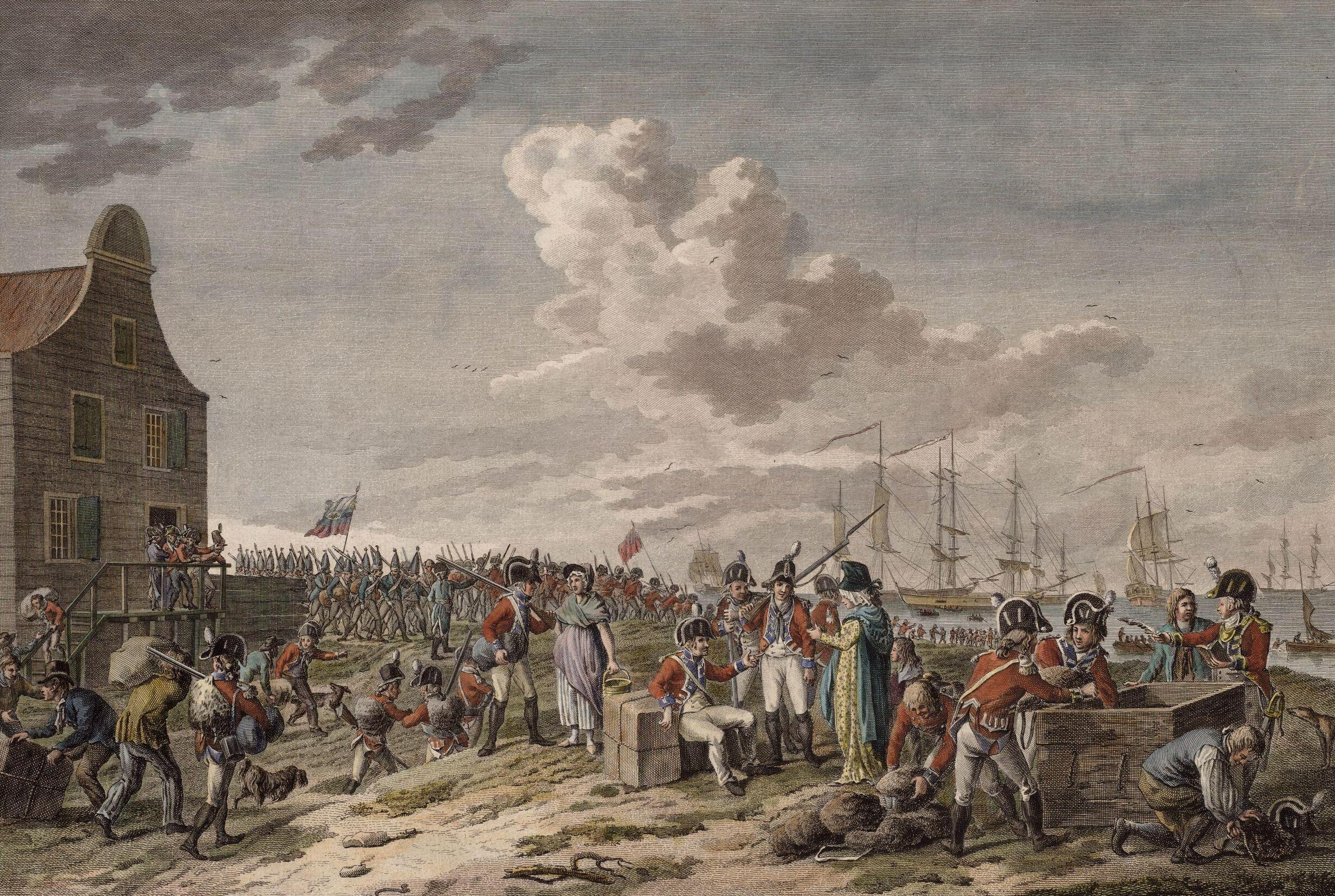
Engraving of the Anglo-Russian evacuation

Thus the fate of the invasion was decided. At Castricum, the Russo-British allies lost 2,536 men, or up to 2,557, including 1,400+ British (Note: Although the British approached the Russians in the midst of the battle, they were already engaged in combat with the Batavians on the opposite flank from the very beginning, and only the British fought with the French units, which were stationed in the dunes.) and 1,100+ Russians, and 11 guns (out of the 21,100 engaged), while the Batavian-French losses stood at 1,382 or 1,384 (out of the 19,000 engaged). The defeat persuaded the Duke that his position was untenable and that the only way was to leave the Netherlands altogether, as decided at the new council. After a chaotic retreat in rainy weather, during which a large number of sick and wounded, as well as women and children accompanying the British, were left in the hands of the enemy, the parties signed the Convention of Alkmaar on October 10. The French sent the sick and wounded to various Dutch fortresses, and returned the women and children to the allies at their outposts.

The British and Russians were allowed to withdraw from Holland, without paying reparations, and retaining captured bounty. As a sign of gratitude for enabling him honourably to emerge from the inglorious Dutch imbroglio, Brune received a number of horses from the Duke. By 19 November all the British and Russian troops had been embarked and the expedition was over. In the years following the 1799 invasion, defensive lines were constructed in Holland to protect Amsterdam from future invasions from the north.

== Commemoration ==
A townhouse in Castricum has a cannonball embedded in its wall with a plaque beneath commemorating the battle. Various locality names in Castricum also provide a reminder of the battle, like the Russenbergen dunes and the Doodelaan street. The Russisch Monument in Bergen marks the fighting there. The French victory was also commemorated on the Arc de Triomphe in Paris as "Alkmaer".

== Notes ==
Preceded by Battle of Alkmaar (1799)	French Revolution: Revolutionary campaigns Battle of Castricum	Succeeded by Battle of Genola
