= Battle of Alkmaar (1799) =

Battle of the Anglo-Russian invasion of Holland

- Part of the Anglo-Russian invasion of Holland
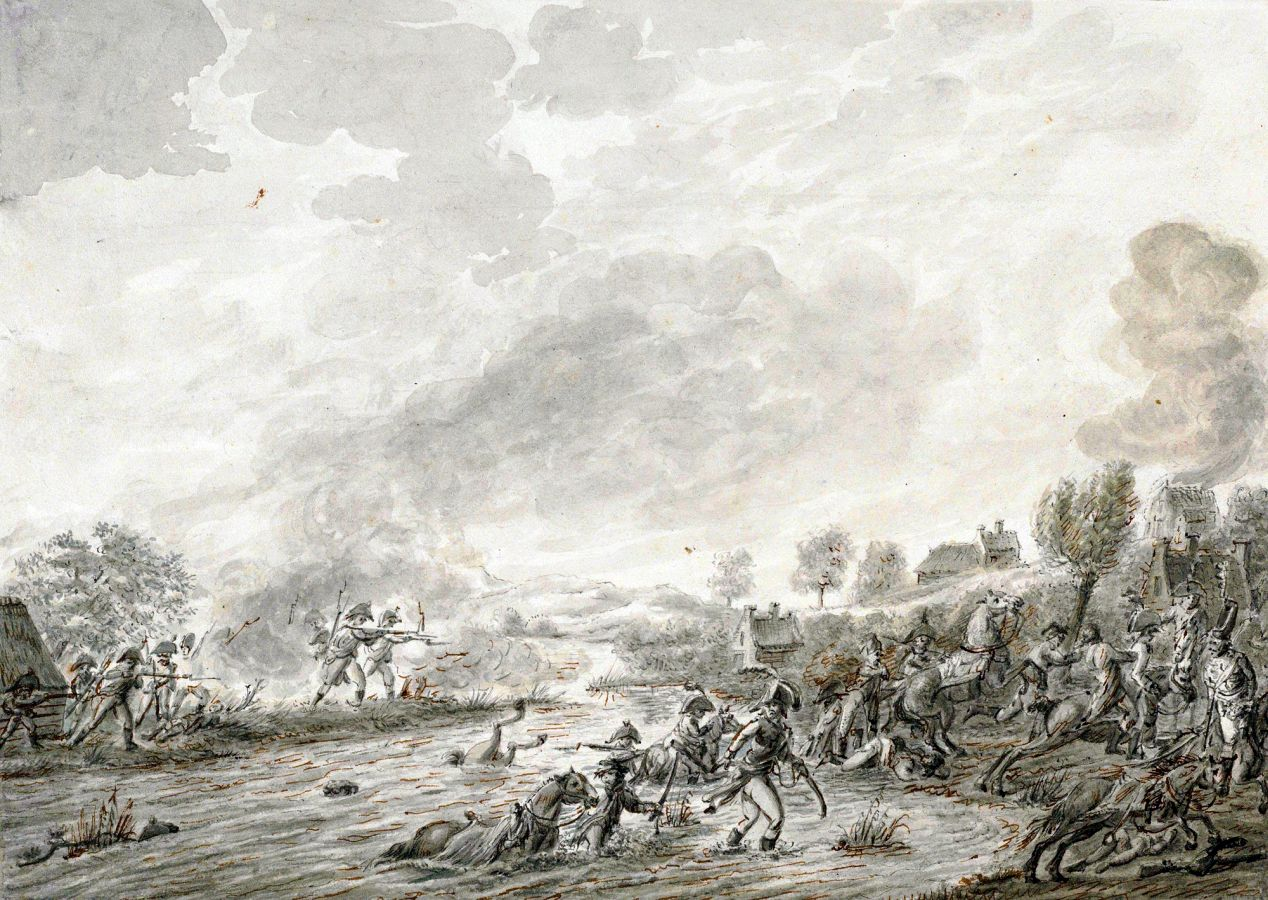
- Illustration of the battle
Date	2 October 1799
Location	Alkmaar, The Netherlands 52°38′04″N 4°44′47″E
Result	Anglo-Russian victory

Belligerents
France; Batavian Republic	Great Britain; Russian Empire

Commanders and leaders
(France) Guillaume Brune (Batavian Republic) Herman Daendels	(Kingdom of Great Britain) Frederick Augustus (Kingdom of Great Britain) Home Popham (Russian Empire) Ivan Essen

Strength
25,000 (22,000 engaged, inclusive of 12,000 French and 10,000 Batavians)	40,000 (30,000 engaged, inclusive of 21,700 British and 8,300 Russians); 7 gunboats (under Popham's disposal)

Casualties and losses
3,000 killed, wounded or captured 7 cannon	2,200 killed or wounded; • at least 1,500 British; • at least 500 Russians

The Battle of Alkmaar (also sometimes called the Second Battle of Bergen or the Battle of Egmond-aan-Zee) was fought on 2 October 1799 between forces of the French Republic and her ally, the Batavian Republic under the command of general Guillaume Marie Anne Brune, and an expeditionary force from Great Britain and her ally Russia, commanded by Prince Frederick, Duke of York and Albany in the vicinity of Alkmaar during the Anglo-Russian invasion of Holland. The battle ended in an Anglo-Russian victory, forcing Brune to order a strategic withdrawal the next day to a line between Monnickendam in the East and Castricum in the West. The Duke of York praised the actions of the Russian commanders in this battle, and also congratulated Emperor Paul on the victory. There the final battle of the campaign would take place on 6 October.

== Background ==
After the first Battle of Bergen (1799) of 19 September 1799 had left both armies in almost the same positions as they had held before that battle, a resumption of the Anglo-Russian offensive was for a while precluded by very bad weather. Torrential rains made the roads impassable. The defenders profited from this lull in the campaign by completing their inundations in the low-lying eastern part of the North-Holland peninsula. These soon made their defenses in that part of the country impregnable. As a consequence a repeat of the thrusts by Sir Ralph Abercromby toward Hoorn, and general Pulteney toward Oudkarspel along the Langedijk had become pointless. The Langedijk was now a narrow island in a big lake that could easily be defended by the 1st Batavian Division of General Herman Willem Daendels.

The delay had the advantage for the expeditionary force, however, that a final installment of Russian troops in the form of the division of General Emmé reinforced it with 6,000 men. With the British reinforcements that landed about the same time the total complement on the Anglo-Russian side came therewith to 40,000 men, an appreciable numerical superiority over their Franco-Batavian adversaries.

The Duke of York, aware that French reinforcements from Belgium were on the way, therefore decided to make use of this numerical superiority as soon as practicable. His plan was to concentrate his attack entirely on the Franco-Batavian left wing, consisting of the 2nd Batavian division near Koedijk (which was still commanded by General Henri Damas Bonhomme, as General Jean-Baptiste Dumonceau was recuperating from the wound sustained during the Battle of Bergen) and the French division of General Dominique Vandamme between Alkmaar and the sea, around the village of Bergen. The attack was to be made on 30 September, but it turned out that the roads were still very bad: the soldiers sank to their knees into the mud. The attack was then advanced to 1 October (Emperor Paul I of Russia's birthday), but again had to be postponed, now to 2 October.

== Battle ==
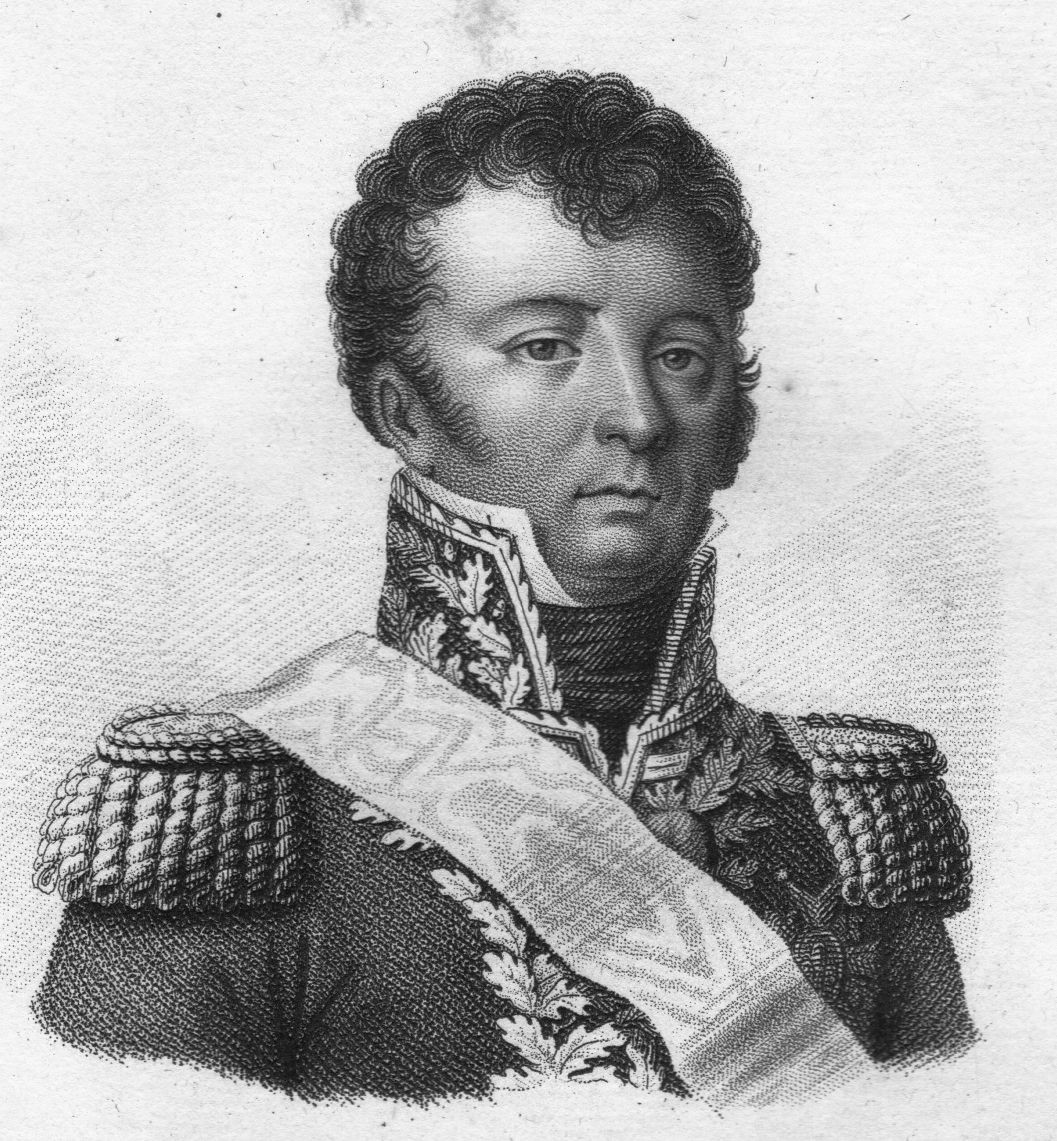
Général Dominique Joseph René Vandamme

The Anglo-Russian dispositions were as follows:

- on the right wing, advancing along the beach and sea dike near Petten with as objective the village of Egmond aan Zee, was a column of about 8,000 infantry under Abercromby. It consisted of the 1st Brigade of Guards, and the 4th and 6th brigades, augmented with 800 cavalry (11th and 15th Light Dragoons and horse and foot artillery);
- in the center two columns of about 8,000 Russian infantry and 600 cavalry (hussars and lancers) under the command of General Ivan Essen (who had succeeded the captured Ivan Ivanovich Hermann), one advancing along the subsidiary sea dike to Bergen, the other (under General Sedmoratsky/Sedmoratzky) moving parallel;
- on the left a column of about 6,000 British troops under Sir David Dundas, consisting of the 2nd (Burrard), 3rd (Coote) and 7th (Lord Chatham) infantry brigades, augmented with two troops of the 11th Light Dragoons and some Royal Artillery. Coote and Chatham were to support the Russians in their attack on Bergen and to maintain contact with Abercromby. The Foot Guards under Burrard were to attack the Batavians near Schoorldam along the Alkmaar canal, supported in this effort by a flotilla of seven gunboats, commanded by Sir Home Popham;
- finally, on the extreme left a column of about 7,000 British and Russian infantry and 250 cavalry under Sir James Pulteney. This column was to screen the exposed left flank of the army from an attack by Daendels' depleted division, to support the other columns and to exploit any opportunity that might present itself to turn the flank of the Franco-Batavian troops.

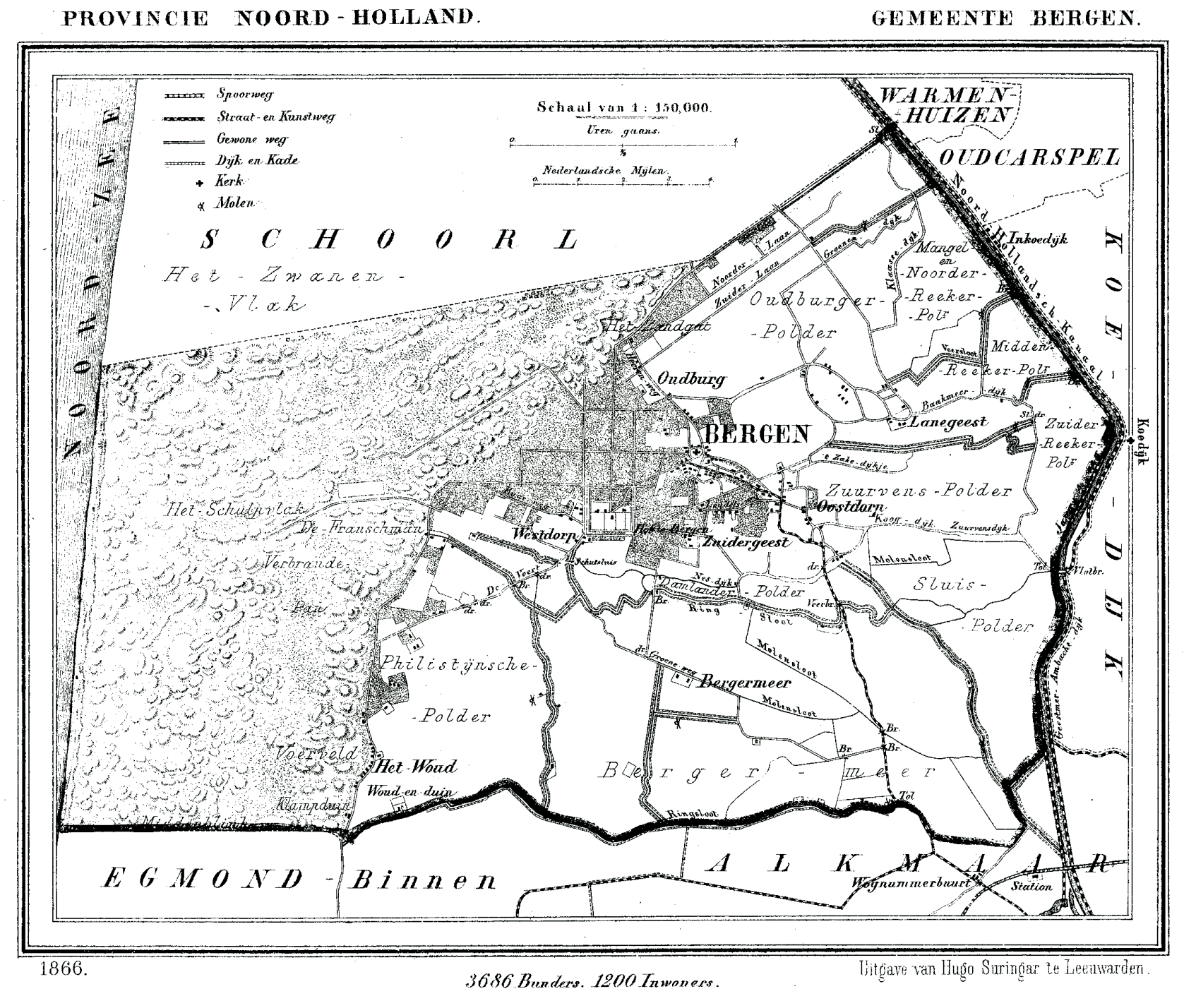
Map of the battlefield near Bergen

These dispositions make clear that the main thrust of the attack again was towards the village of Bergen. Other than the first battle of Bergen this time the attack would be concentrated on a much narrower front, between Schoorl and the North Sea. As Abercromby was supposed to advance along the beach to a point beyond the left flank of the French, the plan of attack may be characterized as one of "single envelopment."

The first stages of the battle went according to the British plan. To allow all columns to advance at the same time the start time had to be delayed till low tide (6.30 AM that day) to allow general Abercromby's column to make use of the beach. Soon Coote and Chatham drove the French outposts from the villages of Camp and Groet, and cleared the dunes (which start to widen appreciably at this point). Essen's central column then advanced cautiously. Meanwhile, Burrard, Sedmoratzky, and Popham's gunboats drove the French and Batavian troops out of the villages of Schoorl and Schoorldam toward Koedijk. Here the Russians halted and limited themselves to shelling Koedijk and Bergen with their artillery for the remainder of the day.

Meanwhile, the French left wing had fallen back on the village of Bergen. This was a strong position and York realized they had to be removed from it to secure success. He therefore ordered Chatham to bring up his brigade from the plain and support Coote's brigade in a combined attack on the French in the dunes. They managed to push the French back and forced them to give up their position in the heights near Bergen. All now seemed ready for an attack on that village, but Essen seemed to be very reluctant to press that attack and, as the two British brigades lacked the strength to go it alone, the allied attack stalled there.

The French noted the Russian hesitation and at this time launched a fierce counterattack from Bergen in two columns under generals Gouvion and Boudet. These attacks were successfully countered by the British Reserve in cooperation with Coote's brigade. The French were driven from the dunes after a spirited fight (during which the British 27th Foot distinguished itself), but remained in possession of Bergen. Dundas' column remained in fire contact until 11 PM, but did not advance further that day.

While this was going on, Abercromby's column had been steadily, if slowly, advancing along the beach. The incoming tide made the beach narrower all the time and forced the infantry to march through loose sand, while the cavalry on the right flank was forced to wade through the surf. After some time, the French discovered the advance and brought up sharpshooters who started to exact a steady toll, especially among the British officers. Abercromby detached more and more troops to drive them off, but the French also brought up reinforcements that eventually blocked the advance by taking up a strong position on the dunes overlooking the beach. General Moore with the 4th Brigade tried to drive them off with a bayonet attack, but the French line held. The engagement continued for several hours and was fought on both sides with great tenacity. Abercromby had two horses killed under him and Moore was severely wounded. Finally, the British troops managed to penetrate the French defense and occupy the road between Bergen and Egmond aan Zee, cutting off the French extreme left wing at the latter village.

This prompted Brune, still at Bergen, to order Vandamme to take personal command at this danger point, while Daendels was ordered to send Batavian cavalry and infantry from his position on the extreme right wing by way of Alkmaar to reinforce the French on the left wing. Vandamme, on arrival at Egmond aan Zee, noticed that Abercromby's horse artillery had advanced too far along the beach and thought he had a chance to turn the tide in the battle by leading a cavalry charge on those guns. However, he had not reckoned with Lord Paget's dragoons, which managed to ambush him just when he had captured the British guns. Paget routed the French cavalry, who retreated all the way to Egmond aan Zee. Ad darkness now fell, this last action in effect ended the battle. Abercromby, aware that he had advanced beyond the position of Bergen, decided to spend the night at the beach. Both his men and their horses were tortured with thirst, because fresh water was very scarce in the dunes. They slept on their arms that night, being harassed by intermittent French artillery fire.

Brune, though not directly threatened by Abercromby, was aware that the latter had technically turned the French left flank and cut off the communications between Bergen and Egmond aan Zee. He therefore decided to give up his position in Bergen and commence a strategic retreat all the way to the line Wijk aan Zee over Castricum to Uitgeest the next day. Alkmaar, abandoned by the French and Batavian troops opened its gates to the British and prudently hoisted the orange flag of the former stadtholder.

== Aftermath ==
The Anglo-Russian losses in this battle were 2,200 killed and wounded among whom many officers, nine of field rank. The losses on the side of the Franco-Batavian forces are estimated at 3,000 in all. A number of British regiments were given the right to bear the honorary distinction "Egmont op Zee" (as the British render the name of the village) on their colors and guidons.

For a few days the British were riding high, apparently having gained control of the greater part of the North-Holland peninsula, including its major cities. However, large parts of that area, including the rich farmland of the Schermer, Beemster, and Purmer polders had been flooded by the Batavian army. The Anglo-Russians were therefore denied provisions from those areas and still had to be supplied by sea. The advance had also appreciably lengthened the supply lines from their base at Den Helder. The appalling state of the roads, due to the bad weather made supply increasingly difficult. The Duke of York was therefore forced to press his offensive toward Haarlem, the more so as the French received reinforcements from Belgium. At the same time, an increasing number of sick depleted the Anglo-Russian ranks. The Duke therefore started an armed reconnaissance in force on 6 October, which through Russian impetuosity degenerated into the Battle of Castricum. The Anglo-Russian army lost the battle and the worsening strategic situation forced the Duke of York to make a strategic withdrawal, which drove the combined military force all the way back to his original bridgehead at the Zijpe polder. After agreeing to an honorable capitulation in the form of the Convention of Alkmaar the expeditionary forces evacuated the peninsula by 19 November 1799.

== Sources ==
- The campaign in Holland, 1799, by a subaltern (1861) W. Mitchell
- (in French) Jomini, A.H. (1822) Histoire Critique Et Militaire Des Guerres de la Revolution: Nouvelle Edition, Redigee Sur de Nouveaux Documens, Et Augmentee D'un Grand Nombre de Cartes Et de Plans (tome xv, ch. xciii)
- Jones, Colin (2014). The Longman Companion to the French Revolution. Taylor & Francis. ISBN 9781317870807.
- (in Dutch) Krayenhoff, C.R.T. (1832) Geschiedkundige Beschouwing van den Oorlog op het grondgebied der Bataafsche Republiek in 1799. J.C. Vieweg
- (in Russian) Milyutin, D.A. (1853) История войны России с Францией в царствование Императора Павла I в 1799 году [The history of Russia's war with France during the reign of Emperor Paul I in 1799]. Vol. 5. St. Petersburg: Типография штаба военно-учебных заведений.
- Flash-map of the Battle of Alkmaar. 2 October 1799. D. Milyutin. History of the War of 1799. SPb, 1857
- Nester, William (2023). The Coalitions Against Napoleon How British Money, Manufacturing and Military Power Forged the Alliances that Achieved Victory. Pen and Sword. ISBN 9781399043069.
- Smith, Digby (1998), “The Greenhill Napoleonic Wars Data Book: Actions and Losses in Personnel, Standards and Artillery, 1792–1815”. Greenhill Books, London, and Stackpole Books, Mechanicsburg, PA. ISBN 1-85367-276-9
- van Uythoven, Geert (2018). The Secret Expedition: The Anglo-Russian Invasion of Holland 1799. From reason to revolution 1721–1815. Vol. 19. Warwick: Helion and Company.

Preceded by Battle of Muottental	French Revolution: Revolutionary campaigns Battle of Alkmaar	Succeeded by Battle of Castricum
