= Convention of Alkmaar =

1799 agreement between Britain, Russia, France, and the Netherlands

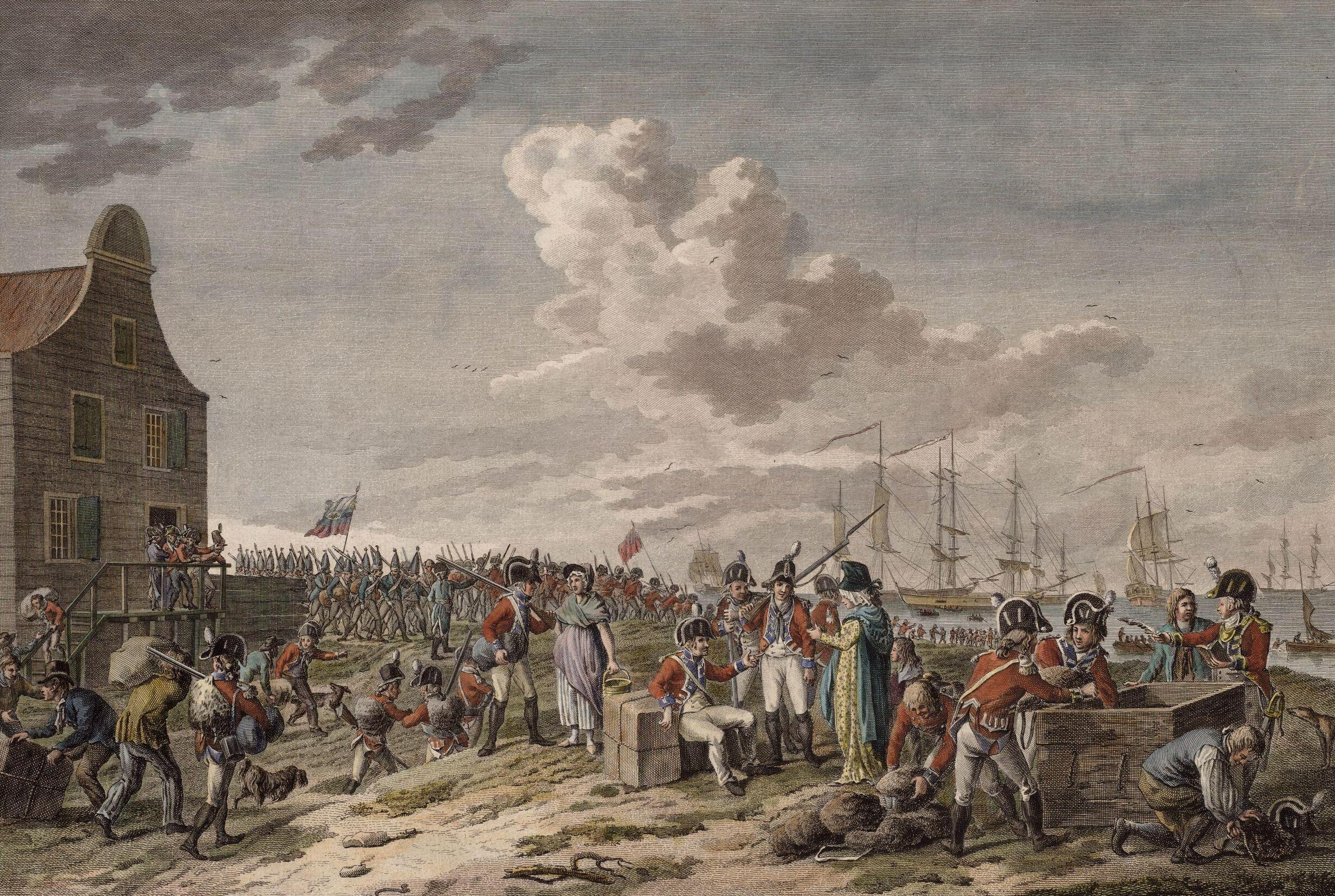
Engraving of the Anglo-Russian evacuation following the convention

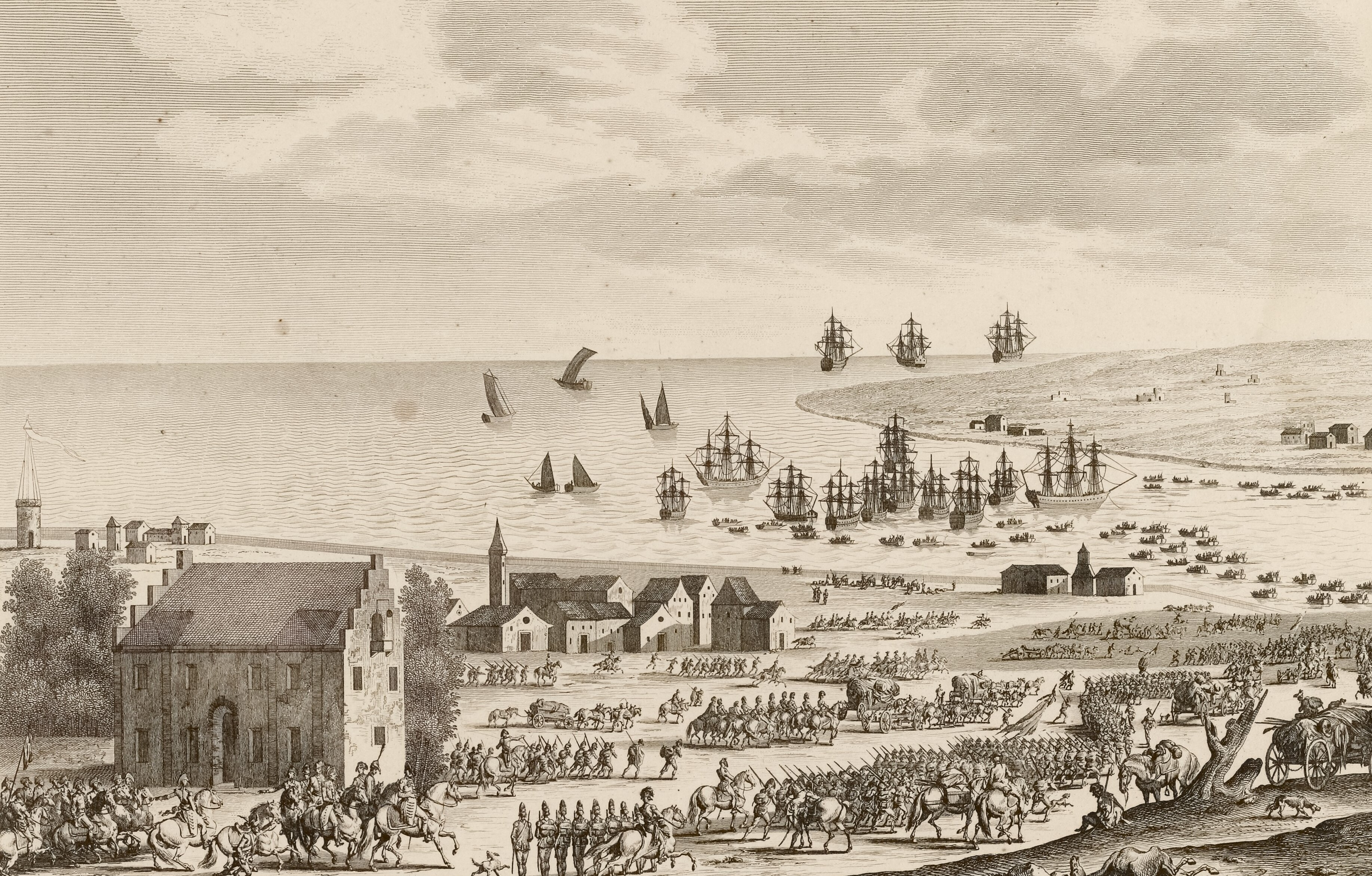
British and Russian troops evacuating on 1 November 1799

The Convention of Alkmaar was a 18 October 1799 agreement concluded between the commanders of the expeditionary forces of Great Britain and Russia on the one hand, and of those of the First French Republic and the Batavian Republic on the other, in the Dutch city of Alkmaar, by which the British and Russians agreed to withdraw their forces from the Batavian Republic following the failed Anglo-Russian invasion of Holland. The Russian and British forces under the Duke of York were transported back to Britain in the weeks after the Convention was signed.

== Text ==
Articles agreed upon by Major-General Knox, duly authorised by His Royal Highness the Duke of York, Commander-in-Chief of the combined English and Russian Army, and Citizen Rostollan, General of Brigade, and Atjutant-General, duly authorised by Citizen Brune, General and Commander-in-Chief of the French and Batavian Army.

Article I. From the date of this Convention all hostilities shall cease between the two armies.

Article II. The line of demarcation between the said armies shall be the line of their respective outposts as they now exist.

Article III. The continuation of all works, offensive and defensive, shall be suspended on both sides, and no new ones shall be undertaken.

Article IV. The batteries taken possession of at the Helder, or at other positions within the line, now occupied by the combined English and Russian army, shall be restored in the state in which they were taken, or (in the case of improvement) in their present state, and all the Dutch artillery therein shall be preserved.

Article V. The combined English and Russian army shall embark as soon as possible, and shall evacuate the territory, coasts, islands and inland waters of the Dutch Republic by 30 November 1799, without committing any injury by inundations, cutting the dykes, or otherwise interfering with the means of navigation.

Article VI. Any ships-of-war, or other vessels, which may arrive with reinforcements for the combined English and Russian army, shall not land the same, and shall be sent away as soon as possible.

Article VII. General Brune shall be at liberty to send an officer within the lines of the Zuype [sic], and to the Helder, to report to him the state of the batteries and the progress of the embarkation. His Royal Highness the Duke of York shall be equally at liberty to send an officer within the French and Batavian lines, to satisfy himself that no new works are carried on on their side. An officer of rank and distinction shall be sent from each army respectively to guarantee the execution of this convention.

Article VIII. Eight thousand prisoners of war, French and Batavians, taken before the present campaign, and now detained in England, shall be restored without conditions to their respective countries. The proportion and the choice of such prisoners for each to be determined between the two Republics. Major-General Knox shall remain with the French army to guarantee the execution of this article.

Article IX. The cartel agreed upon between the two armies for the exchange of the prisoners taken during the present campaign, shall continue in full force till it shall be carried into complete execution; and it is further agreed that the Dutch admiral de Winter shall be considered as exchanged.

Concluded at Alkmaar, 18 October 1799, by the undersigned General officers, furnished with full powers to this effect.

(Signed) J. Knox, Major-General

(Signed) Rostollan

== Sources ==
- Harvey, Robert. War of Wars: The Epic Struggle Between Britain and France 1789–1815. London, 2007
- Intelligence Division, War Office, Great Britain, British minor expeditions: 1746 to 1814. HMSO, 1884
- (in Dutch) Krayenhoff, C.R.T. (1832) Geschiedkundige Beschouwing van den Oorlog op het grondgebied der Bataafsche Republiek in 1799. J.C. Vieweg
- Urban, Mark. Generals: Ten British Commanders Who Shaped the World. Faber and Faber, 2005.
