= Scharwoude =

Scharwoude is the name of several places in the Netherlands, all in the province of North Holland:

- Scharwoude, Langedijk, a former municipality
- Noord-Scharwoude and Zuid-Scharwoude, towns in the municipality Langedijk
- Scharwoude (Koggenland), a small village and former municipality
