= Battle of Bergen (1799) =

Battle of the Anglo-Russian invasion of Holland

- Part of the Anglo-Russian invasion of Holland
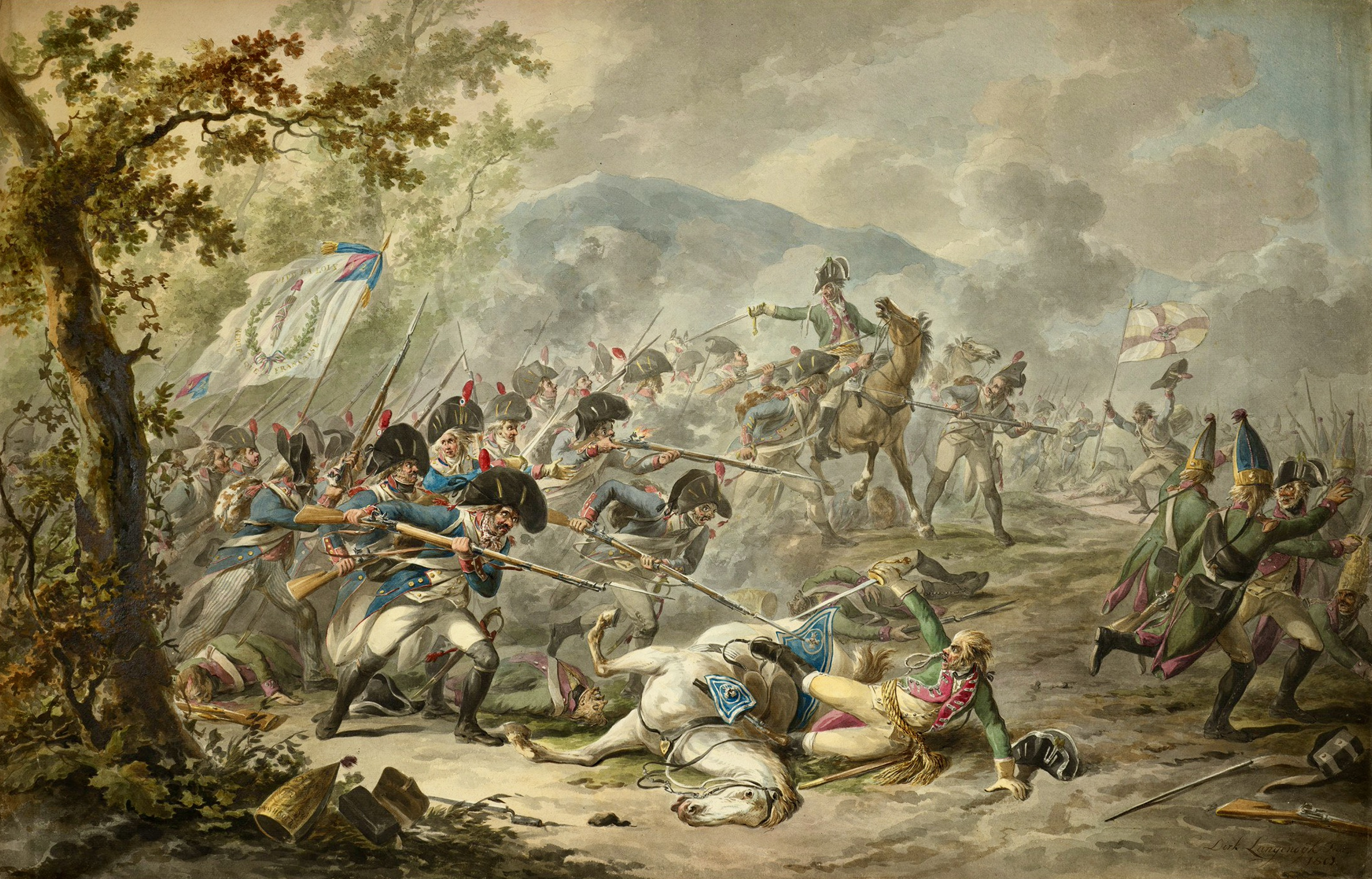
- Johann Hermann von Fersen being captured by French troops during the battle
Date	19 September 1799
Location	Bergen, Batavian Republic 52.6700°N 4.7000°E
Result	Franco-Batavian victory

Belligerents
France; Batavian Republic	Great Britain; Russia

Commanders and leaders
Guillaume Brune; Herman Willem Daendels	Prince Frederick; Johann Hermann von Fersen (POW)

Strength
22,000 (10,000 French and 12,000 Batavians)	47,000 (c. 23,300 engaged, inclusive of 13,200 British and 10,100 Russians)

Casualties and losses
836: 815 killed or wounded, 21 captured; 2,591: 1,539 killed or wounded, 1,052 captured; Total: 3,427 More info: § Losses	1,017: 117 killed, 410 wounded, 490 captured; 3,010: 1,785 killed or captured, 1,225 wounded; Total: 4,027 (Note: There is an approximate estimate of 4,000+ casualties, inclusive of 3,075 Russians, with up to 1,800 killed and missing and 1,275 wounded among them, as well as 925+ British.) More info: § Losses

The Battle of Bergen (Note: a.k.a. First Battle of Bergen. The Battle of Alkmaar (1799) is alternatively called the Second Battle of Bergen.) was fought on 19 September 1799 and resulted in a Franco-Batavian victory, as Generals Guillaume Brune and Herman Willem Daendels (Brune commanded both his own French and Daendels' Batavians) defeated the Anglo-Russian forces that had landed in North Holland under the Duke of York as supreme commander and Lieutenant General Johann Hermann von Fersen. Due to a lack of cooperation between the British and Russians they were both defeated in detail, with von Fersen being captured by French troops. The battlefield is marked by a monument erected in 1902.

== Order of battle ==
The Duke of York landed on 15 September, and assumed the command of the army, which now amounted to about 30,000 men with 1,200 light cavalry. On 19 September the forces, under the Duke of York, formed in four columns, moved forward from Schagerbrug.

At this period the Allies possessed a superiority of force with which it was decided to strike a decisive blow as early as possible. The Dutch, numbering 12,000, were in a strong position around Langedijk, somewhat in advance of the French, who, by drawing in all detachments, had raised their field strength to 10,000 men, who were positioned in Alkmaar, Bergen, Schoorl, and Egmond aan Zee.

=== Anglo-Russian forces ===
Prince Frederick, Duke of York and Albany

Left Column – LTG Sir Ralph Abercromby
Division	Brigade	Regiments and Others
	4th Brigade MG Sir John Moore	2/1st Foot; 25th Foot; 49th Foot; 79th Foot; 92nd Foot
	6th Brigade MG the Earl of Cavan	1/20th Foot; 2/20th Foot; 63rd Foot
	7th Brigade MG the Earl of Chatham	4th Foot; 31st Foot
	Reserve Col. MacDonald	53rd Foot; 55th Foot; Provisional Grenadier Battalion; Provisional Light Infantry Battalion
	Cavalry	18th Light Dragoons (2 squadrons)

Right Column – Johann Hermann von Fersen
Division	Brigade	Regiments and Others
1st Division; LTG Mikhail Zherebtsov (Jerepsoff)	1st Brigade Col. Count Fersen	Zherebtsov Musketeer Regiment (1 battalion); Fersen Musketeer Regiment (2 battalions)
1st Division; LTG Mikhail Zherebtsov (Jerepsoff)	2nd Brigade Col. Dubiansky	Combined Grenadiers (3 battalions)
2nd Division; LTG Ivan Essen	1st Brigade MG Alexander Sedmoratsky	Sedmoratsky Musketeer Regiment (2 battalions); Combined Grenadiers (1 battalion)
2nd Division; LTG Ivan Essen	2nd Brigade Col. Arbenev (d'Arbénief)	Arbenev Musketeer Regiment (2 battalions); Combined Grenadiers (1 battalion)
3rd Division; MG Ivan Emme		Emme Infantry Regiment (2 battalions); Combined Grenadiers (2 battalions)
	9th Brigade MG Robert Manners	1/9th Foot; 2/9th Foot; 56th Foot
	Advance Guard Gen. Southoff (Sutgov)	St. Petersburg Grenadier Regiment (1 battalion)
	Artillery	Kaptzevitch Artillery Regiment
	Cavalry	Gladki & Shladoff Hussar Regiments (4 squadrons); Don & Ural Cossacks (6 squadrons)
	Unbrigaded	7th Light Dragoons (2 squadrons)

Left-Centre Column – LTG Sir James Pulteney
Division	Brigade	Regiments and Others
	3rd Brigade MG Sir Eyre Coote	2/27th Foot; 29th Foot; 85th Foot
	5th Brigade MG George Don	1/17th Foot; 2/17th Foot; 1/40th Foot; 2/40th Foot
	Cavalry	11th Light Dragoons (2 squadrons)

Right-Centre Column – LTG David Dundas
Division	Brigade	Regiments and Others
	1st Guards Brigade MG Francis D'Oyly	3/1st Foot Guards; Provisional Grenadier Guards Battalion
	2nd Guards Brigade MG Harry Burrard	1/Coldstream Guards; 1/3rd Foot Guards
	8th Brigade MG H.R.H. Prince William	1/5th Foot; 2/5th Foot; 2/35th Foot
	Cavalry	11th Light Dragoons (2 squadrons)

== Battle plan and terrain ==
The British and Russian commanders noticed that the Republicans had left their right uncovered, and a very strong position unoccupied. This would have been difficult to correct if the attack on that flank had been vigorously carried out. They had also left Amsterdam undefended on the only side by which it was accessible.

The plan of operations was as follows: The left column was to turn the opponent's right, on the Zuiderzee; the right was to drive the opponent from the heights of Camperduin, and to seize Bergen; the right-centre had to force the position at Warmenhuizen and Schoorldam, and to cooperate with the right column; while the left-centre had to obtain possession of Oudkarspel, on the main road leading to Alkmaar.

The opponent's left was advantageously posted on the high sand hills which extend from the sea, in front of Petten, to the town of Bergen. The ground over which the centre columns had to move was intersected every three or four hundred yards by broad, deep, wet ditches and canals. The bridges across the few roads leading to the points of attack were destroyed, and obstacles had been carefully arranged.

== Battle ==
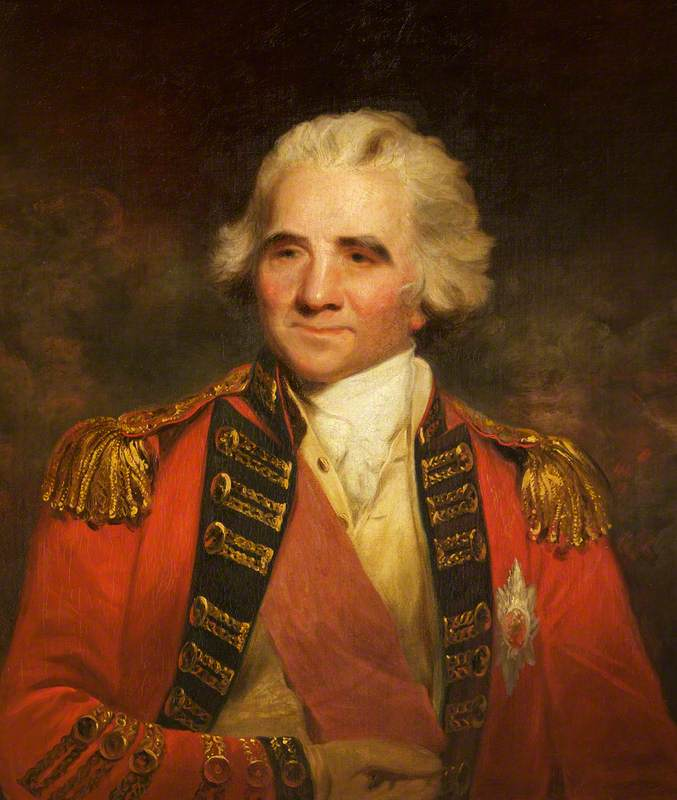
1798 portrait of Sir Ralph Abercromby by John Hoppner

Contrary to all reasonable expectations, the force under Sir Ralph Abercromby took no direct part in this action; consequently the allied troops engaged amounted to no more than between 15,000 and 18,000 men. The corps under Sir Ralph Abercromby began their march on the evening of 18 September, but his advance was delayed by the bad state of the roads, and he arrived at Hoorn many hours later than was expected. The objectives that would have been gained by this column would have had a material effect on the result of the whole expedition, and could only be attempted while the Duke of York possessed the superior force.

The battle was commenced by Russian forces, which had by 8 am, September 19, obtained possession of Bergen despite strong French opposition. In vain did they expect support from their British allies, which had not even lined up for the battle, because the British and Russian commanders had neglected to synchronize their clocks. As a result, Russian forces were rapidly encircled by the French, Hermann was made prisoner and his second-in-command Jerepsoff killed, while their troops were forced back through Bergen to Schoorl, which they also had to abandon. General I. Essen took over command of the Russians. The French stated the outcome could have been against them if the British had intervened in time. The Duke of York would write to Emperor Paul I after the battle of Castricum, pointing to the Russian "excessive" rapidity:

I cannot praise enough the exploits of the Russian troops, although their ardor unexpectedly drew them into a pitched battle against forces far superior, and therefore could not be supported in time.

This village (Schoorl) was retaken by Major-General Manners' Brigade, which was then reinforced by two battalions of Russians, by Major-General D'Oyley's Brigade of Guards, and by the 35th Regiment, under Prince William. The action was renewed by these troops, who in their turn repulsed the opponent; but a lack of ammunition and the exhausted state of the corps engaged in that part of the field obliged them to retire on Petten and the Zijpe Canal.

The column under Lieutenant-General Dundas attacked the village of Warmenhuizen at dawn, where the opponent, with a large force of artillery, was strongly positioned. Three battalions of Russians, under Major-General Sedmoratsky, moving from Krabbendam, bravely stormed the left of the village, with the 1st Regiment of Guards entering it on the right at the same time. The Grenadier battalion of Guards, the 3rd Regiment of Guards and the 2nd battalion 5th Regiment which had been previously detached to march upon Schoorldam to keep up the communication with Sir James Pulteney, were joined by the remainder of the column, which, after taking Warmenhuizen, had been reinforced by the 1st battalion 5th Regiment, and the whole moved forward and seized the village. They held it under artillery fire until the conclusion of the action.

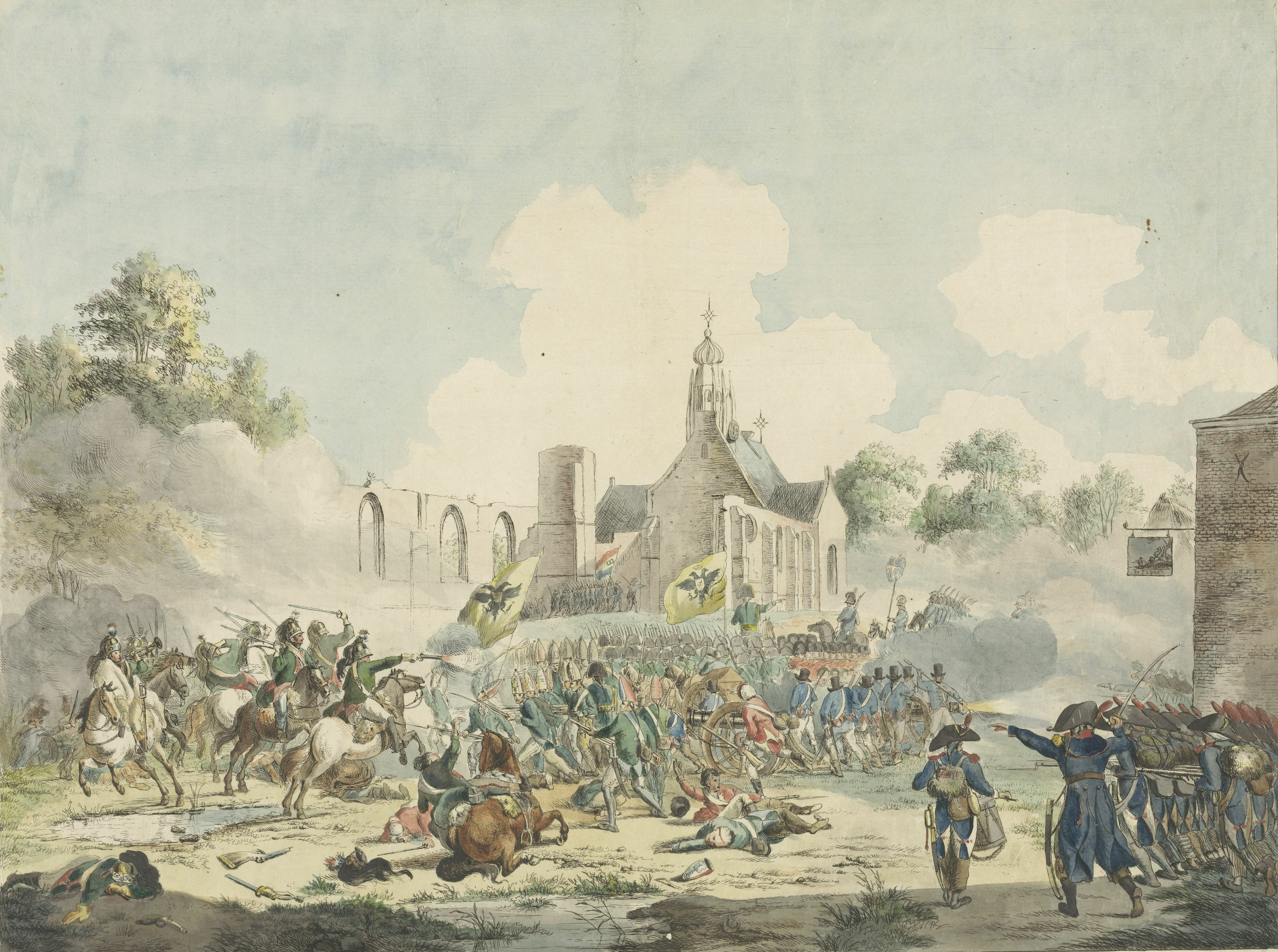
1799 illustration of the battle

The left-centre column, though opposed by the bulk of the Batavian army, under General Daendels, had overcome all opposition and taken possession of the village of Oudkarspel, thus securing the direct line of advance on Alkmaar. However, this did not come easy for the column, as described further. Pulteney, using Don's brigade, attacked Oudkarspel along the Langedijk dam, but encountered stubborn Batavian resistance in the village, protected by several lunettes. After several unsuccessful attacks, the British were forced to take cover behind the dam to protect themselves from gunfire. Soon, however, the Batavians attempted an unsuccessful counterattack against the very same British entrenched behind the dam. The British themselves emerged from the dam to meet them, repelled the Batavians, and captured the village. Daendels barely managed to withdraw his troops to Sint Pancras. Coote overran the Batavian outpost from Nieudorp and joined forces with Don. Some of the Batavian troops were surrounded by Coote's and Don's brigades and laid down their arms. Sir Ralph Abercromby had equally well accomplished his task by capturing the town of Hoorn, on the coast of the Zuiderzee, and placing himself in a favourable position for completing the turning movement. However, in consequence of the partial failure on the right, it was considered necessary to recall all the troops and re-occupy the former position.

The strength of the column which attacked Bergen would have been more than sufficient if it had been employed correctly. This column was numerically superior to the opponent, but it moved in mass in an intersected country, did not cover its flanks, and its operations having, contrary to order, been commenced long before daylight, its fire was probably more destructive to itself than to the opponent. That the other columns were not too weak for their tasks is shown by their having taken and held, until recalled, the points against which they had been directed.

== Losses ==
The losses on both sides were considerable:

British: 6 officers, 2 sergeants, 109 rank-and-file killed; 43 officers, 20 sergeants, 2 drummers, 345 rank-and-file, wounded; 22 sergeants, 5 drummers, 463 rank-and-file, missing.
Russians: 1,741 non-commissioned officers, rank-and-file, and 44 officers, killed or captured; 1,225, including 49 officers, wounded; 12 guns taken.
French: 815 killed or wounded, 21 prisoners, 1 gun taken by the Russians.
Batavian: 1,539 killed or wounded, 1,052 captured, 15 guns taken by the British.

== Aftermath ==
The newly appointed Russian Commander-in-Chief, Mikhail Kutuzov, who was rushing from St. Petersburg to assume command of Russian forces, learned about the debacle at Hamburg and, deeming the campaign to be doomed, promptly returned to Russia.

The Republicans re-occupied all the positions from which they had been driven, and their general line of defence was now covered on the right by inundations, the only roads across which were covered by field works. The space between Alkmaar and the Zuiderzee was thus rendered defensible by small numbers, and Amsterdam was secured on the land side. The remainder of the army, which had been reinforced, was concentrated between the Langedijk and the sea, and the post of Oudkarspel was strengthened by additional works, and by inundations. Schoorldam and Koedijk were also fortified. The next major engagement took place at Castricum on 6 October.

== Bibliography ==
- The above text is an extract from an article compiled by the British Army's Intelligence branch of the Quartermaster-General's department in 1884.
- Smith, Digby. The Napoleonic Wars Data Book. Greenhill, 1998.
- van Uythoven, Geert (2018). The Secret Expedition: The Anglo-Russian Invasion of Holland 1799. From reason to revolution 1721–1815. Vol. 19. Warwick: Helion and Company.
- The above text is an extract from an article compiled by the British Army's Intelligence branch of the Quartermaster-General's department in 1884.
- Milyutin, Dmitry (1853). История войны России с Францией в царствование Императора Павла I в 1799 году [The history of Russia's war with France during the reign of Emperor Paul I in 1799] (in Russian). Vol. 5. St. Petersburg: Типография штаба военно-учебных заведений.
- Flash-map of the Battle of Bergen-Binnen. 19 September 1799. D. Milyutin. History of the War of 1799. SPb, 1857
- Russian Casualties Battle of Bergen 2 October 1799 by D. Milyutin. Geschichte des krieges Russlands mit Frankreich under der Regierung Kaiser Paul's I. im Jahr 1799. Munich, 1856. The Napoleon Series (1998). The Waterloo Association
