= Langedijk =

- Former municipality
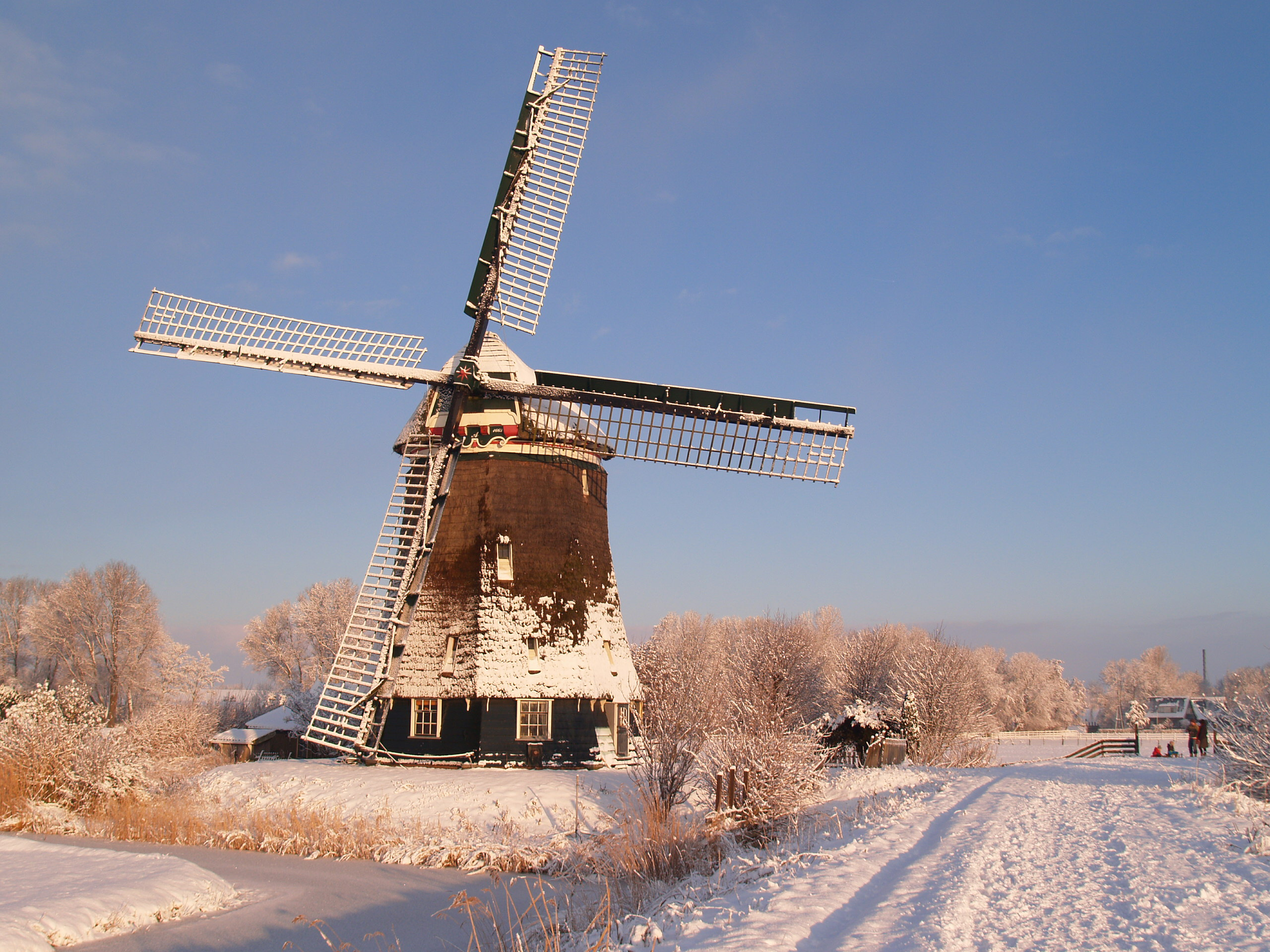
- Windmill in Sint Pancras

- Flag Coat of arms

- Location of the former municipality of Langedijk in North Holland
- Coordinates: 52°41′N 4°48′E
- Country: Netherlands
- Province: North Holland
- Municipality: Dijk en Waard

Area
  - Total: 27.03 km^{2} (10.44 sq mi)
  - Land: 23.88 km^{2} (9.22 sq mi)
  - Water: 3.15 km^{2} (1.22 sq mi)
- Elevation: −1 m (−3.3 ft)

Population (January 2021)
  - Total: 28,335
  - Density: 1,187/km^{2} (3,070/sq mi)
- Time zone: UTC+1 (CET)
  - Summer (DST): UTC+2 (CEST)
- Postcode: 1720–1724, 1830–1834
- Area code: 0226, 072

Listen to this article (3 minutes)
This audio file was created from a revision of this article dated 18 Dec 2021, and does not reflect subsequent edits.

Langedijk (Dutch: [ˌlɑŋəˈdɛik]; West Frisian Dutch: Langedìk) is a former municipality in the Netherlands, in the province of North Holland and the region of West-Frisia. Langedijk received city rights in 1415.

Langedijk and the former municipality of Heerhugowaard merged into the new municipality of Dijk en Waard on 1 January 2022.

== Population centres ==
The former municipality of Langedijk contained the following small towns and villages:

- Broek op Langedijk
- Koedijk (partly)
- Noord-Scharwoude
- Oudkarspel
- Sint Pancras
- Zuid-Scharwoude.

== Topography ==
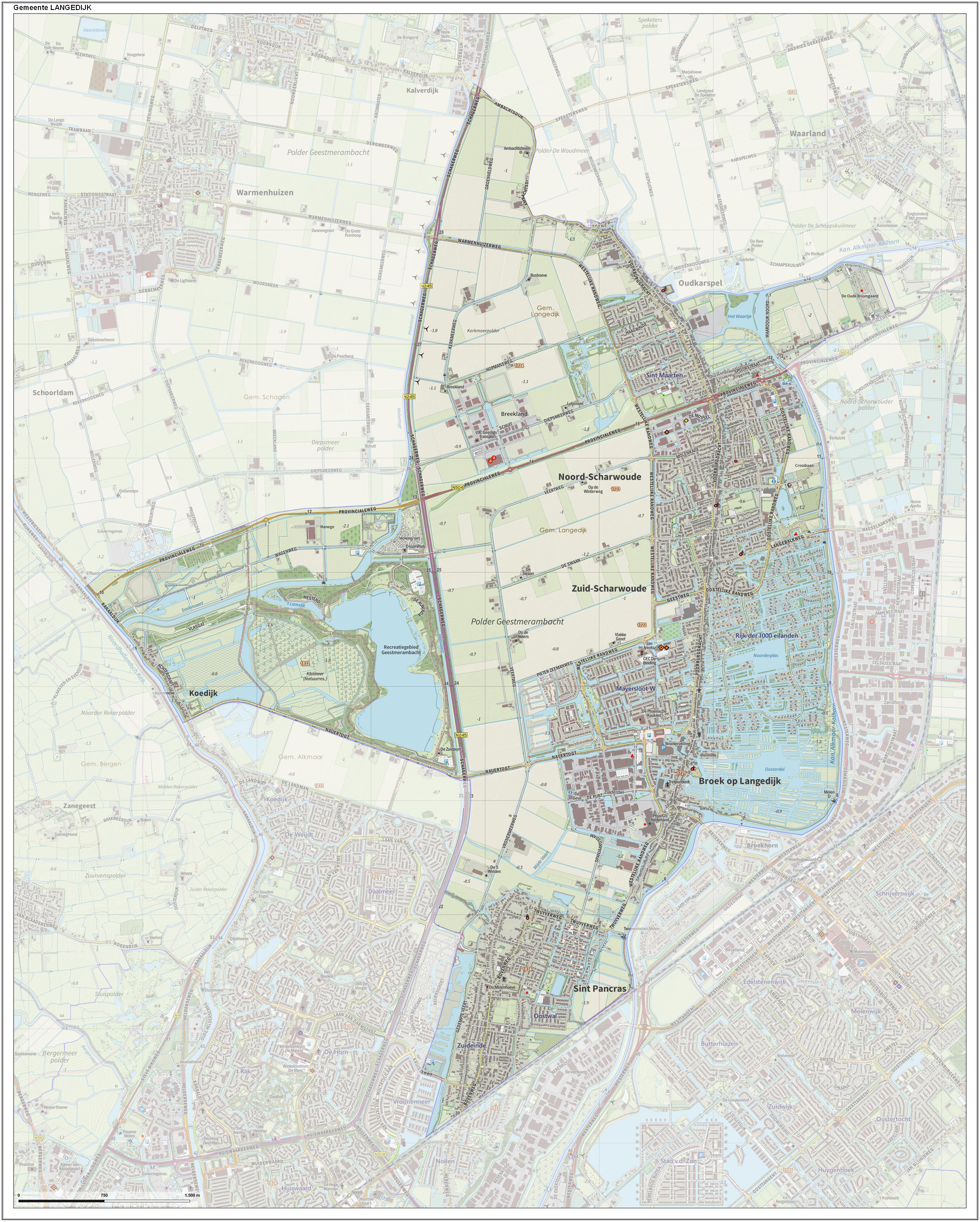
Map of the former municipality of Langedijk, 2015

== Local government ==
The former municipal council of Langedijk consisted of 21 seats, which at the last elections in 2018 divided as follows:

- Dorpsbelang Langedijk (4 seats)
- VVD (4 seats)
- Kleurrijk Langedijk (3 seats)
- CDA (2 seats)
- GroenLinks (2 seats)
- Senioren Langedijk (2 seats)
- PvdA (1 seat)
- Hart voor Langedijk/D66 (2 seats)
- ChristenUnie (1 seat)

Elections were held in November 2021 for a council for the new merged municipality of Dijk en Waard, that included Langedijk, which commenced work in January 2022.

== Notable people ==
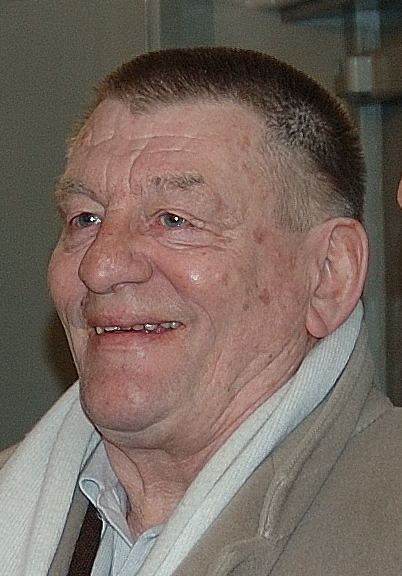
J. Bernlef, 2008

- Johannes Hertenberg (1668 in Oudkarspel – 1725) the 19th Dutch Governor of Ceylon from 1723 until his death
- Theo Nieuwenhuis (1866 in Noord-Scharwoude – 1951) a Dutch watercolor painter, lithograph designer, woodcarver and ceramics and textile designer
- Berend Tobia Boeyinga (1886 in Noord-Scharwoude – 1969) a Dutch architect, noted for his Calvinist church buildings
- Laurens Bogtman (1900 in Oudkarspel – 1969) a Dutch baritone
- Hendrik Jan Marsman (1937 in Sint Pancras – 2012), pen name, J. Bernlef, a Dutch writer, poet, novelist and translator

=== Sport ===
- Jan Langedijk (1910 in Oudkarspel – 1981), a Dutch speed skater who competed at the 1936 and 1948 Winter Olympics
- Gerard Kamper (1950 in Koedijk – 2026), a Dutch cyclist
- Jan Blokhuijsen (born 1989 in Zuid-Scharwoude), a Dutch long-track speed skater, silver medallist at the 2014 Winter Olympics

== Gallery ==
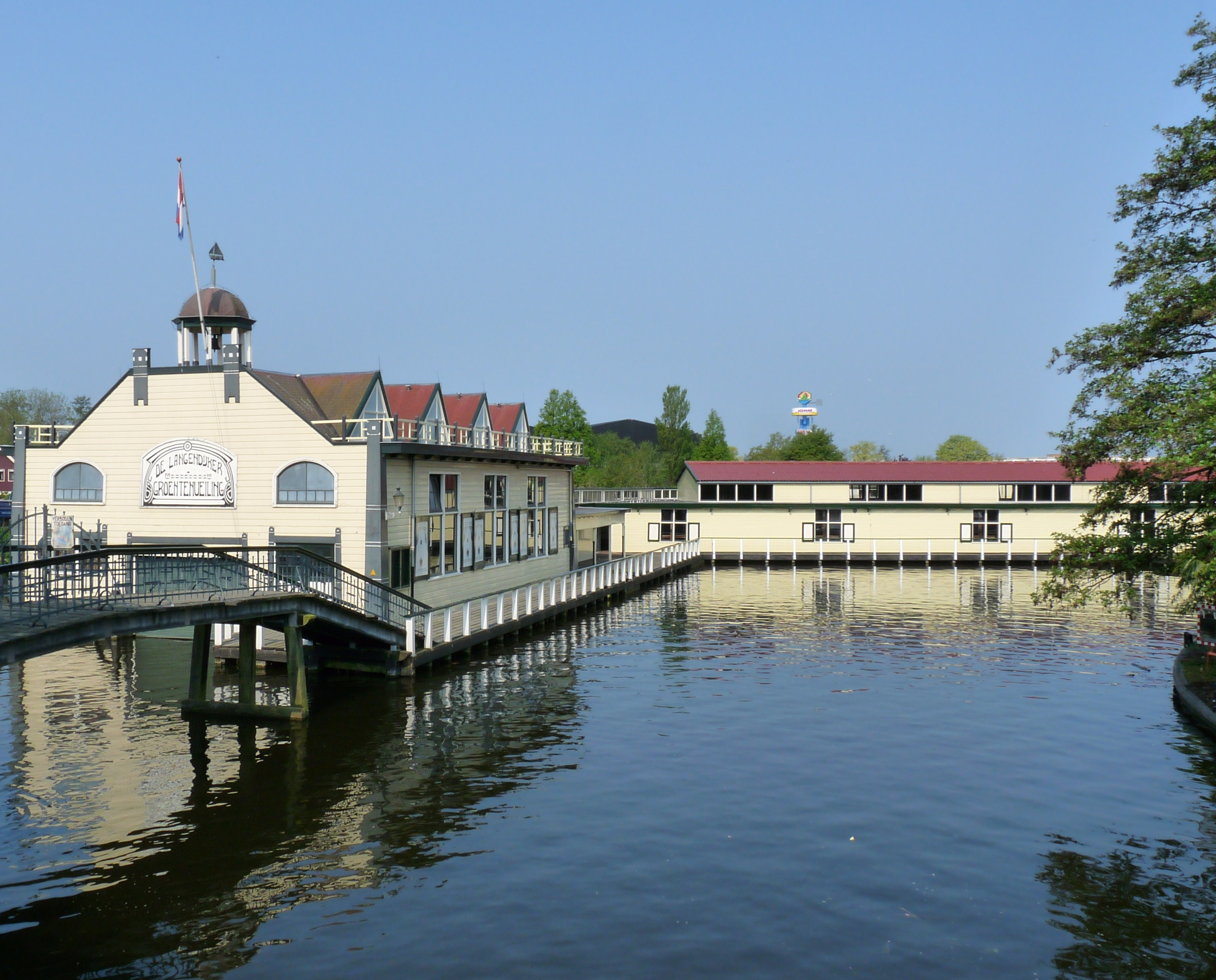
Broekerveiling

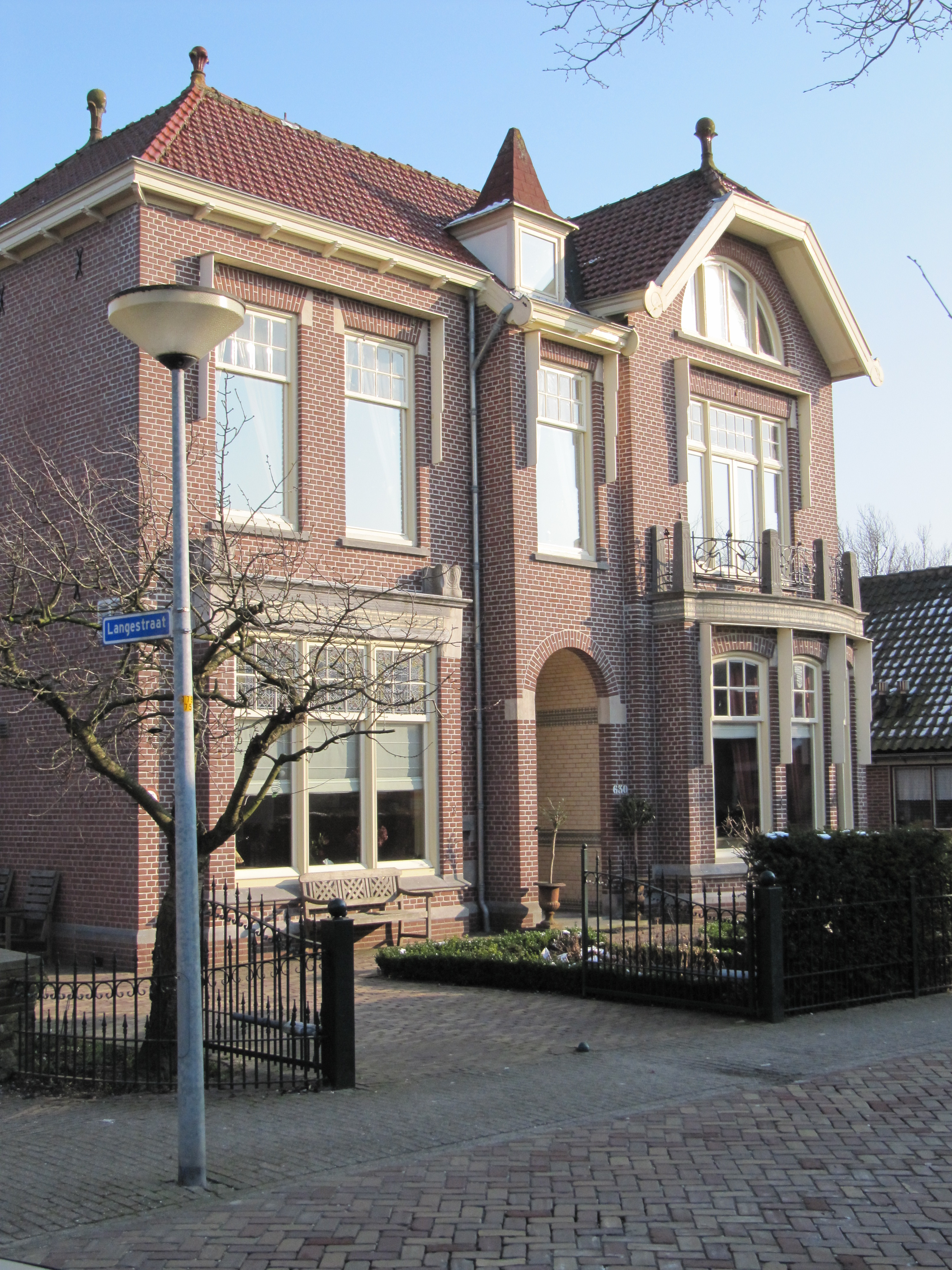
Noord-Scharwoude

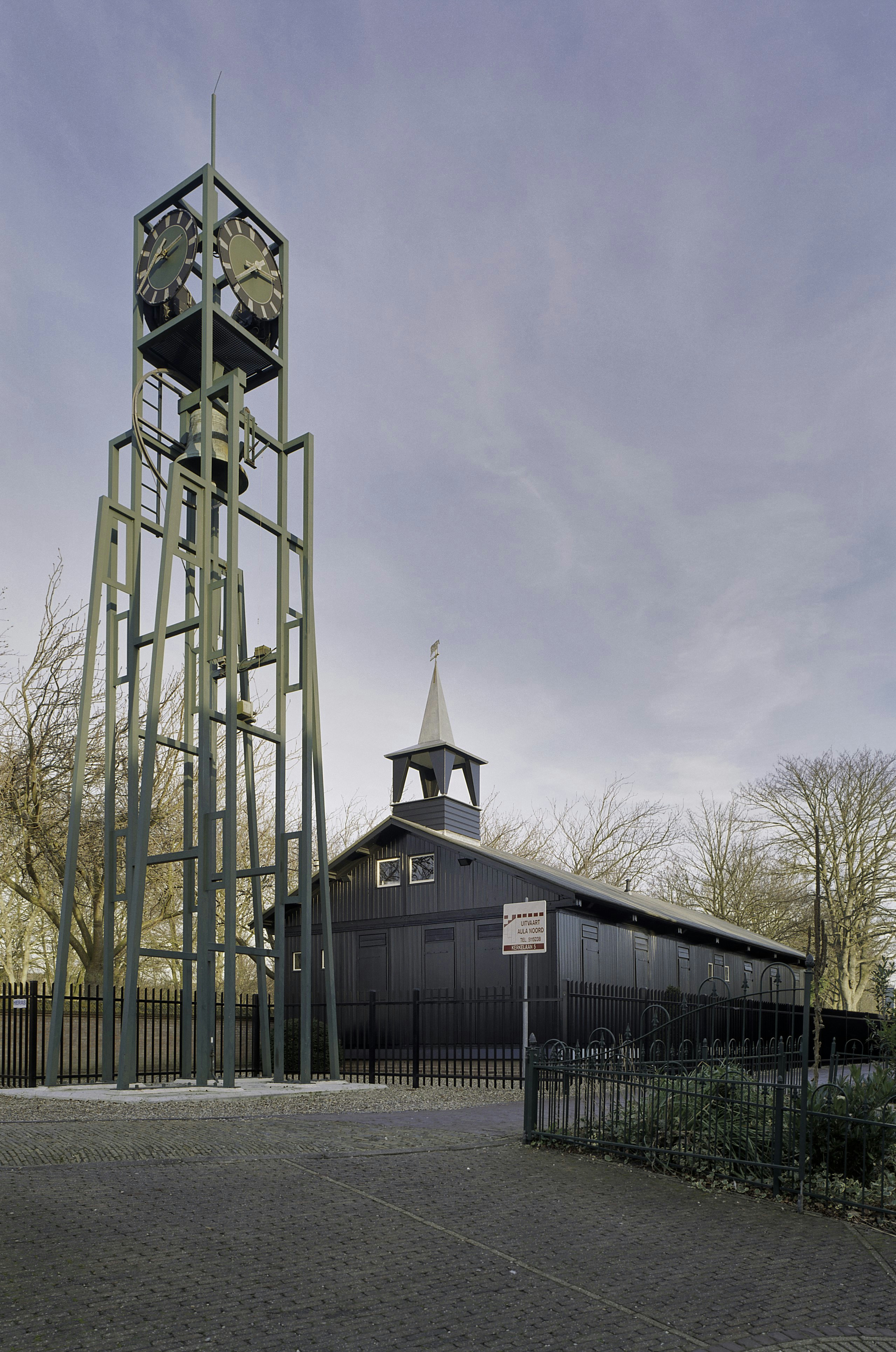
Wooden church and steel bell tower - Koedijk

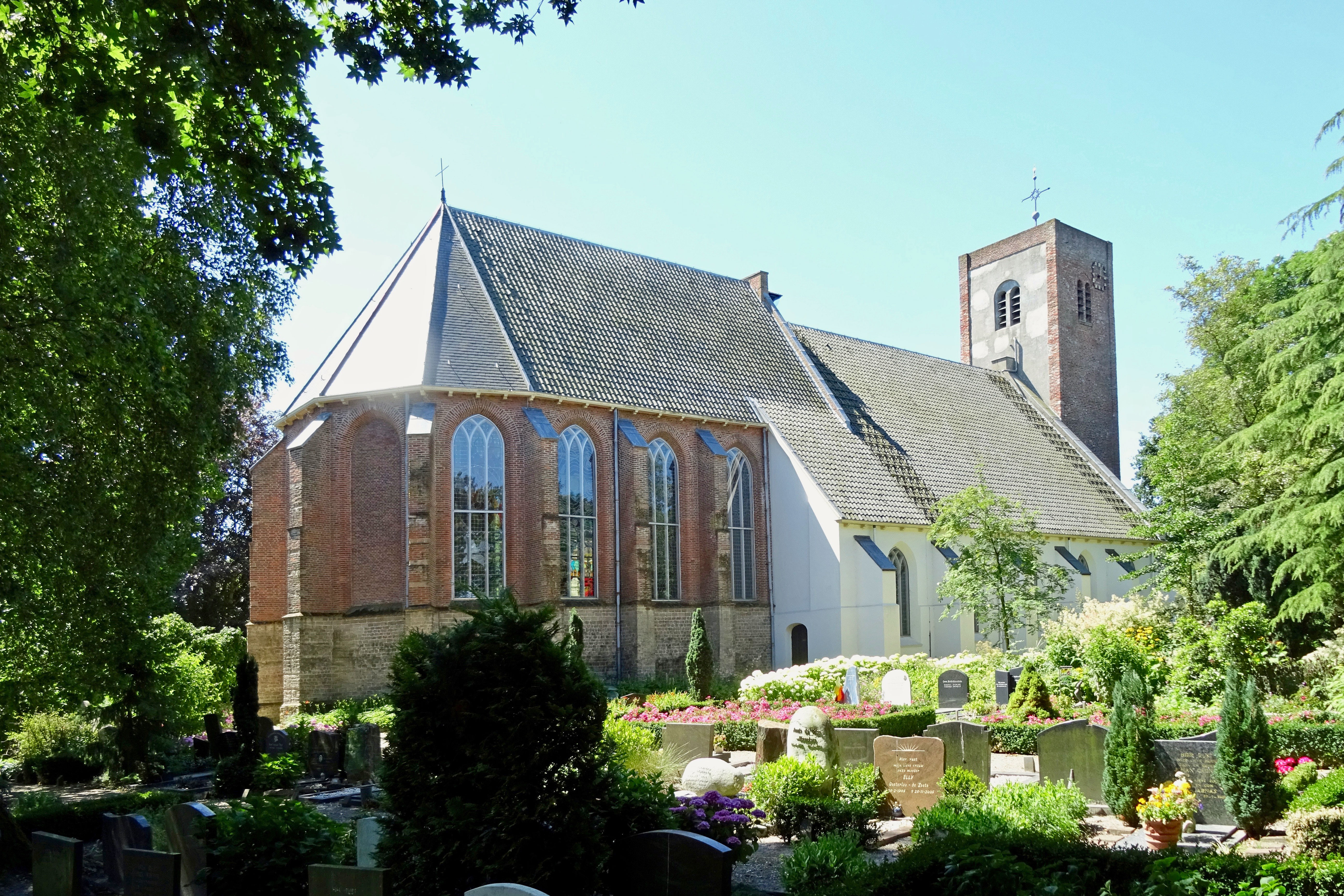
Allemanskerk - Oudkarspel

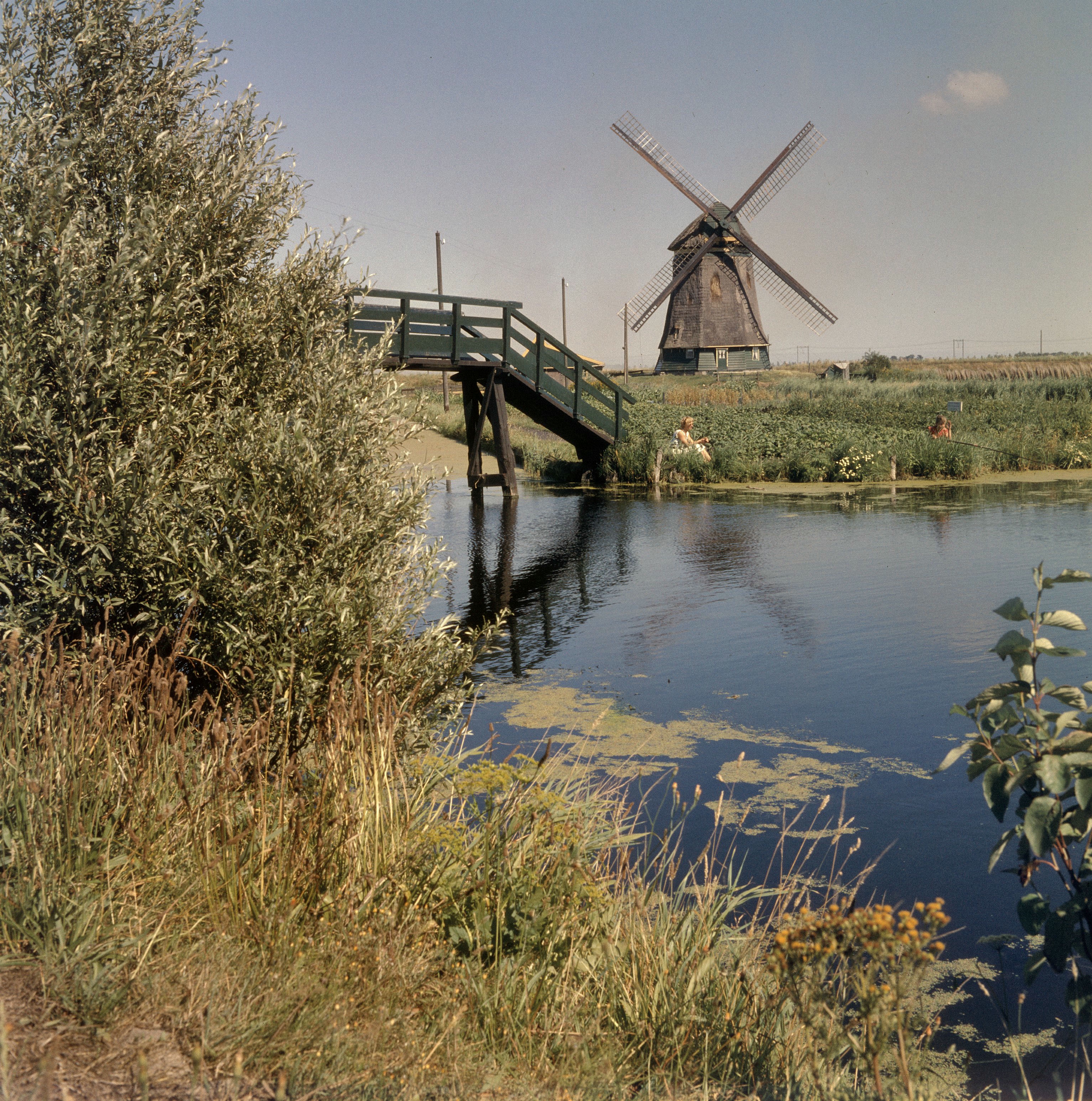
Old mill - Sint Pancras
