= Scharwoude, Langedijk =

Coordinates: 52°37′N 5°01′E

Scharwoude is a former municipality in the Dutch province of North Holland. It existed between 1812 and 1817, when it was divided into two municipalities: Noord-Scharwoude and Zuid-Scharwoude. It is now part of the municipality of Langedijk.
