= Vronen =

Former North Holland village

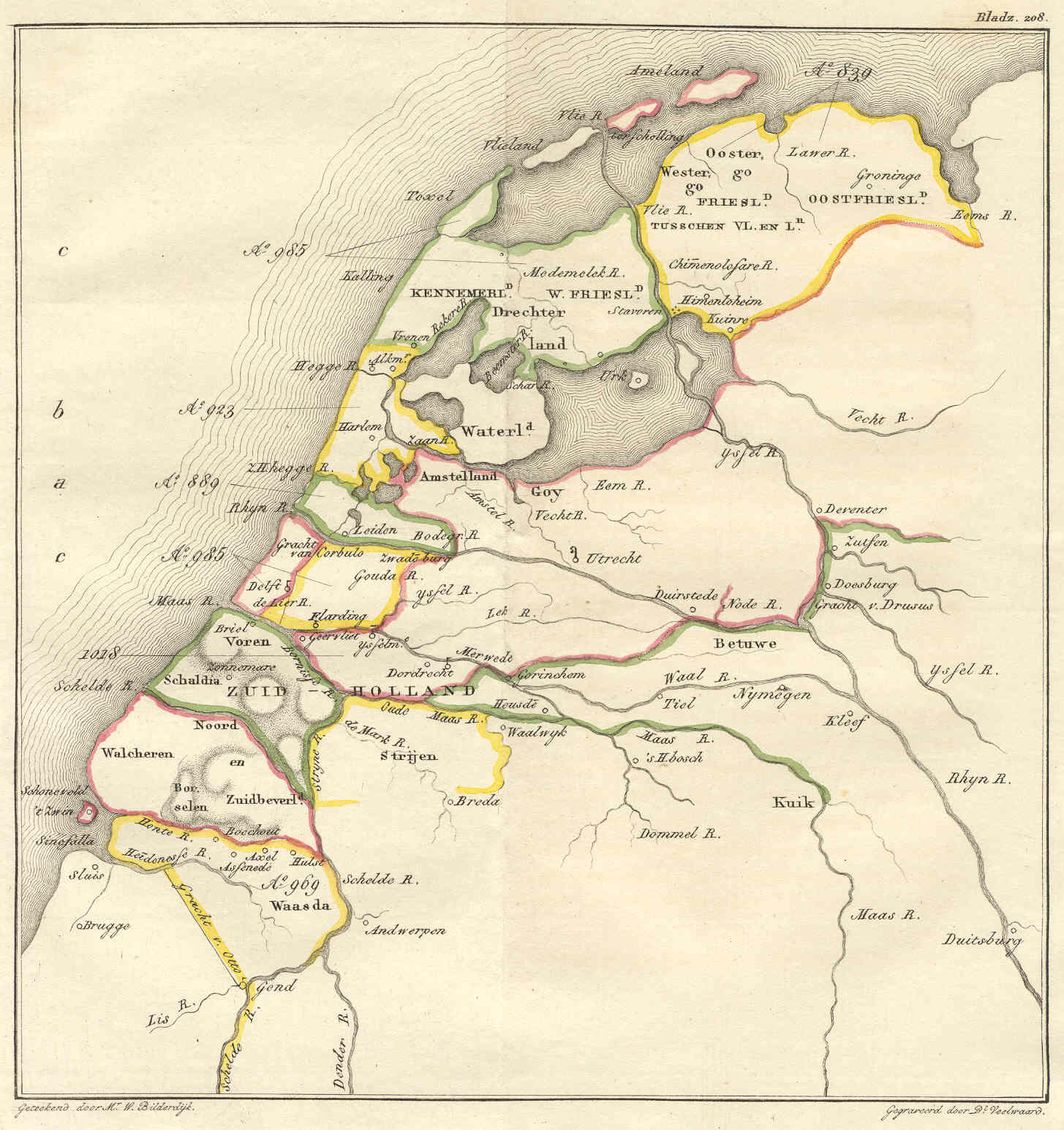

Vronen is a former village in the West Friesland region of North Holland. Its location is in the current municipality of Sint Pancras.

The Battle of Vronen was fought on March 27, 1297 between the combined armies of the Counties of Holland and Zeeland, under the leadership of John I, Count of Holland, and the rebellious West Frisians, who lost the battle.

The West Frisians were punished by the complete destruction of the village of Vronen and the resettlement of the inhabitants to the westernmost part of West Friesland, the Coedike (now Koedijk).
