= Zuid-Scharwoude =

- Village
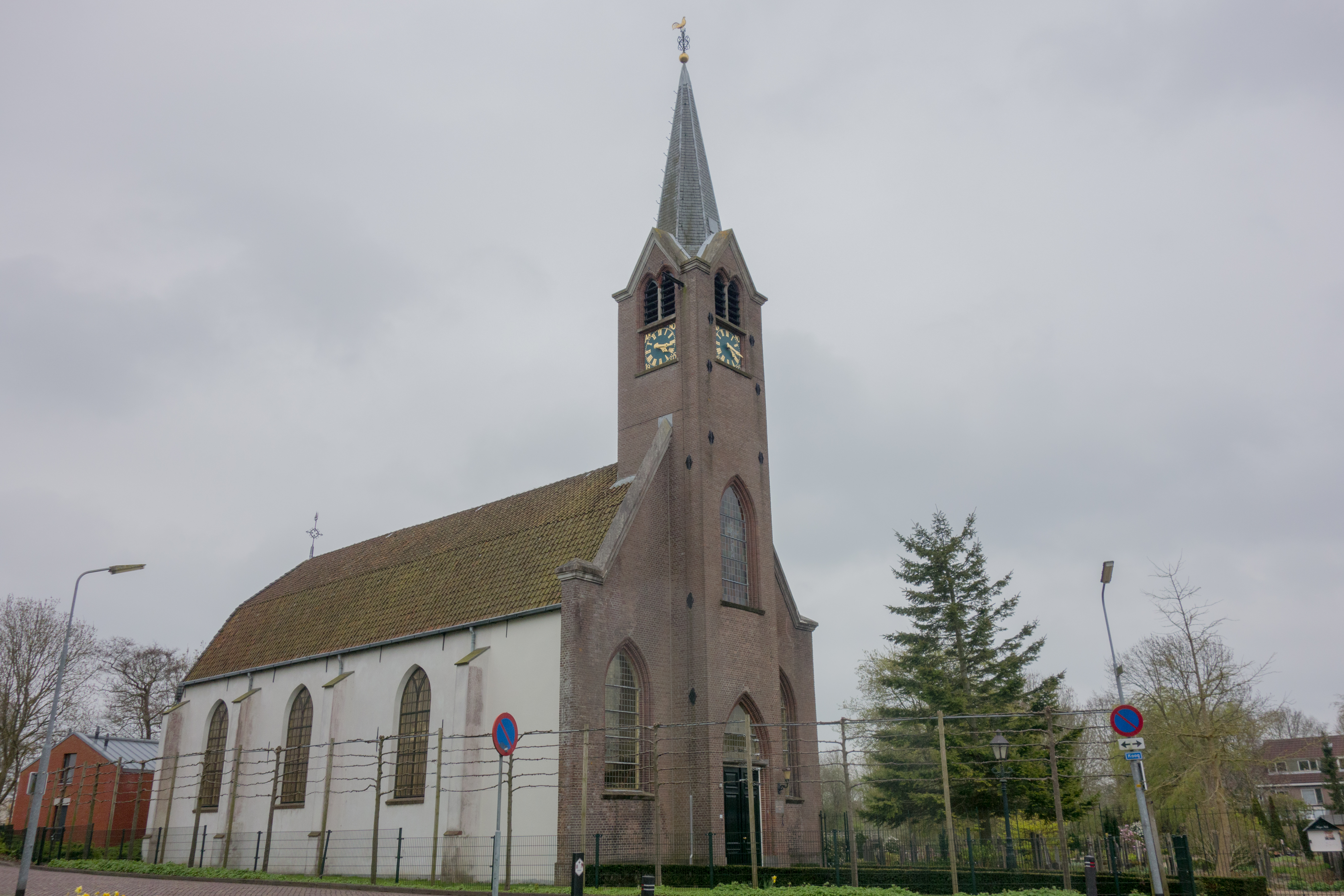
- Dutch Reformed church

- Coat of arms

- Location in the Netherlands Location in the province of North Holland in the Netherlands
- Coordinates: 52°41′N 4°49′E
- Country: Netherlands
- Province: North Holland
- Municipality: Dijk en Waard

Area
  - Total: 5.02 km^{2} (1.94 sq mi)
- Elevation: −0.4 m (−1.3 ft)

Population (2025)
  - Total: 6,875
  - Density: 1,370/km^{2} (3,550/sq mi)
- Time zone: UTC+1 (CET)
  - Summer (DST): UTC+2 (CEST)
- Postal code: 1722
- Dialing code: 0226

Zuid-Scharwoude (West Frisian: Sûd-Skerwou) is a town in the Dutch province of North Holland. It is located in the municipality of Dijk en Waard, about 8 km northwest of Alkmaar.

== History ==
The village was first mentioned in 1094 as Sudrekercha. The current name means "southern forest near Schoorl". Zuid (south) was added to distinguish from Noord-Scharwoude. Zuid-Scharwoude developed in the 11th century as a linear settlement along a dike.

The Dutch Reformed church was built in the 15th century as a replacement of a 12th-century church, and renovated in 1819. In 1905, the tower collapsed and the church was shortened with a built-in tower.

Zuid-Scharwoude was home to 626 people in 1840. It was a separate municipality between 1817 and 1941, when it became a part of Langedijk. It used to be the capital of Langedijk. Since 2022 it has become part of the new municipality of Dijk en Waard.

== Gallery ==
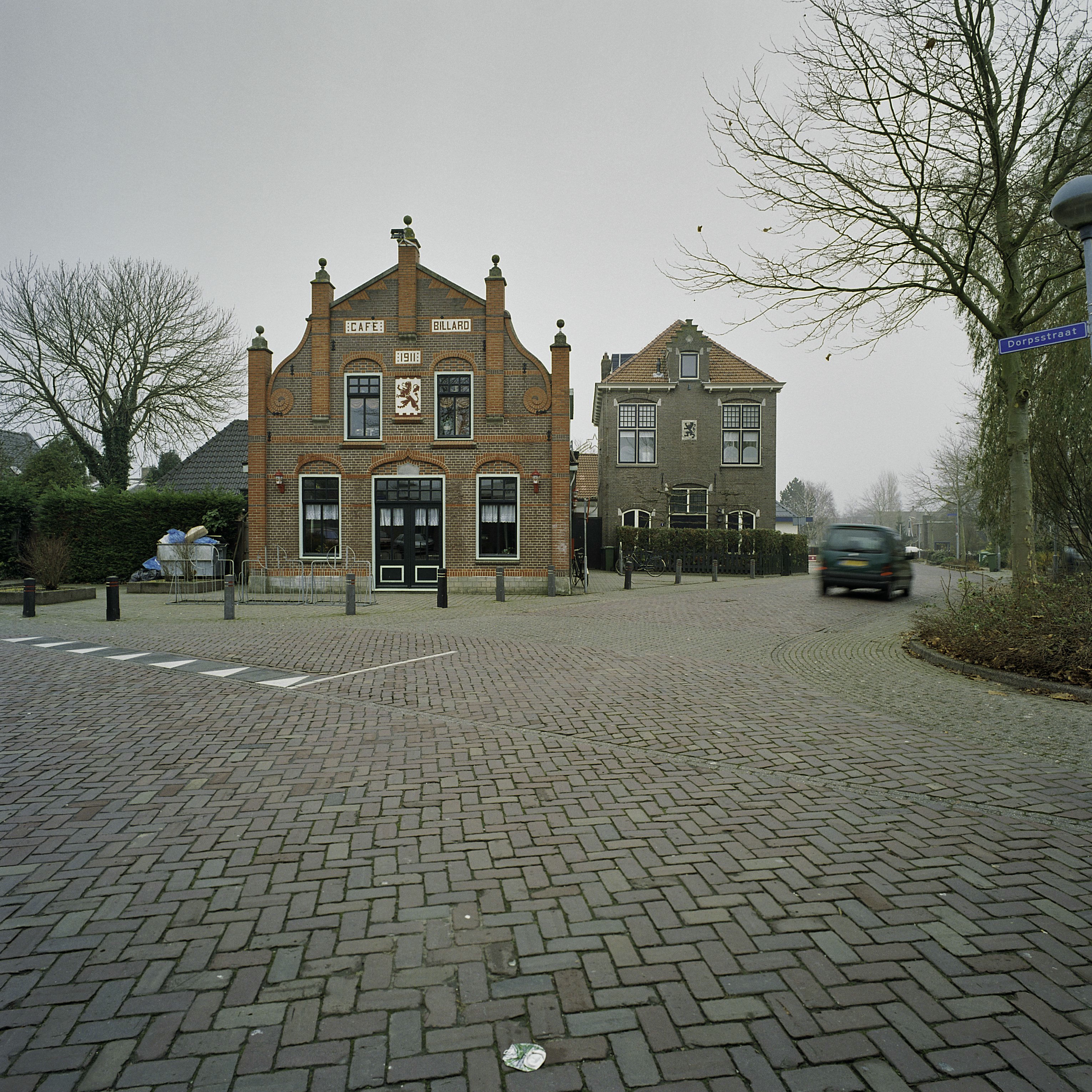
Bar in Zuid-Scharwoude

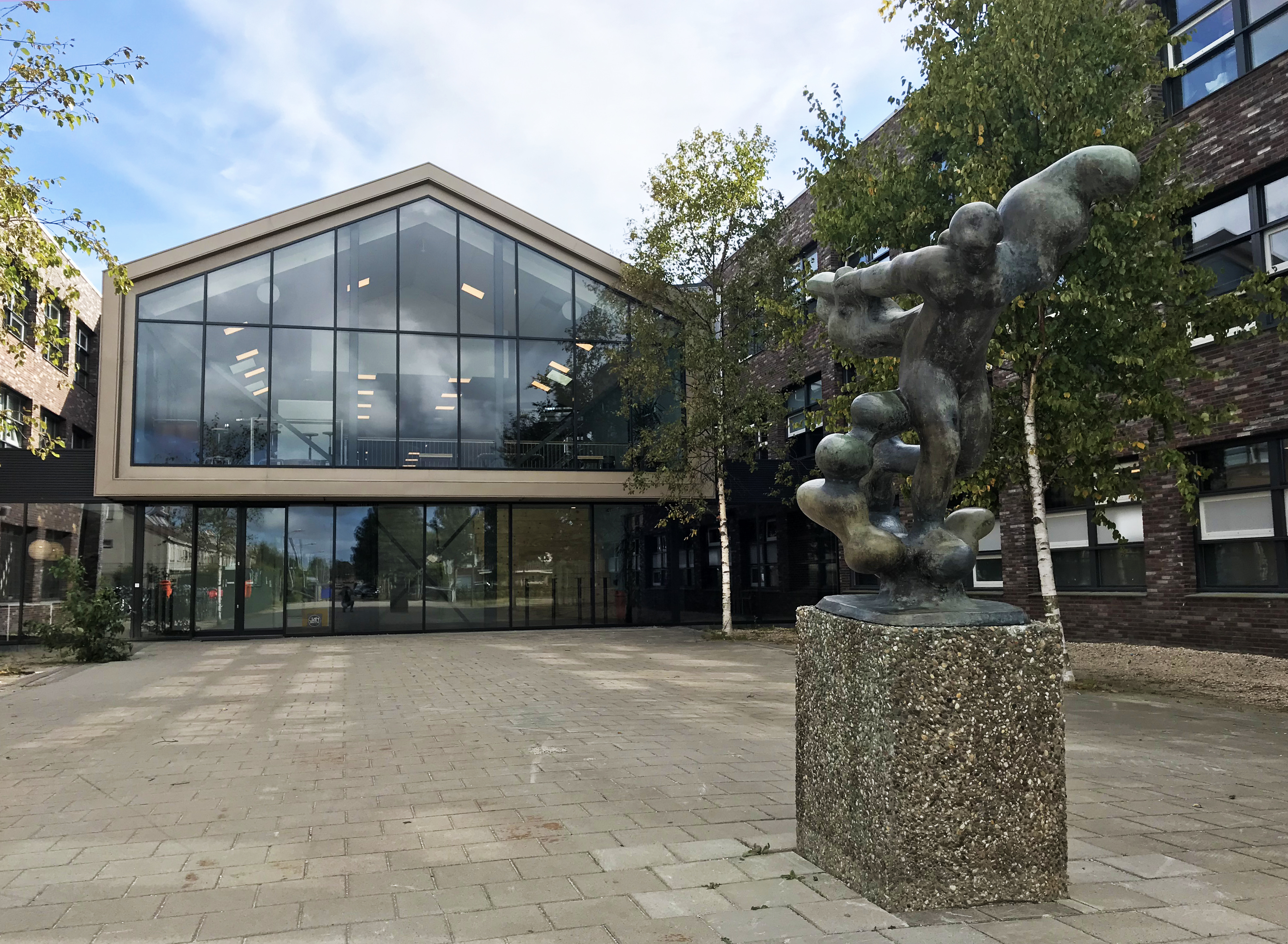
Statue in Zuid-Scharwoude

== See also ==
- Scharwoude, Langendijk
