= Theo Nieuwenhuis =

Dutch watercolor painter, lithograph designer and woodcarver

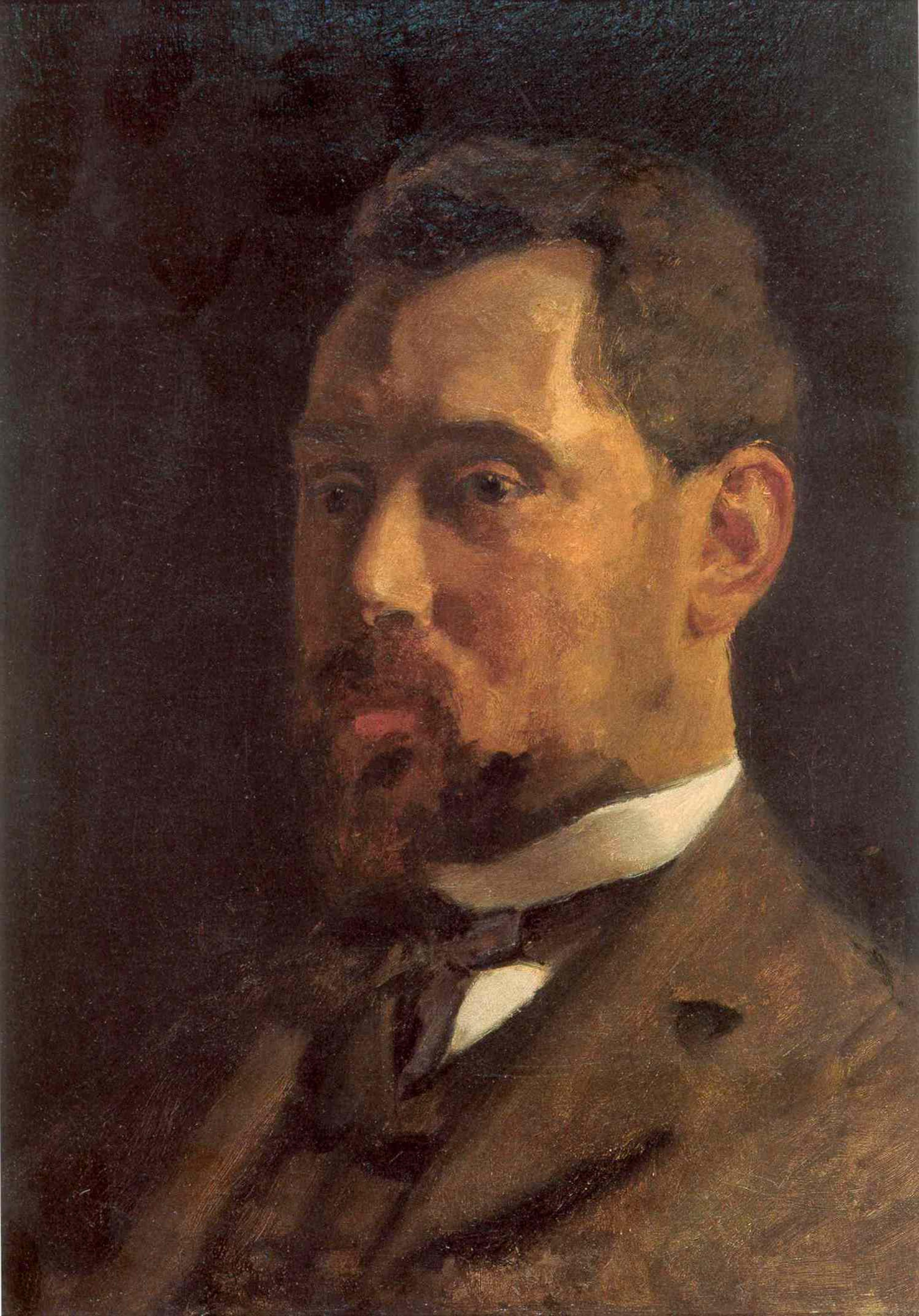
Nieuwenhuis' portrait from around 1906 by Willem Witsen (Collection of the Amsterdam Museum)

Theodore (Theo) Wilhelmus Nieuwenhuis (26 April 1866, Noord-Scharwoude - 5 December 1951, Hilversum) was a Dutch watercolor painter, lithograph designer, woodcarver, ceramics, textile designer, furniture designer, decorative artist and interior designer. He is known as one of the best Dutch artists to work in the style called Nieuwe Kunst (Art Nouveau), which he applied to many different media.

== Education and career ==
Nieuwenhuis was educated at the State Normal School for Applied Art and the Royal Academy of Fine Arts in Amsterdam, where he was a pupil of John Roelof de Kruyff.

Nieuwenhuis traveled extensively in his early career. Based in Amsterdam from 1883 to 1888, he visited Germany and Austria, then moved to Paris, where he remained until 1890. He was in Leeuwarden in 1891, Amstelveen during 1893, Epe in 1895, before resettling in Amsterdam again from 1895 to 1933. After 1941 he relocated to Rotterdam and Blaricum.

Nieuwenhuis drew plants and animals in an ornate style, and is best known as a designer of furniture and complete interiors, but he also designed printing, book covers and calendars. His interiors include the Shipping House, Amsterdam, which also makes use of stucco and cement; and "Harmony" in Groningen. He also designed interiors for passenger ships and patterns for carpets.

Nieuwenhuis collaborated with both G.W. Dijsselhof and C.A. Lion Cachet on graphic designs. The charters which they completed in 1892 for the Society for the Promotion of Medicine are considered as one of the first manifestations of Nieuwe Kunst. He also worked for Philips from 1916 to 1918. The book Naamloze Vennootschap Philips' Gloeilampenfabrieken 1891-1916 was compiled by Jan Feith for the Eindhoven firm, and Nieuwenhuis was responsible for the decoration of the band, the vignettes and decorative edges of the album.

Nieuwenhuis worked from 1898 to 1924 for the firm of E.J. Wisselingh, an art gallery and studio for industrial art in Amsterdam and he worked for a time as a designer at the pottery Thistle. Nieuwenhuis was a member of Arti et Amicitiae in (Amsterdam) and was teacher of Roelf Gerbrands and Leo Visser.

== Sources ==
- Scheen 1969–1970
- Witt Checklist 1978
- Scheen 1981, p. 372
- Eliëns/Groot/Leidelmeijer 1996, p. 233
- Ernst Braches, Bouwstoffen Nieuwe Kunst, pp. 751–823
