= Sint Pancras =

- Village
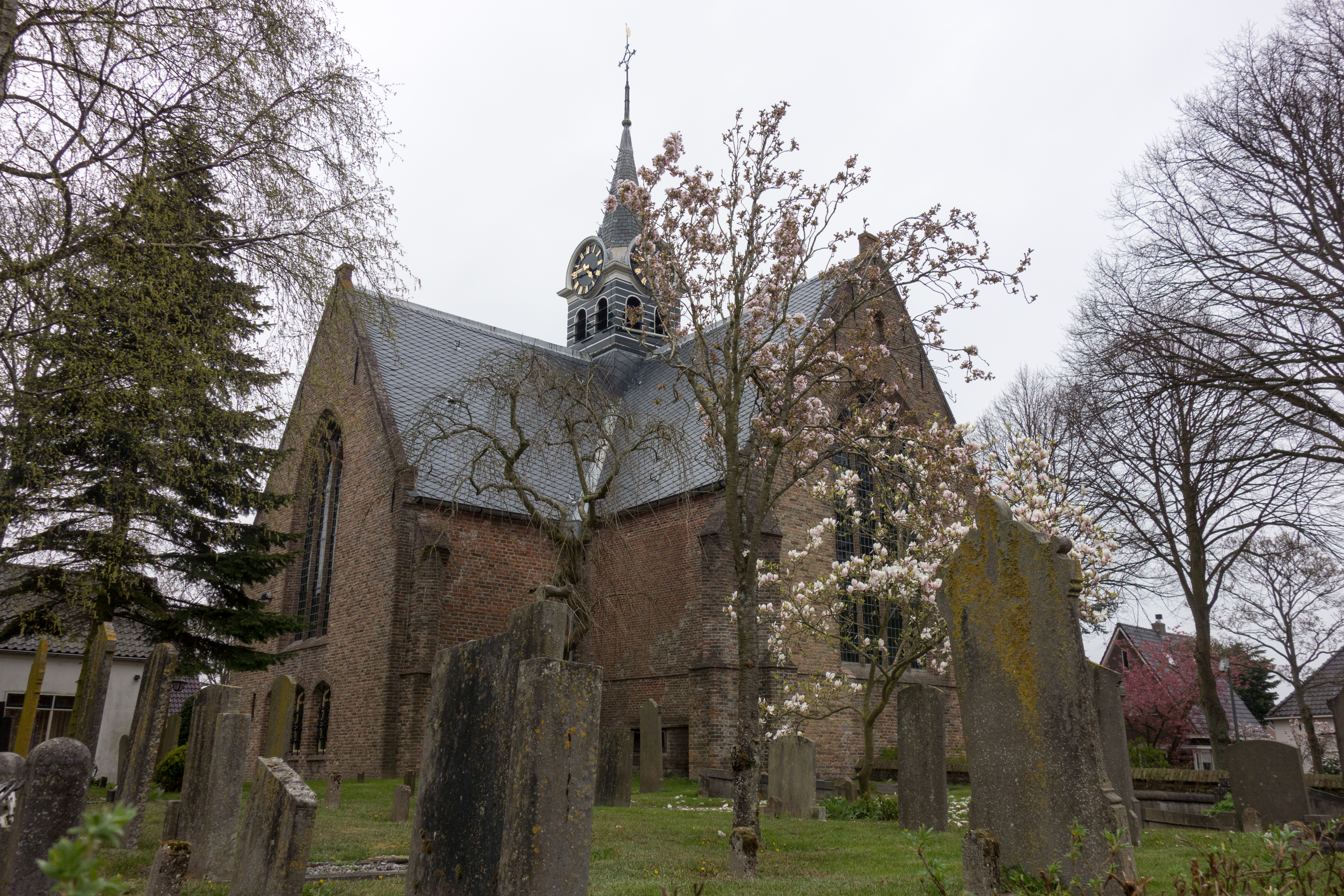
- Dutch Reformed church

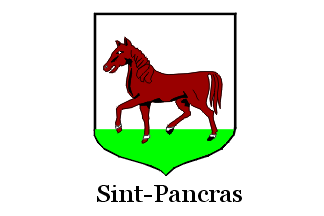
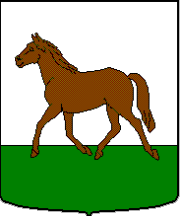
- Flag Coat of arms

- Location in the Netherlands Location in the province of North Holland in the Netherlands
- Coordinates: 52°39′47″N 4°47′7″E
- Country: Netherlands
- Province: North Holland
- Municipality: Dijk en Waard

Area
  - Village: 3.08 km^{2} (1.19 sq mi)
- Elevation: −0.5 m (−1.6 ft)

Population (2025)
  - Village: 5,860
  - Density: 1,900/km^{2} (4,930/sq mi)
  - Urban: 5,795
  - Rural: 65
- Time zone: UTC+1 (CET)
  - Summer (DST): UTC+2 (CEST)
- Postal code: 1834
- Dialing code: 072

Sint Pancras (West Frisian: Sundebankreas) is a town in the northwestern Netherlands. It is located in the municipality of Dijk en Waard, North Holland, about 5 km (3 mi) northeast of Alkmaar.

== History ==
The village was founded in the 14th century, after the village of Vronen was destroyed by John I, Count of Holland, because West Friesland had revolted against his rule in 1297. It was first mentioned in 1433 as Pancraets, and refers to Pancras of Rome.

The Dutch Reformed church is a single aisled cruciform church from the 16th century. In 1604, the tower burnt down and a lantern tower was constructed as a replacement.

The polder mill A was built in 1663. It was one of ten wind mills to drain the excess water from the polder and the only one remaining. It became obsolete in 1926. In 2010, it was restored to working order, however the drainage canal had been filled up. In 2018, pipes were laid to allow the wind mill to operate again.

Sint Pancras was home to 330 people in 1840. It was a separate municipality from 1817 to 1990, when it was merged with Langedijk. In 2022, it became part of the new municipality of Dijk en Waard.

== Gallery ==
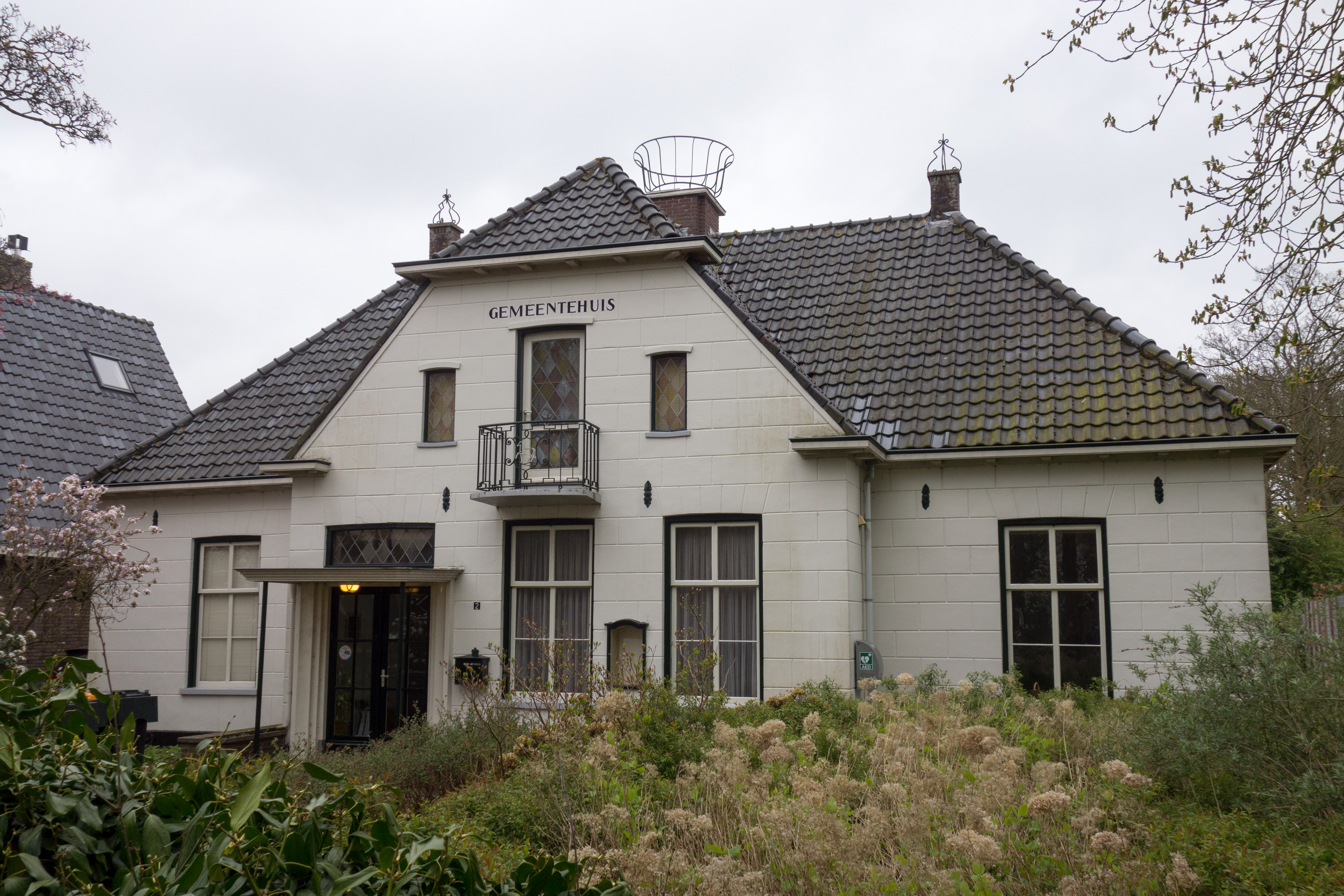
Former town hall

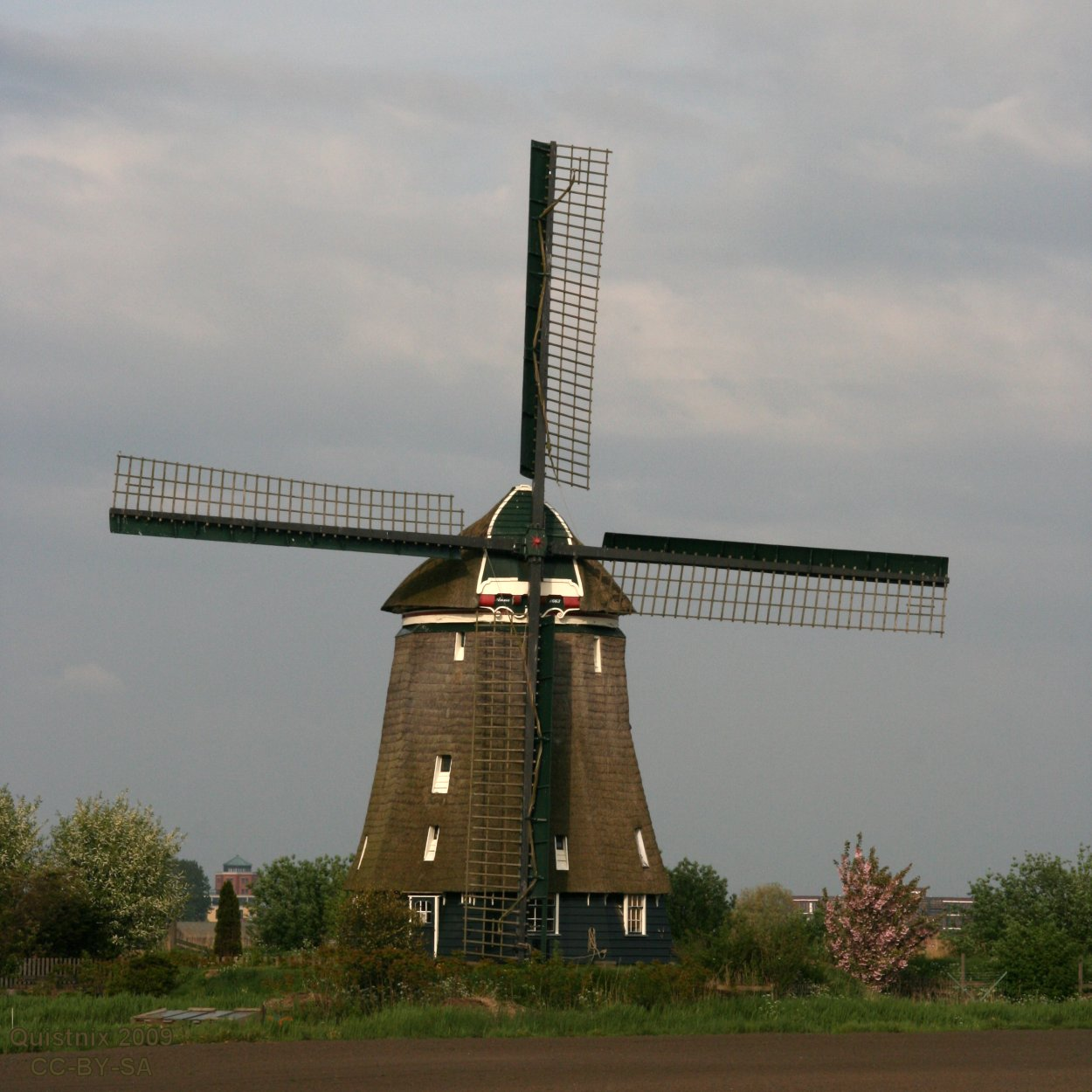
Wind mill A
