= Schoorldam =

- Hamlet
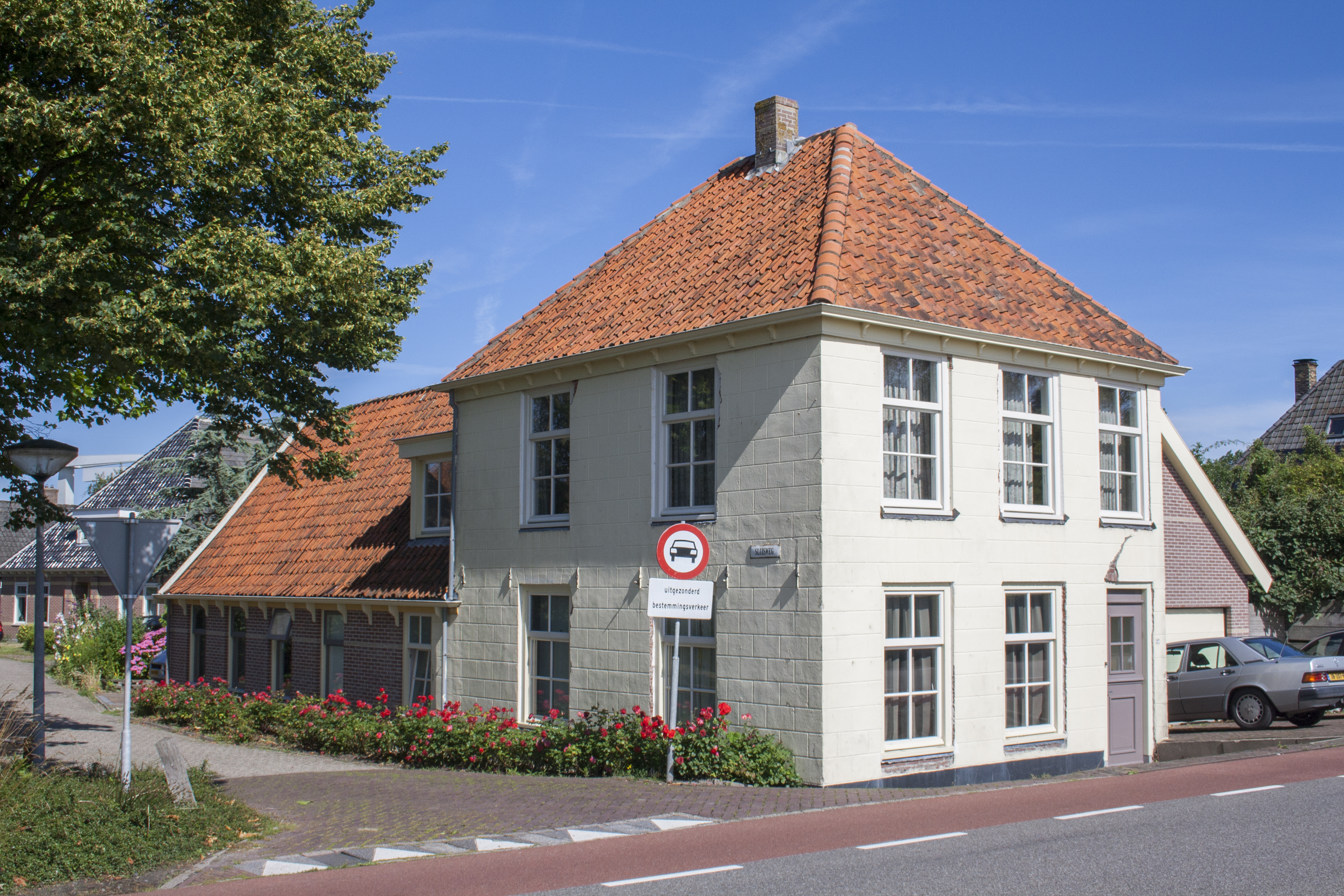
- Former pub

- Location in the Netherlands Location in the province of North Holland in the Netherlands
- Coordinates: 52°42′23″N 4°43′5″E
- Country: Netherlands
- Province: North Holland
- Municipality: Bergen; Schagen

Area
  - Total: 0.68 km^{2} (0.26 sq mi)
- Elevation: 2.2 m (7.2 ft)

Population (2025)
  - Total: 310
  - Density: 460/km^{2} (1,200/sq mi)
- Time zone: UTC+1 (CET)
  - Summer (DST): UTC+2 (CEST)
- Postal code: 1871
- Dialing code: 072

Schoorldam (West Frisian: Skorledam) is a hamlet in the Dutch province of North Holland. It is partially in the municipality of Bergen, and partially in the municipality of Schagen.

The hamlet was first mentioned in 1569 as Schoorldam, and means "dam (in the Rekere river) near Schoorl".
