= Koedijk =

- Village
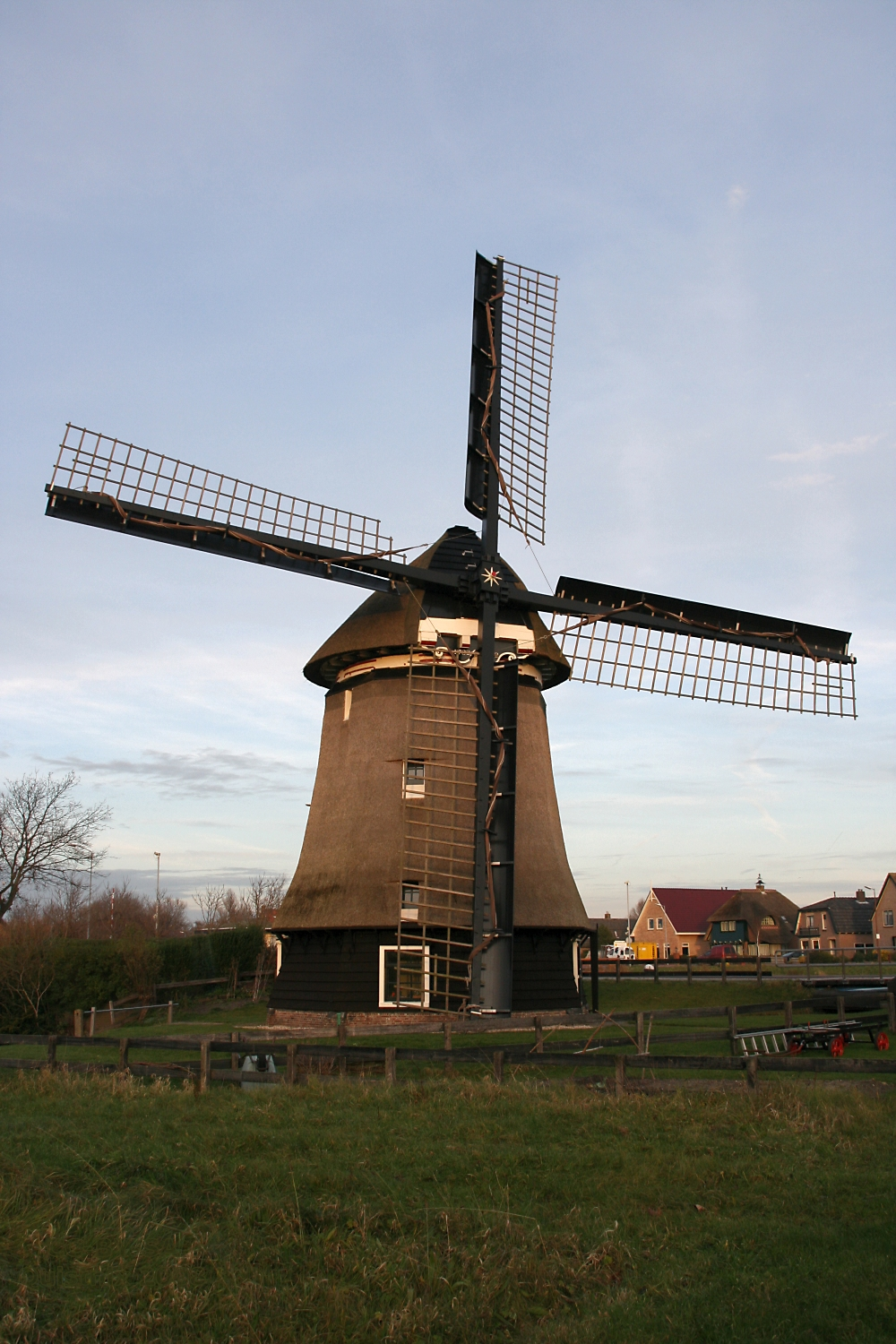
- Koedijk - Sluismolen

- Coat of arms

- Location in the Netherlands Location in the province of North Holland in the Netherlands
- Coordinates: 52°40′30″N 4°44′54″E
- Country: Netherlands
- Province: North Holland
- Municipality: Alkmaar; Dijk en Waard

Area
  - Total: 4.71 km^{2} (1.82 sq mi)
- Elevation: −0.2 m (−0.66 ft)

Population (2021)
  - Total: 2,695
  - Density: 572/km^{2} (1,480/sq mi)
- Time zone: UTC+1 (CET)
  - Summer (DST): UTC+2 (CEST)
- Postal code: 1831 & 1832
- Dialing code: 072

Koedijk is a village in the Netherlands, in the province of North Holland. It is now part of both Alkmaar and of Dijk en Waard, but before 1972, those two parts were a separate municipality that was first mentioned in the 14th century. Koedijk is most famous for its annual gondelvaart (gondola parade) on the third Saturday of August.

The name Koedijk means cow dyke. The Coedijc was the dike that protected the village of Vronen from the waters of the Rekere (or Recker), a tidal stream that ran about where the Noordhollandsch Kanaal is now located.

The village of Vronen was completely abandoned in 1297. The population was displaced when the village was destroyed after the battle between West Friesland and Holland, and relocated to the Coedijc. The old area of Vronen belonged to the new parish of Koedijk from then on.

Koedijk is, as of 2017, the location of two of the five operational vlotbruggen ("float bridges"): Koedijkervlotbrug and Rekervlotbrug.

== Notable people ==
- Johannes Megapolensis (1603–1670), missionary to the Mohawk people in New Netherland
- Jan Buiskool (1899–1960), lawyer and Prime Minister of Suriname

== Gallery ==
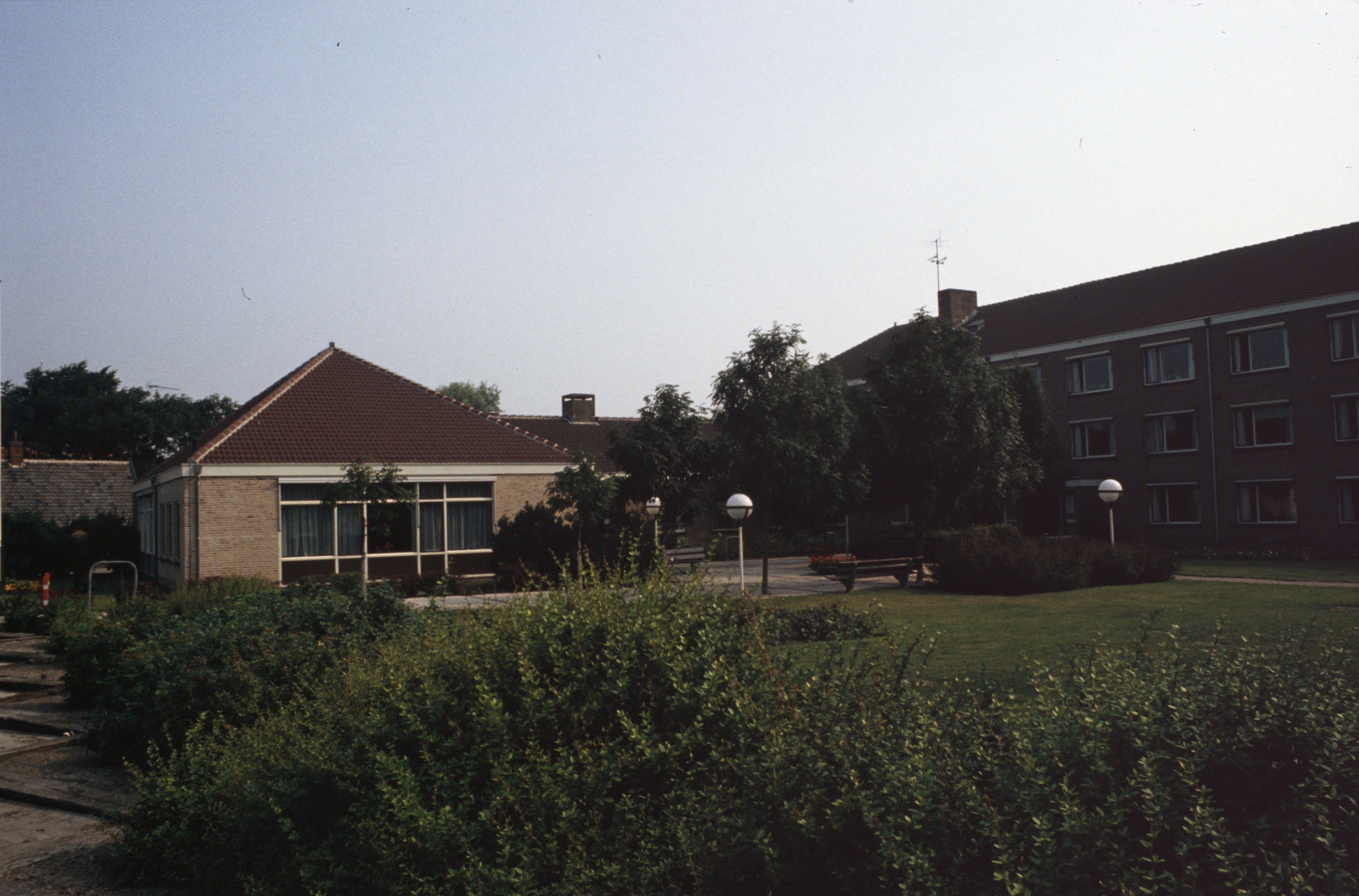
Retirement home

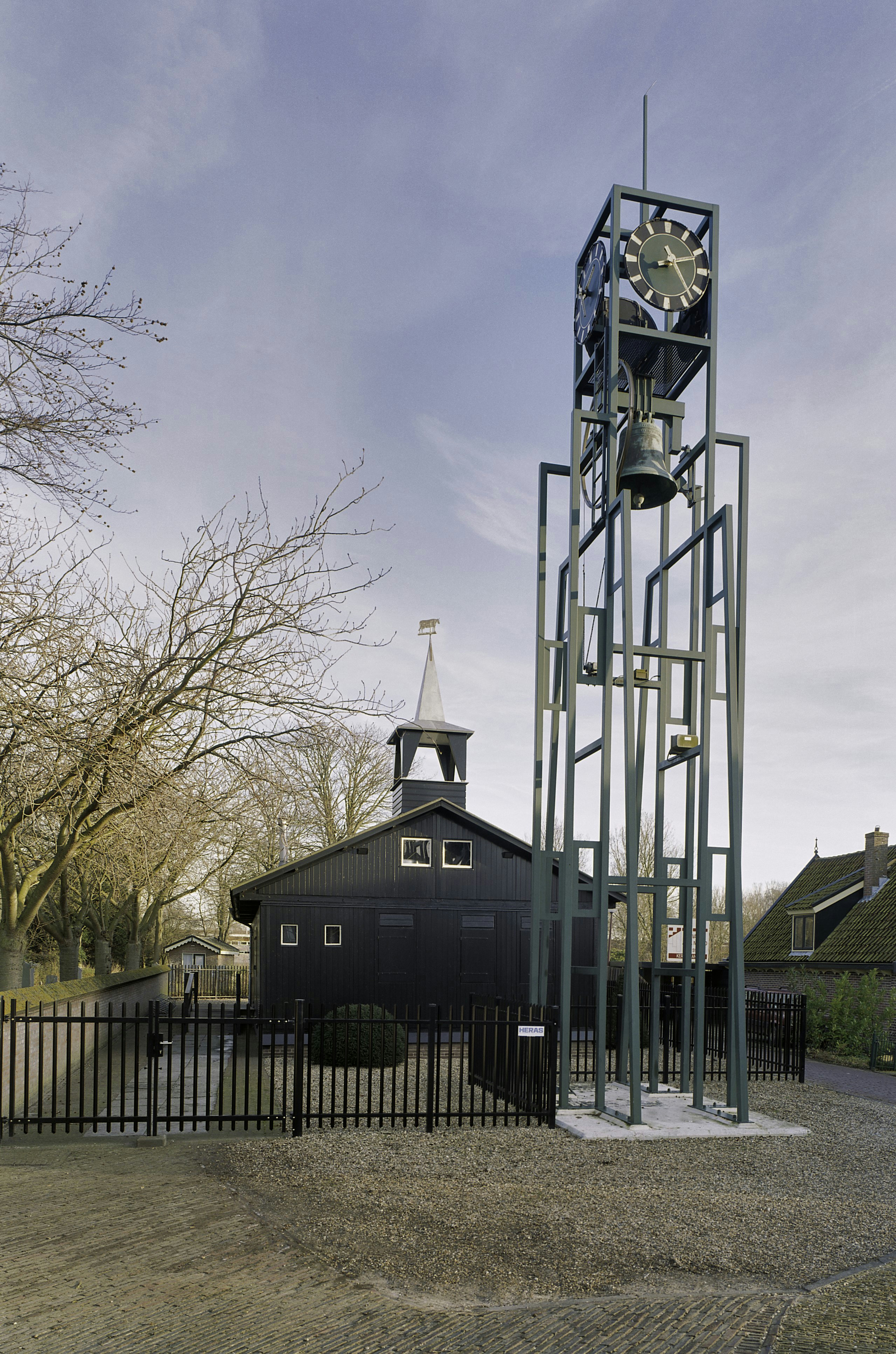
Wooden Dutch Reformed church with steel belfry

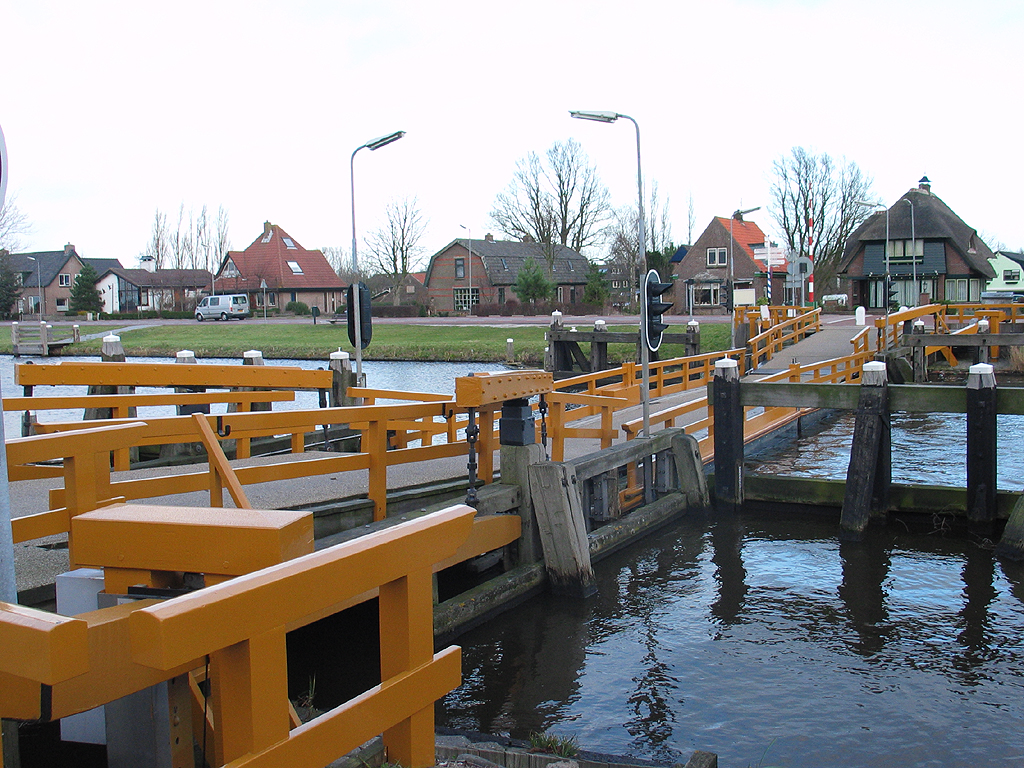
Floating bridge

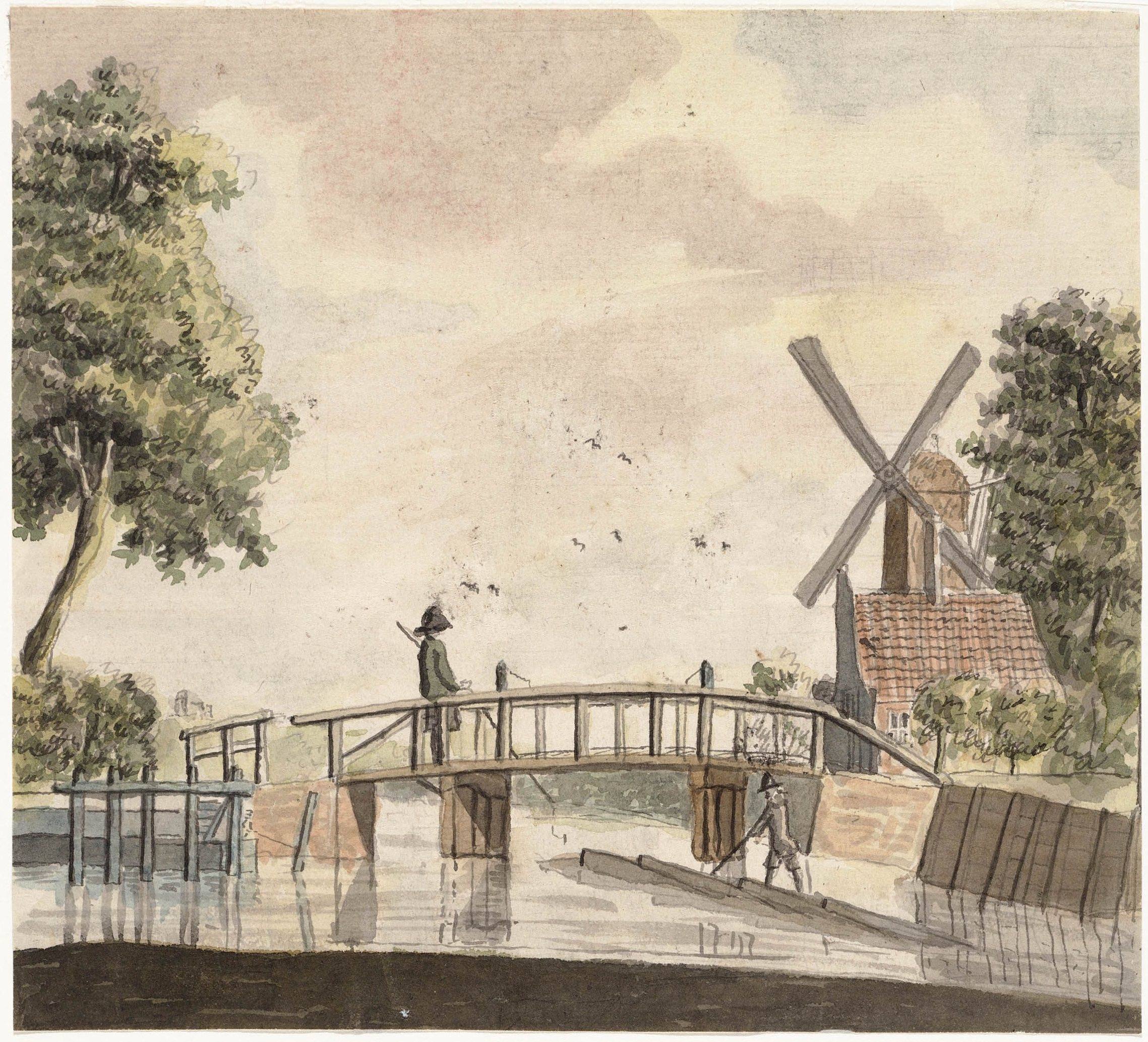
Painting of Koedijk (1790)
