= Noord-Scharwoude =

- Village
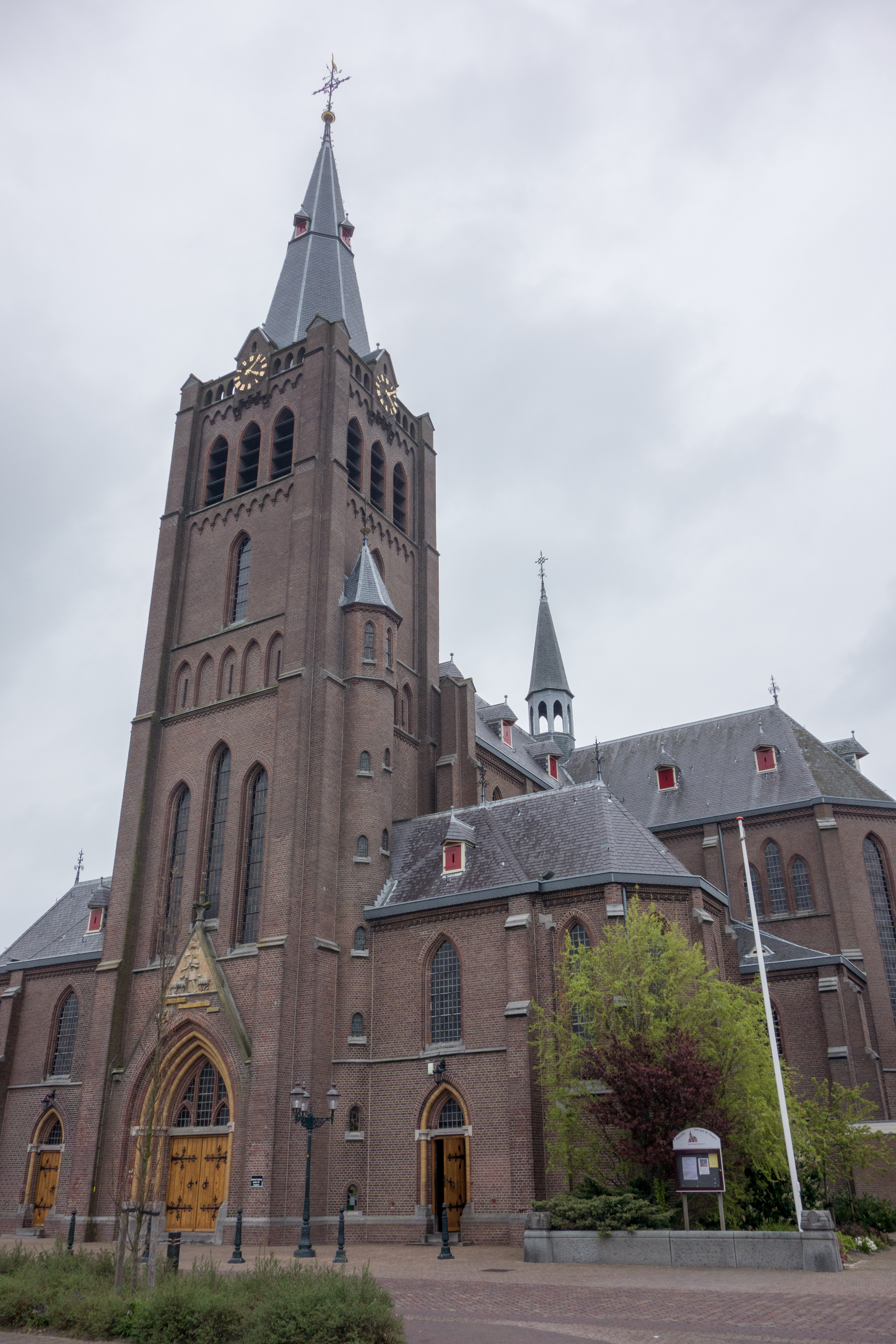
- John the Baptist church

- Coat of arms

- Location in the Netherlands Location in the province of North Holland in the Netherlands
- Coordinates: 52°42′N 4°49′E
- Country: Netherlands
- Province: North Holland
- Municipality: Dijk en Waard

Area
  - Total: 4.12 km^{2} (1.59 sq mi)
- Elevation: −0.4 m (−1.3 ft)

Population (2025)
  - Total: 6,045
  - Density: 1,470/km^{2} (3,800/sq mi)
- Time zone: UTC+1 (CET)
  - Summer (DST): UTC+2 (CEST)
- Postal code: 1723
- Dialing code: 0226

Noord-Scharwoude (West Frisian: Noôrd-Skerwou) is a village in the municipality of Dijk en Waard in the province of North Holland, Netherlands.

== History ==
The village was first mentioned in 1094 as Bernardeskercha. The current name means "northern forest belonging to Schoorl". Noord (north) was added to distinguish from Zuid-Scharwoude. Noord-Scharwoude developed in the 11th century as a linear settlement on a dike.

The Catholic John the Baptist church is a three aisled basilica-like church built between 1905 and 1906 as a replacement of an 1856 church.

Noord-Scharwoude was home to 634 people in 1840. It was a separate municipality between 1817 and 1941, when the new municipality Langedijk was created. There used to be a tram line to Alkmaar which was used to transport vegetables to the auction in the village. In 1934, the tram line closed and was reconstructed as a road. The auction no longer exists, and has been converted into apartment buildings. In 2022, Noord-Scharwoude became part of the new municipality of Dijk en Waard.

== Gallery ==
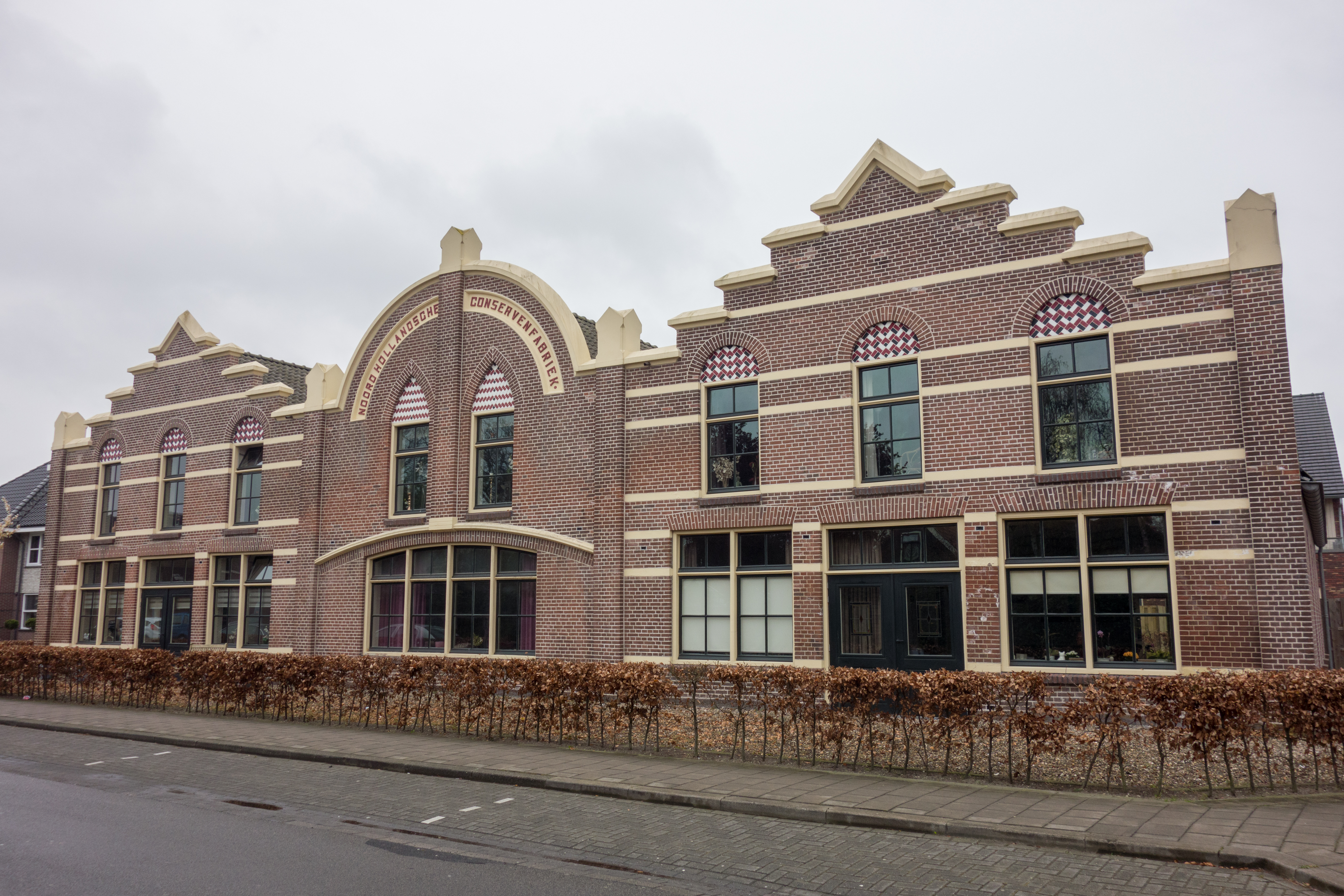
Former canning factory

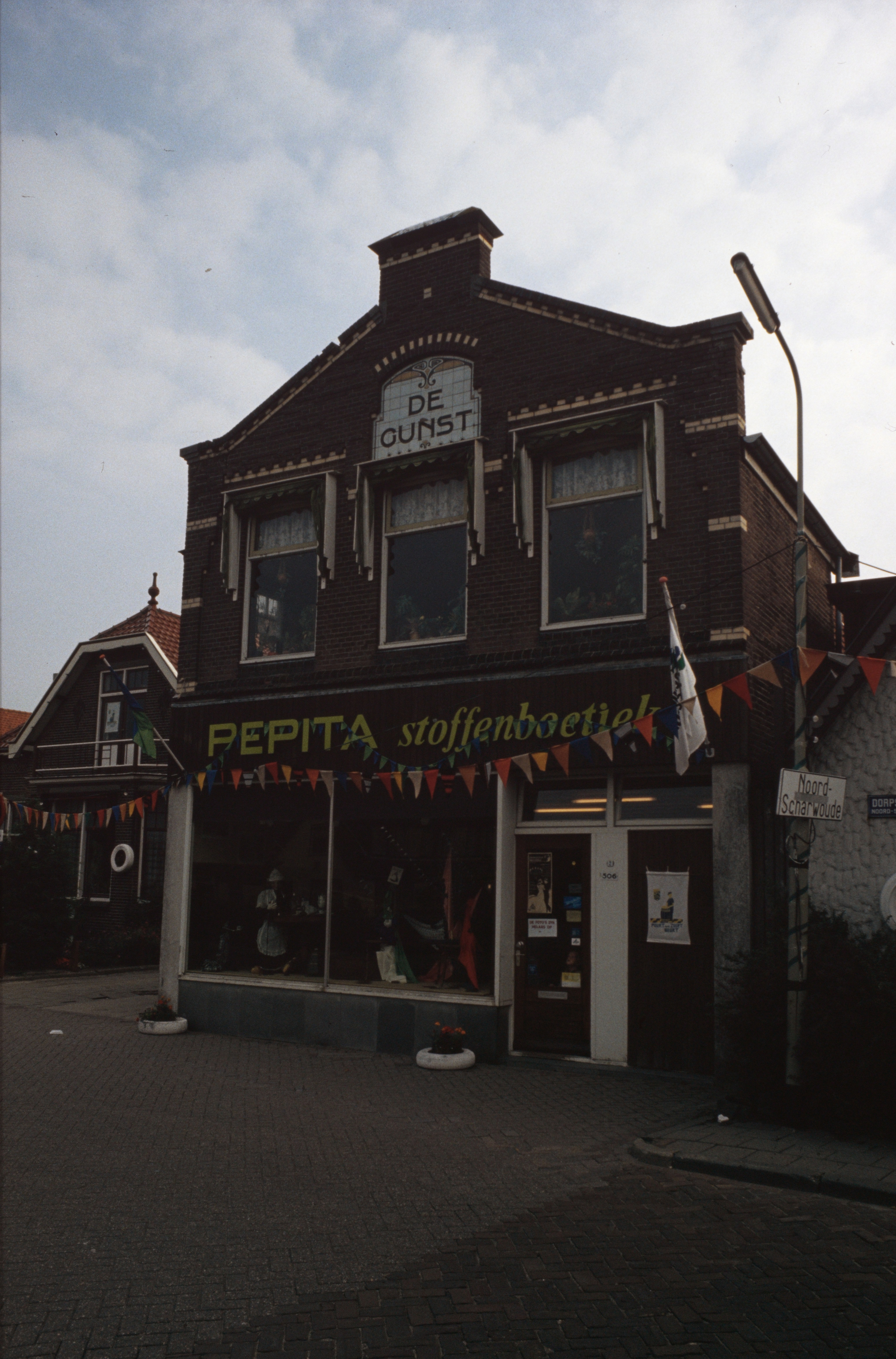
Shop in Noord-Scharwoude

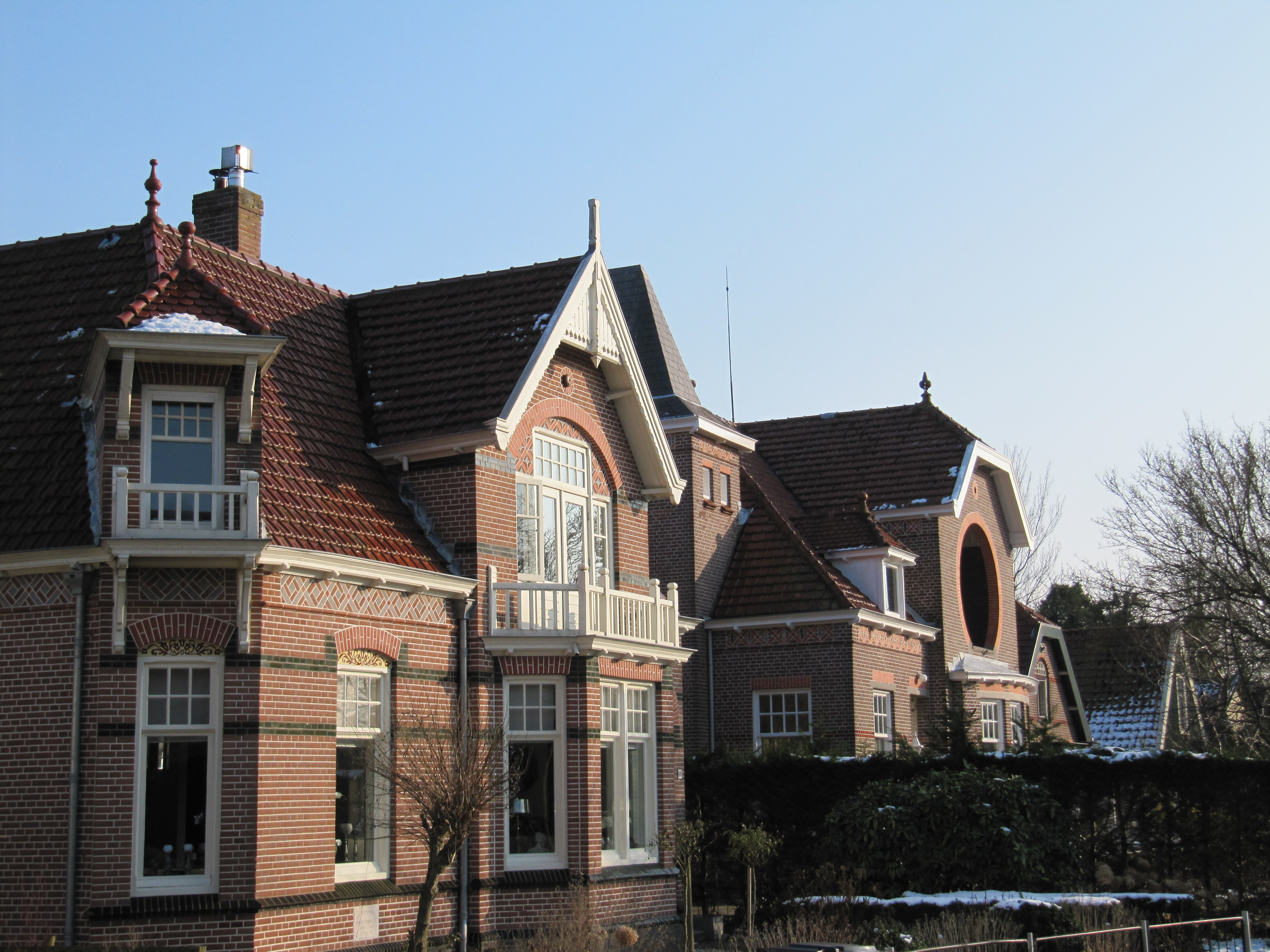
Houses in Noord-Scharwoude

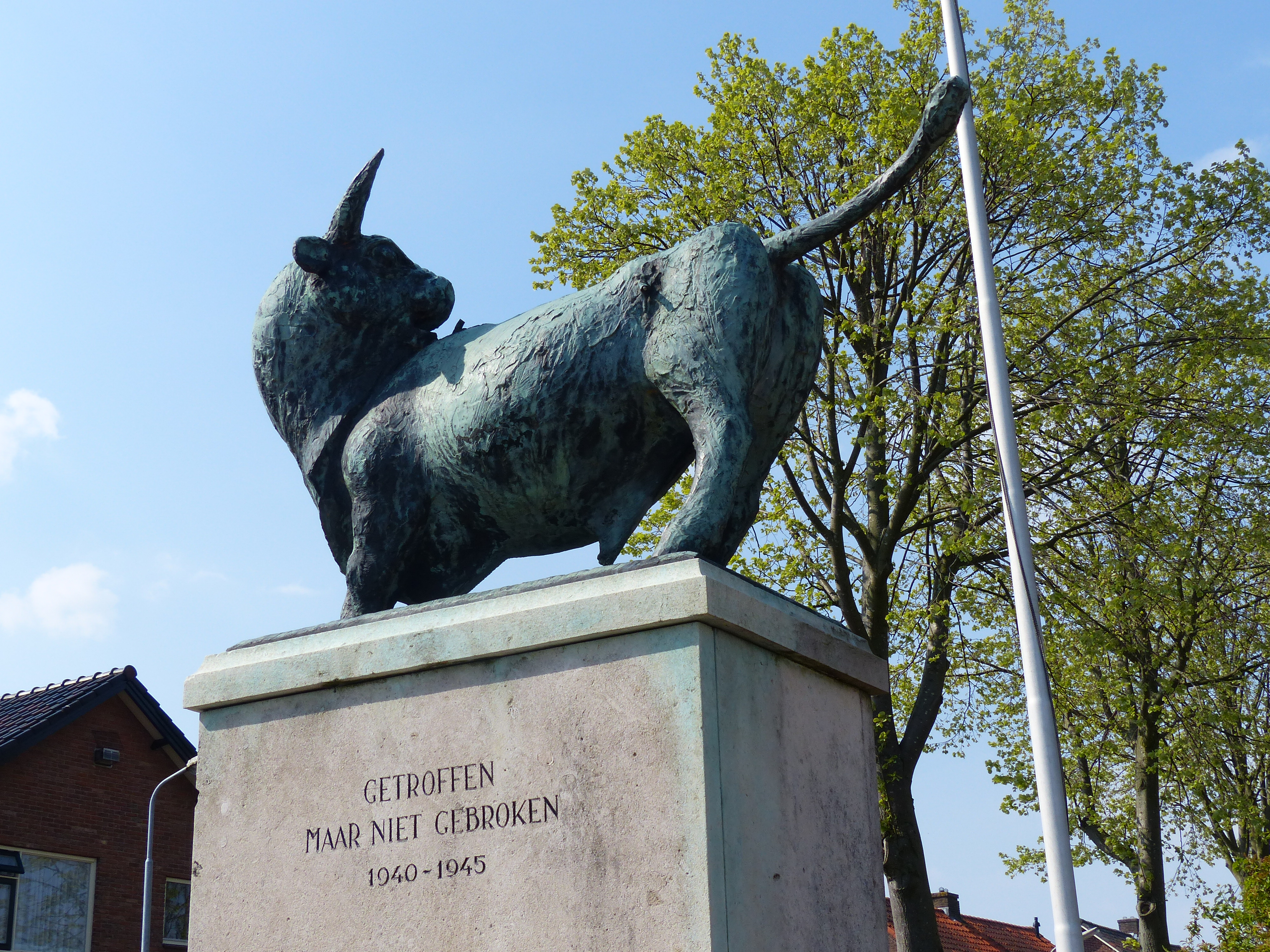
War memorial

== See also ==
- Scharwoude, Langendijk
