= Dijk en Waard =

- Municipality
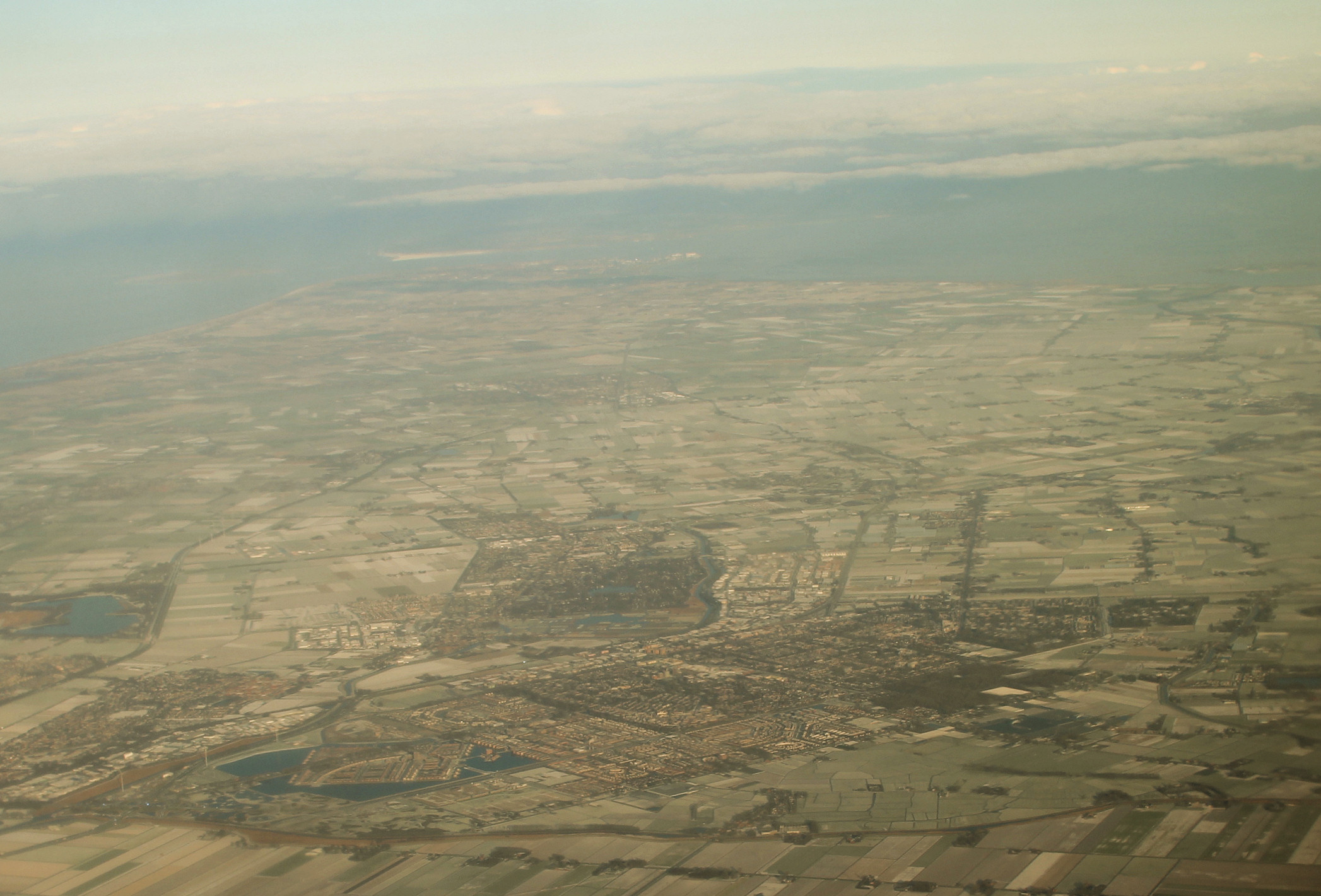
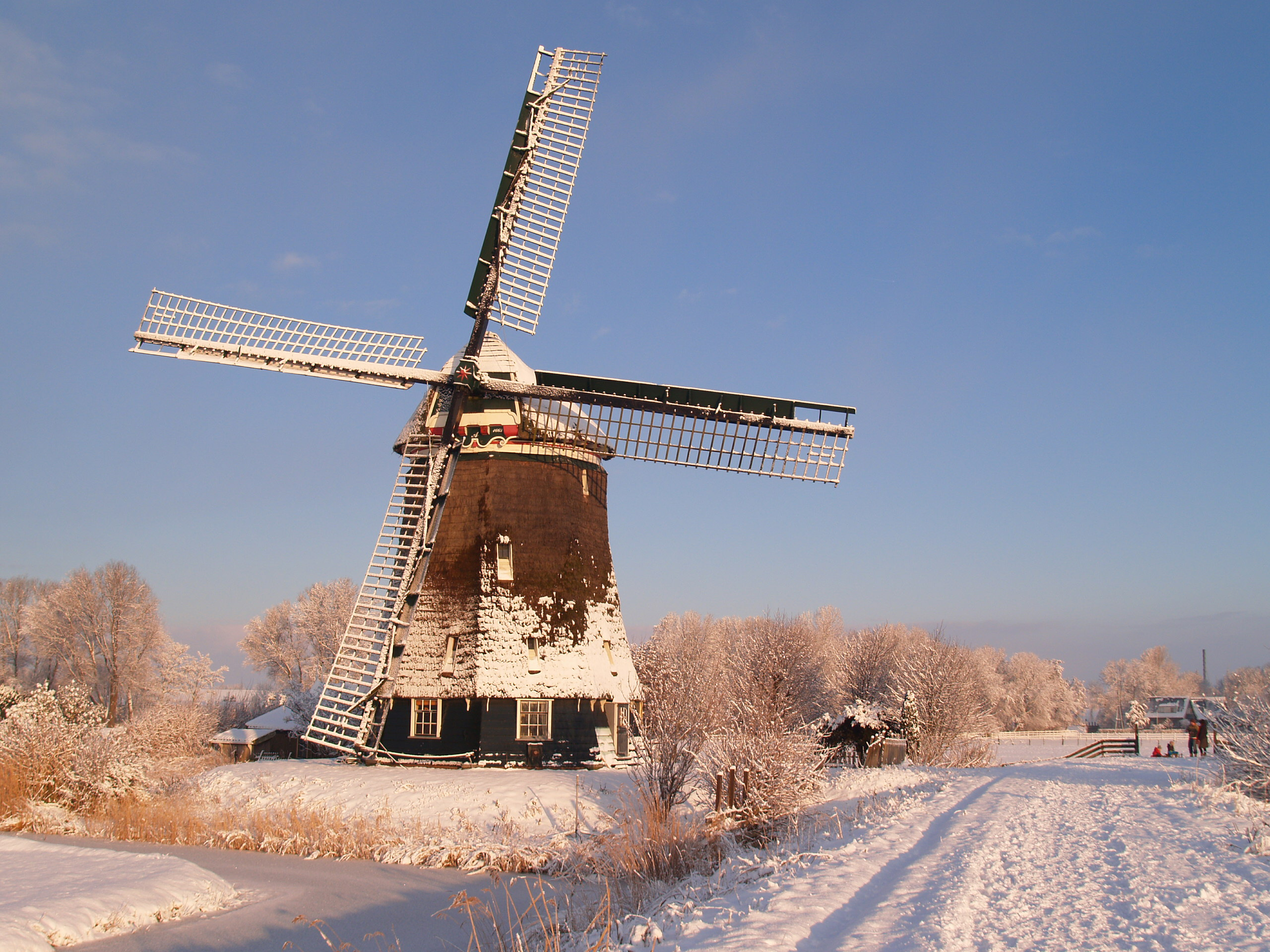
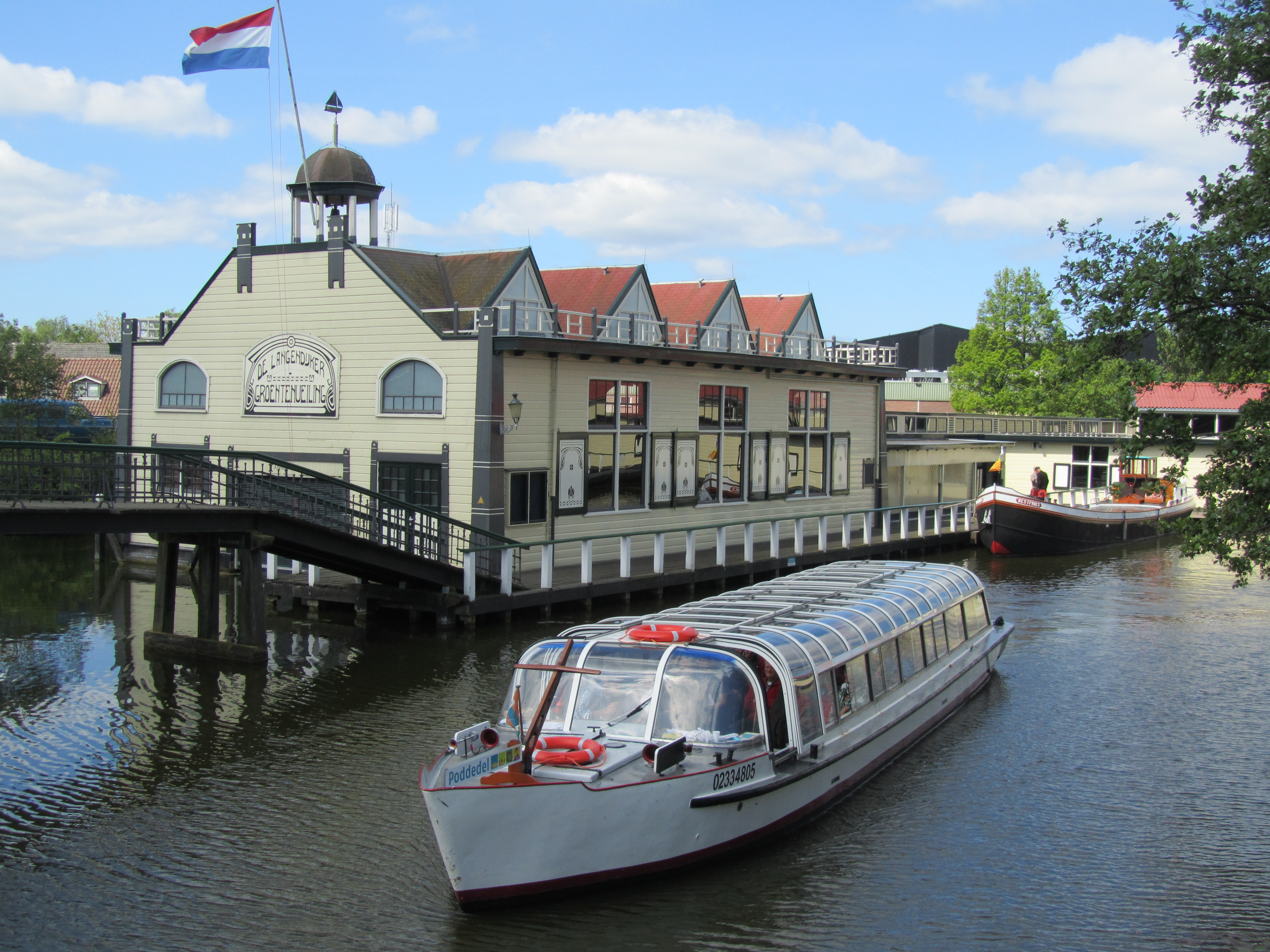
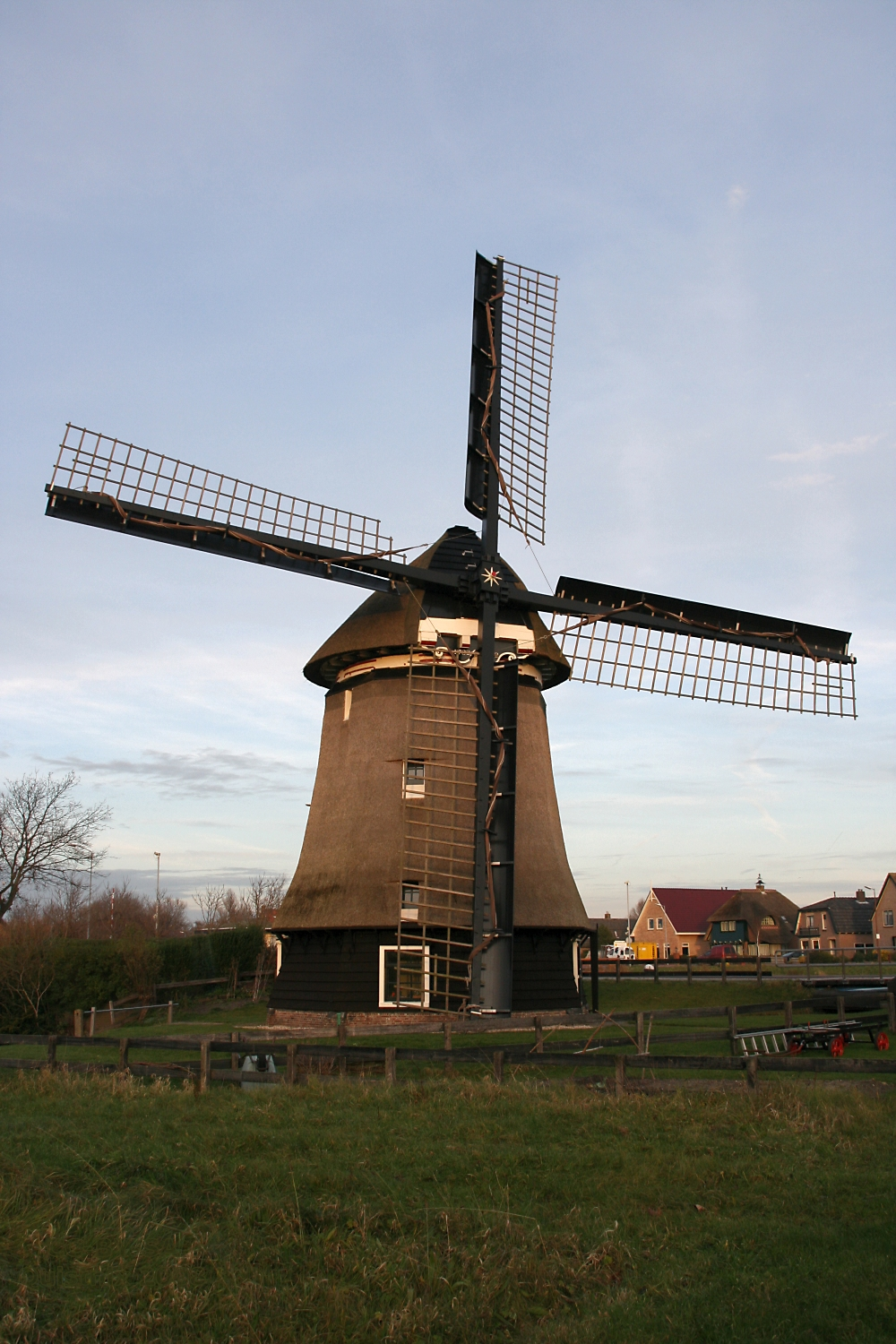
- Heerhugowaard Windmill in Sint Pancras Museum Broekerveiling Sluismolen in Koedijk

- Flag Coat of arms

- Location in North Holland
- Coordinates: 52°40′N 4°50′E
- Country: Netherlands
- Province: North Holland

Government
  - Body: Municipal council
  - Mayor: M.F. (Maarten) Poorter (PvdA)

Area
  - Total: 67.02 km^{2} (25.88 sq mi)
  - Land: 62.09 km^{2} (23.97 sq mi)
  - Water: 4.93 km^{2} (1.90 sq mi)
- Elevation: −1 m (−3.3 ft)
- Highest elevation: 7 m (23 ft)
- Lowest elevation: −4 m (−13 ft)

Population (2025)
  - Total: 90,747
  - Density: 1,430/km^{2} (3,700/sq mi)
- Time zone: UTC+1 (CET)
  - Summer (DST): UTC+2 (CEST)
- Postcode: 1700-1706, 1720-1724, 1830-1834
- Area code: 072, 0226
- Website: www.dijkenwaard.nl

Dijk en Waard (West Frisian Dutch: Doik en Weard/Weerd or Dìk en Weard/Weerd) is a municipality in the province of North Holland and the region of West-Frisia, the Netherlands. It was formed from the merger of Heerhugowaard and Langedijk on 1 January 2022.

== Geography ==
In 2022, the municipality had a population of approximately 87,000. It is bordered by Bergen to the west, Alkmaar to the south, Koggenland to the east, Opmeer to the northeast and Hollands Kroon and Schagen to the north. It consists of 16 main population centres, the largest of which is Heerhugowaard.

== Politics ==
The first elections for the municipality were held on 24 November 2021. The regular municipal elections of March 2022 were not held in Dijk en Waard, with a new vote taking place as part of the March 2026 Dutch municipal elections, when the following were elected:

- Lokaal Dijk en Waard – 7 seats
- Dijk&Waardse Independent Party (Dijk&Waardse Onafhankelijke Partij) – 4 seats
- VVD – 5 seats
- GroenLinks / PvdA – 4 seats
- FvD – 3 seats
- Senioren Dijk en Waard – 3 seats
- D66 – 3 seats
- Beter voor Dijk en Waard – 3 seats
- CDA – 2 seats
- 50Plus – 2 seats
- ChristenUnie – 1 seat

Peter Rehwinkel became acting mayor of the new municipality on 1 January 2022, with the appointment of M.F. (Maarten) Poorter on 13 July 2022.
