= Siege of Riga (1812) =

Siege during the French invasion of Russia (1812)

- Part of the French invasion of Russia
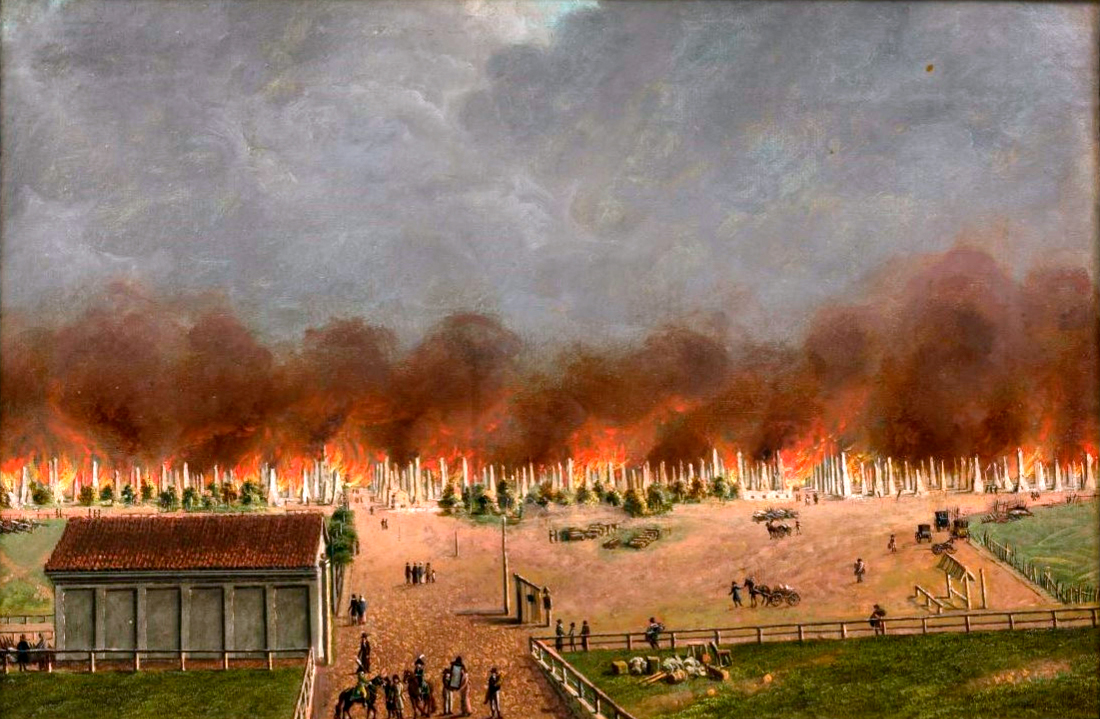
- Siege of Riga depicted in a painting by de:Carl Traugott Fechhelm.
Date	24 July – 18 December 1812
Location	Riga, Governorate of Livonia, Russian Empire 56°57′N 24°6′E
Result	Anglo-Russian victory

Belligerents
(First French Empire) French Empire; Prussia	Russian Empire; United Kingdom

Commanders and leaders
(First French Empire) Jacques MacDonald (Kingdom of Prussia) Julius von Grawert (Kingdom of Prussia) Ludwig von Yorck	(Russian Empire) Magnus G. von Essen (Russian Empire) Filippo Paulucci (Russian Empire) Ivan F. Emme (United Kingdom of Great Britain and Ireland) Thomas Byam Martin

Units involved
X Corps	Garrison of Riga; Army of Finland

Strength
31,000 men and 130 siege guns	27,000

French invasion of Russia
current battle
Prussian corps
Napoleon
Austrian corps

The siege of Riga was a military operation during the Napoleonic Wars. The siege lasted five months from July – December 1812, during which the left flank of Napoleon's "Great Army" (La Grande Armée) tried to gain a favorable position for an attack on Russian-controlled port city Riga, the capital of the Governorate of Livonia. They failed to cross the Daugava River, and accordingly the siege was not carried out completely.

== Background ==
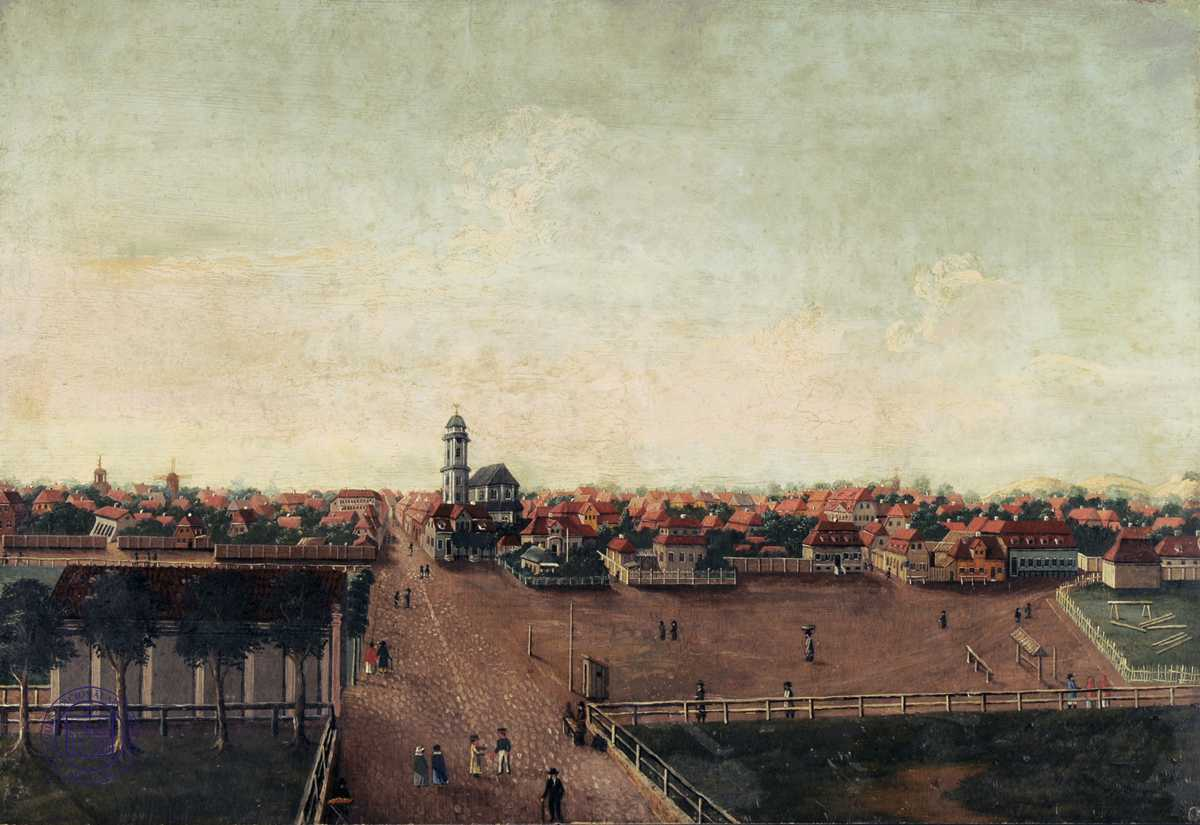
Peterburg neighborhood of Riga before burning (1812)

During Emperor Napoleon's Invasion of Russia, two corps were sent to towards the Baltic Sea via Courland and Lithuania in-order to secure his northern flank. One of the corps, Marshal Étienne MacDonald's X Corps was sent towards the Courland and subsequently began moving towards Riga.

By mid July 1812, the Riga garrison had grown to around 14,000 troops. The Russian Army of Finland commanded by Fabian Steinheil arrived with a further 10,000 troops shortly after the beginning of the siege.

After the beginning of the siege, the French situation was precarious as Marshal MacDonald's 25,000 troops had to not only continue the siege, but control some 80 miles of the Daugava up to Dünaburg. This was further undermined as the 'allied' Prussian forces loyalty was increasingly dubious.

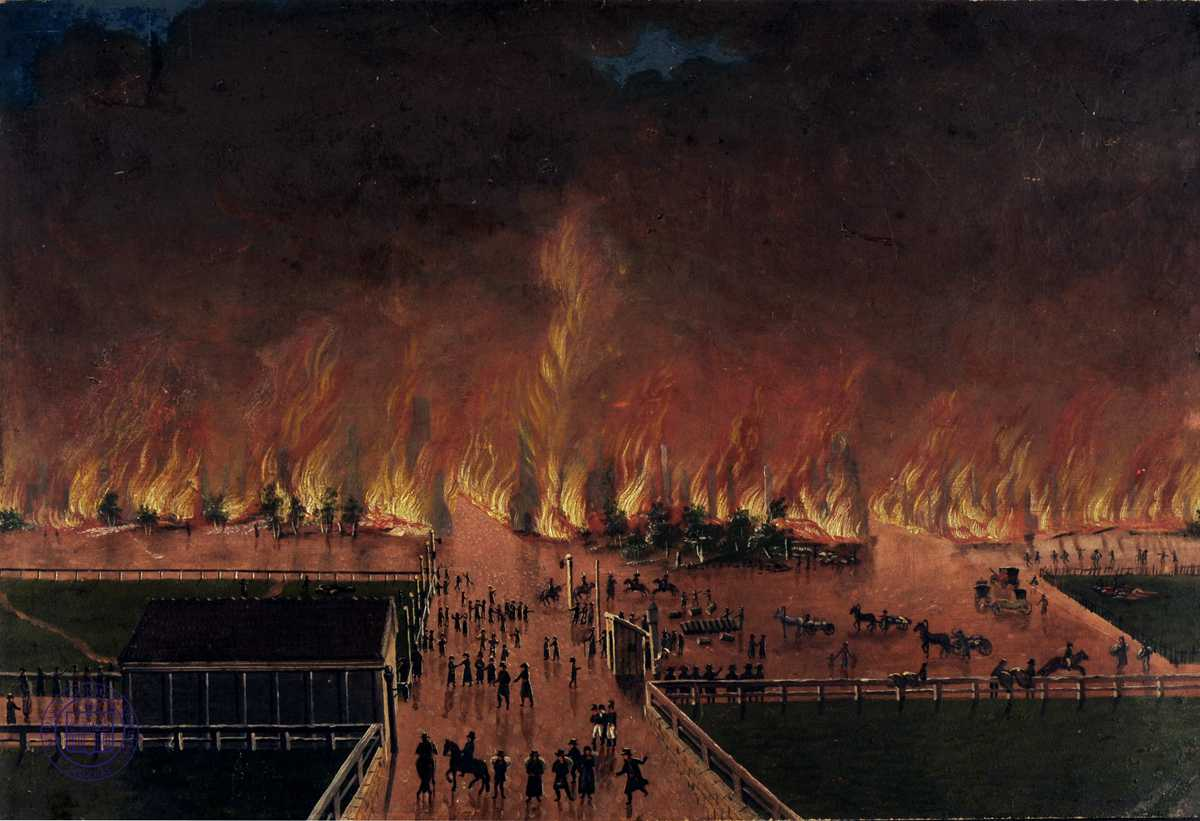
Buildings on fire during Siege of Riga (1812)

== Events ==
On July 7 the Battle of Iecava took place, in which the troops commanded by Prussian General Julius von Grawert, who approached Riga, defeated the forces of General Friedrich von Löwis of Menar. Governor-General Magnus Gustav von Essen, overestimating his opponent's options, ordered preparations for the siege and the burning of the suburbs, after doubt and cancellation—including those on the right bank. Commandant Ivan Emme announced the partial destruction of the Moscow and St. Petersburg (German: Petersburger Vorstadt) suburbs, and on the evening of July 11, police were ordered to start the arson. The fire, wind and poor organization spiraled out of control, causing even more damage to the townspeople than planned.

On July 19, 67 Russian gunboats finally arrived in Riga, much more than those made by Thomas Byam Martin. At that time, the Prussians were located around Riga in the southern semicircle along the line Sloka – Olaine – Kekava. Löwis of Menar's forces launched a counterattack in a western direction, and the Russian and British warships supporting it, moving up the Lielupe River, managed to reach Sloka and further Kalnciems. The boats moved on to Jelgava, which was shelled but retreated from it as a result of the Prussian artillery response fire. However, after a few days, the Prussians were able to push the Russians back from the captured territory.

On August 10 the Russians, after hoax attacks in the directions of Sloka and Olaine, attacked Kekava, forcing opponents to retreat to the south. On August 26 (September 7), the Prussians launched a counterattack and the Russians, in turn, retreated to the starting positions.

Jacques Macdonald, who was based in Dünaburg (Daugavpils) and, despite Napoleon's orders, had carried out very few activities from there; he transferred to Jēkabpils Ginenbein's brigade from the French 7th Division, which was to help take Riga. 130 heavy ("siege") cannons were placed in Pilsrundāle. But at the time, Napoleon himself called on Maconald not to rush, hoping for peace talks that were never launched.

On August 9, 1812, Martin, having decided that his further presence in Riga was not necessary, received permission to leave, but before that he took the British and Russian navies in a raid to the port of Danzig. They managed to create such panic that Maconald had to send some of his strength from Daugavpils to Danzig to calm his minds.

On September 10 the 10,000-strong Steinheil Corps arrived in Riga from Helsinki and was ordered to help the Riga garrison throw the enemy away from the vicinity of the city and destroy the siege cannons. Now the balance of power had changed for the Russians (22-25 thousand to 17) and they launched an attack in the direction of Pilsrundale, but Steinheil failed to find a common language with Essen, for whom it seemed more important to liberate Jelgava, and the Rosean Regiment and Steinheil's forces sent by Essen went in different directions.

On September 14 (26) Steinheil crushed a group of Prussian troops commanded by Horne, and Yorck von Wartenburg, who protected Jelgava, decided to withdraw from it without fighting and joined the Pilsrundale group, fearing siege. Rosen, having captured the city, also seized its arsenal of numerous war materials, which convinced Essen of the correctness of his actions and allowed him to solemnly come to the city the next day. Essen ordered Steinheil to send a few more regiments (3,000 men) to Jelgava for the guard of the loot. All this delayed and weakened Steinheil while the Prussians actively prepared for the battles around Pilsrundale. Belgard's regiment sent by Steinheil, with the task of forsaken through the brass Lielupe and tying the Prussian left wing at Gravendhall, collided with fierce resistance; Yorck von Wartenburg used the excitement and fatigue of Russian forces, moved on to attack and forced Steinheil to retreat towards Jelgava as a result of the Battle of Mezotne (Mesoten). Jelgava was not held either: Essen fled from it without waiting for Steinheil, and the city was occupied by the Prussians.

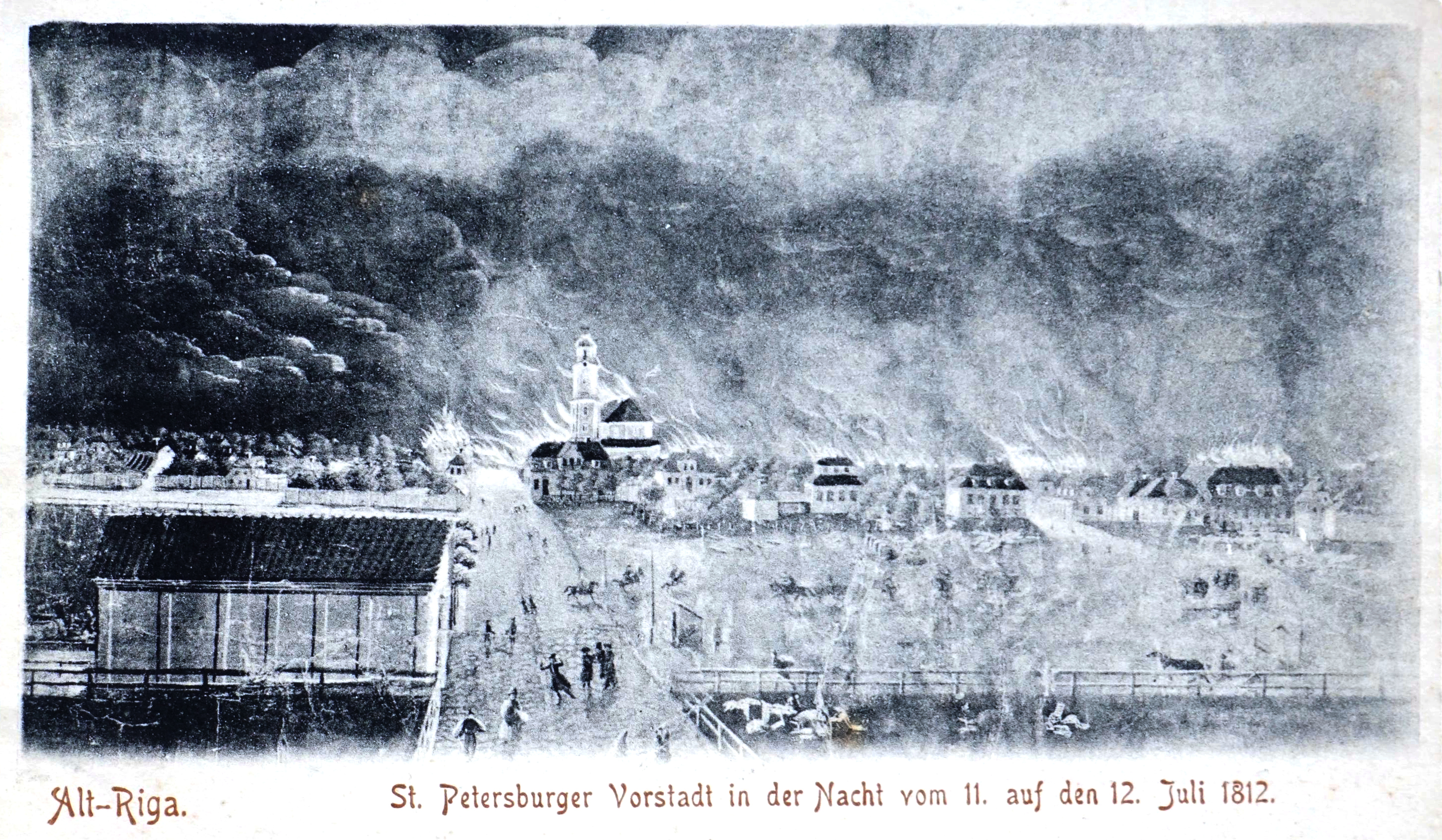
Siege of Riga depicted in a postcard

In mid-October, the Russians tried to carry out attacks in the direction of Ķekava and along the Lielupe River, but the Prussians managed to hold their recovered positions.

Russian military failures led to organizational changes. On October 14 (26) Essen was replaced with Filippo Paulucci and the Steinheil Corps was subjected to Peter Wittgenstein, who was successfully fighting in the Polotsk neighborhood at the time.

The regiments driving Macdonald from the east to Riga, meanwhile, succeeded. On November 1, Günerbein captured Tome, taking 9 Russian officers and 130 soldiers prisoners. The next day, Masenbach scored the same victory in Jaunjelgava. A cold autumn began, and in Riga they began to worry that after the Daugava was frozen, the Prussian forces south of Riga would no longer have natural obstacles to achieving it, and were preparing for winter protection. Some gunboats were even frozen in the ice of the Daugava River. But on December 8 Prussian forces, on Macdonald's orders, following the example of the entire Napoleon Great Army, began to withdraw from Russia.

== Consequences ==
The consequence of these battles was the economic devastation caused by the requisitions carried out by both armies and the burning of part of Riga. At that time, the progressive or radical ideas that the French brought to parts of Europe with their occupation did not reach Latvia in this way.

A monument was erected in Riga in 1913 for Barclay de Tolly. In 1915 the monument was evacuated from the city due to war and lost at sea, but in 2002 it was restored. Essen died in Baldone sulphur spring on August 11, 1813; there is an unconfirmed version of suicide as a result of depression (from both drowning and shooting).

=== In Riga ===
On July 12, 1812, part of Riga was burned down, including Moscow and St. Petersburg vorstadt. At least 4 churches, 36 warehouses, 35 state and 705 residential buildings, and other unconfirmed buildings were also burned down.

== Order of Battle ==
The order of battle of the forces involved was as follows (note: the nation of origin is listed behind units which came from said areas (other than French/Prussian/Russian)):

=== French X Corps ===
French X Corps
- (France) X Corps, commanded by Marshal Étienne MacDonald
  - 7th Division, commanded by Divisional General Charles Louis Dieudonné Grandjean
    - Life Hussar Regiment Nr. 1 (Kingdom of Prussia) [4 × squadrons]
    - (Poland) 2 × Horse Artillery Batteries (Duchy of Warsaw) [each of 4 × 6-pounder field cannons and 2 × 5.5-inch howitzers]
    - Ricard's Brigade, commanded by Brigade General Étienne Pierre Sylvestre Ricard
      - 13th Infantry Regiment (Kingdom of Bavaria) [2 × battalions]
      - (Poland) 5th (Polish) Infantry Regiment (Duchy of Warsaw) [4 × battalions]
    - (Poland) Radziwill's Brigade, commanded by Brigade General Prince Dominik Radziwiłł
      - 10th (Polish) Infantry Regiment (Duchy of Warsaw) [4 × battalions]
    - Bachelu's Brigade, commanded by Brigade General Gilbert Bachelu
      - 1st Infantry Regiment (Kingdom of Westphalia) [2 × battalions]
      - (Poland) 11th (Polish) Infantry Regiment (Duchy of Warsaw) [4 × battalions]
  - Prussian Corps (division sized despite name, all from the Kingdom of Prussia), commanded by Lieutenant General Johann Ludwig Graf von Yorck
    - Füsilier Battalion Nr. 3
    - Avantgarde, commanded by Brigade General Ferdinand Wilhelm von Jeanneret
      - 2nd Pomeranian Hussar Regiment Nr. 3 [4 × squadrons]
      - Brandenburg Dragoon Regiment Nr. 2 [4 × squadrons]
      - Füsilier Battalion Nr. 1
      - Füsilier Battalion Nr. 2
      - Füsilier Battalion Nr. 4
      - Füsilier Battalion Nr. 5
      - East Prussian Jäger Battalion
      - 2 × Horse Artillery Batteries
    - von Horn's Brigade, commanded by Colonel Heinrich Wilhelm von Horn
      - 1st Pomeranian Infantry Regiment Nr. 2 [2 × battalions]
      - 2nd East Prussian Infantry Regiment Nr. 3 [2 × battalions]
      - 3rd East Prussian Infantry Regiment Nr. 4 [2 × battalions]
      - 1 + 1/2 Foot Battery
    - von Raumer's Brigade, commanded by Colonel Eugen von Raumer
      - 4th East Prussian Infantry Regiment Nr. 5 [2 × battalions]
      - 1st West Prussian Infantry Regiment Nr. 6 [2 × battalions]
      - Füsilier Battalion Nr. 6
      - 2 × Foot Artillery Batteries
    - Reserve
      - 1st West Prussian Dragoon Regiment Nr. 1 [4 × squadrons]
      - 1 × Horse Artillery Battery
    - Coastal Detachment (guarding the Baltic coast)
      - 1st East Prussian Infantry Regiment Nr. 1 [2 × battalions]
      - Füsilier Battalion Nr. 7
      - 1 × Foot Artillery Battery

=== Russian Forces ===
==== Riga Garrison ====
Riga Garrison
- (Russia) Russian Riga Garrison (13,000 men), commanded by Military Governor of Riga, Lieutenant General Magnus Gustav von Essen
  - Riga Fortress Artillery Company
  - 25th Division, commanded by Military Governor of Riga, Lieutenant General Magnus Gustav von Essen
    - Cavalry Brigade
      - Chevalier Guard Regiment [4 × squadrons]
      - Life Guards of Horse Regiment [4 × squadrons]
      - Pskov Cuirassier Regiment [4 × squadrons]
      - Lithuanian Dragoon Regiment [4 × squadrons]
    - Infantry Brigade
      - Woronesch Musketeer Regiment [3 × battalions]
      - 1st Naval (Marine) Regiment [3 × battalions]
      - 2nd Naval (Marine) Regiment [3 × battalions]
      - 3rd Naval (Marine) Regiment [3 × battalions]
      - 31st Jäger Regiment [3 × battalions]
      - 47th Jäger Regiment [3 × battalions]
    - 25th Field Artillery Brigade (36 × total field guns)
      - 49th Foot Artillery Battery (12 × guns)
      - 25th Position Battery (6 × guns)
      - 50th Horse Artillery Battery

Russian Reinforcements

==== Reinforcements/Other Forces ====
- Army of Finland (10,000 men), commanded by Lieutenant General Count Fabian Gotthard von Steinheil
  - 6th Division, commanded by Major General Rachmanov
    - Azov Musketeer Regiment [2 × battalions]
    - Nizov Musketeer Regiment [2 × battalions]
    - Uglitsch Musketeer Regiment [2 × battalions]
    - 3rd Jäger Regiment [2 × battalions]
    - 35th Jäger Regiment [2 × battalions]
  - 21st Division, commanded by Major General Alexejev
    - Cavalry Brigade
      - Finnish Dragoon Regiment [3 × squadrons]
      - Loschtschilin's Cossack Regiment [4 × squadrons]
    - Infantry Brigade
      - Neva Musketeer Regiment [3 × battalions]
      - Petrovsk Musketeer Regiment [3 × battalions]
      - Lithuanian Musketeer Regiment [3 × battalions]
      - Podolia Musketeer Regiment [3 × battalions]
      - 2nd Jäger Regiment [3 × battalions]
    - 21st Artillery Brigade
      - 40th Foot Artillery Battery (12 × guns)
      - 21st Position Battery (6 × guns)
- General Löwis' Corps (2,000 men), commanded by Major General Friedrich von Löwis of Menar
  - Seliwanov's Cossack Regiment [4 × squadrons]
  - 4th Jäger Regiment [2 × dépôt battalions]
  - 20th Jäger Regiment [2 × dépôt battalions]
  - 21st Jäger Regiment [2 × dépôt battalions]
  - 1 × Foot Artillery Battery
- Åland Defence Forces
  - Bryansk Musketeer Regiment [3 × battalions] (detached from 6th Division, Army of Finland)
  - 44th Jäger Regiment [3 × battalions] (detached from 21st Division, Army of Finland)

=== British Baltic Fleet ===
British Baltic Fleet
- (United Kingdom) Baltic Fleet
  - Thomas Martin's Baltic Squadron, commanded by Rear Admiral Thomas Byam Martin
    - 74-gun Carnatic-class third-rate ship of the line: HMS Aboukir (flagship)
    - 64-gun Fourth-rate ship of the line: HMS Ardent
    - 46-gun La Résistance-class fifth-rate frigate: HMS Fisgard
    - 38-gun Lively-class fifth-rate frigate: HMS Crescent
    - 36-gun Ethalion-class fifth-rate frigate: HMS Ethalion
    - 36-gun Pyramus-class fifth-rate frigate: HMS Pyramus
    - 36-gun Fifth-rate frigate: HMS Hamadryad
    - 36-gun Hermione-class fifth-rate frigate: HMS Aquilon
    - 22-gun Sixth-rate frigate: HMS Helder
    - 22-gun Banterer-class post ship: HMS Daphne
    - 18-gun Cruizer-class brig-sloop: HMS Belette, HMS Raleigh
    - 18-gun Bittern-class sloop: HMS Plover
    - 14-gun La Brave-class brig-sloop: HMS Insolent
    - 7 × Gunboats

== In popular culture ==
- The Commodore by C.S. Forester includes a fictional account of the siege.

== See also ==
- List of battles of the French invasion of Russia
