= Battle of Ekau =

1812 battle during the French invasion of Russia in modern-day Latvia

Battle of Ekau (Iecava)
- Part of the French invasion of Russia
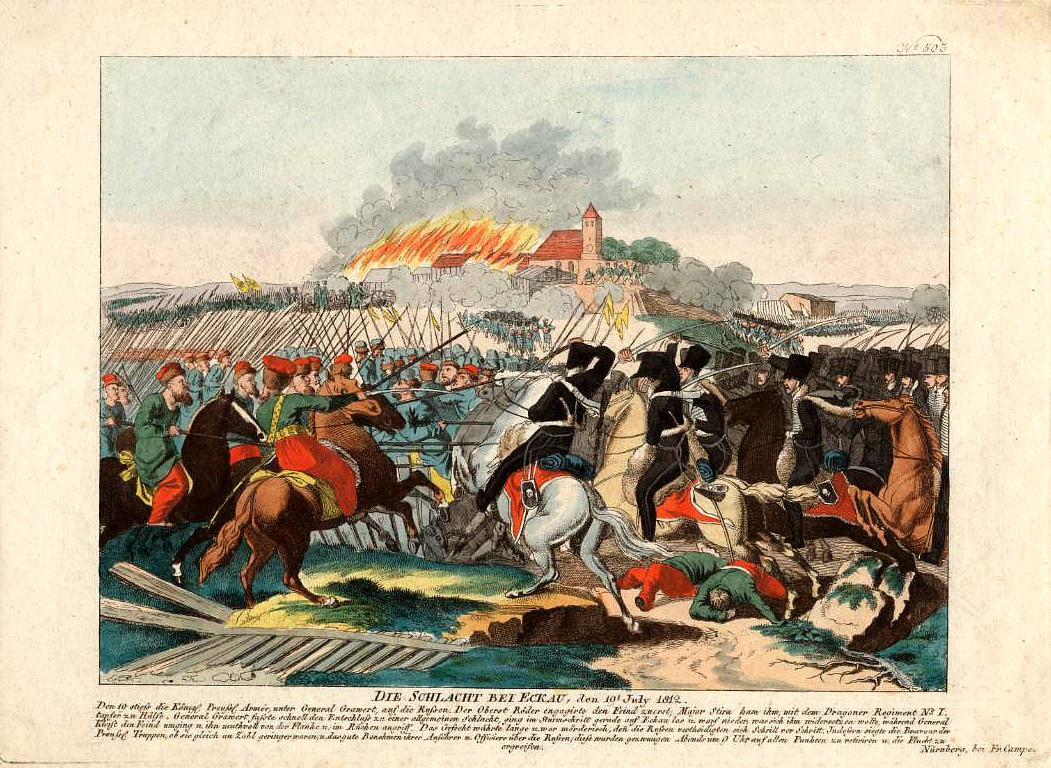
- The Battle of Eckau on 19 July 1812. Painting by August Friedrich Andreas Campe
| Date | 19 July 1812 |
| Location | Ekau (Iecava), Russian Empire 56°36′N 24°12′E |
| Result | French victory |

Belligerents
| Russian Empire | (First French Empire) French Empire: Prussia |

Commanders and leaders
| (Russian Empire) Friedrich von Löwis | (Kingdom of Prussia) Julius von Grawert (Kingdom of Prussia) Friedrich Graf Kleist von Nollendorf |

Strength
| 3,000–4,000 men 10 guns | 7,000 men 32 guns |

Casualties and losses
| 600 killed, wounded and missing, 300 captured | Minimal |

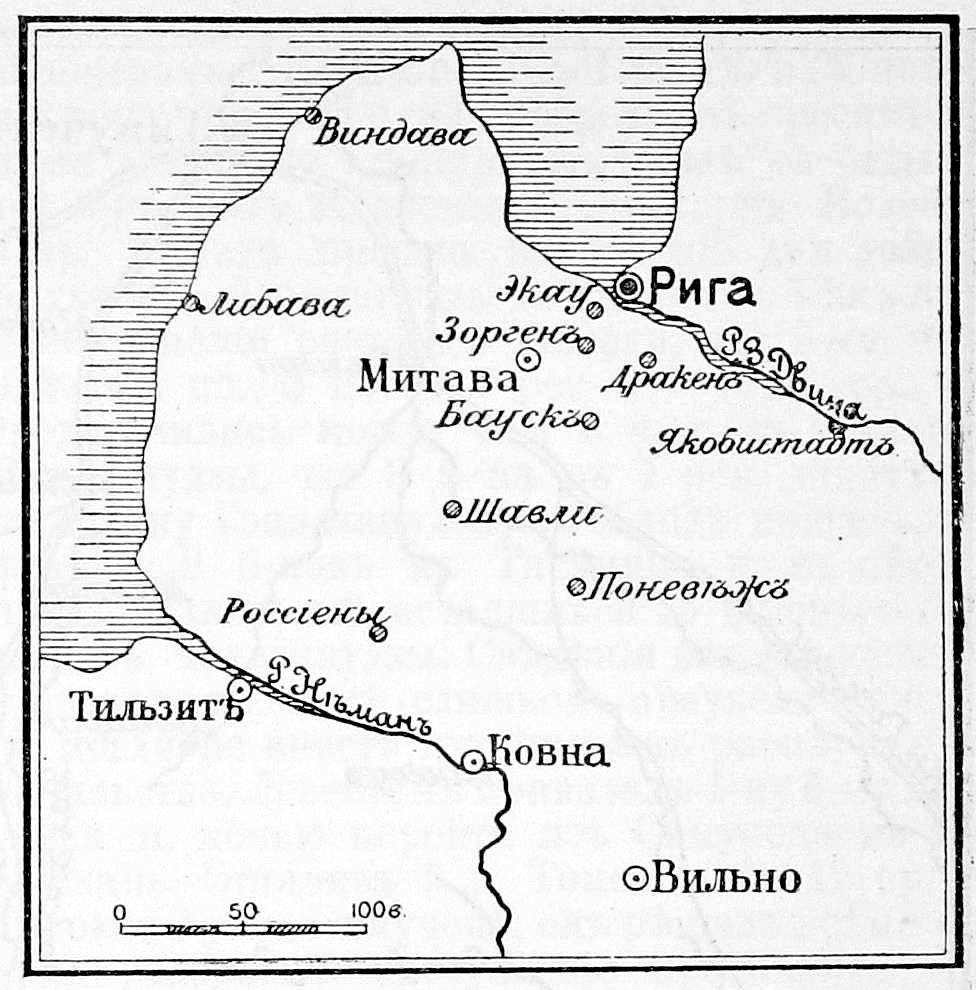
Theater of military operations

French invasion of Russia
current battle
Prussian corps
Napoleon
Austrian corps

The Battle of Ekau (also the Battle of Iecava) took place during the initial phase of the French invasion of Russia. Napoleon's troops from the X Corps of Marshal MacDonald, who had the advantage, defeated the troops of Alexander I defending under the command of General Friedrich von Löwis of Menar.

== Prelude ==
On the morning of 18 July, General Löwis, commander of the Russian forces in Mitau, received news of the occupation of Bauska by the 27th Prussian Division of General Grawert. General Löwis, aiming to prevent the movement of the Napoleonic armada to Riga, took the position at the castle of Ekau (Iecava). In turn, General Grawert made known to General Kleist, who was with his forces to the east, about the impending case. Emperor Alexander I, who was all the time at the 1st Western army, together with his retinue left for St. Petersburg on the night of 19 July.

== Battle ==
On the morning of 19 July, General Grawert began an artillery attack. Then he sent Westphalian cuirassiers to attack Russian positions. The situation remained stable until the evening, when the approaching troops of General Kleist struck on the positions of Löwis from the east. This decided the outcome of the case.

== Aftermath ==
The strategic importance of the battle was reduced to the fact that the selected troops of Löwis, intended to protect Riga, were defeated. This forced the Russian forces to leave the entire left bank of the Western Dvina and, as a preventive measure, to burn the Mitau suburb of Riga.

== Legacy ==
In connection with the 195th anniversary of the battle, the military historical clubs of Latvia, Russia, Poland and Lithuania conducted a costumed staging of the battle. In 2012, to the 200th anniversary of the battle, the Latvian Public Jubilee Committee commemorating the Patriotic War of 1812 in Riga published the book by Oleg Pukhlyak "The Battle of Gross Ekau".

== See also ==
- Siege of Riga (1812)
- List of battles of the French invasion of Russia

== Notes ==
| Preceded by Battle of Mir (1812) | Napoleonic Wars; Battle of Ekau | Succeeded by Battle of Salamanca |
