= X Corps (Grande Armée) =

French military unit during the Napoleonic Wars

- Active: 1807; 1812–1813
- Country: First French Empire
- Branch: French Imperial Army
- Size: Corps
- Part of: Grande Armée
- Engagements: War of the Fourth Coalition; Russian campaign; War of the Sixth Coalition

Commanders
- Notable commanders: François Joseph Lefebvre; Jacques MacDonald; Jean Rapp

The X Corps of the Grande Armée (Grand Army) was a French military formation during the Napoleonic Wars. It was formed in 1807 during the War of the Fourth Coalition under Marshal François Joseph Lefebvre and was later reconstituted for the French invasion of Russia under Marshal Jacques-Étienne Macdonald.

During the 1812 campaign against the Russian Empire, the X Corps included a Prussian contingent. In December of 1812, following the Convention of Tauroggen, this contingent defected, which reduced the corps' strength. The corps' Prussian troops subsequently formed the nucleus of the reconstituted Prussian Army in 1813.

== Campaigns ==
=== French Invasion of Russia ===
Under Étienne Macdonald's command, the X Corps was tasked with securing the northern flank by advancing into Courland and besieging Riga. The corps crossed the Neman River on 24 June 1812, but did not capture the city during the campaign.

=== German Campaign of 1813 ===
After the retreat from Russia, the X Corps moved to defend Danzig under General Jean Rapp, while dealing with logistics issues and disease. The Siege of Danzig lasted from January 1813 to January 1814 and resulted in the surrender of the French garrison.

== Order of battle ==
=== Russia, 1812 ===
| Corps Commander | Chief of Staff | Chief, Artillery | Chief, Engineers | Aides-de-Camp |
|---|---|---|---|---|
| Marshal Étienne Macdonald | Adjutant Commander Jacques Terrier | Division General Albert Taviel | Division General Jacques de Campredon; CdB Jean de Beaulieu | Squadron Chief Seguier; Capt. Garola; Capt. Jules J.-G. de Tamney; Capt. M. de Beurnonville |

=== 7th Division ===
| Commander | Chief of Staff | Chief, Artillery | Adjutant | Chief, Engineers | Inspecteur aux revues | Aide de Camp |
|---|---|---|---|---|---|---|
| Division General Charles Grandjean | Plk. Jozef Nowicki | CdB Farjon | Capt. Louis Chapuis | Capt., 1st Class Roger-P-M-A de Riencourt | Sr. Inspecteur aux revue Reybaud (Rayband) | CdB Theodore Meynier; Capt. Perrin (Perin); Lt. Maisonneuve |

| 1st Brigade | Commander: Général de Brigade Étienne Pierre Sylvestre Ricard | | | | | |
| 1st Brigade | 5th Polish Line Regt | Commander: Plk. Stefan Oskierko | | | | |
| 1st Brigade | 5th Polish Line Regt | 1st Battalion | 2nd Battalion | 3rd Battalion | 4th Battalion | Artillery Regt |
| 1st Brigade | 5th Polish Line Regt | CdB Ludwik Kaminski | CdB Jan Godlewski | CdB Feliks Stokowski | Not present | Kapt. Ignacy Kulesza |
| 1st Brigade | 13th Bavarian Line Regt | Commander: Oberst Franz Baron Schlossberg | | | | |
| 1st Brigade | 13th Bavarian Line Regt | 1st Battalion | | 2nd Battalion | 1st Section, 2nd Bavarian | |
| 1st Brigade | 13th Bavarian Line Regt | Maj. Caspar Poyk (Poeck) | | Maj. Franz von Pillement | | Untilt. Alois Escher(t) II |
| 2nd Brigade | Commander: Général de Brigade Michal Radziwill; Aide-de-camp: Kapitan Antoni Niesiolowski | | | | | |
| 2nd Brigade | 10th Polish Line Regt | Commander: Polkovnik Henryk Kamienski | | | | |
| 2nd Brigade | 10th Polish Line Regt | 1st Battalion | 2nd Battalion | 3rd Battalion | 4th Battalion | Artillery Regt |
| 2nd Brigade | 10th Polish Line Regt | CdB Jan Krassin (Crassin, Krassyn) | CdB Franciszek Czyzewski | CdB Nicolas Joseph Daine | Not present | Kapt. Leneke |
| 3rd Brigade | Commander: Général de Brigade Gilbert Bachelu | | | | | |
| 3rd Brigade | 11th Polish Line Regt | Commander: Polkovnik Aleksander Chlebowski | | | | |
| 3rd Brigade | 11th Polish Line Regt | 1st Battalion | 2nd Battalion | 3rd Battalion | 4th Battalion | Artillery Regt |
| 3rd Brigade | 11th Polish Line Regt | CdB Piotr Szembeck | CdB Kazimierz Poniatowski | CdB Karol Jon(n)emann | Not present | Kapt. Ostrowski |
| 1st Westphalian Line Regiment | Commander: Colonel Georg Ferdinand Plesmann | | | | | |
| 1st Westphalian Line Regiment | 1st Battalion | | 2nd Battalion | | Artillery Regt | |
| 1st Westphalian Line Regiment | CdB Johann Philipp Bauer | | Capt. David von Kruse (later CdB) | | Kapt. von Haustein | |
| Division (Prussian) Cavalry (detached from 27th Division) | Commander: Oberst Karl F. von Hunerbein | | | | | |
| Division (Prussian) Cavalry (detached from 27th Division) | 1st Prussian Combined Hussar Regt | Regiment Commander: Major Dietrich C. G. von Cosel | | | | |
| Division (Prussian) Cavalry (detached from 27th Division) | 1st Prussian Combined Hussar Regt | 1st Leib Hussar Regt | | 2nd Leib Hussar Regt | | |
| Division (Prussian) Cavalry (detached from 27th Division) | 1st Prussian Combined Hussar Regt | 3rd Squadron | 4th Squadron | 2nd Squadron | | 3rd Squadron |
| Division (Prussian) Cavalry (detached from 27th Division) | 1st Prussian Combined Hussar Regt | Rittm. Karl Leopold F. Dallmer | Rittm. Meyer | Maj. von Kurnatowsky | | Rittm. Karl L. Zastrow |
| Division Artillery and Engineers | Commander: Unknown | | | | | |
| Division Artillery and Engineers | 6th Polish Foot Company | 1st Polish Horse Company | | Polish Garde d'Artie | | 4th Polish Sapper Company |
| Division Artillery and Engineers | Kapt. Turdeski | Kapt. Wladyslaw Ostrowski | | Detachment | | Kapt. Jozef Dobrzyński |
| Division Train | Commander: Unknown | | | | | |
| Division Train | 12th Battalion (in German) | | | 6th Train Company | | |
| Division Train | Unknown | | | S.-lieutenant Benoist (?) | | |

=== 27th (Prussian) Infantry Division ===
| Corps | Commander | 2nd in Command | Chief of Staff | Quartermaster | Chief Engineer | Adjutants |
|---|---|---|---|---|---|---|
| Prussian Mobile Corps | General d. Inf. Julius von Grawert | GenLt Ludwig Yorck | Obst. Friedrich E. von Roeder | Obstlt. Johann F. K. von Lossau (Genstab.) | Maj. Markoff | Maj. Anton F. F. von Seydlitz; Pr.-Lt. Friedrich von Brandenstein (Genstab.); Maj. Johann Alexander von Traubenfeld (Genstab.); Kapt. Wilhelm von Schack (Genstab.); Pr.-Lt. Lölhöffel von Löwensprung (Genstab.) |
| Prussian Infantry | GenMjr Friedrich Graf Kleist von Nollendorf | - | Maj. Ernst von Perbandt (Genstab.) | - | - | Maj. Johann F. W. von Schon; Maj. Alexander Heinrich von Thile II (Genstab.); Sec.-Lt. von Rudiger Genstab.) |
| Prussian Cavalry | GenLt Friedrich von Massenbach | - | - | - | - | Maj. Ludwig E. C. von Kyckpusch (Genstab.) |

Brigades
1st Brigade
| 1st Brigade | Commander: Oberst Hans Franz von Below; Adjutant: Stabs-Kapit. von Drygalski | | | | |
| 1st Brigade | Inftantry Regt Nr. 1 | Commander, 2nd East Prussian Regt: Major Friedrich Wilhelm von Sjöholm | | | |
| 1st Brigade | Inftantry Regt Nr. 1 | 1st East Prussian Infantry Regt | | 2nd East Prussian Infantry Regt | |
| 1st Brigade | Inftantry Regt Nr. 1 | Fusilier Battalion | II Battalion | I Battalion | |
| 1st Brigade | Inftantry Regt Nr. 1 | Maj. Christoph J. H. von Erammon | Maj. Carl von Kurnatowsky | Maj. Ludwig von Krauthof | |
| 1st Brigade | Inftantry Regt Nr. 2 | Commander, 3rd East Prussian Infantry Regt: Major Ludwig F. von Sjoholm II | | | |
| 1st Brigade | Inftantry Regt Nr. 2 | 3rd East Prussian Infantry Regt | | 4th East Prussian Infantry Regt | |
| 1st Brigade | Inftantry Regt Nr. 2 | I Battalion | | Fusilier Battalion | I Battalion |
| 1st Brigade | Inftantry Regt Nr. 2 | Maj. Karl R. W. von Beckedorff | | Maj. Johann F. von Pfeiffer | Maj. Julius von Lübtow |
| 1st Brigade | | Unknown | | | |
| 1st Brigade | | Fusilier Battalion | | | |
| 1st Brigade | | Unknown | | | |
| 1st Brigade | | 2nd East Prussian Regt | | | |
| 1st Brigade | | Fusilier Battalion | | | |
| 1st Brigade | | Maj. Friedrich W. von Funck | | | |
2nd Brigade
| 2nd Brigade | Commander: Oberstleutnant Heinrich Wilhelm von Horn; Adjutant: Stabskapitän August Wilhelm Graf von Kanitz | | | | |
| 2nd Brigade | Infantry Regt Nr. 3 | Commander, Colbergisches Infantry Regt: Major Karl F. F. von Steinmetz | | | |
| 2nd Brigade | Infantry Regt Nr. 3 | Colbergisches Infantry Regt | | 1st Pomeranian Infantry Regt | |
| 2nd Brigade | Infantry Regt Nr. 3 | I Battalion | | Fusilier Battalion | II Battalion |
| 2nd Brigade | Infantry Regt Nr. 3 | Maj. Friedrich W. von Quednow | | Maj. August Ferdinand von Borcke | Maj. Carl Ludwig Frhr. von Linsingen |
| 2nd Brigade | Infantry Regt Nr. 4 | Commander: Major Ernst Ludwig von Tippelskirch | | | |
| 2nd Brigade | Infantry Regt Nr. 4 | Leib-Grenadier-Regt | | | |
| 2nd Brigade | Infantry Regt Nr. 4 | Fusilier Battalion | I Battalion | II Battalion | |
| 2nd Brigade | Infantry Regt Nr. 4 | Maj. August Heinrich von Reuss | Maj. Konstantin G. L. von Zepelin; Maj. Friedrich Christoph von Oertzen | Maj. Julius Gustav Friedrich von Both | |
3rd Brigade
| 3rd Brigade | Commander: Oberst Eugen von Raumer; Adjutant: Major von Collrepp | | | | |
| 3rd Brigade | Infantry Regt Nr. 5 | Commander: Major Ludwig D. K. von Schmalensee | | | |
| 3rd Brigade | Infantry Regt Nr. 5 | 1st West Prussian Infantry Regt | | 2nd West Prussian Infantry Regt | |
| 3rd Brigade | Infantry Regt Nr. 5 | I Battalion | | Fusilier Battalion | I Battalion |
| 3rd Brigade | Infantry Regt Nr. 5 | Maj. von Imbrecht | | Maj. Julius L. von Rudolphi; Maj. Georg W. von Lettow | Maj. Friedrich E. von Loebell |
| 3rd Brigade | Infantry Regt Nr. 6 | Commander: Major Arwed K. von Carnall | | | |
| 3rd Brigade | Infantry Regt Nr. 6 | 1st Schlesisches Inft. Regt | | 2nd Schlesisches Inft. Regt | |
| 3rd Brigade | Infantry Regt Nr. 6 | Maj. von Happe | | Maj. Karl G. S. von Lessel | Maj. Karl Heinrich von Ziemietzi |
| 3rd Brigade | | East Prussian Jäger Battalion | | 1st Battery, Prussian Army | |
| 3rd Brigade | | Maj. Vollmar K. F. von Clausewitz | | Uffz. Staffehl (one 3-lbr) | |
| 1st Cavalry Brigade | Commander: Oberst Wilhelm Jeannert | | | | |
| 1st Cavalry Brigade | 1st Combined Dragoon Regt | Commander: Major Karl Alexander Wilhelm von Treskow | | | |
| 1st Cavalry Brigade | 1st Combined Dragoon Regt | 1st Lithuanian Dragoon Regt | | 2nd West Prussian Dragoon Regt | |
| 1st Cavalry Brigade | 1st Combined Dragoon Regt | 2nd Squadron | 4th Squadron | 1st Squadron | 2nd Squadron |
| 1st Cavalry Brigade | 1st Combined Dragoon Regt | Maj. von Kameke | Sgt. Rittm. Dresler | Maj. von Manstein | Maj. Friedrich Frhr. von Stiern |
| 1st Cavalry Brigade | 2nd West Prussian Dragoon Regt | Commander: Major Ernst T. von Eicke | | | |
| 1st Cavalry Brigade | 2nd West Prussian Combined Dragoon Regt | Commander: Oberstleutnant Alexander G. L. M. M. von Wahlen-Jürgass | | | |
| 1st Cavalry Brigade | 1st West Prussian Dragoon Regt | | | | |
| 1st Cavalry Brigade | 1st West Prussian Dragoon Regt | 1st Squadron | | 3rd Squadron | |
| 1st Cavalry Brigade | 1st West Prussian Dragoon Regt | Rittm. Karl Weiss | | Rittm. Ernst L. B. von Printz | |
| 1st Cavalry Brigade | 3rd Combined Hussar Regt | Commander: Major Ernst T. von Eicke | | | |
| 1st Cavalry Brigade | 3rd Combined Hussar Regt | 1st Schles. Hussar Regt | | 2nd Schles. Hussar Regt | |
| 1st Cavalry Brigade | 3rd Combined Hussar Regt | 1st Squadron | 3rd Squadron | 1st Squadron | 2nd Squadron |
| 1st Cavalry Brigade | 3rd Combined Hussar Regt | Sgt. Rittm. Friedrich A. Kehler | Sgt. Rittm. Muller | Maj. Johann H. von Schill | |

=== (Prussian) Corps Artillery ===
Brigades
Commander: Major Johann H. von Schmidt
| Foot Artillery | Commander: Major Johann Friedrich Wilhelm von Fiebig | | | | |
| Foot Artillery | Foot Battery No. 1 (6-pdr) | Foot Battery No. 2 (6-pdr) | Foot Battery No. 3 (6-pdr) | Foot Battery No. 4 (6-pdr) | Half Battery (12-pdr) |
| Foot Artillery | Pr.-Kapit. Huet | Stabs-Kapit. Wegner | Stabs-Kapit. Ziegler | Pr.-Kapit. Ludwig | Pr.-Kapit. von Roszynski |
| Horse Artillery | Major Gustav von Fiebig II | | | | |
| Horse Artillery | 1st Horse Battery | 2nd Horse Battery | | 3rd Horse Battery | |
| Horse Artillery | Stabs-Kapit. Johann K. L. von Zincken | Pr.-Kapit. Georg W. von Rentzell | | Pr.-Kapit. von Graumann | |
| Artillery Park | Unknown | | | | |
| Artillery Park | Park (Munitions) columns | | | | |
| Artillery Park | No. 1 | No. 2 | No. 3 | No. 4 | No. 5 |
| Artillery Park | Sec.-Lt. Schliew | Sec.-Lt. Herrmann | Prem.-Lt. Barenkampff | Pr.-Kapit. Meyer (4th Foot Co., Prussian Brigade) | Sec.-Lt. von Hertig I (8th Foot Co., Brand. Brig.) |
Bridging Column
| Bridging Column | Handwerk Columns | Commander, 2nd Foot Battery: Seconde-Lieutenant Lieben | | | |
| Bridging Column | Handwerk Columns | No. 1 | | No. 2 | |
| Bridging Column | Handwerk Columns | Unknown | | Unknown | |

=== Corps Train ===
Miners
| Miners | Unknown | | | | |
| Miners | 1st Battalion | | | 2nd Battalion | |
| Miners | 3rd Company | | 5th Company | 1st Company | |
| Miners | Unknown | | Unknown | Unknown | |
Sappers
| Sappers | Unknown | | | | |
| Sappers | 1st Battalion | Sapeurs de I'ile d'Elbe | | Prussian Sappers | |
| Sappers | 1st Battalion | 1st Company | 2nd Company | Marine Bataillion d'ouviers de l'Escaut | 17th equipage de flottille |
| Sappers | Unknown | Unknown | Unknown | Unknown | Unknown |
