= Ivan Fyodorovich Emme =

Russian lieutenant general (1763–1839)

- Born: 25 July 1763; Governorate of Livonia, Russian Empire
- Died: 12 September 1839 (aged 76) Moscow, Moscow Governorate, Russian Empire
- Buried: Vvedenskoye Cemetery, Moscow 55°46′8″N 37°42′25″E
- Allegiance: Russian Empire
- Branch: Imperial Russian Army
- Service years: 1776–1833
- Conflicts: Russo-Swedish War (1788–1790); Battle of Kyummen River; Battle of Partakoski; Napoleonic Wars; War of the Second Coalition; Anglo-Russian Invasion of Holland; Battle of Bergen op Zoom; Battle of Alkmaar; French Invasion of Russia; Siege of Riga; Siege of Danzig; Siege of Hamburg

Ivan Fyodorovich Emme (Russian: Иван Фёдорович Эмме; 1763–1839) was a Russian lieutenant general in the Napoleonic Wars.

== Early years ==
Ivan Fyodorovich Emme was born in the Governorate of Livonia as part of the Emme family on 25 July 1763 to Fyodor Ivanovich Emme.

== Military service ==
On 2 January 1776, Ivan entered the Land Gentry Cadet Corps and, after graduating from it on 14 March 1783, was commissioned as a lieutenant (Подпору́чик or Podporuchik) in the Tobolsk Musketeer Regiment.

Between 1788 and 1790, Ivan took part in the Russo-Swedish War. For distinguishing himself at the Battle of Kyummen River, he was awarded of Order of Saint Vladimir, 4th Degree with a bow. During the Battle of Partakoski, he was shot in the right side, with injuries to his right arm, and consequently promoted to lieutenant colonel (Подполко́вник or Podpolkovnik).

On 10 January 1797, Ivan was promoted to colonel (Полковник or Polkovnik) and appointed commander of the Ryazan Musketeer Regiment. On 16 July 1798, Ivan was transferred to the Sofia Musketeer Regiment, but only commanded it for little more than a month, as on 26 August he was promoted to Major General (Генерал Mайор or General Major) and appointed as regimental chief of the Pavlovsky Grenadier Regiment. During the Anglo-Russian invasion of Holland, he led hithe regiment during the initial landings. While attacking Batavian artillery positions near the city of Bergen op Zoom, he was once again wounded, in the right leg by a musket ball, but refused to leave his troops and continued on. At the Battle of Alkmaar Ivan was wounded for a third time, this time from a musket ball in his left hand.

After Russian forces withdrew after the Convention of Alkmaar, Ivan was ordered to retire on 8 April 1800 to recover from his wounds. On 14 November, he returned to service as a member of the highly esteemed Preobrazhensky Life Guards Regiment. On 4 March 1801, he was appointed regimental chief of the Vitebsk Musketeer Regiment, but the next day was dismissed for "... filling reports out of form". On 14 March 1801 however, he returned to service in the regiment. On 9 January 1802, he was appointed military commandant of Riga in the Governorate of Livonia, and on 28 September 1803 was made regimental chief of the Riga Garrison Regiment.

On 26 November 1809, Ivan was awarded the Order of Saint George, 4th Degree. In 1810 he became general officer of the 14th Infantry Division, and shortly thereafter became Commandant of the Riga Garrison Regiment once again.

In 1812, during the Siege of Riga, he supervised the construction of fortifications and was engaged throughout the siege in raising local militia forces within the city's vicinity. During the siege, Ivan was on the frontlines and regularly visited the combat positions and artillery batteries while under fire. For his bravery and distinction shown during the siege, he was awarded the Order of Saint Anna, 2nd Degree, and on 26 December 1812 was promoted to Lieutenant General (генерал-лейтенант or General-leytenant). After the French retreat from Russia, Emme took part in the Battle of Mitava, and later took part in the Siege of Memel. During the War of the Sixth Coalition (known as the Foreign Campaign in Russia), he was present at the Siege of Elbing and Siege of Danzig.

During the Russian's advance into what is now Germany, the 26th Infantry Division was reformed under command of Emme, and lead the division during the Siege of Hamburg. On 28 January 1814, Emme was raised to the 3rd class for the Order of Saint George for "excellent feats of courage, bravery, and management shown during the attack on Hamburg on 13 January.".

Following the Treaty of Fontainebleau, Emme continued to command the 26th Infantry Division until 15 February 1820, when he was posted to the 17th Infantry Division, and shortly thereafter moved to the 5th Infantry Division. On 24 October 1824, he was removed from his post and remained on the half-pay list till 1833.

On 20 December 1833, Emme retired from the army, retaining his uniform and a full pension in honour of his work during the Napoleonic Wars. In his later years he lived in Moscow, where he died on 12 September 1839, and was buried at the Inoversky cemetery, though his grave was later lost.

Emme had a brother Fyodor, and a son Alexander, both who served in the Imperial Russian Army.
