= Charles Louis Dieudonné Grandjean =

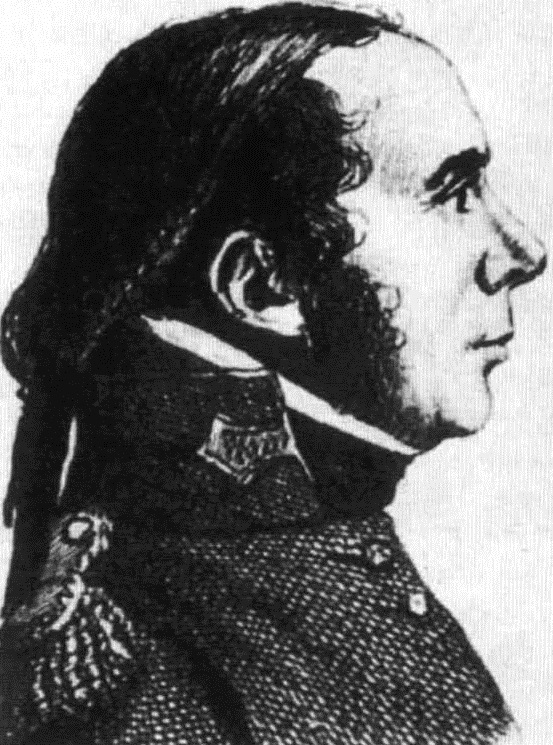
- Portrait of General Grandjean by André Dutertre.
- Born: 29 December 1768; Nancy, France
- Died: 15 September 1828 (aged 59) Nancy, France
- Allegiance: France
- Branch: Infantry
- Service years: 1792–1815
- Rank: General of Division
- Conflicts: War of the First Coalition; Rhine Campaign (1792–96); War of the Second Coalition; Battle of Verona; Battle of Magnano; Battle of Trebbia; Battle of Novi; Battle of Genola; Battle of Stockach; Battle of Neuburg; Battle of Hohenlinden; War of the Fourth Coalition; Great Sortie of Stralsund; Siege of Kolberg; Peninsular War; First Siege of Zaragoza; Second Siege of Zaragoza; War of the Fifth Coalition; Battle of Wagram; Siege of Danzig
- Awards: Légion d'Honneur, CC, 1804; Order of Saint Louis, 1814
- Other work: Baron of the Empire, 1810; Chamber of Deputies, 1821

Charles Louis Dieudonné Grandjean (French pronunciation: [ʃaʁl lwi djødɔne ɡʁɑ̃dʒɑ̃]; 29 December 1768 – 15 September 1828) became a French division commander and saw extensive service during the Napoleonic Wars. In 1792 he gave up his legal career to enlist in the infantry and served in the Army of the Rhine. In March 1799 he earned promotion to general of brigade by distinguished actions at Verona. That year he led an Army of Italy brigade at Magnano, the Trebbia, Novi and Genola. In 1800 he fought at Stockach and Hohenlinden.

Grandjean was awarded the Commander's Cross of the Légion d'Honneur in 1804 and elevated in rank to general of division in 1805. During the War of the Fourth Coalition he led a division at Stralsund and Kolberg. Transferring to Spain he fought at the First and Second Sieges of Zaragoza in 1808–09. Later that year he led a division at the Battle of Wagram. Grandjean and his division participated in the 1812 French invasion of Russia after which they were besieged and captured at Danzig in 1813. He rallied to Napoleon during the Hundred Days and was placed on the inactive list. In 1821 he was elected to the Chamber of Deputies. His surname is one of the names inscribed under the Arc de Triomphe, on Column 16.

== Revolution ==
=== Early career ===
Grandjean was born at Nancy on 29 December 1768. As a youth, he enrolled at the University of Göttingen where he earned a law degree, following in the footsteps of his father who was a lawyer. After the outbreak of the French Revolution he joined the National Guard and soon commanded the unit at Château-Salins. In May 1792 he enlisted in the 105th Line Infantry Regiment and became a sous-lieutenant, fighting in the Army of the Rhine. In 1793 he was appointed to lead a grenadier battalion. That year he joined the staff of Louis Desaix as an assistant adjutant general. Grandjean received promotion to chef de bataillon (major) in 1794. During this period he served in the Army of the Moselle and the Army of the Rhine. He was elevated in rank to adjutant general chef de brigade (colonel) on 12 May 1796.

=== 1799 ===
By his actions at Pastrengo during the Battle of Verona Grandjean compelled 1,200 Austrians to lay down their weapons. For this exploit he earned a battlefield promotion to general of brigade on 26 March 1799. He led a brigade in the division of Antoine Guillaume Delmas at the Battle of Magnano on 5 April 1799. The division included three battalions each of the 26th, 31st and 93rd Line Infantry Demi-brigades, a grenadier battalion, 1,800 cavalry and a company of foot artillery. The French army commander Barthélemy Louis Joseph Schérer allowed his divisions to fight in isolation. The left flank divisions were successful but Delmas in the center was late to battle and the French right flank divisions were overwhelmed by superior numbers. Schérer conceded victory to the Austrians and began a long retreat.

Grandjean led a brigade in Claude Perrin Victor's division at the Battle of Trebbia. Under his command were the 5th, 39th and 92nd Line Infantry Demi-brigades, a total of 3,765 foot soldiers. The army commander Étienne MacDonald was feverish from a wound and was unable to coordinate his divisions effectively. On 17 June the leading divisions of Victor, Jean-Baptiste Dominique Rusca, Jean Henri Dombrowski and Jean-Baptiste Salme attacked without orders and were repulsed at the Tidone River. The next day the French were able to hold off the Austro-Russian attacks. On the 19 June, MacDonald ordered a general assault which was beaten back with heavy losses. Victor exploited a gap in the enemy lines but he was compelled to withdraw after the defeat of the other divisions. French generals Victor, Rusca, Dombrowski, Salme, Grandjean, Jean-Baptiste Olivier and Alexis Aimé Pierre Cambray were wounded, the last fatally.

At the Battle of Novi on 15 August 1799, Grandjean commanded a brigade in Emmanuel Grouchy's division of Catherine-Dominique de Pérignon's Left Wing. Under his command were the 26th, 39th and 92nd Line Infantry Demi-brigades. Though holding high ground, Grouchy's division on the left flank was unprepared for the Austrian attack at dawn and was pushed back. However, the nearby French reserves were sent into the fight and forced the Austrians off the heights. At about this time the French army commander Barthélémy Catherine Joubert was killed. The French left wing repulsed a second Austrian assault at mid-morning. The French lines finally collapsed in the late afternoon and enemy cavalry cut down and captured both Grouchy and Pérignon.

After Novi, Grandjean succeeded to the leadership of Grouchy's division. When Victor's Trebbia wound healed, he replaced Grandjean as division commander. Grandjean led his brigade in Victor's division at the Battle of Genola on 4–5 November 1799. The new army commander Jean Étienne Championnet attacked with his divisions spread out while the Austrians were concentrated. On the 4th, Victor's right flank division held its own but the Austrians overpowered Paul Grenier's division on the left flank. On the 5th, the Austrians captured many French troops and chased their foes into the mountains. Victor lost 6,000 of his 9,000 soldiers in the debacle.

=== 1800 ===
In April 1800, Grandjean transferred to the division of Delmas in Jean Victor Marie Moreau's Army of the Rhine where he served as a brigadier. He fought at the Battle of Engen–Stockach where he distinguished himself. Soon he replaced Delmas as division commander. He led the division during a series of successful clashes along the Iller River on 5 June 1800. He fought under Claude Lecourbe at the Battle of Neuburg after which an armistice came into force. On 3 December 1800, he led a brigade in Grouchy's division at the Battle of Hohenlinden though it is not stated which units were under his command. Early that morning, the Austrian left center column under Johann Kollowrat and Archduke John blundered into Grouchy's division and the fighting began. At first the 108th Line Infantry fought stubbornly but it was driven back. Grouchy ordered a counterattack by the 46th and 57th Line Infantry, followed by a cavalry charge that forced the Austrian advanced guard back into the forest. Later in the day, Antoine Richepanse's division enveloped the Austrian south flank and attacked Kollowrat's column from the rear. Caught between the divisions of Grouchy, Richepanse and Michel Ney, Kollowrat's column disintegrated into flight and the archduke only escaped the disaster by hard riding. The Austrians suffered 1,900 men killed and wounded and 8,000 men and 50 guns captured.

== Empire ==
=== Northern Europe ===
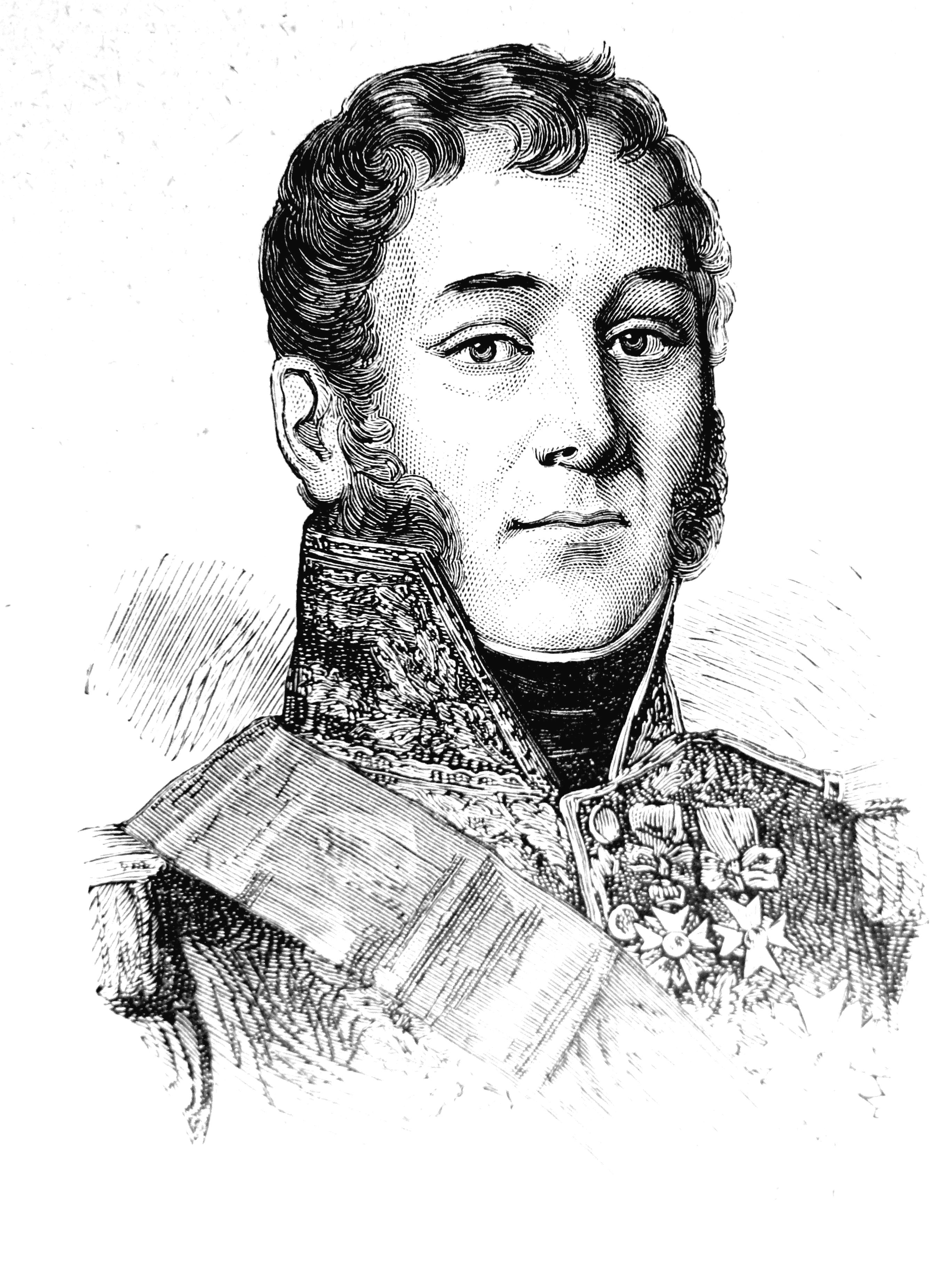
Édouard Mortier

Afterward, Grandjean held commands in the 4th and 5th Military Divisions. Emperor Napoleon awarded him with the Commander's Cross of the Légion d'Honneur on 14 June 1804. This was followed by a promotion to general of division on 1 February 1805. He assumed command of the 25th Military Division in March 1805 and led a reserve division when the War of the Fourth Coalition broke out that August. In late 1806, he was assigned to a command in Northern Europe under Marshal Édouard Mortier, duc de Trévise.

At the start of 1807, French forces led by Mortier crossed the Peene River and advanced toward Stralsund with two divisions. On the east, Grandjean started his division from Anklam and drove back the Swedish outposts. On the west, the division of Pierre Louis Dupas crossed the Peene without opposition at Demmin. Mortier's two divisions closed up to the city and began the blockade on 30 January. For two months there were clashes as the French tightened their investment of the port, but were unable to stop Stralsund from being supplied by sea. While French troops amounting to one cavalry and three infantry regiments were withdrawn to fight against the Russians, they were replaced by soldiers from the Kingdom of Holland.

Mortier received orders to maintain the blockade with Grandjean's division and march with his other forces to assist in the Siege of Kolberg. After Mortier left, the Swedes drove Grandjean's outnumbered troops from their siege lines. Grandjean fell back to Anklam where he was attacked again on 3 April and compelled to withdraw southeast to Stettin on the Oder River, reaching there on 7 April. Mortier retraced his steps and by 13 April had assembled 12,000–13,000 men at Stettin, the same as the Swedes. In rainy weather, Mortier drove his adversaries back to Anklam and after a scuffle, the Swedes retreated to the north bank of the Peene on 17 April. Franco-Allied troops under Guillaume Brune successfully concluded the Siege of Stralsund on 20 August 1807.

The French VIII Corps under Mortier began the Siege of Kolberg on 20 March 1807. The siege force numbered no more than 14,000 men and 41 artillery pieces at any time and consisted of French, Dutch, Italian, Polish, Rhenish and Württemberger troops. During part of the siege, Grandjean led an all-Dutch division that included two battalions each of the 1st and 2nd Light and the 2nd, 4th, 7th and 8th Line Infantry Regiments plus four squadrons each of the 1st and 2nd Hussar Regiments. The 6,000-man Prussian garrison conducted such an effective defense that Mortier abandoned the siege on 2 July. Franco-Allied losses were 102 officers and 5,000 rank and file killed, wounded or died of sickness while Prussian casualties numbered 55 officers and 3,000 men. In November 1807 Grandjean supervised a division of Confederation of the Rhine troops in Pommerania. In April 1808 he was sent to Bayonne to lead a division headed for Spain.

=== Spain ===
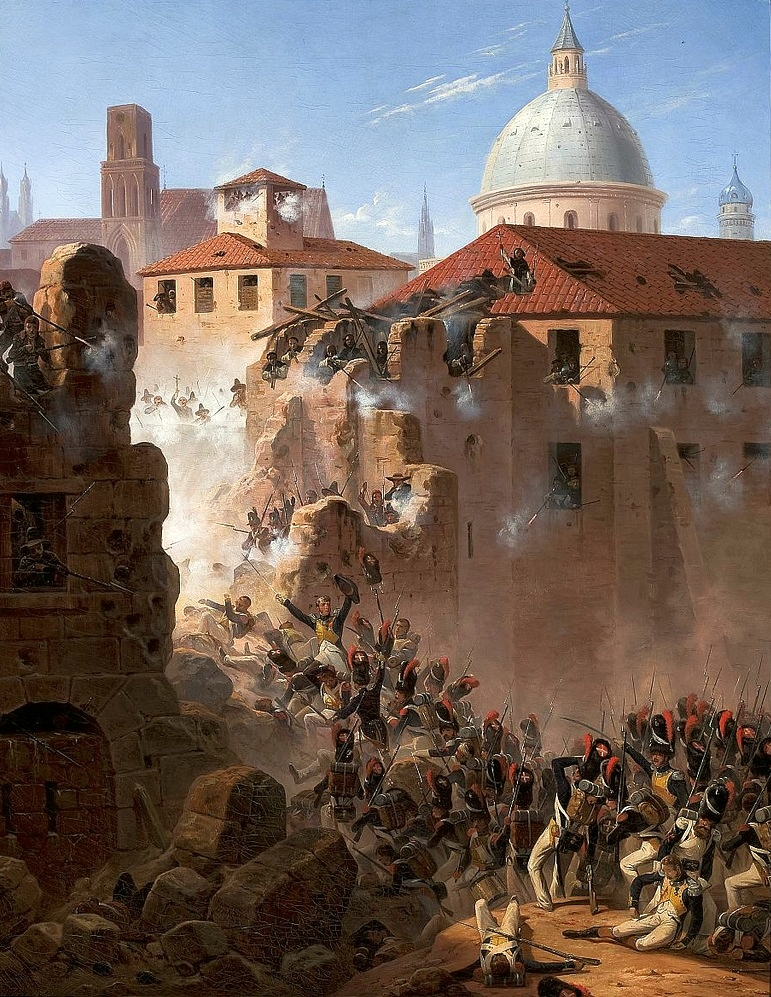
Assault on Saragossa by January Suchodolski, 1845. Grandjean led soldiers at the first and second sieges of Zaragoza.

The First Siege of Zaragoza lasted from 15 June to 14 August 1808. The struggle was notable for brutal house-to-house fighting. The French attackers abandoned 54 cannons and withdrew after receiving news of the disastrous Battle of Bailén, having suffered 3,500 casualties. Grandjean arrived at some time during the siege and directed a 2,991-man force that included the 1st and 2nd Battalions of the 2nd Legion of the Vistula (a Polish unit), the 3rd Battalion of the 70th Line Infantry Regiment and the 4 and 6 March Battalions.

After a reorganization, Grandjean took charge of the 4th Division in the III Corps under Marshal Bon-Adrien Jeannot de Moncey. The division consisted of three battalions of the 5th Light Infantry Regiment, two battalions of the 1st Legion of the Vistula and four battalions of the 2nd Legion of the Reserve. These troops participated in the Battle of Tudela on 23 November 1808, though Grandjean's division did not fire a shot or suffer any casualties. The division was soon broken up and Grandjean assumed command of the 1st Division in the same corps. He led four battalions of the 14th Line, three battalions of the 44th Line, one battalion of the 70th Line and two battalions each of the 2nd and 3rd Legions of the Vistula.

The Second Siege of Zaragoza began on 19 December 1808 and ended 20 February 1809 when the city surrendered. This time the French employed both Mortier's V Corps and Moncey's III Corps. As in the first siege, fighting was extremely bitter and costly for both sides. French losses are estimated at 10,000 killed, wounded and died of disease. Spanish losses were appalling, with 18,000 killed or dead from disease and 12,000 captured. Another 34,000 civilians perished, mostly from typhus and the city was in ruins. Though the soldiers of Moncey's corps were already suffering from illness at the start of the siege, they were called upon to do most of the fighting. The III Corps approached the city on the south side of the Ebro River with the divisions of Grandjean, Antoine Morlot and Louis François Félix Musnier. At the end of December Moncey was replaced by Jean-Andoche Junot.

On 10 January 1809 Grandjean's troops captured a key outwork, the San José Convent. On 22 January Marshal Jean Lannes took command of the siege from Junot. On 27 January the light companies of Grandjean's 1st Brigade successfully stormed a breach in the city walls near the Palafox Battery and Musnier's division broke into the city in another place. Ordinarily, a lodgment within a city's walls would prompt the defenders to ask for terms, but the Spanish continued to fight behind barricaded houses and churches. Lannes determined to reduce the city building-by-building if necessary. Grandjean's division stormed the Santa Monica Convent on 30 January. Two days later the French overran the adjoining San Augustin Convent after a murderous struggle amid the pews of the convent church. That day, the 44th Line broke through the defenders and advanced to the center of the city but were then driven back nearly to their starting point after losing 200 men. Henceforth, Lannes decreed that the attackers must first consolidate their gains. As the French continued to edge forward street by street, covered by their plentiful artillery, the defense finally started to collapse. On 18 February, Grandjean's division seized the University and two days later the Spanish capitulated.

Since most of the fighting strength of Aragon was killed or captured in the siege, the two corps of Junot and Mortier rapidly overran the Ebro valley. Grandjean's division seized Caspe and Alcañiz before moving south as far as Morella. Badly overextended, he abandoned Morella soon after. On 5 April, Napoleon ordered Mortier's corps to withdraw from Aragon, leaving Junot's corps too weak to hold the province. On 5 May at Monzón, Spanish guerillas inflicted a defeat on one of Grandjean's brigades led by Pierre-Joseph Habert. His other brigade under Anne Gilbert de Laval was forced to relinquish Alcañiz to a Spanish army under Joaquín Blake on 19 May. On this day, Junot was replaced in command of the III Corps by Louis-Gabriel Suchet. In his first independent command, Suchet received a drubbing from Blake at the Battle of Alcañiz on 23 May 1809. In the next few weeks, Suchet reorganized, paid and properly uniformed his small corps. He also dismissed a number of officers. Grandjean was replaced by Laval and sent back to France.

=== Wagram to Danzig ===
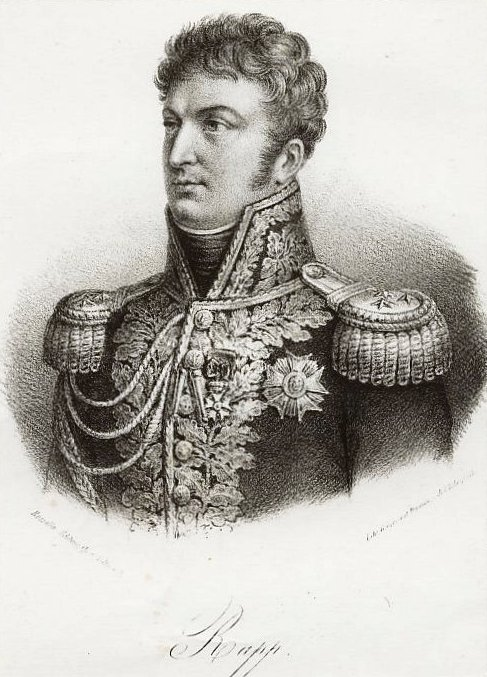
Jean Rapp

In April 1809 Grandjean transferred to Germany where he took command of Landshut. He assumed command of the II Corps division of Louis-Vincent-Joseph Le Blond de Saint-Hilaire after that general was fatally wounded at the Battle of Aspern-Essling. On 5–6 July 1809 he led the division at the Battle of Wagram. His command included three battalions each of the 10th Light and 3rd, 57th, 72nd and 105th Line Infantry Regiments plus 16 guns in one 8-pounder and one 6-pounder battery. On the evening of the 5th, Grandjean's division attacked Baumersdorf and captured 2,000 Austrians and four colors. However, the Austrian army commander Archduke Charles, Duke of Teschen personally directed several cavalry charges which forced the division to withdraw. The II Corps assault on 6 July was successful in pressing back the Austrian left wing. Grandjean had two horses killed under him during the battle.

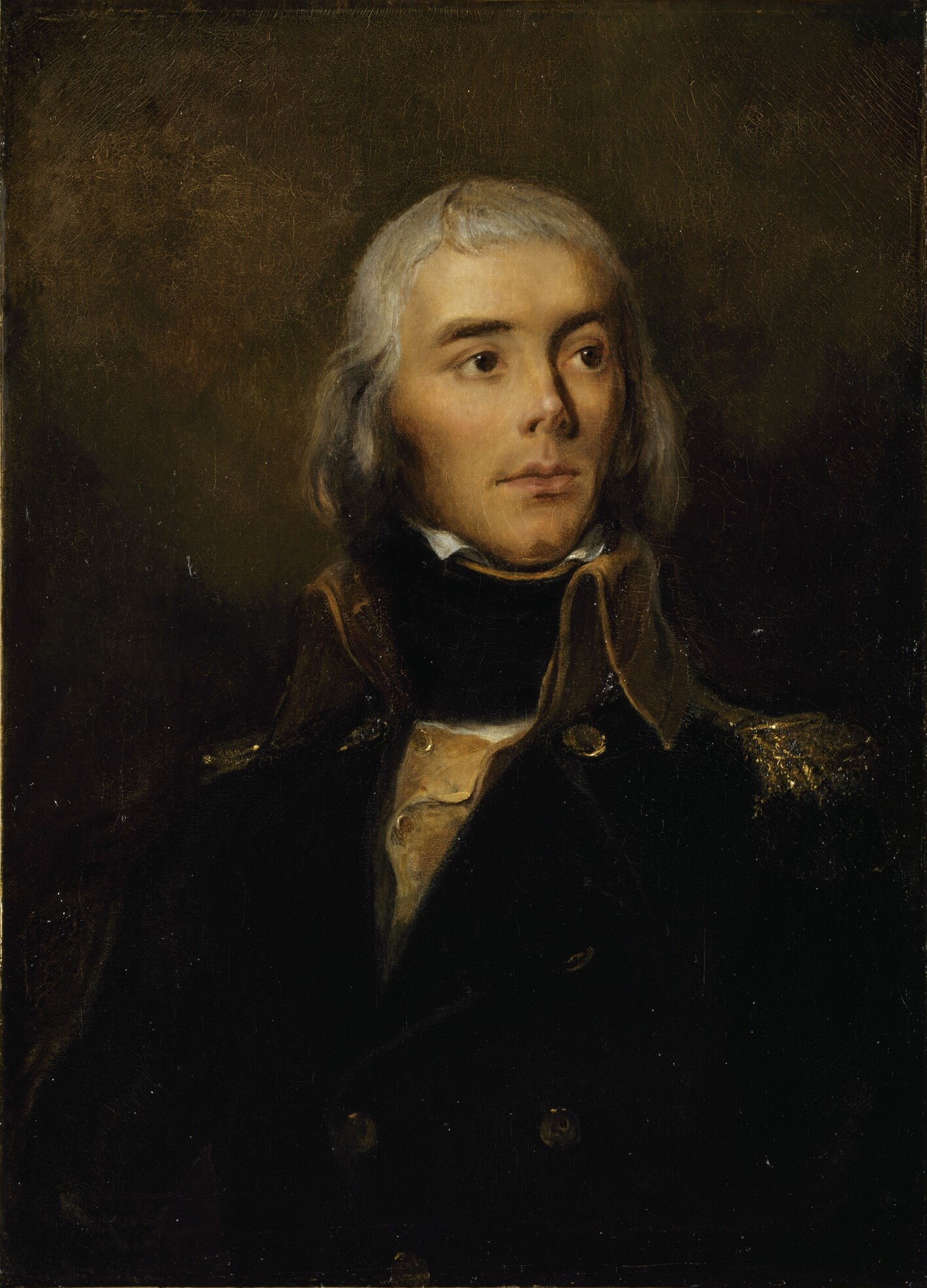
Étienne MacDonald

Napoleon appointed Grandjean a Baron of the Empire on 31 January 1810. Grandjean headed the 14th Military Division from May 1810 until May 1811 when he became second-in-command at Danzig. He took command of the Polish-German 7th Infantry Division under the overall leadership of Marshal Louis-Nicolas Davout in September 1811.

During the French invasion of Russia, Grandjean commanded the 11,000-man 7th Division in the X Corps under Marshal MacDonald. The corps was a 32,497-strong formation that included 2,474 cavalry and 84 cannons. The other two divisions in the corps were made up of Prussian soldiers. From 24 July to 18 December 1812, the X Corps maintained an unsuccessful blockade of Riga. Grandjean's division had three infantry brigades supported by four squadrons of the 1st Prussian Hussar Regiment and two Polish horse artillery companies. Gilbert Bachelu's brigade consisted of two battalions of the 1st Westphalian Regiment and four battalions of the 11th Polish Regiment. Étienne Pierre Sylvestre Ricard's brigade included two battalions of the 13th Bavarian Regiment and four battalions of the 5th Polish Regiment. Prince Radziwiłł's brigade comprised four battalions of the 10th Polish Regiment. During the withdrawal from Riga, Prussian General Ludwig Yorck von Wartenburg signed the Convention of Tauroggen with the Russians on 30 December, taking the Prussians out of the French alliance.

The 7th Division retreated to Danzig where it formed part of the 36,000-man garrison. The Siege of Danzig lasted from 16 January to 29 November 1813 when Jean Rapp surrendered to a 40,000-man Russo-Prussian army. During the lengthy siege, French-Allied defenders lost 6,000 killed and wounded, 8,000 desertions, 6,000 sick and 16,000 captured as well as 1,300 artillery pieces. Grandjean was released from captivity after Napoleon's abdication.

== Later career ==
Grandjean received the Order of Saint Louis in 1814. The following year he joined Napoleon during the Hundred Days and was assigned to lead the 17th Infantry Division in Rapp's V Corps. After the second Bourbon Restoration he was placed on the inactive list. He was elected to the Chamber of Deputies in 1821 and stood with the opposition party. He died at Nancy on 15 September 1828. The name GRANDJEAN is on the eastern side of the Arc de Triomphe.
