= Prussian Army of the Napoleonic Wars =

Armed force of Prussia during the Napoleonic Wars

Royal Prussian Army
- Königlich Preußische Armee
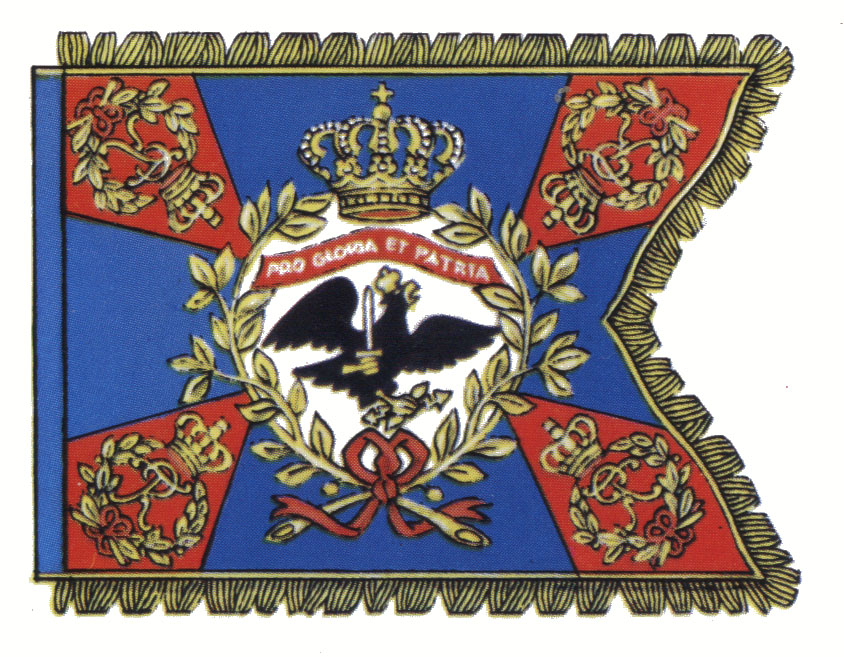
- A standard of the Prussian Army used before 1807
- Motto: Pro Gloria et Patria, 'For Glory and Country'
- Founded: 1701
- Service branches: Infantry, Artillery, Cavalry

Leadership
- König von Preußen: Frederick William II; Frederick William III

Personnel
- Active personnel: approx. 240,000 until 1806, approx. 358,000 in 1815

The Prussian Army of the Napoleonic Wars underwent a profound transformation between 1806 and 1815. Before 1806, the army was characterized by an inflexible command structure, reliance on an aristocratic officer corps, strict discipline, and tactics developed during the era of Frederick the Great. Frederick the Great's successor, his nephew Frederick William II, showed little interest in military affairs and relaxed conditions in Prussia, delegating responsibility to the aging Duke of Brunswick. As a result, the army began to degrade in quality, led by veterans of the Silesian Wars who retained outdated training, tactics, and weaponry from four decades earlier.

These features left the Prussian Army ill-equipped to face Revolutionary France, whose forces—especially under Napoleon Bonaparte—were adopting innovative methods of organization, supply, mobility, and command. This disparity contributed to Prussia's decisive defeat at Jena and Auerstedt in 1806. Following this defeat, Prussia initiated sweeping military reforms led by figures such as Gerhard von Scharnhorst and August von Gneisenau. The reforms introduced universal conscription, opened advancement to all ranks based on merit rather than birth, modernized training, and adopted more adaptable tactics. These changes revitalized the army, enabling it to play a central role in the later campaigns against Napoleon and to contribute significantly to the coalition victories that ultimately ended the Napoleonic Wars.

== Command, control and organization ==
=== Staff system ===
The Prussian army did not have an effective staff organisation at this time. The Prussian General-Quartiermeister-Stab (General Quartermaster Staff) was initially established by Frederick William III in 1803. It was divided into three departments each corresponding with parts of the state. The Eastern Brigade covering the territory east of the Vistula, the Western Brigade covering the territory west of the Elbe and the Southern Brigade covering the south of the kingdom. It was headed by a General Quartermaster (General-Quartiermeister) while a Lieutenant (General-Quartiermeister-Lieutenant) headed each brigade. Following the collapse after the defeat the three brigades were merged in 1807. During peacetime they were to develop operational plans for defensive and offensive actions in any potential campaign. They were also to produce detailed maps. From 1808 they studied recent campaigns and considered potential future scenarios. In 1810 Frederick William decreed that staff officers serve with different branches so as to gain practical knowledge of soldiering. On mobilization staff officers would then be distributed among the personal staff of generals in various commands.

The Oberkriegskollegium, 'Supreme War College', was established in 1787 with the goal of bringing all military concerns back under central control and coordinating the different competing institutions. However, the relationship between the new agency and the commanding generals was conveniently left unclear, and issues pertaining to leadership and military operations were deliberately reserved for the king's discretion from the outset. In fact, the Oberkriegskollegium was unable to coordinate even the army's essentially administrative operations. The Militär Department, 'Military Department', consistently challenged its authority, and the General Adjutantur steadily weakened its position.

== Recruitment and training ==
In 1806, the recruitment system of the Prussian Army remained fundamentally unchanged from the era of Frederick the Great. The army's rank and file consisted of local conscripts and foreign mercenaries, reflecting aspects of both a territorial militia and a foreign legion. Native Prussian soldiers were selected through the Cantonal System, which allocated each regiment a specific recruitment area around its peacetime garrison town. Every male in these districts was registered at birth and, as he matured, became increasingly involved in the military system, swearing an oath of service after his religious confirmation and facing severe penalties for desertion, including threats against his family's property.

Regimental officers, in cooperation with civilian officials, annually selected recruits to fulfill their unit's requirements. Service terms were indefinite, intended to maximize the army's investment in training. However, extensive exemptions existed, excluding whole localities—such as major cities and certain provinces—as well as categories of individuals like craftsmen, businessmen, landowners, and others deemed essential to the economy or lacking military aptitude. In some regions, particularly Westphalia, regiments relied almost entirely on foreign recruits due to the perceived unsuitability of the local population for military service.

The army's peacetime routines allowed native soldiers significant time at home, as regiments only needed to be at full strength for seasonal reviews and exercises. For much of the year, soldiers returned to their civilian lives, often taking up trades or working in local industries. Those remaining at the garrison could pursue civilian work as long as they fulfilled basic military obligations, such as attending weekly church parades. This blend of military and civilian life was further reflected in garrison orders, which regulated soldiers' civilian employment and behavior. Despite its complexity, the canton-based recruitment system generally functioned effectively. The careful selection of conscripts ensured high standards within units, fostering regimental cohesion and camaraderie, as most soldiers hailed from the same region. This system also contributed to local economies and communities, as returning soldiers brought discipline, skills, and sometimes even linguistic and cultural influences to their home villages. Overall, the recruitment system of 1806 reflected both the strengths and limitations of an army still rooted in the practices of the previous century.

While drill, manners, and operational procedures were taught to all infantry recruits, skirmisher training was also highly valued. All companies employed their third rank for skirmishing, while fusilier battalions used all three ranks. Every year, field service was practiced during fall maneuvers. On the first day of training, the recruits were given their muskets and were prepared to begin using them right away. After 14 days, they would be able to move on to fire, first with blanks and subsequently at a practice target, as these were the primary focus of the exercise.

Little time was spent instructing the soldiers in other maneuvers, and they were left alone until they were confident in their ability to handle their arms. On the first day, teaching in skirmishing, including the signals and the specifics of daily service, began. Within the first eight days, instruction in field service would follow. The time spent traveling to the army was to be used for this teaching; marching training, including the maneuvers, was to be employed simply for variety and should not take up much time. Regardless of their height, the recruits who had received such hurried training were to be integrated into the rank and file in the middle files of the sections, while men who had served longer were to fill the flank files of the sections and platoons.

=== Infantry ===
The Prussian infantry consisted of fusiliers, grenadiers, and musketeers. Two companies of grenadiers and two battalions of musketeers made up a line unit. These regiments were numbered based on seniority and named after their colonels-in-chief. During a war, an infantry regiment's grenadier companies were merged with those of another regiment to form a battalion, which was named after its field commander. The grenadier battalions had four companies, totaling eight platoons, while the musketeer battalions had five companies, each with two platoons. In times of peace, fusiliers, a light infantry force, were organized into brigades consisting of three battalions. The battalions were individually assigned to larger formations in the case of conflict. They were known by the names of their field commanders.

A grenadier battalion had an establishment of 18 officers, 56 NCOs, 1 artillery NCO (for the battalion gun), four surgeons, twelve drummers, 1 bugler (for the Schützen), eight fifers, 17 gunners, 40 Schützen, 600 grenadiers, 40 reserves and eight sappers, a total of 805 men. A musketeer battalion had an establishment of 22 to 23 officers, 60 NCOSs, 1 artillery NCO, 5 surgeons, 15 drummers, 1 bugler, 17 gunners, 50 Schützen, 600 musketeers, 50 reserves and 10 sappers, a total of 831 to 832 men. In addition, the Ist battalion of a regiment had 6 oboe players. A fusilier battalion had an establishment of 19 officers, 48 NCOs, 4 surgeons, 5 drummers, 8 buglers, 40 Schützen, 520 fusiliers, 40 reserves and 8 sappers, a total of 692 men.

Ten companies made up the Foot Jäger regiment, which had 1,800 privates, 36 buglers, 120 NCOs, and 51 officers. Similar to the fusilier battalions, this formation's rifle-armed companies were known by the names of their respective field commanders and were frequently assigned to other units. There was a lack of uniformity in the Jäger's armament because they were recruited in part from hunters and gamekeepers, who frequently carried their own firearms. The Schützen were selected soldiers and marksmen, armed with 18.5mm calibre rifles; they enjoyed NCO status and were used as skirmishers for the units to which they were attached.

Two battalions of musketeers (line infantry) and one battalion of fusiliers (light infantry) made up a Prussian infantry regiment after the post-Jena reforms. An autonomous grenadier battalion was formed by combining the two grenadier companies with those of another regiment. The column by the center, with the troops in the third rank providing the skirmish element, was the favored combat configuration. A battalion's theoretical strength was about 800 men. The skirmish element was supplied at the brigade level by the fusilier battalions; a Prussian brigade is comparable to a division in most other armies.

=== Cavalry ===
Heavy (cuirassiers), medium (dragoons), and light (hussars and lance-armed Uhlans) made up the cavalry. Due to East Prussian horse studs, the Prussian cavalry was the best-mounted in Europe at the time of the Battle of Jena in 1806. The elite heavy formation consisted of the Gendarmes and the aristocratic Garde du Corps. They each had five squadrons, carrying 779 officers and 845 men. Five squadrons of 31 officers, 75 NCOs, 15 trumpeters, and 720 other ranks were also part of the 11 cuirassier regiments. There were 841 officers and soldiers in each of the 14 dragoon regiments (five squadrons each in all but two elite cases). There were ten squadrons in each of the nine Hussar regiments (45 officers, 178 NCOs, 28 trumpeters, and 1,320 troops). The Hussar Battalion Bila, which had five squadrons and 771 commanders and soldiers, was an anomaly. Every cavalryman carried a carbine piece, a pistol, and a sword or sabre. The five squadrons of Towarczys, totaling 626 men, were one unit that used lances. The "Normal Squadron" was established on June 1st, 1811. One company of dragoons and one of hussars made up the group; the former was made up of chosen members of the dragoon and cuirassier regiments, while the latter was made up of hussars and Uhlans.

=== Artillery ===
53 officers, 40 sergeants, 100 corporals, 220 bombarciiers, 1,600 gunners, 10 surgeons, 8 oboists, and 10 drummers (11 in the 3rd and 4th Regiments) made up each regiment. With 16 officers, 12 sergeants, 30 corporals, 66 bombardiers, 480 gunners, and 3 doctors, the Horse Artillery was divided into three companies. Four officers, six NCOs, and forty-eight men made up the Pontonier Corps, which was joined to the artillery in 1787. Their numbers surged during the war. There were several bridging trains and 153 pontoons available in 1790.

Prussian artillery was arranged into eight-piece batteries, often consisting of two howitzers and six cannons. Heavy 12-pdr cannons with 10-pdr howitzers and light 6-pdr cannons with 7-pdr howitzers made up the foot artillery. The smaller pieces and so-called "Reserve" batteries, which each had twelve 6-pdr guns, were utilized by the horse artillery. These batteries were frequently dispersed among the infantry battalions as regimental artillery. During the 1806 campaign, Prussia lost a significant amount of its artillery. In the years that followed, significant attempts were made to replace it, and by the fall of 1812, there were 1,659 pieces available. This was more than sufficient for a 42,000-man army, but during the 1813 mobilization, extra pieces had to be acquired from other sources.

=== Ranks of the Prussian Army ===
This chart shows the line infantry, cavalry, and light infantry ranking system for the Royal Prussian Army of 1808 onward. General der Infanterie and its equivalent, General der Cavallerie, were unused but still official from 1808 until December 1813. The ranks are in the contemporary German used by the Prussians, not modern German.

| Prussian line infantry rank | Cavalry equivalent | Light infantry equivalent |
|---|---|---|
| General-Feldmarschall | N/A | N/A |
| General der Infanterie | General der Cavallerie | N/A |
| General-Lieutenant | N/A | N/A |
| General-Major | N/A | N/A |
| Oberst | Oberst | N/A |
| Oberst-Lieutenant | Oberstlieutenant | N/A |
| Major | Major | Major |
| Capitän | Rittmeister | Hauptmann |
| Premier-Lieutenant | Premier-Lieutenant | Premier-Lieutenant |
| Seconde-Lieutenant | Seconde-Lieutenant | Seconde-Lieutenant |
| Fähnrich | Fähnrich | Fähnrich |
| Feldwebel | Wachtmeister | Feldwebel |
| Sergeant | Unterwachtmeister | Sergeant |
| Unterofficier | Unterofficier | Unterofficier |
| Gefreiter | Gefreiter | Oberjäger or Oberschütze |
| Soldat (i.e. Musketier, Grenadier, etc.) | Reiter | Jäger or Schütze |

The king could also serve as a military commander.

=== Organization of Army ===
==== Royal Guard ====
As of 1813, the Royal Prussian Army's Royal Guard consisted of the following regiments:

| Regiment name | In contemporary German | Regimental role |
|---|---|---|
| 1st Guard Regiment on Foot | 1. Garde-Regiment zu Fuß | Guard infantry, 2 guard grenadier battalions and 1 fusilier battalion |
| 2nd Guard Regiment on Foot | 2. Garde-Regiment zu Fuß | Guard infantry, 3 guard grenadier battalions |
| Guard Hunter Battalion | Garde-Jäger-Bataillon | Guard riflemen, 1 battalion of riflemen |
| Regiment of Guard Foot Artillery | Garde-Fuß-Artillerie-Regiment | Guard foot artillery, 2 batteries |
| Battery of Guard Horse Artillery | Garde-Reitende-Artillerie-Batterie | Guard horse artillery, 1 battery |
| Horse Guards | Regiment der Gardes du Corps | Guard heavy cavalry, 4 squadrons |

The following regiments were raised after Napoleon's exile in 1815, with the exception of the 2 grenadier regiments which were created in 1814 as a result of merging the provincial grenadier battalions:

| Regiment name | In contemporary German | Regimental role |
|---|---|---|
| Guard Riflemen Battalion | Garde-Schützen-Bataillon | Guard riflemen, 1 battalion of riflemen |
| Guard Uhlan Regiment | Garde-Ulanen-Regiment | Guard lancer cavalry, 2 squadrons |
| Guard Hussar Regiment | Garde-Husaren-Regiment | Guard hussars, 2 squadrons |
| Guard Dragoon Regiment | Garde-Dragoner-Regiment | Guard dragoons, 2 squadrons |
| 1st "Emperor Alexander" Grenadier Regiment | 1. Grenadier-Regiment "Kaiser Alexander" | Guard grenadiers, 3 battalions |
| 2nd "Emperor Franz" Grenadier Regiment | 2. Grenadier-Regiment "Kaiser Franz" | Guard grenadiers, 3 battalions |

== Uniforms ==
=== Infantry ===
Since the reign of Frederick the Great Prussian uniforms had changed little. Infantry wore Prussian blue coats, officers wore three-cornered hats, while grenadiers and fusiliers used brass-fronted caps. Officers' uniforms were made of fine dark blue cloth with velvet lapels, cuffs, and collars in regimental colors, richly decorated with gold or silver Brandenbourgs. Despite their rank, all officers wore the same uniform except for the introduction of a hat plume for generals in 1742, creating a sense of corporate unity. Infantry hats included tall mitre caps for grenadiers, lower caps for fusiliers, and small three-cornered hats for the line. Uniform coats were cut short to save cloth, with little blue visible except for sleeves and contrasting facings, often in poppy red. The material was coarse and meant to last only two years, and Frederick abolished the cloak to economize further. Soldiers often improvised with greatcoats or furs for warmth. Under the coat, a waistcoat in white or yellow, a linen dickey, and a coarse shirt were worn, along with matching breeches. Gaiters were broad for comfort, and black leather shoes had square toes and high heels. Soldiers sometimes discarded the feet of their wool stockings, wrapping their feet in tallow-soaked cloth, which caused a strong odor on the march.

Frederick William II introduced changes in 1786–1797. Lapels became standard for all, undergarments were made white, and the old hat was replaced by a Kaskett, a bicorne with regimental decorations and a colored hackle. Grenadiers wore this headgear with a white plume, and the term "fusilier" took on a new meaning as those troops adopted green metal eagles and black cravats with white edging. Breeches were briefly green before reverting to white. Black equipment worn crossed appeared at the end of his reign. Frederick William III made further changes after 1797. Skirts were fastened up, coat pockets abolished, and collars became higher and stand-up. The Kaskett gave way to a new hat and grenadier caps with colored bands. Lapels now fastened down the front.

Officers wore sashes over their coats, switched to knee boots, and men used linen overalls. The queue was gradually shortened. Fusiliers' equipment was no longer crossed, and their headdress evolved from a hat with tuft and eagle badge to a chaco. In 1806, coats were shortened, skirts turned back, and undergarments returned to white. Officers' uniforms were increasingly embroidered or laced, and distinctions were shown by lace and plumes. After the defeat of 1806 and the subsequent army reorganization, uniforms changed dramatically. The queue disappeared and the hat was replaced by a chaco; a double-breasted jacket without lapels became standard. Breeches became gray, and the knapsack was now worn on both shoulders. Regimental distinctions were shown in facings and shoulder strap colors, with each province having specific colors. Officers' chacos had silver lace and eagles, with colored plumes showing rank and regiment. The sword belt was generally worn over the shoulder, and officers now carried straight swords or sabers depending on their unit. Oilcloth covers were used to protect the chaco.

During the Napoleonic Wars, uniforms of the many new reserve regiments varied widely, often supplied by Britain, and officers sometimes wore simple oilcloth caps. In 1814, collars were closed, chacos became rounder, cockades became elliptical, and chinscales replaced chinstraps. Regimental colors and distinctions continued to adapt, with new colors assigned to provinces and additional details for the new regiments. Fusiliers originally wore dark green coats, black gaiters, and a bicorn with eagle badge. Officers had velvet facings and wore white-over-black feather plumes. In 1797, the tricorn returned, and battalions were identified by pompon color. A cylindrical shako appeared in 1801. Facings varied by brigade, and officers' uniforms followed the cut of the line with additional distinctions.

After 1808, fusiliers wore uniforms matching their parent regiments, with blue tunics and yellow buttons, and adopted the shako with white, gold, or silver trim. Later, the shako was redesigned with new shapes, reinforcements, and decorative elements. Jaeger regiments wore green uniforms with red facings and initially a plain casquet, later a tricorn with cords. They adopted white breeches and boots in 1800, and eventually received dark green coatees with red details in 1808, matching the evolving style of the line. Their shakos had green cords and black plumes, and officers had their own distinctions in cords and plumes. By 1814, Jaegers wore shakos with hair plumes and regimental details on parade, adapting to the general modernization of Prussian uniforms.

=== Artillery ===
Foot artillery uniforms closely resembled those of the infantry, featuring a Prussian blue frock coat with blue facings and yellow buttons from 1787. The waistcoat and breeches were white. Field artillery personnel wore red neck stocks, while garrison artillery wore black. Headgear was the 'casquette' cocked hat, displaying a flaming grenade badge. The standard sidearm was the straight 'Pallasch' sword. Officers' coats were laced, NCOs had gold buttonhole lace, and drummers wore 22 bars of woollen lace, with 16 ending in tassels. In 1798, artillery uniforms were updated with black facings and the tricorn hat replacing the casquette. Officers' facings were made of velvet and decorated with ten lapel buttons and 18 bars of lace. The Feuerwerker had 12 narrower lace bars, bombardiers had woollen lace, and sergeant's lace ended with tassels. In 1799, Silesian garrison artillery companies changed their neck stocks from black to red, with officers adopting white.

Horse artillery uniforms were similar but included typical cavalry distinctions in hat, legwear, and boots, and plumes were permitted only in the field. In 1801, dragoon-style coatees were introduced, with hats featuring a cockade and feather plume. Cavalry overalls were worn with hussar boots, and a short sword was carried on a dragoon belt. Black facings were outlined in red piping. From 1802, officers' hats lost their lace but retained a feather plume secured by a cavalry clasp. NCOs wore gold lace on various parts of their uniform, and the Feuerwerker had a gold clasp on their hats. The blue saddlecloths were rectangular, edged in black with yellow piping, and displayed the royal monogram in each corner. Greatcoat covers were blue.

Between 1808 and 1815, artillerymen wore the period's standard coatee, with officers in long-tailed coats. Foot artillery uniforms matched those of the infantry, while horse artillery uniforms followed cavalry styles. The coatee for foot artillery was Prussian blue with red tail turn-backs, while horse artillery wore black with poppy-red piping. Collars were black piped in poppy-red until 1815, then the piping shifted to the top edge and front. Guard artillery had yellow guard lace on their collars and cuffs, and buttons were yellow. Shoulder strap colors varied: white for Prussian Brigade, yellow for Silesian, poppy-red for Brandenburg and the guard. The guard and horse artillery had Swedish cuffs; foot artillery had Brandenburg cuffs with a blue flap. Bombardiers and sergeants wore gold lace on cuffs, and musicians had black 'swallows' nests' on their shoulders, with the guard's nests featuring yellow lace and fringes, and the line's with white lace. From 1809, horse artillery could also wear the longer "Litewka" coat. Officers had the usual distinctions previously described.

Shakos for foot artillery matched those of the infantry, while horse artillery shakos included brass chin scales for other ranks, gilded chains for officers, a black and white cockade (black and silver for officers), and a brass Guard Star for guard artillery ranks. Guard artillery officers had a silver star with an enamelled badge, and line artillery had a brass grenade badge. Shako cords were yellow for rankers, black and white for NCOs, and red for the guard from 1814. Officers could wear a black cocked hat with a silver and black cockade for horse artillery, and a plain gold cord clasp for foot artillery. Horse artillery wore a black and white feather plume, while foot artillery wore black.

=== Cavalry ===
The heavy cavalry of Prussia experienced significant uniform changes before and after 1806, largely influenced by evolving military needs and cost-saving measures. Frederick William II discontinued the use of cuirasses, first in Regiments No. 6 and 7 during the 1787 Netherlands campaign, and formally banned them in 1790. Cuirasses were not used in the 1792–1794 campaigns and remained out of service, except possibly for Garde du Corps officers on parade, until they were reintroduced with captured French armor in 1814–15. The main tunic, called the Kollett, was made from off-white kirsey with a grey-yellow shade. Only Regiment No. 2 and the Brandenburg Cuirassiers retained yellow tunics up to 1808. The Kollett's collar was higher than in Frederick the Great's era, and dragoons' shoulder-straps were trimmed with lace across all regiments, which was new. Frederick William III introduced further adjustments: from 1803/4 tail trim changed from braid to cloth, and the Garde du Corps altered its trim twice between 1798 and 1803. The Chemisette jacket, worn under the Kollett, had short tails and was initially replaced in 1801 with a sewn-on false piece and a new white underjacket for economy.

Headgear for cuirassiers was a tricorn, modified over time to become higher with a flatter front. Horse-hair cockades and taller feather plumes were introduced before 1806, and the way the hat was worn shifted to cover the left eye. The uncomfortable iron casquet, intended as head protection, fell out of general use, though Garde du Corps were still ordered to carry it in 1805–1806. Troopers wore knee-length white-painted leather breeches, while officers, NCOs, and musicians had ankle-length versions. White cloth breeches were used for winter service, and new boot styles with stiff shafts and straight spurs appeared in 1790, though older boots remained in use for some regiments. The greatcoat, or Kaputrock, was dark blue from 1790 and had regimental colored collars and cuffs.

For stable and street duties, troopers wore unbleached drill and a white forage cap with a red band and tassel, later replaced by blue versions as blue greatcoats were introduced in 1790. In 1808, a stall jacket replaced the traditional Kittel. NCOs had specific uniform distinctions, such as black and white cords on hats, special feather plumes, sword knots, and rosettes. They also carried sticks for guard duties and wore ankle-length leather trousers. Officers' Kolletts were generally white with velvet collars and cuffs, trimmed in silver or gold, except in Regiment No. 12, where they were yellow. Officers had embroidered gala tunics, and off duty wore either a dark blue single-breasted Leibrock or a white Interimsrock.

For dragoons, light blue tunics were worn, with distinctions in facing and button colors. Uniforms became narrower and less elaborate over time for economy, with higher, stiffened collars from 1799 and cartridge box belts repositioned in 1797. The Kollett replaced the infantry-style tunic in 1802, and lapels and cuffs retained regimental colors. Waistcoats were mostly yellow, though color variation existed. In 1801, tailed jackets were withdrawn in favor of a tailless white underjacket; false waistcoats were sewn into tunics. Hussar regiments wore either colpacks or mirlitons as headwear, transitioning to shakos from 1804, though in the 1806 campaign, a mix of headwear remained. Plumes and cords were color-coded by rank and squadron. The dolman and pelisse were heavily decorated, with variations in frogging, trimming, and fur according to regiment and rank. Overalls and boots followed Hungarian style, and greatcoats varied in color, with most regiments using white.

After 1806, significant changes included the reintroduction of cuirasses in 1814–15, the adoption of new helmet styles, and further adjustments to uniforms, especially for cuirassiers and dragoons. The cuirassiers' Kollett remained double-breasted with high collars until 1814, when a shorter collar was introduced. Helmets replaced tricorns in 1808, and the use of plumes became more consistent. Officers used epaulettes from 1812, and on campaign, the Litewka coat became standard for men. Dragoons continued to wear blue Kolletts, and line regiments used a black felt shako, with plumes indicating rank. Hussars' uniforms evolved in color and decoration, with changes in the distribution of shoulder cords, fur trim, and plume styles. Uhlans and Guard cavalry adopted distinct dark blue uniforms with red or yellow details, and their headwear—a czapka or shako—was highly decorative, with plumes, cords, and badges indicating rank and regiment.

== Reform ==
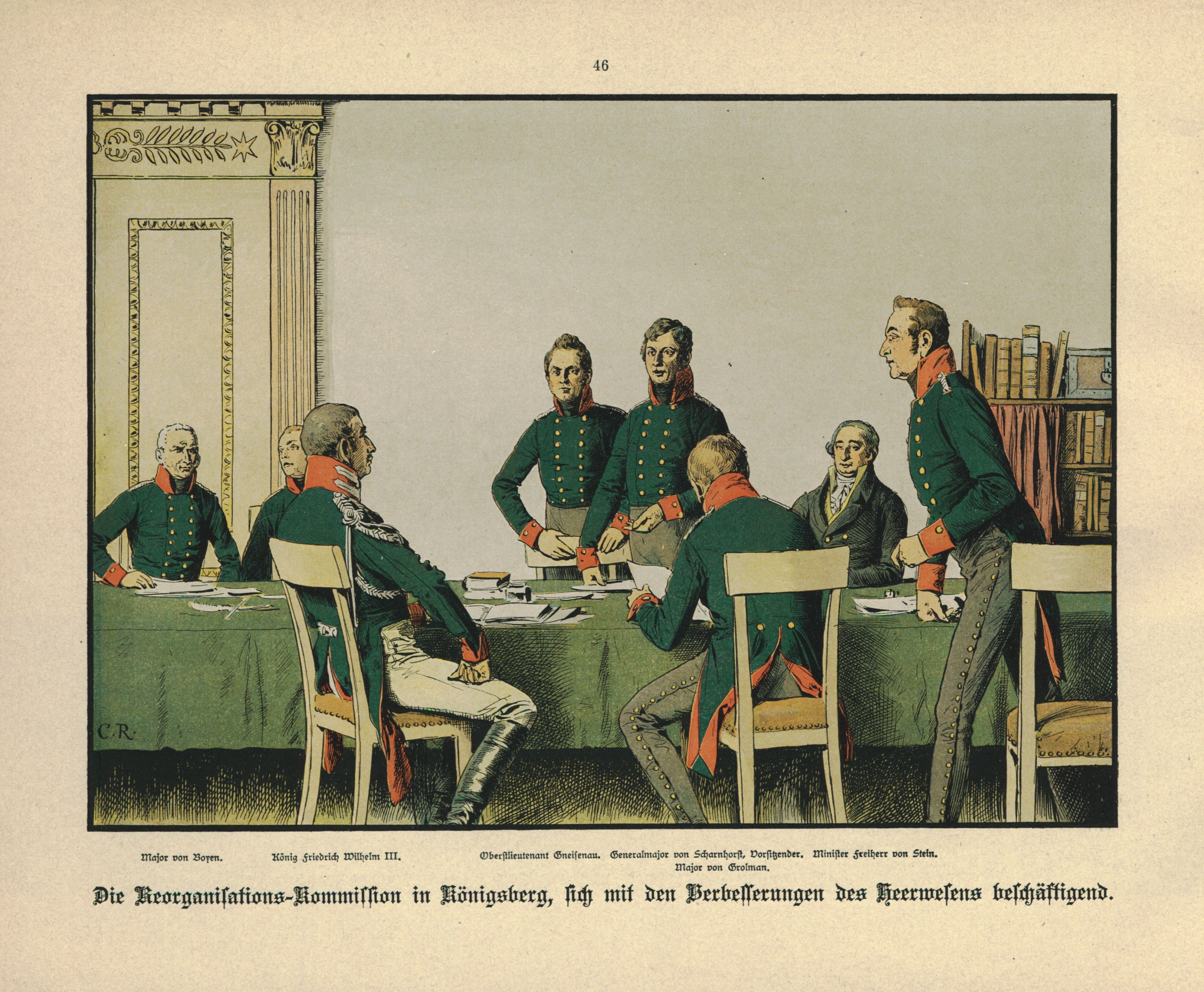
Meeting of the reformers in Königsberg in 1807, by Carl Röchling

The reform attempts in Prussia between 1801 and 1805 were too limited and failed to address the fundamental decline of the Frederickian military system. As a result, the Russo-Prussian defeats at Jena, Auerstedt, and Friedland were not averted, ultimately forcing the kingdom to accept harsh terms from Napoleon in the Treaty of Tilsit. The resistance of the king, his cabinet, and the nobility to reform, combined with public detachment from both the state and army, and a lack of effective military preparations, made Prussia's military collapse in 1806 and 1807 almost unavoidable. A successful reform process required two preconditions: the reformers needed credibility with the crown, and a genuine connection between the army, the state, and the people had to be established. Without these, the necessary military reforms could not take hold, and the reformers' ambitions for a professional, citizen-based army and a rejuvenated general staff remained unrealized.

The Prussian General Staff entered the 1806 campaign as a fragmented and ineffective body, unable to provide unified leadership or direction, which proved to be a fatal weakness in the face of Napoleon's forces. The war was waged under poor conditions and led to disastrous results, marking a failed debut for what would become the renowned Prussian General Staff. Despite these failures, reformers managed to make some progress after the defeat. The king established a Superior Investigating Commission in late 1807 to examine the capitulations of fortresses and armies, and a Military Reorganization Commission in July 1807 tasked with investigating the campaign, punishing misconduct, and recommending changes in organization, supply, officer selection, and training. The reformers shifted their attention from judging the old officer corps to improving the future one, advocating for the end of the aristocratic monopoly on commissions and for the admission of talented middle-class candidates based on educational merit. Scharnhorst and his colleagues argued that social class should not determine military leadership, and these ideas were supported by influential figures like Stein.

The king, still disappointed by the failures of the aristocracy, did not oppose the reformers' plans. Grolman developed a new system for officer selection, formalized in August 1808, which required all candidates to meet educational standards in peacetime and prove bravery and skill in wartime. Social preference in officer appointments was officially abolished, and all eligible men could compete for commissions. Young men could become officer candidates after serving three months in the ranks and passing examinations, a process that extended to higher promotions as well. Although conservatives resisted these changes, fearing the loss of traditional privileges and the undermining of the personal relationship between the monarch and his officers, the reformers' system prevailed, at least in principle. The king reserved the right to appoint commanding officers, and it was emphasized that character and practical ability remained essential, preventing an excessive focus on academic achievement alone.

The reformers' breakthrough opened the officer corps to the middle classes and reinforced Stein's parallel efforts to reduce social barriers and inequalities. Old military schools were closed and replaced by new institutions in Berlin, Königsberg (now Kaliningrad), and Breslau (today Wrocław), offering nine-month courses for aspiring officers. A superior military academy, the forerunner of the later Kriegsakademie, was established in Berlin, providing advanced training for selected officers in a wide range of military and academic subjects. This academy became a recruiting ground for the General Staff, with figures like Clausewitz gaining early distinction. While debate continued about the balance between scholarly and practical qualities in officers, the reforms clearly raised the overall educational standards in the army.

Reorganizing the entire army proved more difficult. Prussia, having lost significant territory and barred from recruiting foreigners, now had to rely entirely on native manpower. Financial constraints and uncertainty about Napoleon's restrictions complicated planning. The Treaty of Tilsit had set the army's size at 42,000 men and the treaty of Paris had outlawed extraordinary defense measures or the creation of a civil guard, seriously hindering the reformers' desire for a national militia. Reformers advocated for universal liability for military service and the elimination of all exemptions, but the old canton system persisted until 1813, preventing any real increase in army numbers. Attempts to expand the army relied on the Krümper system, whereby each company rotated small numbers of men through training, creating a pool of reserves and marking the start of short-term compulsory service in Prussia. However, the Krümper system was not fully implemented until 1809, was interrupted in 1811, and proved less effective than legend suggests. By 1813, the regular army and reserves numbered only about 66,000 men.

Other important reforms included abolishing corporal punishment, updating training and tactics to include skirmisher techniques, and integrating infantry, cavalry, and artillery into combined arms operations. Equipment was modernized, and new field manuals emphasized flexibility and speed. In 1809, a Ministry of War was established, influenced by Stein's administrative reforms, to unify command and replace older, fragmented military authorities. The Ministry of War was divided into departments for general military affairs and military economy, each with specific responsibilities for personnel, training, logistics, and finance. Scharnhorst led the General Department of War and acted as Chief of the General Staff, while Lottum headed the Military Economy Department. Although the king withheld the appointment of a single Minister of War until 1814, the new ministry operated effectively under Scharnhorst's leadership, consolidating authority and reducing the confusion that had prevailed under the old system. The Ministry of War provided the unity and administrative coherence that had been lacking, absorbing the roles of previous agencies and improving the army's overall organization.

== French invasion of Russia ==
The Franco-Prussian treaty of 1812 forced Prussia to provide 20,000 troops to Napoleon's Grande Armée, first under the leadership of Julius von Grawert and then under Yorck. The French occupation of Prussia was reaffirmed, and 300 demoralized Prussian officers, including Carl von Clausewitz, resigned in protest.

During Napoleon's retreat from Russia in 1812, Yorck independently signed the Convention of Tauroggen with Russia, breaking the Franco-Prussian alliance. The Convention of Tauroggen became the starting-point of Prussia's regeneration. As the news of the destruction of the Grande Armée spread, and the appearance of countless stragglers convinced the Prussian people of the reality of the disaster, the spirit generated by years of French domination burst out. For the moment the King and his ministers were placed in a position of the greatest anxiety, for they knew the resources of France and the boundless versatility of their arch-enemy far too well to imagine that the end of their sufferings was yet in sight. To disavow the acts and desires of the army and of the secret societies for defence with which all north Germany was honeycombed would be to imperil the very existence of the monarchy, whilst an attack on the wreck of the Grand Army meant the certainty of a terrible retribution from the new armies now rapidly forming on the Rhine.

But the Russians and the soldiers were resolved to continue the campaign, and working in collusion they put pressure on the not unwilling representatives of the civil power to facilitate the supply and equipment of such troops as were still in the field; they could not refuse food and shelter to their starving countrymen or their loyal allies, and thus by degrees the French garrisons scattered about the country either found themselves surrounded or were compelled to retire to avoid that fate. Thus it happened that the viceroy of Italy Eugène de Beauharnais felt himself compelled to depart from the positive injunctions of Napoleon to hold on at all costs to his advanced position at Posen, where about 14,000 men had gradually rallied around him, and to withdraw step by step to Magdeburg, where he met reinforcements and commanded the whole course of the lower Elbe.

Stein arrived in East Prussia and led the raising of Landwehr (militia) to defend the province. With Prussia's joining of the Sixth Coalition out of his hands, Frederick William III quickly began to mobilize the army, and the East Prussian Landwehr was duplicated in the rest of the country. In comparison to 1806, the Prussian populace, especially the middle class, was supportive of the war, and thousands of volunteers joined the army. Prussian troops under the leadership of Blücher and Gneisenau proved vital at the Battles of Leipzig (1813) and Waterloo (1815). Later staff officers were impressed with the simultaneous operations of separate groups of the Prussian Army.

== Wars of Liberation ==
The Iron Cross was introduced as a military decoration by King Frederick William III in 1813. The Prussian, and later German General Staff, which developed out of meetings of the Great Elector with his senior officers and the informal meeting of the Napoleonic era reformers, was formally created in 1814. In the same year Boyen and Grolman drafted a law for universal conscription, by which men would successively serve in the standing army, the Landwehr, and the local Landsturm until the age of 39. Troops of the 136,000-strong standing army served for three years and were in the reserves for two, while militiamen of the 163,000-strong Landwehr served a few weeks annually for seven years. Boyen and Blücher strongly supported the 'civilian army' of the Landwehr, which was to unite military and civilian society, as an equal to the standing army.

After the publication of his On War, Clausewitz became a widely studied philosopher of war.

== Hundred Days ==
=== Prussian Army (Army of the Lower Rhine) ===
This army was composed entirely of Prussians from the provinces of the Kingdom of Prussia, old and recently acquired alike. Field Marshal Gebhard Leberecht von Blücher commanded this army with General August Neidhardt von Gneisenau as his chief of staff and second in command.

Blücher's Prussian army of 116,000 men, with headquarters at Namur, was distributed as follows:

- I Corps (Graf von Zieten), 30,800, cantoned along the Sambre, headquartered at Charleroi, and covering the area Fontaine-l'Évêque–Fleurus–Moustier.
- II Corps (Pirch I), 31,000, headquartered at Namur, lay in the area Namur–Hannut–Huy.
- III Corps (Thielemann), 23,900, in the bend of the river Meuse, headquartered at Ciney, and disposed in the area Dinant–Huy–Ciney.
- IV Corps (Bülow), 30,300, with headquarters at Liège and cantoned around it.

=== German Corps (North German Federal Army) ===
This army was part of the Prussian Army above, but was to act independently much further south. It was composed of contingents from the following states of the German Confederation: Electorate of Hessen, Grand Duchy of Mecklenburg-Schwerin, Grand Duchy of Mecklenburg-Strelitz, Grand Duchy of Saxe-Weimar-Eisenach, Grand Duchy of Oldenburg, Duchy of Saxe-Gotha, Duchy of Anhalt-Bernburg, Duchy of Anhalt-Dessau, Duchy of Anhalt-Kothen, Principality of Schwarzburg-Rudolstadt, Principality of Schwarzburg-Sondershausen, Principality of Waldeck and Pyrmont, Principality of Lippe and the Principality of Schaumburg-Lippe.

Fearing that Napoleon was going to strike him first, Blücher ordered this army to march north to join the rest of his own army.The Prussian General Friedrich Graf Kleist von Nollendorf initially commanded this army before he fell ill on 18 June and was replaced by the Hessen-Kassel General Wilhelm von Engelhardt. Its composition in June was:

- Hessen-Kassel Division (Three Hessian Brigades) – General von Engelhardt
- Thuringian Brigade – Colonel Egloffstein
- Mecklenburg Brigade – General Prince of Mecklenburg-Schwerin

Total 25,000

=== Prussian Reserve Army ===
Besides the four Army Corps that fought in the Waterloo Campaign listed above that Blücher took with him into the United Kingdom of the Netherlands, Prussia also had a reserve army stationed at home in order to defend its borders.

This consisted of:

- V Army Corps – Commanded by General Ludwig Yorck von Wartenburg
- VI Army Corps – Commanded by General Bogislav Friedrich Emanuel von Tauentzien
- Royal Guard (VIII Corps) – Commanded by General Charles II, Grand Duke of Mecklenburg-Strelitz

== See also ==
- Military history of Germany
- Prussian Army § Napoleonic era
