= Gilbert Bachelu =

Gilbert Désiré Joseph Bachelu
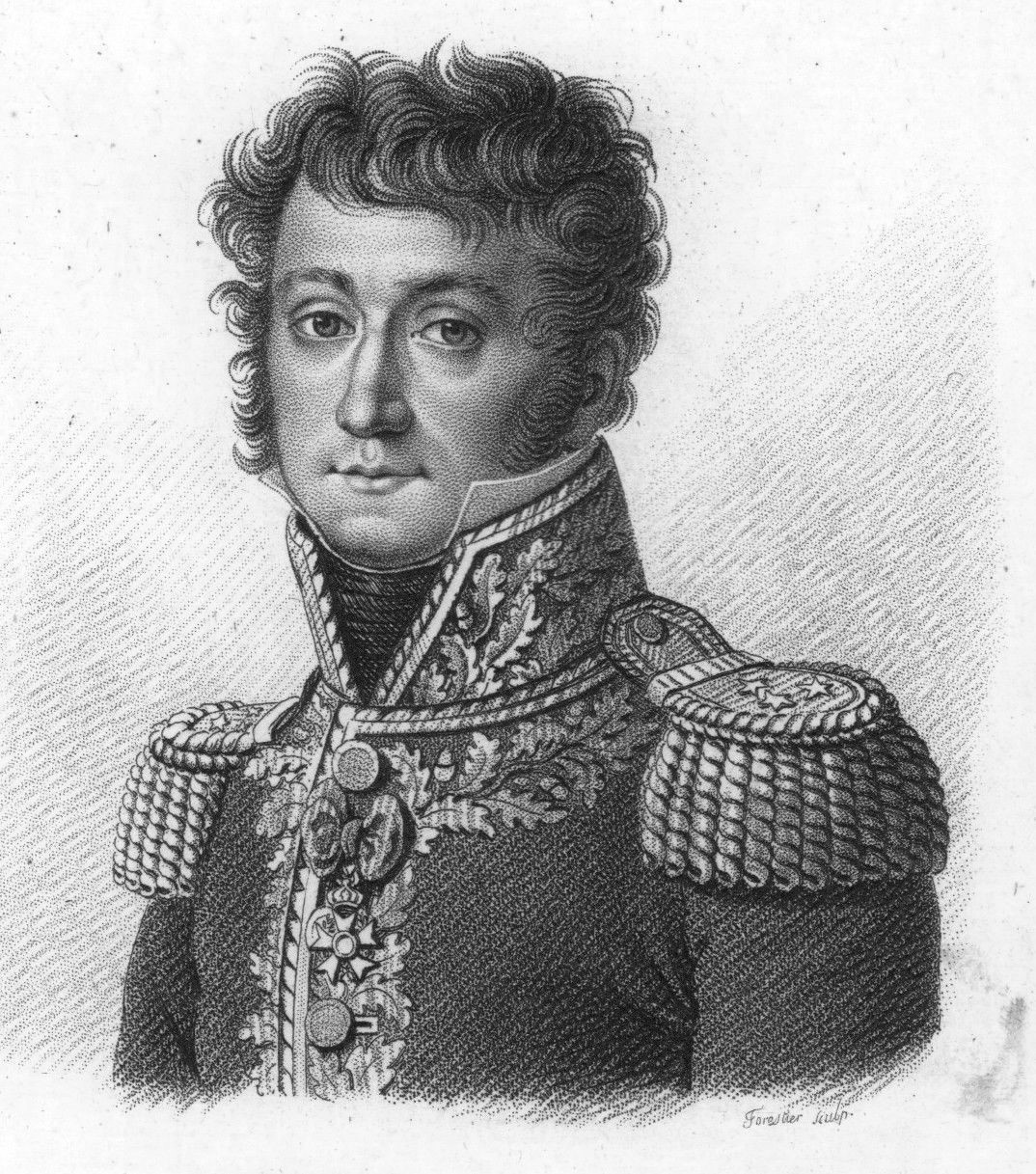
- Gilbert Désiré Joseph Bachelu
- Born: 9 February 1777; Dole, Jura, France
- Died: 16 June 1849 (aged 72) Paris, France
- Allegiance: France
- Branch: Engineers, Infantry
- Service years: 1794–1815
- Rank: General of Division
- Conflicts: War of the First Coalition; Rhine Campaign of 1796; War of the Second Coalition; Egyptian Campaign; Saint-Domingue expedition; War of the Third Coalition; Battle of Austerlitz; War of the Fifth Coalition; Dalmatian Campaign; Battle of Wagram; War of the Sixth Coalition; Siege of Danzig; Hundred Days; Battle of Quatre Bras; Battle of Waterloo
- Awards: Légion d'Honneur, CC, 1830; Order of Saint Louis, 1814
- Other work: Chamber of Deputies, 1830

Gilbert Désiré Joseph, baron Bachelu (French pronunciation: [ʒilbɛʁ deziʁe ʒozɛf baʃly]; 9 February 1777 – 16 June 1849) was a French division commander during the Napoleonic Wars. In 1795 he graduated from the artillery and engineering school and was posted to the Army of the Rhine, serving in the Rhine Campaign of 1796. He fought in the French campaign in Egypt and Syria and then went on the Saint-Domingue expedition in 1802. He received command of an infantry regiment and fought at Austerlitz in 1805. He led a brigade in the Dalmatian Campaign and at Wagram in 1809. He was besieged and captured at Danzig in 1813. He joined Napoleon during the Hundred Days and led a division at Quatre Bras and Waterloo in 1815. Imprisoned for a time by the Bourbon Restoration he won election to the Chamber of Deputies in 1830. He died of cholera in 1849.
