= Julius von Grawert =

General in Prussian Army

Julius August Reinhold von Grawert
- Born: 28 December 1746; Königsberg, Kingdom of Prussia
- Died: 18 September 1821 (aged 74); Landeck, Kingdom of Prussia
- Military career
- Allegiance: Kingdom of Prussia
- Branch: Prussian Army
- Service years: 1759–1820
- Rank: General der Infanterie
- Commands: Prussian Auxiliary Corps
- Conflicts: Third Silesian War; War of the Bavarian Succession; Napoleonic Wars
- Awards: Pour le Merite; Order of the Black Eagle

Julius August Reinhold von Grawert (1746–1821) was a Prussian general. During the Battle of Jena-Auerstedt on 14 October 1806, he led a division under Frederick Louis, Prince of Hohenlohe-Ingelfingen at Jena. As Generalleutnant, Grawert commanded the Prussian auxiliary corps attached to French Emperor Napoleon I's Grande Armée during the French invasion of Russia. Grawert was replaced by Ludwig Yorck von Wartenburg in 1812. He retired in 1820 to Silesia.

== Biography ==
Julius August Reinhold von Grawert was born on 28 December 1746 in Königsberg, East Prussia. He was the son of Johann Benjamin von Grawert (1709–1759) and his wife Christiane Sophie von Grawert (née von Schollenstern) (1717–1796). Young von Grawert entered military service in 1759, during the Third Silesian War, when he enlisted for 12 years and right in time for the Battle of Kunersdorf. After the Peace of Hubertusburg, he was commissioned as a Premier-Leutnant in the Infantry Regiment von Tauenzien in Breslau.

At the beginning of the War of the Bavarian Succession, in 1778, he was adjutant to the crown prince of Brunswick, Ferdinand.

When the transformation of the army was proposed after the death of Frederick the Great, then Major Grawert was drafted to Berlin and worked there for several months to establish a military college, but in 1788 he was transferred to the Infantry Regiment Duke of Brunswick in Halberstadt and soon promoted to lieutenant colonel.

In 1790 he became a quartermaster on the general staff, and in this position he served until the French Revolutionary Wars. On 28 January 1793 he was promoted to colonel and, when Quartermaster General Theodore von Pfau was killed at the Battle of Trippstadt, Grawert replaced him. Both Prussian commanders, the Duke of Brunswick and Field Marshal Möllendorf, were completely pleased with him; and he became famous in the battles and campaigns of the First Coalition, proving his talents as a practical warrior and as a war writer.

After the Peace of Basel Grawert remained in the General Staff, and, on 7 July 1798, was promoted to major general.

In 1800 he became inspector of the six infantry regiments located in Upper Silesia and, in 1804, he was made Governeur of Glatz. On 29 May 1805 he was promoted to lieutenant general.

In 1806, during the War of the Fourth Coalition, Grawert commanded an infantry division and participated in the Battle of Jena. After the Treaties of Tilsit, he was appointed Governor-General of Silesia. In this position Grawert managed to win the respect of the French generals and of Napoleon himself. The later requested him as commander of the Prussian Auxiliary Corps which, as part of Jacques MacDonald's X Corps of the Grande Armee, participated in the French invasion of Russia in 1812. Early in the campaign Grawert commanded his corps at Ekau. There he fell off his horse and broke his leg, forcing him to relinquish command to Lieutenant General Ludwig Yorck.

There is a widespread rumor in literature that Grawert was sharply opposed to the French, and a broken leg was only a pretence to leave the army.

Grawert went back to Silesia, was promoted to General der Infanterie and never served in the field again. He spent the last years of his life in his estate at Landeck, in the County of Kladsko, and, having fully retired the year before, died on 18 September 1821.

Grawert's correspondence with the Duke of Brunswick, which contains a description of events for about thirty years, is considered a notable source on the military history of Prussia during the late 18th and early 19th centuries.
