= Friedrich von Löwis of Menar =

Russian lieutenant-general (1767–1824)

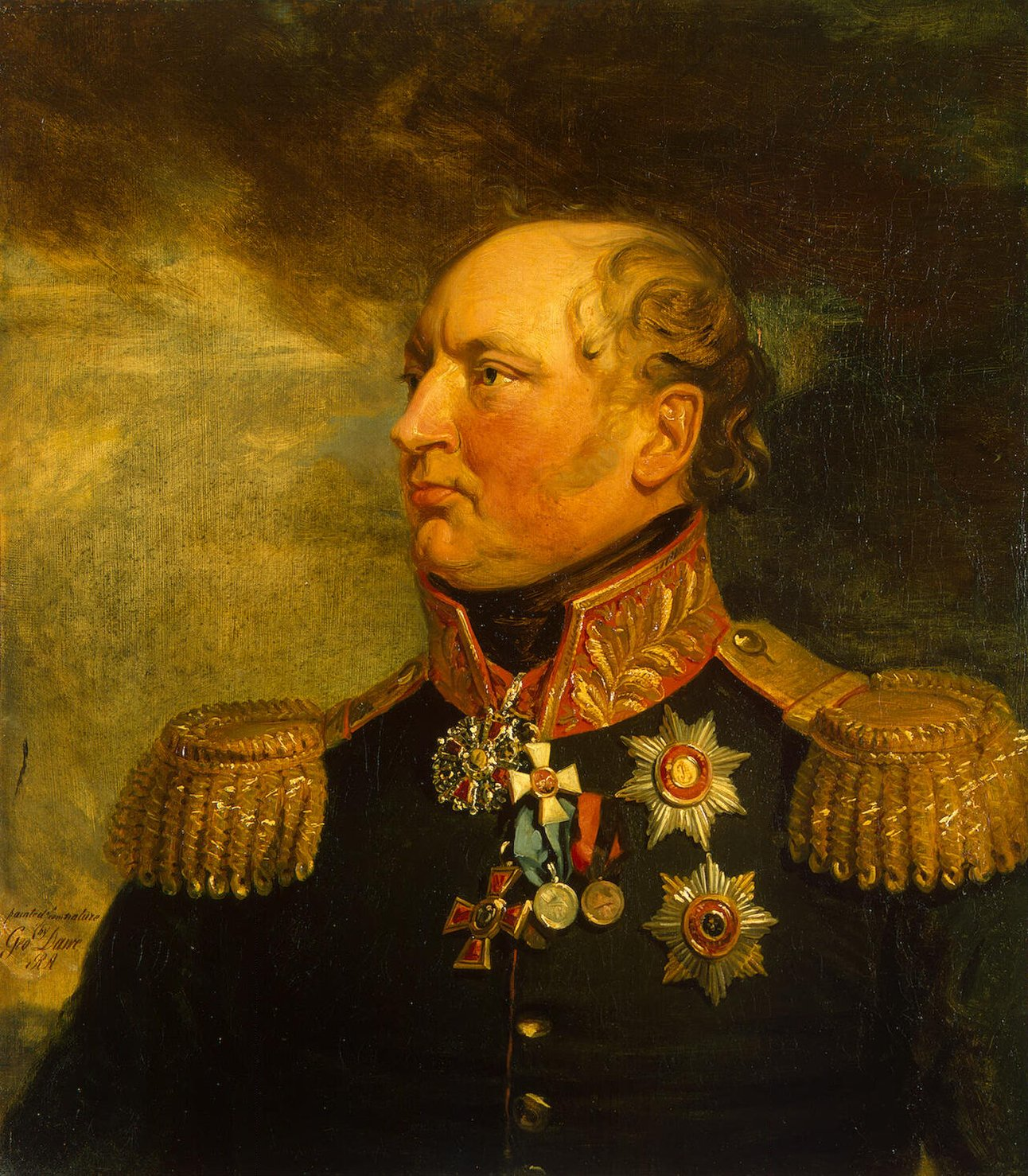
- Portrait by George Dawe, before 1825
- Born: 6 September [O.S. 26 August] 1767; Hapsal, Reval Governorate, Russian Empire
- Died: 16 April [O.S. 4 April] 1824 (aged 57); Kreis Wolmar, Governorate of Livonia, Russian Empire
- Burial place: Salisberg
- Military career
- Allegiance: Russia
- Branch: Imperial Russian Army
- Service years: 1772–1814
- Rank: Lieutenant general
- Conflicts: Napoleonic Wars; Siege of Danzig
- Awards: Order of St. George 3rd class, Order of St. Alexander Nevsky, Order of St. Vladimir 2nd class, Order of St. Anna 1st class with diamonds, Gold Sword for Bravery with diamonds

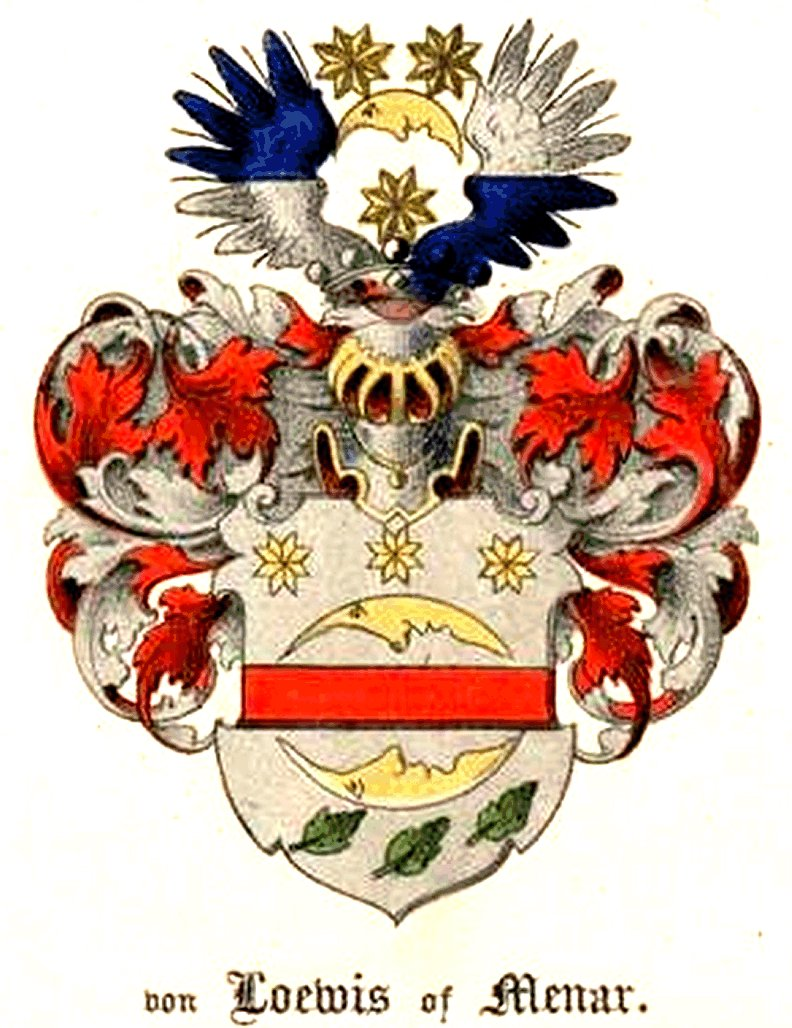
Family coat of arms of the von Löwis of Menar

Friedrich von Löwis of Menar (Russian: Фёдор Фёдорович Левиз, romanized: Fyodor Fyodorovich Leviz; 6 September [O.S. 26 August] 1767 – 16 April [O.S. 4 April] 1824) was a Russian lieutenant-general of Scottish origin, who served in the Imperial Russian Army during the Napoleonic Wars. His family (the family name commonly spelled in English as Lewis) came from South Scotland to Sweden around 1630. By the time of Friedrich's birth, it had become a well-established noble family settled in Livonia in the Russian Empire.
