= Siege of Danzig (1813) =

1813 siege of Danzig during the War of the Sixth Coalition

- Part of the German campaign of the Sixth Coalition
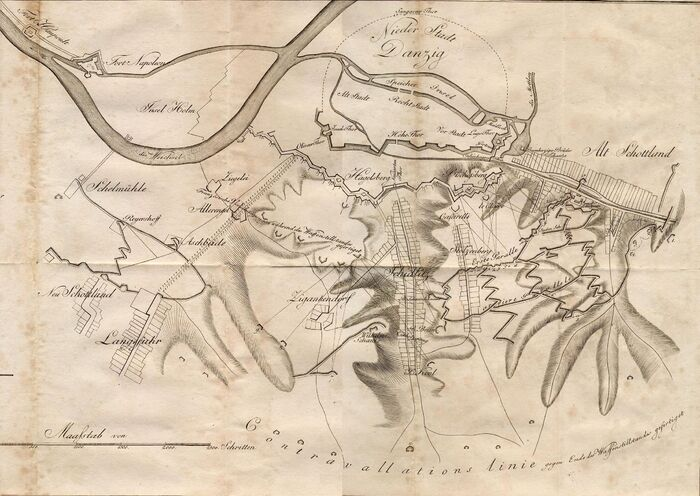
- Danzig (Plan of the siege in 1813)
Date	16 January 1813 – 2 January 1814
Location	Free City of Danzig 54°22′00″N 18°38′00″E
Result	Russo–Prussian victory

Belligerents
(First French Empire) French Empire; Confederation of the Rhine; Kingdom of Bavaria; Kingdom of Saxony	(Kingdom of Prussia) Prussia; Russian Empire

Commanders and leaders
(First French Empire) Jean Rapp (POW) (First French Empire) Étienne Heudelet (First French Empire) Charles Grandjean	(Russian Empire) Duke of Württemberg (Russian Empire) Matvei Platov (Russian Empire) Fyodor Lewis

Casualties and losses
14 generals and 15,000 soldiers captured	Unknown

The siege of Danzig (16 January 1813 – 2 January 1814) was a siege of the city of Danzig during the War of the Sixth Coalition by Russian and Prussian forces against Jean Rapp's permanent French garrison, which had been augmented by soldiers from the Grande Armée retreating from its Russian campaign. The garrison included two crack divisions under Étienne Heudelet de Bierre and Charles Louis Dieudonné Grandjean plus whole units and stragglers that had lost contact with their units, all with their health and morale both weakened and most of their equipment lost and carrying their wounded. The siege was begun by Cossacks under hetman Matvei Platov, then was continued mainly by infantry, mainly militiamen and irregulars. It ended in a French surrender to Coalition forces.

The Treaty of Tilsit of 1807 had made Danzig a Free City nominally under Prussian control. It was sited at the mouth of the River Vistula and along the coast of the Baltic Sea and then had 60,000 inhabitants. It was also a major supply depot for Napoleon's force, with large quantities of food, munitions, forage, weapons, clothing and ammunition, and needed to be held by his forces to keep the Prussians neutral and avoid them defecting to the coalition (as they later did). He was also attempting to re-group an army in his rear in order to confront the Coalition, and so needed to guard the line of the Vistula by garrisoning Danzig, Thorn and Warsaw.
