= Johan Arnold Bloys van Treslong =

Dutch naval officer

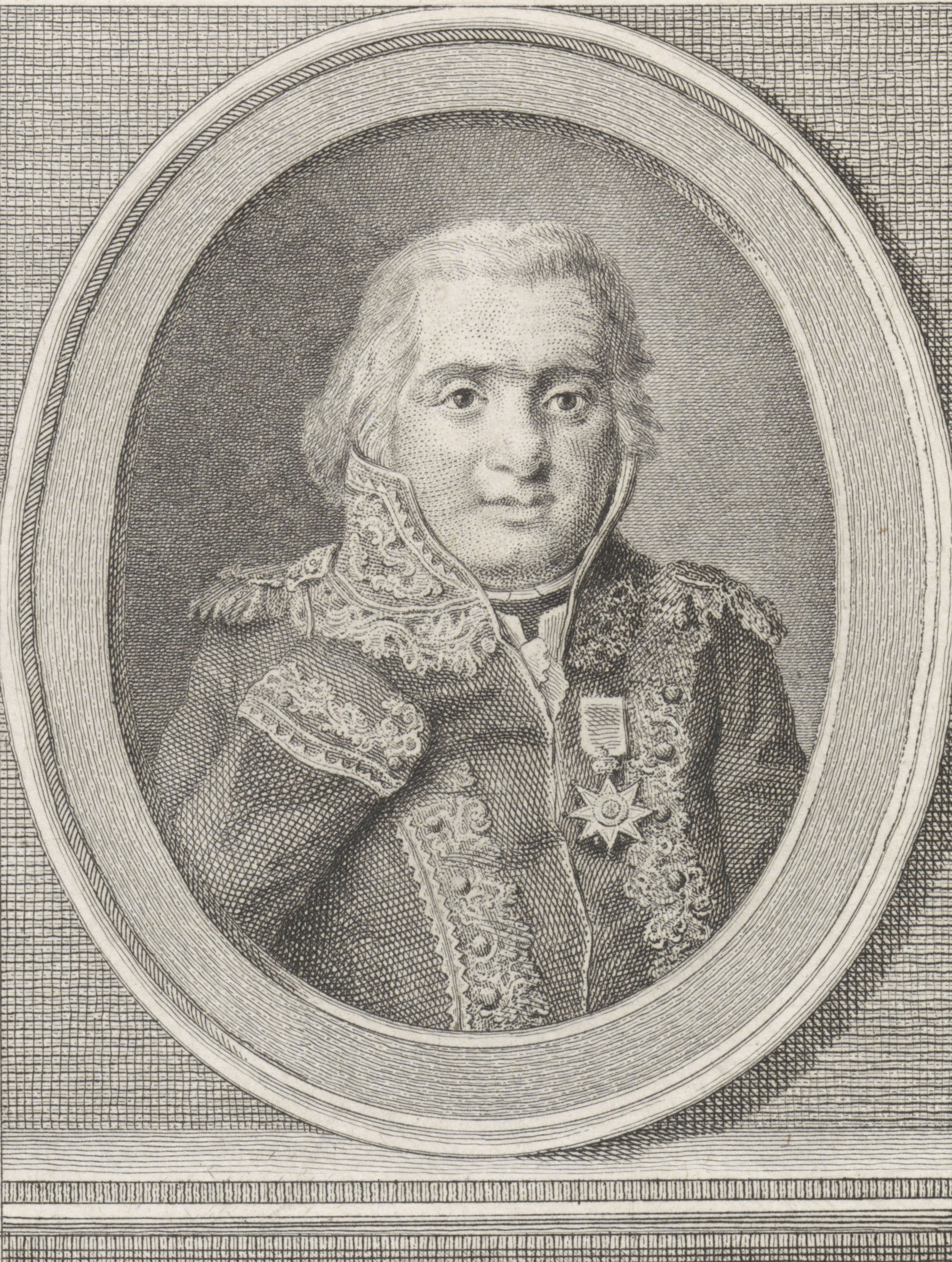
19th-century illustration of van Treslong

Vice-Admiral Johan Arnold Bloys van Treslong (8 November 1757 – 26 January 1824) was a Dutch naval officer. He started his naval career in 1772, serving as a midshipman with the Admiralty of the Maze. He served in the Dutch States Navy on the North Sea, in the West Indies and in battle with Barbary pirates in the Mediterranean.

In 1781, he fought in the action of 30 May 1781 under the command of Pieter Melvill van Carnbee, and from 1782 till 1787 he was commander of several ships in the Mediterranean. He was laid off in 1787 because of his support for the Patriots' faction. This ill-favouredness lasted until 1793. After the ringing Dutch defeat during the Battle of Camperdown in 1797 he was made a scapegoat, but his reputation was later restored.

== The Battle of Camperdown (Kamperduin) ==
Flying his flag aboard the 74-gun ship of the line Brutus, Treslong escorted the squadron of commander-in-chief of the Batavian fleet, Vice admiral Jan Willem de Winter (1761–1812), as Schout-bij-nacht of the "White flag", on 7 October 1797. The committee of the Navy and the committee of Foreign Affairs had ordered the fleet to break the Royal Navy blockade of the Dutch coast. At Camperdown, the Dutch fleet engaged a much stronger British fleet under Admiral Adam Duncan.

Duncan acted in a manner that was imitated later by Nelson at Trafalgar; he thinned out the poorly coordinated and badly sailing Batavian fleet. The British ships set a perpendicular course towards the Batavian ships and shot them to pieces. The flagship Vrijheid (Freedom) was boxed in by four British ships, and one after the other the Batavian ships were devastated by the excellently navigating and firing British.

Bloys van Treslong could not reach the flagship because it was located against the wind, and because he was impeded by a burning and rudderless Dutch ship, the 74-gun Hercules. A cannonball shattered the rear admiral's right arm, which had to be amputated.

The British fleet gained a resounding victory; eleven Batavian ships were captured (among which were nine ships of the line), and there were almost 5,000 Dutch casualties. On the British side, not one ship was lost, but more than 850 casualties were counted. For the first time in history, a Dutch Admiral had been personally captured along with his flagship. Admiral De Winter and his crew were taken prisoner and were brought to Great Yarmouth. The rear-guard under Bloys van Treslong, by then reduced to three heavily damaged ships, managed to sail to Hellevoetsluis.

== Consequences of the Battle of Camperdown ==
The Batavian Republic had been deeply shocked by the defeat. In the eyes of the parliament, the press nor the public opinion was the government (the Staatsbewind) was not to blame—although responsible for sending a fleet that was too weak—and Admiral de Winter was considered a hero. That Bloys van Treslong was an aristocrat did not improve his popularity in this revolutionary period, and thus all the blame fell on the Rear Admiral. Supposedly, he had navigated poorly and had given the British the opportunity to cut through the Dutch line as a scythe; he was also accused of not having assisted the surrounded De Vrijheid. He had to appear before the naval high tribunal.

The court-martial cleared Admiral de Winter of all responsibility for what had happened, although other officers got a disciplinary sentence. In the eyes of the military judges Johan Arnold Bloys van Treslong was solely to blame for the defeat at Camperdown. In spite of a competent defence and convincing arguments to the contrary, he was declared guilty and sentenced to up to five years' suspension and payment of a part of the process costs. It took more than ten years for Bloys van Treslong to be rehabilitated under the reign of king Louis Bonaparte.

== Rehabilitation ==
Rehabilitation took place on 18 October 1808 in the form of an appointment as (titular) vice admiral. On that very day he was honourably dismissed and pensioned at the age of 61. He was also dubbed knight in the "Order of the Union", an honour which he shared with his relatives Cornelis Ysaac, Jacob Arnout and Willem Otto.

== Relatives ==
Bloys of Treslong is a family that descended from a bastard son of count John of Beaumont, younger brother of count William III of Holland. The Bloys of Treslong included four flag officers in the Dutch Navy.

- Willem Bloys van Treslong (1529–1594), a captain of the Gueux de mer
- Jacob Arnout Bloys van Treslong (1756–1826), also called Jacob Arnold Bastingius, was a Secretary-General of the Dutch Navy
- Johan Arnold Bloys van Treslong (1757–1824). Schout-bij-nacht at the Battle of Kamperduin.
- Jhr. William Otto Bloys van Treslong (1765–1837), an uncle of Johan Arnold.

Additionally:

- Cornelius Ysaac Bloys van Treslong (1763–1826) made it to Captain in the Batavian and Dutch Navy.
