= HMS Director =

Ship of the line of the Royal Navy

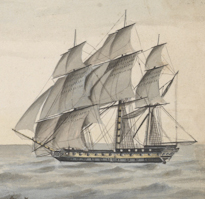
- HMS Director

History

Great Britain
- Name: HMS Director
- Ordered: 2 August 1780
- Builder: Clevely, Gravesend
- Laid down: November 1779
- Launched: 9 March 1784
- Fate: Broken up, Chatham, January 1801
- Notes: Participated in: Battle of Camperdown

General characteristics
- Class & type: 64-gun St Albans-class ship of the line
- Tons burthen: 1388 (bm)
- Length: 159 ft (48.5 m) (gundeck)
- Beam: 44 ft 4 in (13.5 m)
- Depth of hold: 18 ft 10 in (5.7 m)
- Propulsion: Sails
- Sail plan: Full-rigged ship
- Armament: Gundeck: 26 × 24-pounder guns; Upper gundeck: 26 × 18-pounder guns; QD: 10 × 4-pounder guns; Fc: 2 × 9-pounder guns

HMS Director was a 64-gun third rate ship of the line of the Royal Navy, launched on 9 March 1784 at Gravesend. She was laid down speculatively in November 1779, and ordered by the Navy the following year.

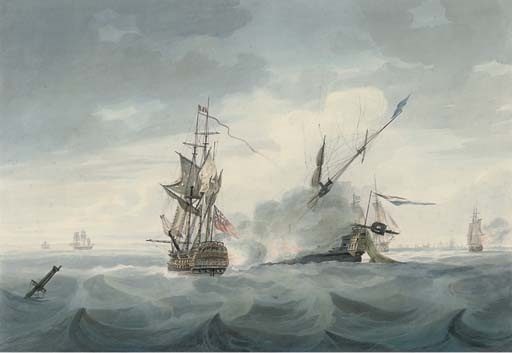
Director, raking the Dutch flagship Vrijheid, during the Battle of Camperdown, 11 October 1797

In 1797 Director was under the command of Captain William Bligh. In early 1797 he surveyed the Humber, preparing a map of the stretch from Spurn to the west of Sunk Island. In May, the crew mutinied during the Nore mutiny. The mutiny was not triggered by any specific actions by Bligh. On 12 October she took part in the Battle of Camperdown, where she captured the Dutch commander, Vice-Admiral Jan de Winter, and his flagship, Vrijheid.

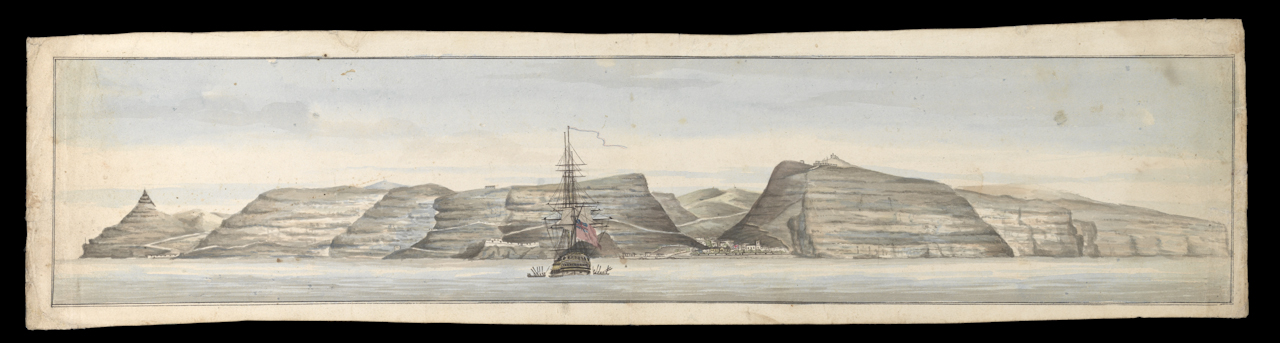
H.M.S. Director 1784, at St Helena with a view of Jamestown

== Fate ==
Director was decommissioned in July 1800 and broken up at Chatham in January 1801.
