= Dutch ship Willem de Eerste =

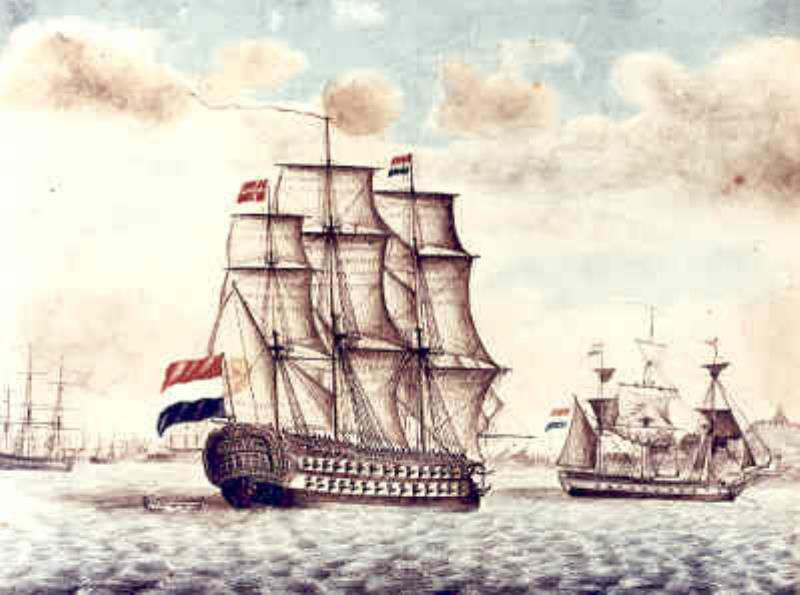
- 1785 painting of Willem de Eerste

History

Dutch Republic
- Name: Willem de Eerste
- Laid down: 1782
- Launched: 1785
- Commissioned: 1785
- Decommissioned: 1795

Batavian Republic
- Name: Brutus
- In service: 1795
- Out of service: 1813
- Renamed: Braband in 1806

History

Kingdom of the Netherlands
- Name: Braband
- Commissioned: 1813
- Decommissioned: 1820
- Fate: Broken up, 1820

General characteristics
- Class & type: 74-gun ship of the line
- Propulsion: Sails
- Sail plan: Full-rigged ship
- Armament: Lower gundeck: 28 × 36-pounder guns; Upper gundeck: 28 × 24-pounder guns; Quarterdeck and Forecastle: 16 × 12-pounder guns

Willem de Eerste was a 74-gun ship of the line of the Dutch States Navy. The order to construct the ship was given by the Admiralty of Rotterdam. The ship was commissioned in 1785. In 1795, She was renamed Brutus and incorporated in the Batavian Navy.

On 11 October 1797, Brutus took part in the Battle of Camperdown under Johan Bloys van Treslong. A cannonball hit van Treslong's right arm, which had to be amputated. Brutus soon left the battle when she couldn't reach the flagship Vrijheid due to the burning ship Hercules blocking the way. After the battle, on 13 October Brutus was found by the British frigate HMS Endymion who attacked her. Brutus sailed deeper in the Dutch waters of the Goeree channel, resulting in Endymion ceasing her pursuit.

In 1806, Brutus was renamed Braband; in the same year, she was incorporated into the navy of the Kingdom of Holland. From 1811 to 1813, the ship was part of the French Imperial Navy, before becoming part the Royal Netherlands Navy in 1814. In 1815 she was fitted out to sail to the Dutch East Indies, but it soon became clear that her hull wasn't strong enough for the voyage, and she sailed no further than Portsmouth. The ship was eventually broken up in 1820.
