= HMS Camperdown =

Four ships of the Royal Navy and a divisions of the Royal Naval Reserve have been named HMS Camperdown after the Battle of Camperdown in 1797:

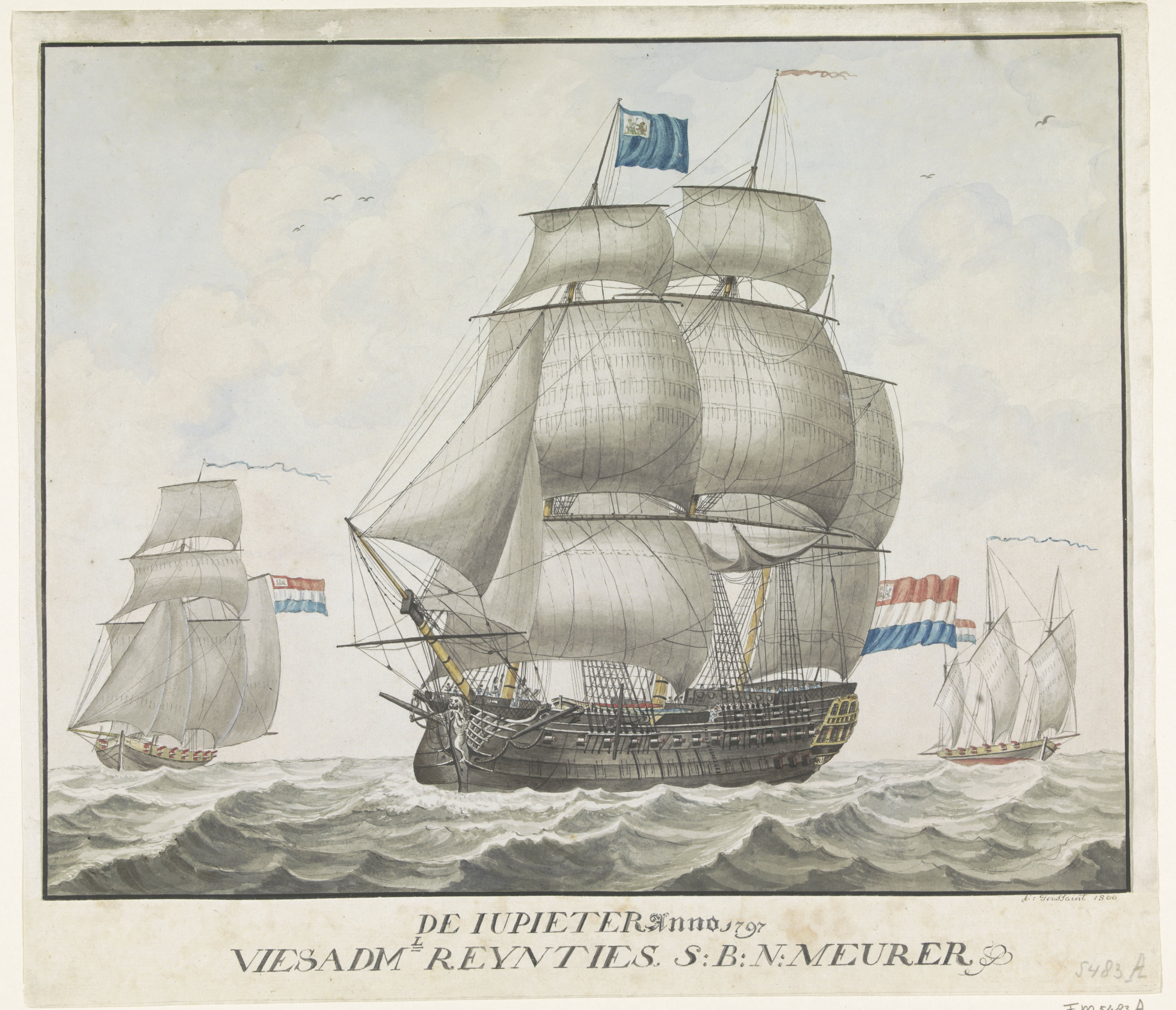
Dutch ship De Jupiter, renamed Camperdown in 1797

- HMS Camperdown (1797) was a 74-gun third-rate ship of the line, previously the Dutch Jupiter. She was captured at the Battle of Camperdown in 1797 but was not viable and was only used as a prison ship (for French prisoners) being sold out of the Royal Navy in 1817.
- HMS Camperdown was a 106-gun first rate launched in 1820 as HMS Trafalgar. She was renamed HMS Camperdown in 1825, was used for harbour service from 1854 and became a coal hulk in 1857. She was renamed HMS Pitt in 1882 and was sold in 1906.
- HMS Camperdown (1885) was an Admiral-class battleship launched in 1885, hulked in 1908 and sold in 1911.
- HMS Camperdown (D32) was a Battle-class destroyer launched in 1944 and broken up in 1970
- HMS Camperdown (RNR) was a Royal Naval Reserve training centre in Dundee supporting Tay Division between 21 October 1970 and 31 May 1994.
