= Dooitze Eelkes Hinxt =

Dutch naval officer (1741–1797)

- Born: c. 1741; Dokkum, Dutch Republic
- Died: 10 August 1797 (aged 55–56) Off Texel, North Sea
- Allegiance: Dutch Republic; Batavian Republic
- Branch: Dutch States Navy; Batavian Navy
- Service years: 1782–1797
- Rank: Captain at sea
- Conflicts: French Revolutionary Wars; Battle of Camperdown †

Captain-at-sea Dooitze Eelkes Hinxt (c. 1741 – 20 October 1797) was a Dutch naval officer who served in the French Revolutionary Wars. He was the son of Eelke Tabes Hinxt, a merchant captain from the city of Dokkum. Hinxt died on the ship of the line Beschermer of wounds received during the Battle of Camperdown.

== Merchant captain ==
Dooitze Eelkes Hinxt was born in a Roman Catholic family. His father was a merchant captain, who sailed in Europe, often to the Baltic countries. Dooitze Hinxt probably learned navigation skills aboard the ship of his father. In the years 1764–1780 Hinxt sailed on his own koff, the Aemelia Dorothea.

== In the service of the Frisian Admiralty ==
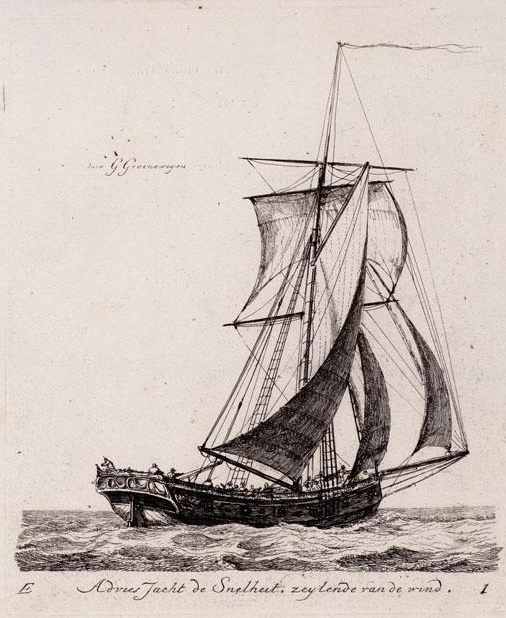
The cutter Snelheid

In 1782, Hinxt joined the Admiralty of Friesland. He became a lieutenant and was given command of the cutter Snelheid. This was a small ship, with copper sheathing, 12 guns and a crew of 60 men. The Snelheid was indeed a fast ship, and Hinxt often organized matches for speed with other ships. In the years 1783–1785, Hinxt sailed for the Dutch colony of Essequibo in Latin-America. In the years 1787–1789, he sailed to the Mediterranean Sea, where he visited the Aegean Islands, among other places. On 23 December 1789, Hinxt was promoted to Captain. In the years 1792–1794, he visited Essequibo and the Mediterranean a second time.

In September 1794, Hinxt joined a fleet near Flushing to await the French forces from the South. Hinxt was known to be a good navigator, but he wasn't a good military man. Yet in 1794, he collided with the ship of war Walcheren (capt. Marinus J. Haringman). The side of the Snelheid became badly damaged. Captain Haringman (and other officers with him) acted arrogantly towards Hinxt and his small cutter and refused to pay the repair costs. In the end, the issue was solved when Admiral Jan Hendrik van Kinsbergen got involved. Meanwhile, Hinxt was ready for a new ship. In a letter he complained because he was wet all the time, with wet clothes in a wet cabin, and the decks were never dry.

=== Marriages ===
Hinxt married Anna Gerrits from the city of Leeuwarden in 1763. After her death he married Elisabeth Annes de Haan in 1769. She also died young, due to complications of childbirth. Hinxt married again in 1790, with Catharina Joris de Haan (Elisabeth's sister?), who was also born in Leeuwarden. The couple moved to the city of Harlingen. Hinxt had three children, but in 1797 only his daughter Anna Maria survived.

== In the service of the Batavian Navy ==
When hostilities broke out between the Dutch Patriots party and the Orangist party in 1787, Hinxt had not openly supported a cause. Old letters reveal that he did have contacts with the Patriot party. So when the patriots seized power in 1795, it was clear to Hinxt that he would join the Batavian Navy.

In 1796 Hinxt was given command of the ship Beschermer. This was a ship of war with 56 guns, and a crew of 350 men. The ship became part of a fleet under Vice-Admiral Jan Willem de Winter, which was made ready for an invasion of Ireland. The fleet was meant to sail for Brest first, to combine with a French fleet. But a Royal Navy blockade prevented the Batavian fleet from leaving port. In the summer of 1797, the Batavian fleet was stationed near Texel. At this time, Hinxt, his wife, and his daughter Anna Maria (born in 1778) were all aboard the Beschermer.

== The Battle of Camperdown ==
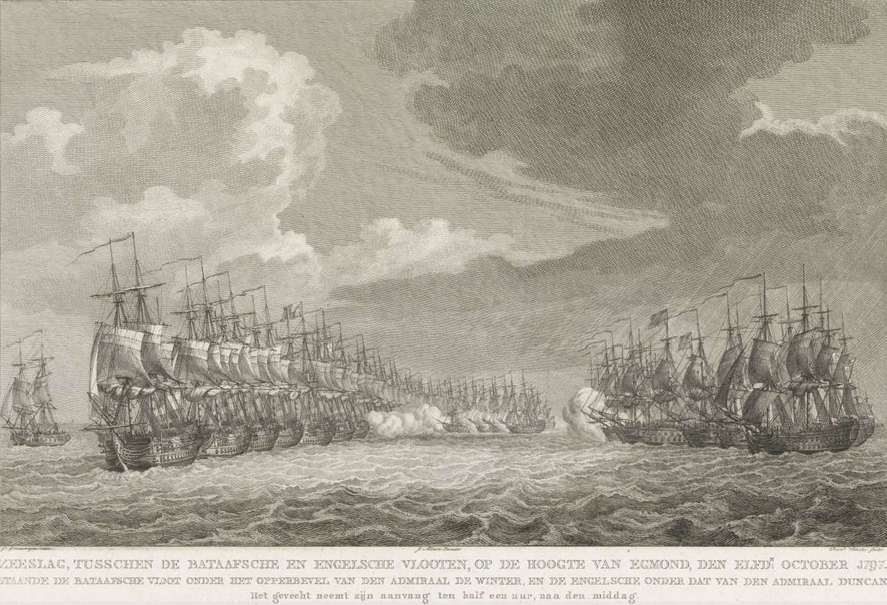
The Battle of Camperdown, where Hinxt died

On 8 October 1797 Admiral De Winter decided to go on a small cruise to give his crew some experience. A British fleet under Admiral Adam Duncan was quickly informed of this, and on 11 October 1797 the two fleets engaged each other near the village of Camperdown. The Beschermer sailed in the tip of the line and was attacked by HMS Belliqueux. Hinxt was wounded early in the battle. His left arm and a finger on his right hand were shot off, and he received another wound on his left thigh. Hinxt was quickly taken to his cabin for medical care.

He allegedly spoke to his Lieutenant Jacob Oelsen, asking: "Will we have to surrender?", Oelsen answered: "No captain! We won't surrender, we will give all we can." Hinxt replied: "Then continue, and do your duty!" Minutes later, the Beschermer was attacked by HMS Lancaster. The Beschermer's officers left the battle, considering their situation hopeless. The Battle of Camperdown was a crushing defeat of the Batavian Navy.

Dooitze Eelkes Hinxt died of his wounds on 20 October 1797. He was buried at Huisduinen.
