= John Wells (Royal Navy officer) =

Royal Navy Admiral (1763–1841)

Admiral Sir John Wells GCB
- Born: 1763
- Died: 19 November 1841 (aged 78)
- Military career
- Allegiance: Kingdom of Great Britain; United Kingdom
- Branch: Royal Navy
- Service years: c.1779–1841
- Rank: Admiral
- Units: HMS Raven; HMS Boreas; HMS Lancaster
- Conflicts: American Revolutionary War; Battle of Ushant; French Revolutionary War; Nore Mutiny; Battle of Camperdown
- Awards: Naval Gold Medal

Admiral Sir John Wells GCB (1763 – 19 November 1841) was a Royal Navy officer of the eighteenth and nineteenth centuries. He was the son of Sarah Wells, who was mistress to Rear-Admiral Augustus Keppel. After joining the Royal Navy Wells was promoted to lieutenant in 1779 and commander in 1782. He was then given his first command, the sloop HMS Raven. He served in her on the Leeward Islands Station until he was captured by two French frigates in 1783. He was then promoted to post captain and given command of the frigate HMS Boreas upon his release later in the year. He left Boreas in 1784 and did not receive another command until 1797 when he commissioned the ship of the line HMS Lancaster.

While fitting out Lancaster the ship was caught up in the Nore Mutiny and Wells was forced to escape her through a gun port, but was later able to re-join the ship and accept the surrender of the mutineers. Lancaster joined the North Sea Fleet after this and fought at the Battle of Camperdown, for which Wells received the Naval Gold Medal. After briefly serving on the Irish Station in 1798 Wells left Lancaster in early 1799 and did not receive a command again. By seniority he was promoted to flag rank in 1805 and was knighted in 1820. He died at his home near Cuckfield in 1841 at the age of seventy-eight.

== Early life ==
John Wells was born the son of Sarah Wells, the mistress of Rear-Admiral Augustus Keppel, in 1763. Wells' father may have been Keppel or his mother's previous partner, "a low fellow". Wells was sent to boarding school in Richmond as a child. At some period in his early life he followed Keppel into a career in the Royal Navy.

== Naval career ==
Wells fought at the Battle of Ushant on 27 July 1778 under Keppel, and was promoted to lieutenant on 22 July 1779, having presumably served for some time as a midshipman. With the American Revolutionary War drawing to a close, Wells was promoted to commander on 1 June 1782 and in September was given command of the sloop HMS Raven on the Leeward Islands Station. On 7 January 1783 Raven was taken by the French frigates Nymphe and Concorde while sailing off Montserrat, and Wells was captured. (Note: While John Marshall originally recorded Wells as commanding the sloop HMS Wasp for a period after Raven, a later correction notes that this was in fact the ship of Commander John Hills and not Wells.)

Wells' period of captivity was only short, and on 1 March 1783 he was promoted to captain. His first command was the frigate HMS Boreas on the Jamaica Station, which he was given in May. He paid her off in November but recommissioned her again later in the same month. He left Boreas in March 1784 when Captain Horatio Nelson assumed command. His next command came in February 1797 when he was given the newly commissioned ship of the line HMS Lancaster upon her conversion from an East Indiaman. (Note: John Marshall states that Wells commanded the ship of the line HMS Defence between 1794 and 1797 but he mistakes Wells for Captain Thomas Wells.) Lancaster was sent to join the North Sea Fleet of Admiral Adam Duncan and was caught in the Nore Mutiny while fitting out. Lancaster was at the time anchored in Long Reach, near Gravesend, but despite not being at the Nore chose to support the mutineers there by following suit on 27 May. To escape the mutiny Wells climbed through one of Lancaster's gunports with the aid of two watermen. The crew began to regret their decision to mutiny and on 6 June Wells went on board and accepted their surrender in return for a full pardon for their actions.

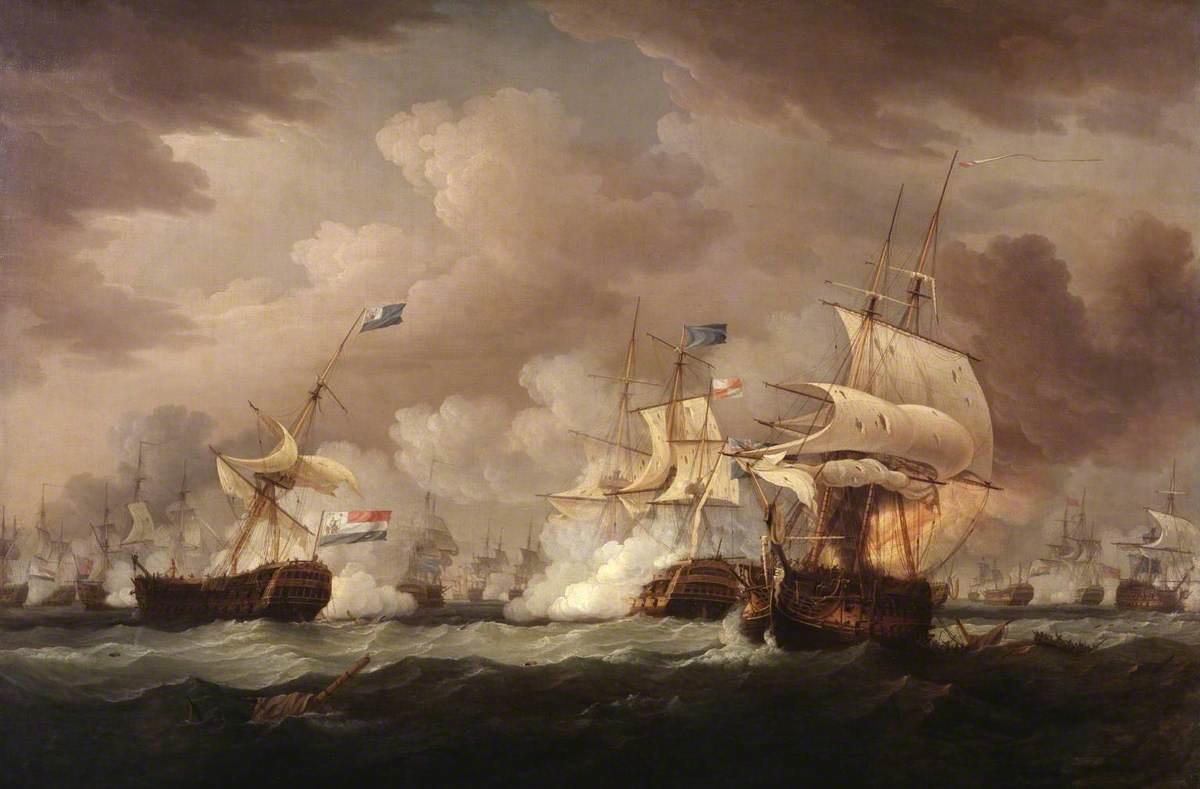
The Battle of Camperdown

Having returned to Duncan's fleet, Wells fought in Lancaster at the Battle of Camperdown on 11 October where the British fleet defeated their Dutch opponent. Lancaster fought in the starboard line of British ships and had three men killed and another eighteen wounded in the battle. She was one of three British ships to attack the leading ships of the Dutch fleet and Wells then had her engage the ship of the line Beschermer before moving down the line of battle to assist other British vessels in their fights. Despite being criticized for his conduct during the battle, Wells received the Naval Gold Medal and participated in the procession that saw the captured Dutch ship's colours hung in St Paul's Cathedral. Lancaster transferred to serve on the Irish Station in 1798 before going in for a refit in April 1799. Wells stayed in command of Lancaster until the refit was completed in May, at which point he handed over command and left the ship. He did not serve at sea again.

By seniority Wells was promoted to rear-admiral on 9 November 1805, vice-admiral on 31 July 1810, and admiral on 19 July 1821. (Note: Full dates of flag rank: Rear-admiral of the blue on 9 November 1805, rear-admiral of the white 28 April 1808, rear-admiral of the red 25 October 1809, vice-admiral of the blue 31 July 1810, vice-admiral of the white 12 August 1812, vice-admiral of the red 4 June 1814, admiral of the blue 19 July 1821, admiral of the white 22 July 1830, admiral of the red 10 January 1837.) He was knighted as a Knight Commander of the Order of the Bath on 20 May 1820 as part of the celebrations leading up to George IV's coronation. He was advanced to Knight Grand Cross of the Order of the Bath on 29 October 1834, after the death of Admiral Sir Benjamin Hallowell Carew left that position in the Order vacant.

Wells died at Belmore on 19 November 1841 at the age of seventy-eight. He was buried at St Margaret's Church, Rottingdean. Upon his death Wells was the fifth-most senior admiral in the Royal Navy. The explorer Captain George Vancouver named Wells Passage after him in 1792.

== Personal life ==
Wells married Jane Dealty of Rottingdean, Sussex, on 29 April 1815. Together they purchased the house of Belmore near Cuckfield, in October 1825. This was done with the wealth of his wife; Wells relied on his Royal Navy half pay in retirement and held no property before his marriage. She died at Worthing on 30 April 1844, and the couple having no children, their wealth and estates were left to Jane's sister Elizabeth.
