= Dutch ship Beschermer =

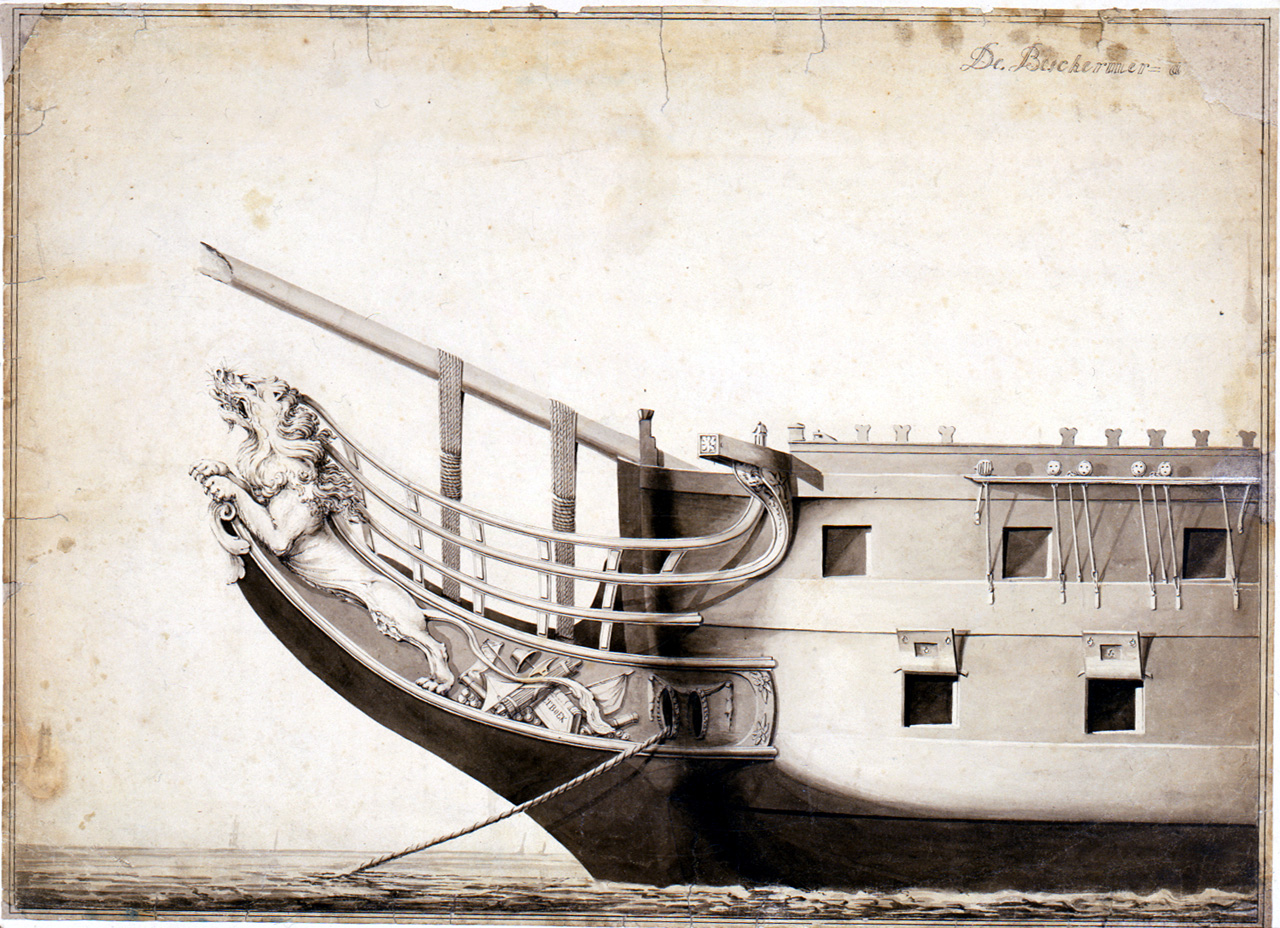
1784

Six Dutch ships of one or other of the five regional Admiralties within the United Provinces of the Netherlands have borne the name Beschermer or Schermer:

- The 50-gun ship of the line Beschermer (1665) built at Amsterdam for the Admiralty of Amsterdam in 1665 and captured by the French at Tobago on 12 December 1677
- The 96-gun ship of the line Beschermer (1690) built at Enkhuizen for the Admiralty of the Noorderkwartier in 1699, which was sold to be broken up in 1721
- The 90-gun ship of the line Beschermer (1691) built at Rotterdam for the Maas Admiralty in 1691, which sold to be broken up in 1715
- The 44-gun frigate Beschermer (1735) built at Amsterdam for the Maas Admiralty in 1735, which sold to be broken up in 1754
- The 52-gun ship of the line Beschermer (1741) built at Amsterdam for the Maas Admiralty in 1741, which sold for mercantile use in 1744
- The 50-gun ship of the line Beschermer (1784) built at Enkhuizen for the Admiralty of the Noorderkwartier in 1784, which in 1795 was taken over by the Batavian Republic and in 1799 was captured by and incorporated into the British Navy
