= Battle of Camperdown =

1797 battle of the War of the First Coalition

- Part of the War of the First Coalition
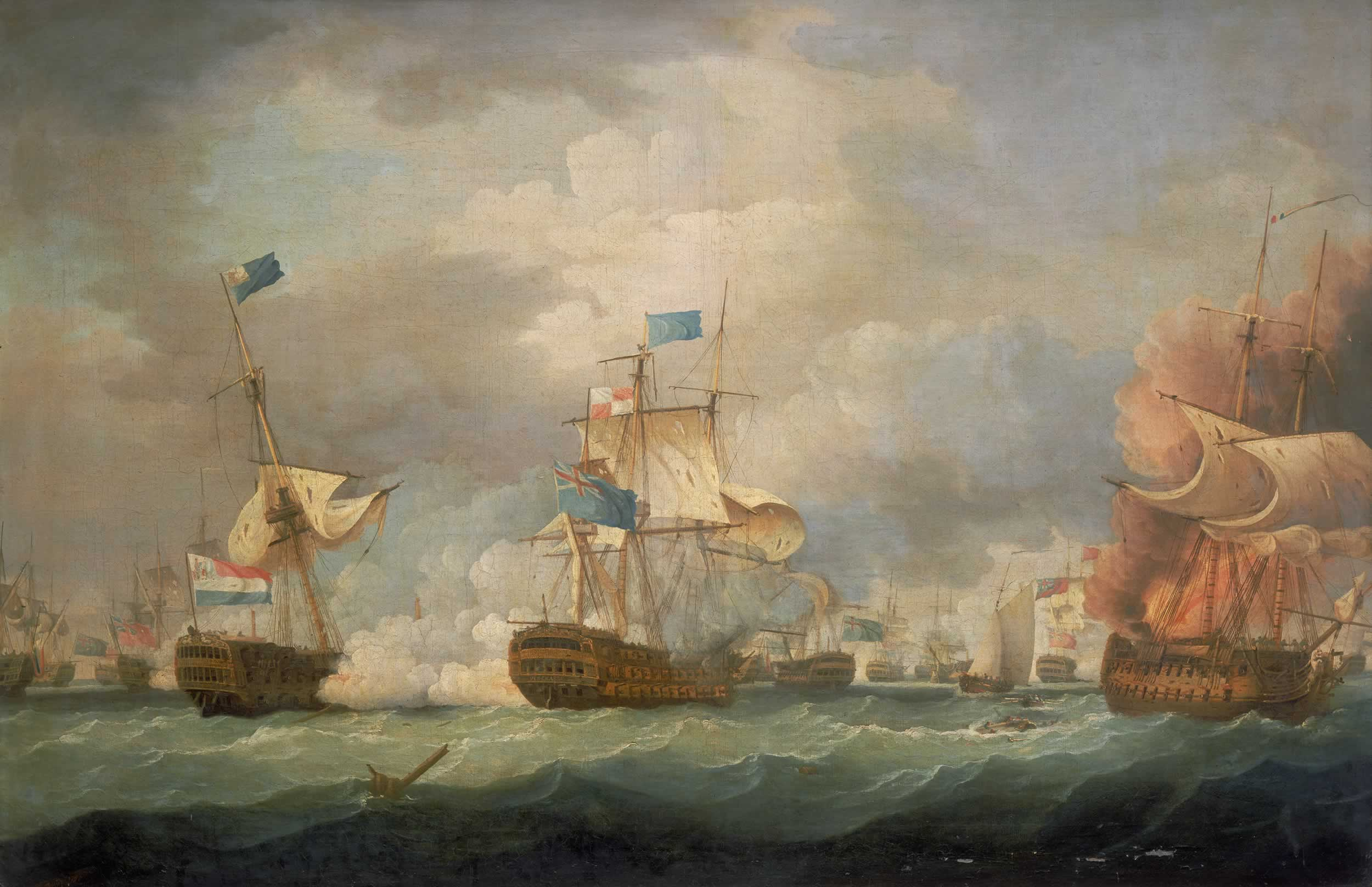
- 1798 painting of the battle
Date	11 October 1797
Location	Off Camperduin, North Sea 52°45′N 4°12′E
Result	British victory

Belligerents
Great Britain	Batavian Republic

Commanders and leaders
Adam Duncan	Jan Willem de Winter (surrendered)

Strength
16 ships of the line; 2 frigates; 1 ship-sloop; 4 cutters; 1 lugger (OOB)	15 ships of the line; 6 frigates; 4 brigs; 1 aviso (OOB)

Casualties and losses
203 killed; 622 wounded	540 killed; 620 wounded; 3,775 captured; 9 ships of the line captured; 2 frigates captured
- Location within North Sea

The Battle of Camperdown (Dutch: Zeeslag bij Kamperduin) was fought on 11 October 1797 (Note: Although most sources give the date of the battle as 11 October, Christopher Lloyd has claimed that, as the British naval day ran from noon until noon instead of midnight to midnight, the battle actually began on the morning of what was 12 October 1797 for those on land.) between the Royal Navy's North Sea Fleet under Admiral of the Blue Adam Duncan and a Batavian Navy fleet led by Vice-admiral Jan Willem de Winter. Duncan's fleet won a complete victory over de Winter's in what was the most significant engagement between British and Batavian forces during the French Revolutionary Wars, capturing eleven ships without losing any of their own.

In 1795 the Dutch Republic was overrun by France and reorganised into the Batavian Republic, a French sister republic. After several French Navy campaigns ended in disaster, the Batavian navy was ordered to move to Brest in 1797. This rendezvous never occurred, as the French and their allies failed to capitalise on the Spithead and Nore mutinies that paralysed the British Channel and North Sea fleets in the spring of 1797. By September, the Batavian navy was blockaded in the Texel by the North Sea Fleet under Duncan, though the British were forced to return to Yarmouth for supplies in October. De Winter used the opportunity to lead the Batavian fleet into the North Sea; when they returned to the Dutch coast on 11 October, a waiting Duncan intercepted them off Camperduin.

Attacking the Batavian line of battle in two groups, Duncan's ships broke through its rear and van before engaging with de Winter's frigates. The battle split into a leeward melee, where superior British forces overwhelmed the Batavian rear, and a windward melee, where a more even exchange centred on battling flagships. As the Batavians attempted to reach shallower waters and escape Duncan's attack, the British leeward ships joined the windward melee and forced de Winter's flagship Vrijheid and ten other ships to strike their colours.

The loss of Vrijheid prompted the remaining Batavian ships to disperse and retreat, and Duncan ordered his fleet to sail back to Yarmouth with their prizes. Struck by gales en route, two prizes were wrecked and another had to be recaptured before Duncan's fleet reached England. Casualties in both fleets were heavy, and the Batavian Navy was broken as an independent fighting force, losing eleven ships and more than 1,100 men.

== Background ==
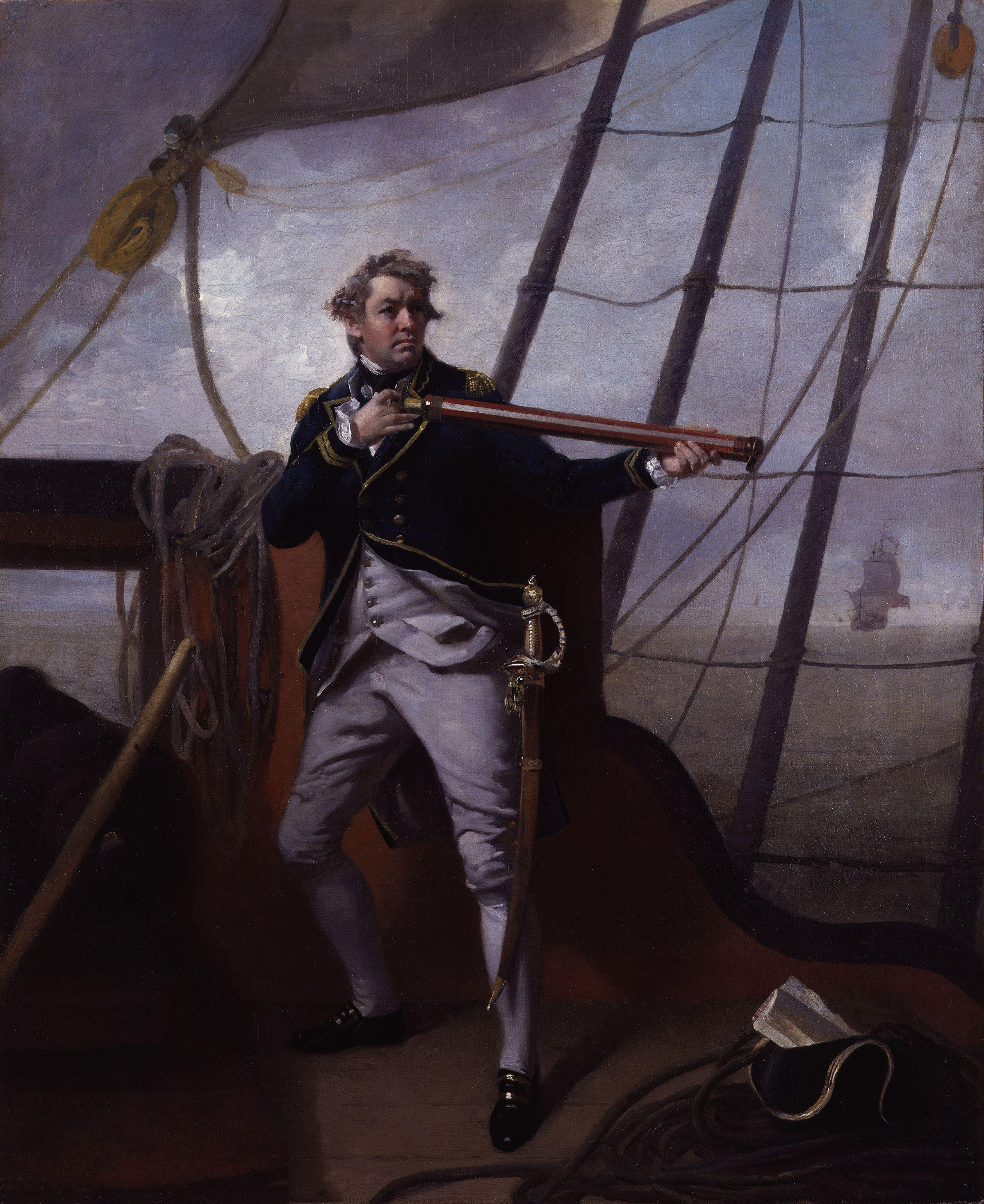
Adam Duncan, commander of the British fleet at the battle

In the winter of 1794–1795, forces of the French Republic overran the neighbouring Dutch Republic during the French Revolutionary Wars. The French then reorganised the country as a client state named the Batavian Republic, and it joined France against the allies in the War of the First Coalition. One of the most important Dutch assets of which the French gained control was the Dutch States Navy. The Dutch fleet provided a substantial reinforcement to the French forces in northern European waters, which were principally based at Brest on the Atlantic Ocean and whose main opponent was the Royal Navy's Channel Fleet. The location of the main anchorage of the Dutch fleet in the waters off the Texel prompted a reorganisation of the distribution of British warships in Northern European waters, with a new focus on the importance of the North Sea. With the Navy suffering severe shortages in men and equipment and with other theatres of war deemed more important, small, old and poorly maintained ships were activated from reserve and based in harbours in East Anglia, principally the port of Yarmouth, under the command of Admiral of the Blue Adam Duncan. The 65-year-old Duncan was a veteran of the wars of the War of the Austrian Succession (1740–1748), the Seven Years' War (1756–1763) and the American Revolutionary War (1775–1783) and had fought at numerous engagements with distinction and success. Standing at 6 ft 4 in (1.93 m) he was also noted for his physical strength and size: a contemporary described him as "almost gigantic".

The French Navy had suffered a series of one-sided defeats in the opening years of the war, suffering heavy losses at the Glorious First of June in 1794 and during the Croisière du Grand Hiver the following January. In late 1796, after prompting from representatives of the United Irishmen (a society dedicated to ending British rule of the Kingdom of Ireland), the French Atlantic Fleet launched a large scale attempt to invade Ireland, known as the Expédition d'Irlande. This too ended in disaster, with twelve ships lost and thousands of men drowned in fierce winter gales. Their ambitions frustrated, the representatives of the United Irishmen, led by Wolfe Tone, turned to the new Batavian state for support and were promised assistance in the coming year by a united French and Dutch fleet. A plan was formulated to merge the French and Dutch fleets and attack Ireland together in the summer of 1797. Tone joined the staff of Vice-admiral Jan Willem de Winter on his flagship Vrijheid in the Texel and 13,500 Dutch troops were equipped in preparation for the operation, the fleet waiting only for the best moment to take advantage of easterly winds and sweep past the British blockade and down the English Channel.

=== Spithead mutiny ===
For the Royal Navy, the early years of the war had been successful, but the commitment to a global conflict was creating a severe strain on available equipment, men and financial resources. The navy had expanded from 134 ships at the start of the conflict in 1793, to 633 by 1797, (Note: The first total is taken from the naval abstract of 1793, and the second from the abstract from 1797 (which is incorrectly dated as 1799 in William James).) and personnel had increased from 45,000 men to 120,000, an achievement possible only as a result of the impressment service, which abducted criminals, beggars and unwilling conscripts for compulsory service at sea. Wages had not been increased since 1653, and were usually months late, rations were terrible, shore leave forbidden, and discipline harsh. Tensions in the fleet had been gradually rising since the start of the war, and in February 1797, anonymous sailors from the Channel Fleet at Spithead sent letters to their former commander, Lord Howe, soliciting his support in improving their conditions. The list was deliberately ignored on the instructions of First Lord of the Admiralty Lord Spencer, and, on 16 April, the sailors responded with the Spithead Mutiny: a largely peaceful strike action led by a delegation of seamen from each ship tasked with negotiating with the authorities and enforcing discipline. For a month the fleet remained at stalemate, until Lord Howe was able to negotiate a series of improvements in conditions that induced the strikers to return to regular service. The mutiny had achieved almost all of its aims; increasing pay, removing unpopular officers, and improving conditions for the men serving in the Channel Fleet and, ultimately, the whole navy.

While the upheaval continued at Spithead, Duncan had retained order in the North Sea Fleet at Yarmouth by the sheer force of his personality. When men from his flagship, HMS Venerable, clambered up into the rigging and roared three cheers in a prearranged signal for the revolt to begin on 1 May, Duncan initially threatened to run the ringleader through with his sword. Calmed by his subordinates, he instead assembled his officers and the Royal Marines aboard his ship and advanced on the men in the rigging, demanding to know what they were doing. So fierce was his tone that the men fell silent and hesitantly returned to their quarters except for five ringleaders, whom he admonished personally on his quarterdeck before issuing a general pardon and dismissing them to their duty. The following week, he assembled all of the men and demanded to know whether they would follow his orders: in response, the crew nominated a spokesman, who apologised for their actions, saying, "we humbly implore your honour's pardon with hearts full of gratitude and tears in our eyes for the offense we have given to the worthiest of commanders who has proved a father to us". A week later, when a similar outbreak of mutiny affected the fourth rate ship, HMS Adamant, under Captain William Hotham, Duncan again acted decisively, coming aboard Adamant as the crew rebelled and demanding to know if there was any man who disputed his authority. When a sailor stepped forward, Duncan seized him by his shirt and dangled him over the side of the ship with one arm crying, "My lads – look at this fellow – he who dares to deprive me of command of the fleet". The mutiny evaporated almost instantly.

=== Nore mutiny ===
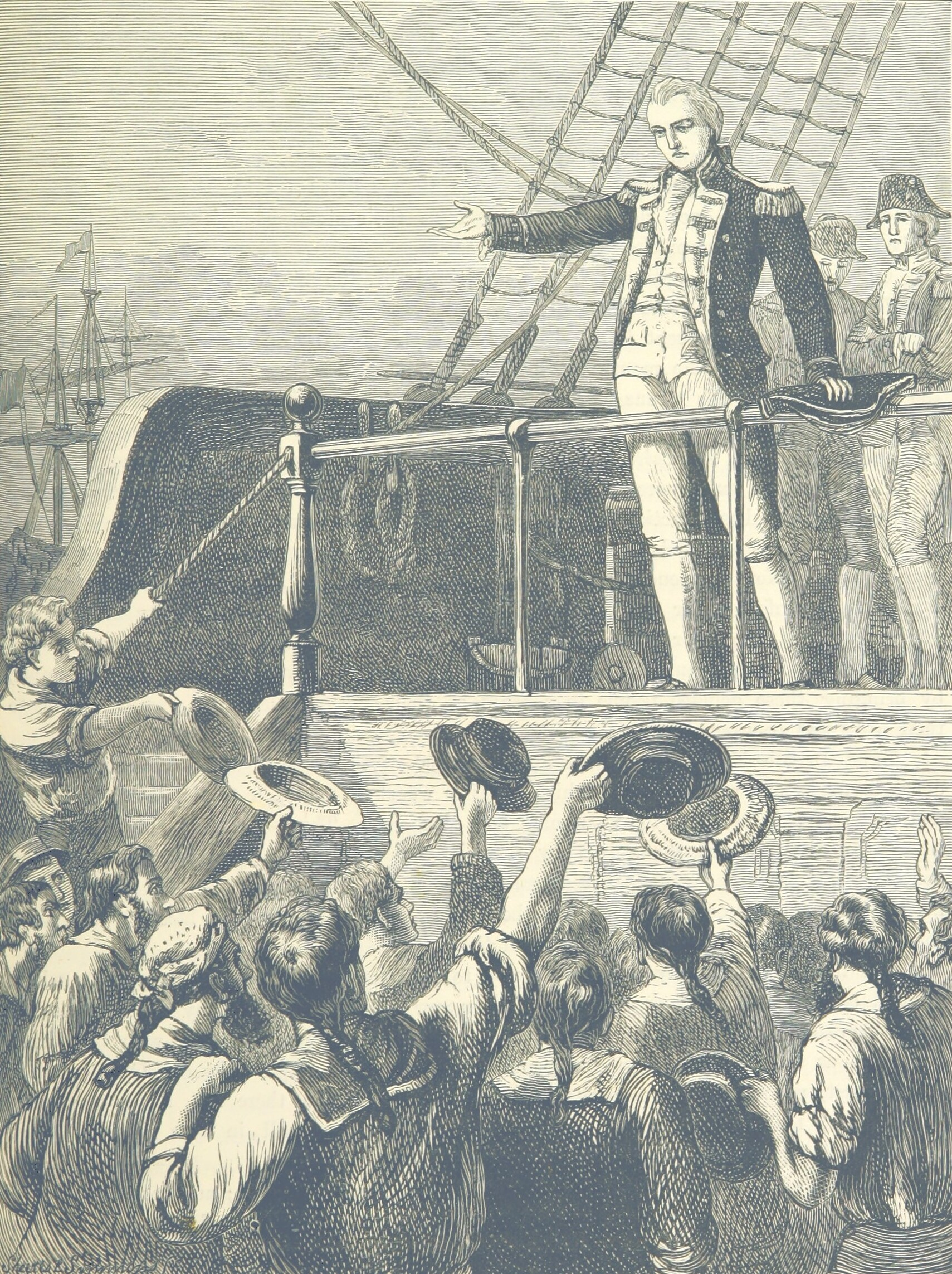
Duncan speaking to his crew to persuade them not to join the mutiny

Despite his initial success, Duncan was unable to retain control in the face of a more widespread revolt on 15 May among the ships based at the Nore, which became known as the Nore Mutiny. Led by a sailor named Richard Parker, the Nore mutineers quickly organised and became a significant threat to water traffic in the Thames Estuary. Duncan was informed that his fleet at Yarmouth might be ordered to attack the mutineers and, although reluctant, responded, "I do not shrink from the business if it cannot otherwise be got the better of". When rumours of the plan reached the fleet at Yarmouth, the crew of Venerable also expressed their distaste with the plan, but reaffirmed their promise of loyalty to their admiral whatever the circumstances. News then arrived that the Dutch fleet under De Winter was preparing to sail, and Duncan's fleet was ordered by Lord Spencer to blockade the Dutch coast. Duncan issued orders for the fleet to weigh anchor, but the men disobeyed and ship after ship overthrew their officers and joined the mutineers at the Nore. Eventually Duncan was left with only his own Venerable and Hotham's Adamant to contain the entire Dutch fleet. Duncan later wrote that, "To be deserted by my own fleet in the face of the enemy is a disgrace which I believe never before happened to a British admiral, nor could I have supposed it possible."

Aware that the escape of the Dutch fleet into the North Sea at such a vulnerable time could be disastrous for Britain, Duncan maintained his position off the Texel for three days, during which the wind was ideal for a Dutch foray, and he disguised his two vessels as different ships on each day and ordered the frigate HMS Circe to make a flurry of nonsensical signals to a fictitious British fleet beyond the horizon. He was subsequently joined by two additional ships, HMS Russell and Sans Pareil, and on the fourth day, with conditions still perfect for the Dutch, he anchored his squadron in the Marsdiep Channel and gave orders for them to fight until their ships sank, thereby blocking the channel. In a speech to his men, he announced that "The soundings are such that my flag will continue to fly above the water after the ship and her company have disappeared". The expected attack never came: the Dutch army that was to have joined the fleet was not prepared, and Duncan's misleading signals had successfully convinced De Winter that a large British fleet waited just beyond the horizon. The winds subsequently changed direction, and, on 10 June, six more ships joined Duncan's squadron from the Channel Fleet, and, on 13 June, a Russian squadron arrived. While Duncan had been at sea, the Nore Mutiny had acrimoniously fallen apart under blockade by government forces. Cut off from food supplies and with public support decidedly against the mutiny, Parker issued threats that the ships under his control would be handed over to the French government. Fighting subsequently broke out between the radical leaders and the moderate majority of seamen, and the ships gradually deserted Parker and returned to their anchorages, so that by 12 June only two ships still flew the red flag of the mutineers. Eventually, the last rebellious ship, Parker's own HMS Sandwich, surrendered on 14 June.

== De Winter's cruise ==
By the middle of August 1797, after six weeks of constant easterly winds that kept his ships trapped in their harbour, De Winter decided that an attempt to join the French at Brest as the first stage of an invasion of Ireland was impractical and he abandoned the plan. In part this decision was due to the strength of Duncan's reconstituted fleet, which had increased to 17 ships of the line with the addition of the vessels returned from the Nore. Duncan's men were also better trained and more experienced than their Dutch counterparts, having spent considerably longer at sea and having been taught to fire three rounds a minute to the Dutch two. In addition to his concerns about the proficiency of his men, De Winter was also worried about their loyalty: the dominion of France over the Batavian Republic and the country's enforced participation in distant theatres of warfare were unpopular among the Dutch people. Although De Winter was an avowed republican, who had fought in the French Army against the Netherlands between 1793 and 1795, support for the House of Orange remained strong among the Dutch population and with the fleet's sailors. Wolfe Tone wrote in frustration that "The destiny of Europe might have been changed for ever... the great occasion is lost, and we must do as well as we can."

When news of this decision reached the Admiralty, they recalled Duncan's blockade fleet to Yarmouth for a refit on 1 October; the admiral insisted on sending some of his ships back to the Dutch coast two days later under Captain Henry Trollope in HMS Russell, accompanied by HMS Adamant and the small ships HMS Beaulieu, Circe and Martin with the hired armed cutter Black Joke. Their arrival off Texel on 6 October coincided with De Winter's much delayed expedition. Although some sources, particularly in France, have claimed that De Winter was determined to bring Duncan to battle, in reality he was more concerned that his men were disaffected and inexperienced by their long stay in port, and had reluctantly acceded to orders from the Batavian government to conduct a brief sweep in the Southern North Sea in search of weak British forces that could be overwhelmed by his fleet or drawn into the dangerous shallow waters of the Dutch coastline. He may also have been hoping to resurrect the plan to augment the French at Brest if he was able to pass westwards down the English Channel undetected. His fleet consisted of 16 ships of the line and a number of smaller support craft, and his orders from The Hague included instructions to remember "how frequently Dutch Admirals have maintained the honour of the Dutch flag, even when the enemy's forces were sometimes superior to theirs." Preparing the ships for sea took some time, and the Dutch did not manage to leave the Texel until 10:00 on 8 October, De Winter turning southwest in the hope of linking with another Dutch ship of the line at the mouth of the River Maas. Within hours, Trollope had discovered and followed De Winter.

The Dutch fleet was watched constantly by the ships Duncan had sent to observe them, and when Dutch preparations to sail were observed, a message was sent back to Duncan informing him of the Dutch movements. The despatch vessel flew the signal for an enemy as it entered Yarmouth roads early in the morning on 9 October, so that by the time it had docked the British fleet was already preparing to sail, (Note: The identity of the despatch vessel sent to Duncan by Trollope is disputed. William James, writing in 1827, attributed this action to the hired armed lugger Black Joke, and this was repeated by William Laird Clowes in his 1900 history. However, Edward Pelham Brenton, writing in 1836, named the hired armed cutter Active as the messenger. This view was followed in 2008 by Noel Mostert. In 1963, Christopher Lloyd ascribed the signal to the lugger Speculator, which was followed within hours by the cutters Active and Vestal who brought detailed accounts of De Winter's movements. All of the accounts agree on the manner in which the unknown vessel arrived at Yarmouth. Black Joke was not among the vessels listed as qualifying for either the prize money for the captured Dutch ships, nor for the Naval General Service Medal, though both Active and Speculator were.) Duncan sending the final message to the Admiralty: "The wind is now in the NE and [I] shall make good course over to them, and if it please God, hope to get at them. The squadron under my command are unmoored and I shall put to sea immediately." Before midday, Duncan had sailed with the 11 ships that were ready and steered for the mouth of the Texel, intending to intercept De Winter on his return. By evening his fleet was at full strength, three stragglers having rejoined, and on the afternoon of 10 October his ships were anchored off the Dutch port, scouts reporting 22 merchant ships in the harbour but no sign of De Winter's warships. Since leaving the Texel, De Winter had been unable to escape from Trollope's ships: on the evening of 10 October, several Dutch vessels were detached to drive his squadron away while the Dutch fleet lay off the Maas, but could not close with the faster British vessels. Having failed to make the rendezvous off the Maas, De Winter then turned to the northwest, cruising off Lowestoft in Suffolk and again unsuccessfully attempting to drive away Trollope's squadron. There, reports from Dutch fishing vessels of Duncan's appearance off the Texel reached De Winter and he immediately recalled his ships and ordered the fleet to turn back towards the Dutch coast, aiming for the village of Scheveningen. Meanwhile, further messages from Trollope reporting the Dutch movements had reached Duncan and he turned his fleet west, following the Dutch coastline. At 07:00 on the morning of 11 October Trollope's squadron sighted sails to the northeast and, after confirming that they were Duncan's fleet, signalled that the Dutch fleet was approximately 3 nautical miles (5.6 km) further to the southwest, becoming visible to the fleet by 08:30. The first clear sighting was reported by Captain Peter Halkett of Circe, who had climbed the mainmast to get a better view. At this point, the Dutch were sailing towards land, approximately 9 nautical miles (17 km) off the coast of North Holland, close to the village of Camperduin. The weather was poor, with heavy seas and strong wind from the southeast broken by frequent rain squalls, but this did not prevent hundreds of Dutch civilians gathering on the dunes to watch the impending combat.

=== Duncan's attack ===
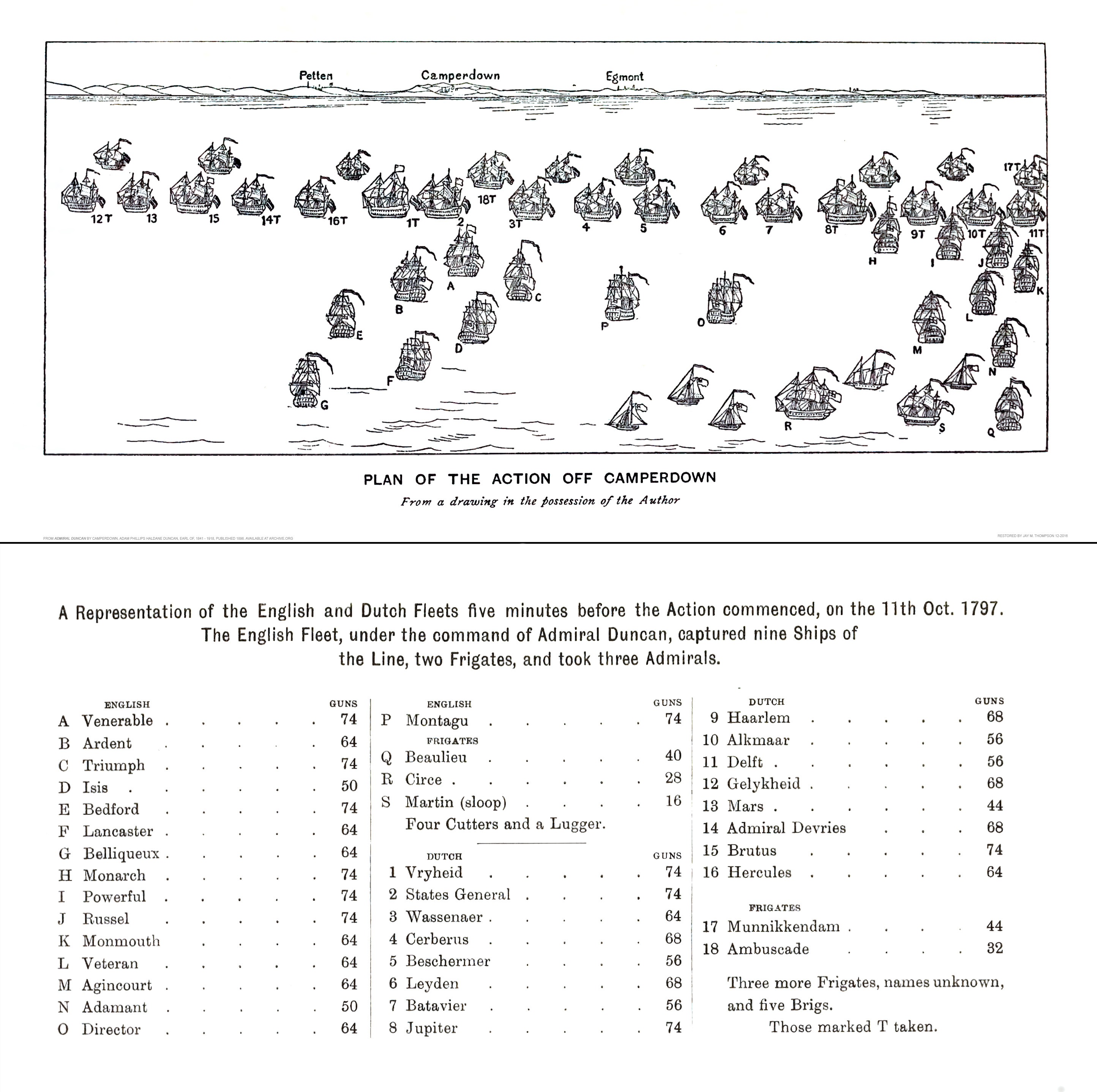
Contemporary drawing of Duncan's attack with a legend showing the location of each ship, a few moments before firing began.

At 09:00, Duncan made the signal to prepare for battle while De Winter organised his ships into a line of battle to meet the British attack in a solid defensive formation, sailing on the port tack in a northeasterly heading. As they manoeuvred into their assigned stations, the Dutch fleet drew closer to the shore. Duncan intended to follow Lord Howe's manoeuvres at the Glorious First of June three years earlier and bring each ship through the Dutch line between two opponents, but the Dutch formation and proximity to the shore rendered this plan impractical. To compensate, Duncan signalled for his ships to form line and sail southeast on the port tack so that they had the wind directly behind them. Shortly afterwards, concerned that the Dutch might make the shoreline before he could bring them to battle despite his wry insistence that "I am determined to fight the ships on land if I cannot by sea", Duncan ordered his fleet to turn southwards and advance on the enemy and "bear up and sail large". He fired signal guns to alert his captains and then ordered them to "engage the enemy as arriving up" and for his van to attack the Dutch rear. At 11:00, Duncan sought to remedy increasing gaps between his vessels by ordering the faster ships to slow down and wait for their compatriots. He then made an effort to re-establish the line on the starboard tack before realising that the Dutch fleet was still in order awaiting the British attack and continually drawing closer to the dangerous coastline. Abandoning his previous signals, Duncan ordered the entire fleet to turn towards the Dutch and attack directly, each ship to "steer for and engage her opponent". Many of these signals were poorly executed and incorrect, visibility was low and Trollope's squadron was still using obsolete signal codes, so a number of vessels failed to comprehend Duncan's intentions, turning the advancing line into a ragged pattern of scattered vessels clustered into two loose groups. The flurry of orders was so quick and contradictory that at least one captain gave up entirely: the Scottish captain, John Inglis, of HMS Belliqueux threw his signal book to the deck in frustration and shouted "Up wi' the hel'lem and gang into the middle o't."

The combined effect of Duncan's orders was to split his fleet into two uneven divisions, each sailing in a loose formation towards the unified Dutch line. The northern, or windward, division comprised six third rate ships of the line, two fourth rate ships and the frigate Circe, tasked with repeating signals from the flagship Venerable, which led the division with HMS Triumph and Ardent close behind. This force was aiming for the Dutch flagship, Vrijheid, which lay fifth in the Dutch line. The southern, or leeward, division comprised eight third rate ships of the line and the repeater frigate HMS Beaulieu, and was led by Vice-admiral Richard Onslow on HMS Monarch. Onslow's force was aiming for the rear of the Dutch line, to strike the fourth ship from the end. Behind the two divisions lay a line of small craft tasked with repeating Duncan's signals so that the entire fleet could see his intentions. At 11:53, Duncan raised the signal for each ship to pass through the Dutch line and attack from the far side, but the poor weather prevented the more distant ships from recognising the signal.

De Winter had originally intended to close his line up into a solid defensive platform and retreat to shallower waters while Duncan formed his own line of battle, but the sudden, disorganised British attack had thrown his plans into confusion. As a result, gaps had opened up between his van, centre and rear, leaving the last four ships greatly outnumbered and unsupported. De Winter gave urgent orders for the van and centre to drop back and assist the rear, but there was little time, and his situation looked desperate: although the Dutch and British lines each mustered 16 ships, the British vessels were almost all larger and more strongly built than their Dutch counterparts, and their crews were experienced seamen in the heavy weather conditions, while the Dutch crews, confined to port for the previous year, had little understanding of the skills required in combat at sea. The Dutch line of battle was accompanied by a second line to the east, formed from ten frigates, brigs and smaller craft. These vessels, unlike the smaller ships with the British fleet, were well armed and situated so that their guns covered the gaps between the ships that formed the Dutch line of battle, ready to rake any British vessels that attempted to break through.

== Battle ==
=== Collapse of the Dutch rear guard ===
At 12:05, Duncan raised the signal ordering his ships to engage the enemy closely. At the same time, the Dutch ship Jupiter, under Schout-bij-nacht Hermanus Reijntjes, fourth from the southern end of the line, opened fire on the rapidly approaching Monarch. The Dutch ships had waited until the British were well within effective range in order to maximise the effect of their shot, and soon Onslow's flagship was under fire from the entire rearguard of the Dutch line, the ship suffering damage while attempting to break through the Dutch line between Jupiter and Haarlem at 12:30. On Monarch, Captain Edward O'Bryen remarked to Onslow that he could not see where his ship could pass between the closely formed Dutch ships, to which Onslow responded that "the Monarch will make a passage." Striking the small gap between the ships, Onslow fired raking broadsides into both vessels and then turned to lay his ship alongside Reyntjes' flagship. As he did, the Dutch frigate Monnikkendam and the brig Daphné pulled out of the second line and attempted to fill the gap Monarch had created, firing into the British ship of the line as they did so. (Note: There is disagreement as to the identity of Monnikkendam's companion in this attack, with James naming the brig as Atalante while Clowes claims in a footnote that James was mistaken and that the ship was in fact Daphné.) In response, Onslow opened fire on the smaller vessels, destroying the frigate's wheel and damaging the rigging, so that the ship fell back, followed later by the severely damaged brig.

Monarch was almost immediately followed by HMS Powerful under Captain William O'Bryen Drury, which passed through the same gap, raked Haarlem again and poured a destructive fire into the wallowing Monnikkendam. At the same time, HMS Montagu attacked Alkmaar, the next in line, from the west, while HMS Russell, under Captain Trollope, attacked the last Dutch ship, the 56-gun Delft. These attacks were accompanied by fire from HMS Monmouth, which passed between Alkmaar and Delft, and raked both ships, and from HMS Director (under William Bligh of Bounty fame), which passed up the Dutch line until it reached the battered Haarlem, engaging the ship at close range. The straggling HMS Veteran joined the northern part of the engagement, cutting across Jupiter and then turning in pursuit of the Dutch centre, while Adamant reached the fight late, joining the attack on the already battered Haarlem. Only HMS Agincourt remained apart from the battle entirely, passing up the Dutch line at extreme range; one anecdotal account reports that on board Agincourt a stray shot passed high over the deck and an officer was seen to flinch, drawing a scornful call from the crew that "There is no danger yet, sir." Agincourt's captain John Williamson was subsequently court-martialled and dismissed.

In the confusion, the tail of the Dutch line disintegrated into a chaotic melee, with eight British ships of the line fighting four Dutch and the frigate Monnikkendam. So close was the action that the British ships found themselves at risk of firing into one another in the high seas, heavy rain and poor visibility. The Dutch centre, consisting of the ships of the line Brutus, Leijden and the fifth rate razee Mars, pulled away from the engagement behind them under Schout-bij-nacht Johan Arnold Bloys van Treslong, coming under only distant fire from the ships of Onslow's division. Isolated, the Dutch rearguard were rapidly overwhelmed, with Jupiter, Haarlem, Alkmaar and Delft all surrendering to Onslow's attack before 13:45, while the battered Monnikkendam was seized by the frigate Beaulieu.

=== Battle of the vanguards ===
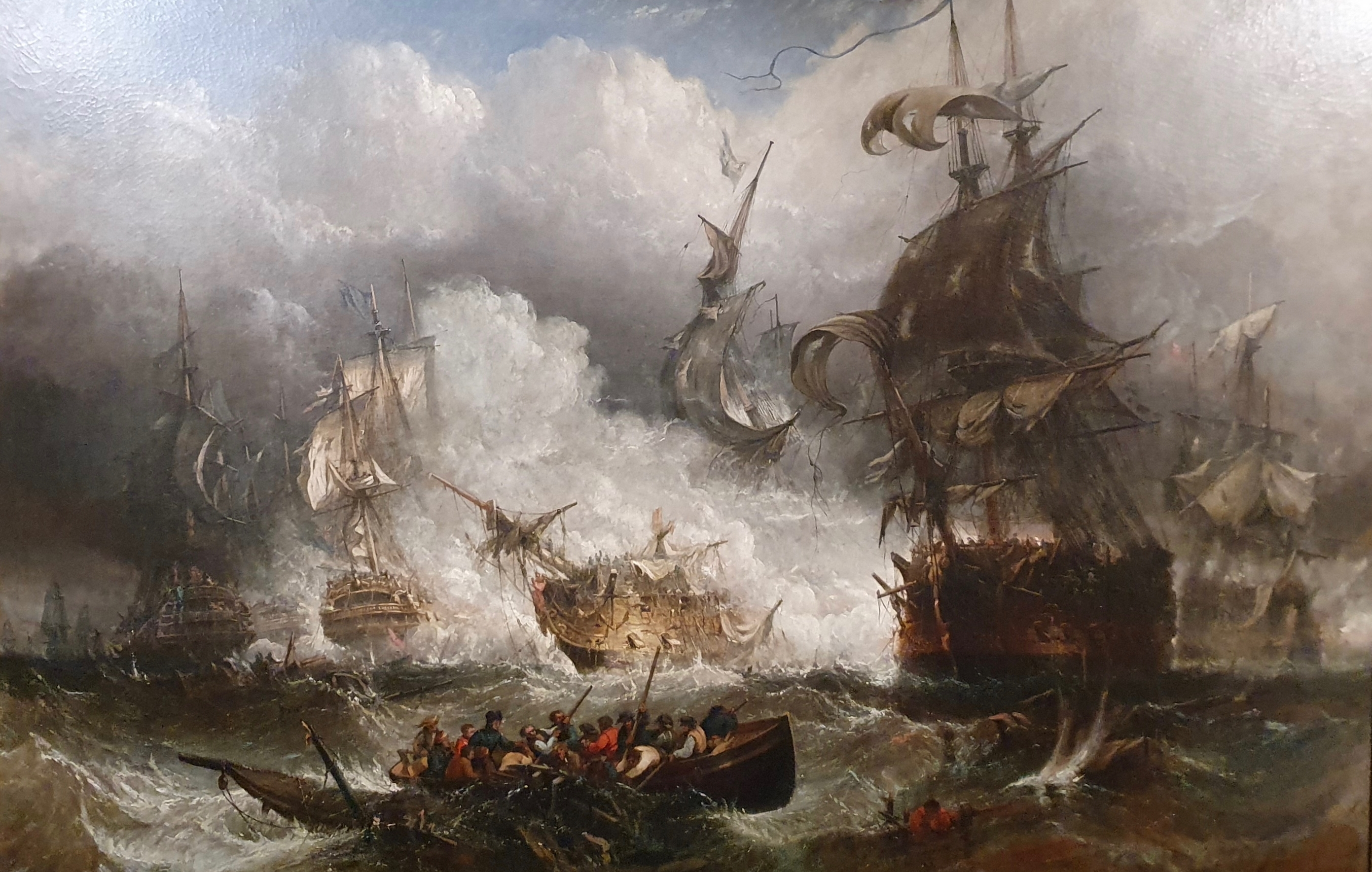
The Battle of Camperdown, William Adolphus Knell

While the Dutch rearguard was overwhelmed by British numbers, a more equal combat was being contested to the north. There the combat was centred around the two flagships, Duncan's Venerable engaging De Winter's Vrijheid 18 minutes after Monarch broke the line to the south. Duncan had originally intended to break the line between Vrijheid and the next ship Staaten Generaal under Schout-bij-nacht Samuel Story, but Story ensured that there was no gap between his vessel and the flagship to break through, and their combined fire was so dangerous to the advancing Venerable that Duncan instead cut through behind Staaten Generaal, raking Story's ship twice and causing it to drift off in confusion as Duncan engaged Vrijheid from the east.

While Venerable had diverted south, Vrijheid had been attacked from the west by Ardent under Captain Richard Rundle Burges. The smaller British ship had soon suffered more than a hundred casualties, including Burges killed, under the combined fire of De Winter's flagship and the next ship ahead, Admiraal Tjerk Hiddes De Vries. Only the arrival of Venerable alongside Vrijheid allowed Ardent a brief respite. During the fight, Burges' men "fought like maniacs", including the wife of one of the gunners who insisted on joining her husband at his gun, until her legs were torn off by cannon fire. Within a short period however both Venerable and Ardent were surrounded, as at least one of the frigates from the second line joined the attack on the two isolated British vessels. At the height of the combat, the colours and signal flags on Venerable were brought down by cannon fire. To ensure that there was no suggestion that the flagship had surrendered, a sailor named Jack Crawford scrambled to the top of the mainmast and replaced them as the battle raged beneath him. To support Duncan, Captain William Essington of HMS Triumph and Captain Sir Thomas Byard of HMS Bedford drove forward into the battle, Triumph coming close alongside the Dutch Wassenaar and opening a heavy fire while Bedford attacked Admiraal Tjerk Hiddes De Vries and Hercules. At the tip of the line, Beschermer was attacked by Belliqueux to starboard, Captain Inglis passing through the gap between Beschermer and Hercules. Ahead of this combat, the lead ships HMS Isis and Gelijkheid fought alongside one another, Isis having failed to break through the Dutch line and instead drawn up to port.

The Dutch central division joined the battle at the head of the line shortly after the engagement of Triumph and Bedford, causing considerable damage to all of the British vessels, particularly Venerable. The British flagship was soon isolated in the midst of the Dutch van, engaging Vrijheid, Staaten General, Admiral Tjerk Hiddes De Vries and Wassenaar simultaneously. Despite the heavy odds Duncan continued to fight hard, the British succeeded in knocking out two opponents by wounding Captain Dooitze Eelkes Hinxt of Beschermer, which drifted eastwards in confusion, while shots from either Bedford or Triumph set a powder barrel on Hercules on fire. The blaze on the latter ship, which soon spread to the sails and rigging, prompted a lull in the battle as the crew of Hercules desperately attempted to extinguish the blaze and other Dutch ships scrambled to escape the burning vessel as it drifted through the melee. Shortly afterwards, the battered Wassenaar surrendered to Triumph, with Captain Holland dead on his quarterdeck. Triumph then moved on towards the battle between Vrijheid and Venerable, at which time the crew of Wassenaar raised their colours again after being fired on by a Dutch brig.

=== Onslow's reinforcement ===
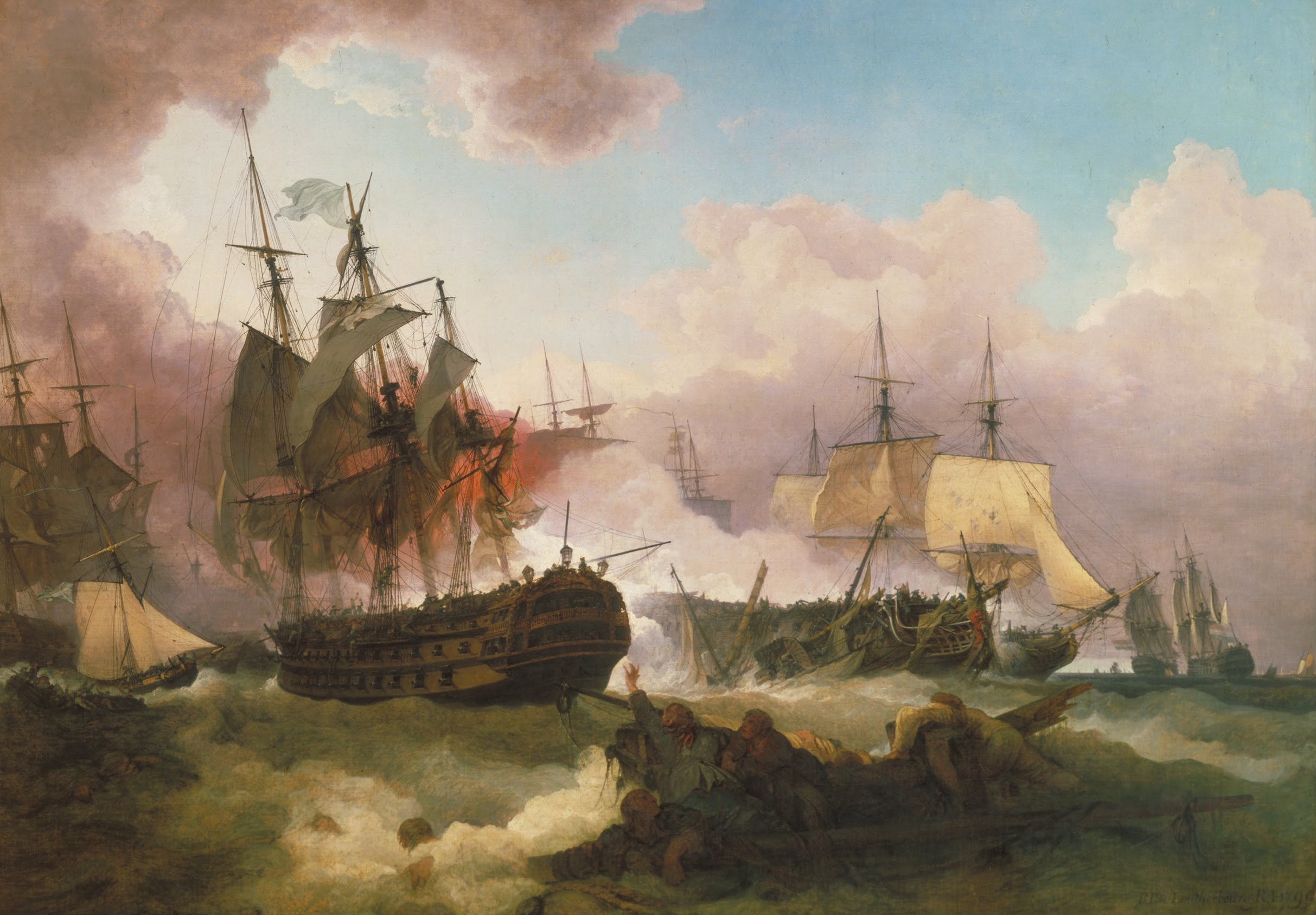
The Battle of Camperdown (James Philip de Loutherbourg, 1799)

Following Onslow's victory over the Dutch rearguard, the admiral ordered the least damaged of his ships to sail in support of the outnumbered British ships in the melee at the Dutch van. Powerful and Director were the quickest to respond, joining the attack on Vrijheid at 14:00. Russell, driving northwards to join the attack, encountered the now extinguished Hercules, whose crew had thrown all of their ammunition overboard during the fire to prevent the ship exploding. The ship was thus defenceless, Commander Ruijsoort surrendering immediately. The remainder of the British fleet now arrived in the battle, Captain John Wells of HMS Lancaster firing on the Beschermer near the head of the Dutch line. Aware that their vessel would be unable to resist the attack, Beschermer's surviving officers turned away towards the shore, rapidly followed by the unengaged portions of the Dutch line. With the arrival of British reinforcements and the retreat of sections of the Dutch fleet, the battle was almost complete; the battered Wassenaar surrendered for the second time, to Russell, while Admiraal Tjerk Hiddes De Vries and Gelijkheid, both of which were too badly damaged to escape, also struck their colours. Eventually only the Dutch flagship remained in combat.

For an hour De Winter continued his resistance, with Director holding station off the stern of Vrijheid and repeatedly raking it. By 15:00, all three masts had been brought down, obstructing the fire of the starboard battery, while De Winter was the only officer who remained uninjured, standing on his wrecked quarterdeck and still refusing to lower his colours. In an attempt to settle the combat, Captain William Bligh of Director closed to within 20 yards (18 m) of the Dutch flagship and demanded to know if De Winter surrendered. The Dutch admiral replied "What do you think about it?", and then attempted to personally raise signals demanding reinforcements from the rest of his fleet, only to find that the halyards had been shot away. De Winter then summoned the ship's carpenter and ordered him to repair his barge, so that the admiral could transfer his command to another ship and continue the battle. When British sailors from Director boarded the drifting flagship, De Winter was discovered assisting the carpenter with repairs to the barge. On being informed that he was a prisoner of war, he replied "This is my destiny not foreseen" and, after checking on a mortally wounded officer who lay on the quarterdeck, he followed the boarding party back to their boat for the trip to Venerable.

== Aftermath ==
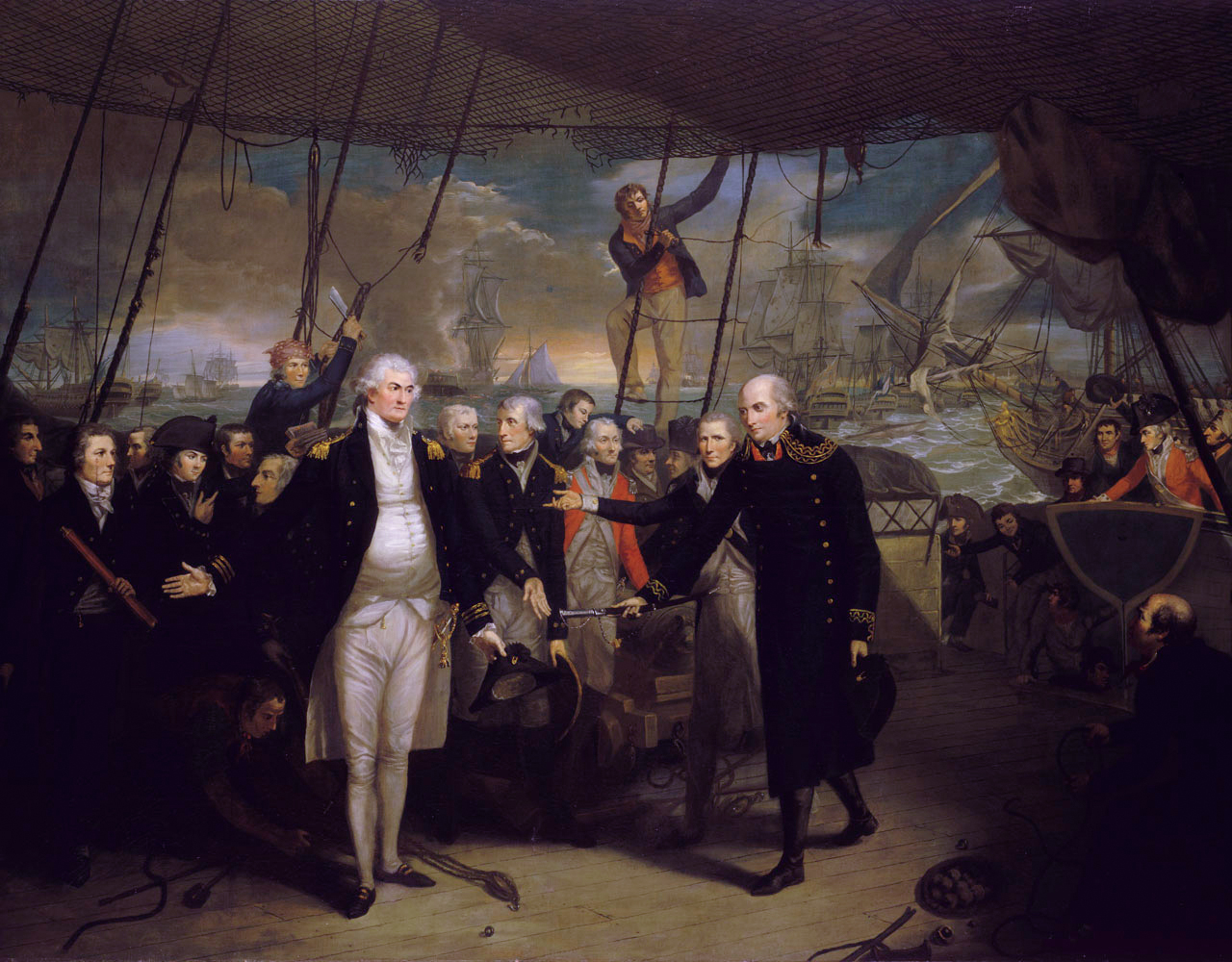
1797 painting of Duncan receiving de Winter's surrender by Daniel Orme

De Winter was immediately taken to see Duncan, the Dutch officer holding out his sword as a token of surrender. Duncan refused the weapon, instead shaking De Winter's hand and insisting "I would much rather take a brave man's hand than his sword". In addition to the losses in the rear, five ships of the Dutch van had been captured as well as the frigate Ambuscade that had attacked from the second line. The remainder of the Dutch ships had fled, making rapid progress towards the coastal shallows. Duncan did not follow them: the Dutch coast between Kamperduin and Egmond was only 5 nautical miles (9.3 km) away, his ship lay in just 9 fathoms (18 yards (16 m)) of water and the weather was too fierce and his ships too battered to risk combat in shoal waters. Instead he ordered his ships to ensure control of their prizes and to return to Britain. Many ships were now undermanned due to the terrible casualties they had suffered: surgeon Robert Young of Ardent, the worst hit of the British ships, worked for more than twelve hours without a break and later wrote:

Melancholy cries for assistance were addressed to me from every side by wounded and dying, and piteous moans and bewailing from pain and despair. In the midst of these agonising scenes I was able to preserve myself firm and collected... Many of the worst wounded were stoical beyond belief; they were determined not to flinch and, when news of the shattering victory was brought down to them, they raised a cheer and declared they regretted not the loss of their limbs.

— Quoted in Peter Padfield, Nelson's War (1976)

Casualties in the battle were very heavy on both sides, and historians such as William James have noted that the losses among the British ships were proportionally much higher than when British fleets met French or Spanish opposition. This was attributed to the Dutch tactics, mirrored by the British, of firing at the enemy hulls rather than attempting to disable their masts and rigging as in other continental navies. The worst hit of the British ships were those in the first wave, such as Ardent with 148 casualties, Monarch with 136 and Belliqueux with 103, while both Adamant and Agincourt escaped without a single man killed or wounded. Among the dead were Captain Burges of Ardent and two lieutenants, while the wounded included Captain Essington of Triumph and twelve lieutenants. In total, British losses were recorded after the battle as 203 killed and 622 wounded, although later assessments based on charitable requirements of those wounded or killed gave the higher figures of 228 killed and 812 wounded, including 16 of the latter who subsequently died. Many of the British ships were badly damaged, taking on large quantities of water through damaged hulls. One of the worst hit was Venerable, which had to be completely dismantled and reconstructed after returning to Britain before the ship was ready for active service again.

Dutch casualty returns, particularly on the captured ships, were vague, and only partially complete. Among the losses were Captain Hinxt of Beschermer and Captain Holland of Wassenaar, both of whom were killed early in the battle. Also lost were Captain Van Rossum of Vrijheid, who was struck in the thigh by a cannonball and died shortly afterwards from the effects of the wound, and Reijntjes, who died while a prisoner in England as a result of the wounds he suffered aboard Jupiter. His remains were subsequently returned to the Netherlands with full military honours. There were also large numbers of wounded among the Dutch fleet, including van Treslong and Story; one of the few Dutch officers to escape injury or death was De Winter himself, who later commented "It is a matter of marvel that two such gigantic objects as Admiral Duncan and myself should have escaped the general carnage of this day." In total, Dutch losses were later reported as 540 men killed and 620 wounded, with Vrijheid the worst hit with the loss of almost half of its total complement.

=== Return journeys ===
1826 painting of Duncan receiving de Winter's surrender by Samuel Drummond

On Venerable, Duncan assembled all of those men fit to attend for a church service to "return thanks to Almighty God for all His mercies showered on them and him." For the next 24 hours the 66-year-old Duncan remained on duty without a break, organising the scattered fleet on its journey home. The British admiral did find time however to play a game of whist in his cabin with De Winter after dinner: when the Batavian admiral lost a rubber, he commented that it was hard to be beaten twice in one day by the same man. On 13 October, Duncan completed his official despatch and sent it ahead of his wallowing ships with Captain William George Fairfax on the cutter Rose: he praised all of his men, reserving special mention for Trollope and the late Burges, whom he called a "good and gallant Officer...a sincere Friend". De Winter was permitted to send despatches to the Batavian government, in which he blamed Story and his centre for not maintaining the combat longer. He also attributed overwhelming British numbers to his defeat and suggested that he may have captured some of the British fleet if he had been better supported. When this letter was later published it provoked a storm of criticism in Britain, one officer describing it as "a garbled account which, for ought I know, might have been collected by people on shore who knew nothing of the action".

During the afternoon of 12 October, a gale sprang up which inflicted further damage to the battered ships and caused water to gush through the many shot holes in the ships' hulls. Aboard the Batavian ships, the situation was especially dangerous. Casualties had been significantly higher, particularly on Vrijheid, than on board the British vessels and the small numbers of British sailors placed aboard as prize crews were unable to cope alone, and in the high winds many masts collapsed to the deck and huge quantities of water leaked into the hulls.

Delft, captured in the early stages of the battle, was under the command of Batavian Lieutenant Heilberg and British Lieutenant Charles Bullen, with a small prize crew of 69 men. Ninety-three Batavian prisoners had been removed, and among the remaining Batavian sailors were 76 wounded men. As the gale intensified, it rapidly became clear that despite a tow line attached from Veteran the ship would never reach Britain, and a large board was raised on deck with the chalked message "The ship is sinking". Reacting at once, boats from nearby ships organised an evacuation and began loading the Batavian prisoners for transfer to more seaworthy vessels. Bullen offered a place in the first rescue boat, from Veteran, to Heilberg, but he refused, gesturing to the immobile wounded who had been brought onto the maindeck as the lower decks had flooded and replying "But how can I leave these men?". In response, Bullen cried out "God bless you, my brave fellow! Here is my hand; I give you my word I will stay here with you!". The prize crew left on the second rescue boat sent from Russell, and Bullen and Heilberg waited for a third trip to bring them off with the remaining 30 wounded men and three junior Batavian officers who had also elected to stay. Before further help could arrive, however, Delft suddenly foundered, Bullen and Heilberg throwing themselves clear as the ship sank. Both were seen in the water but only Bullen reached safety, swimming to Monmouth alone.

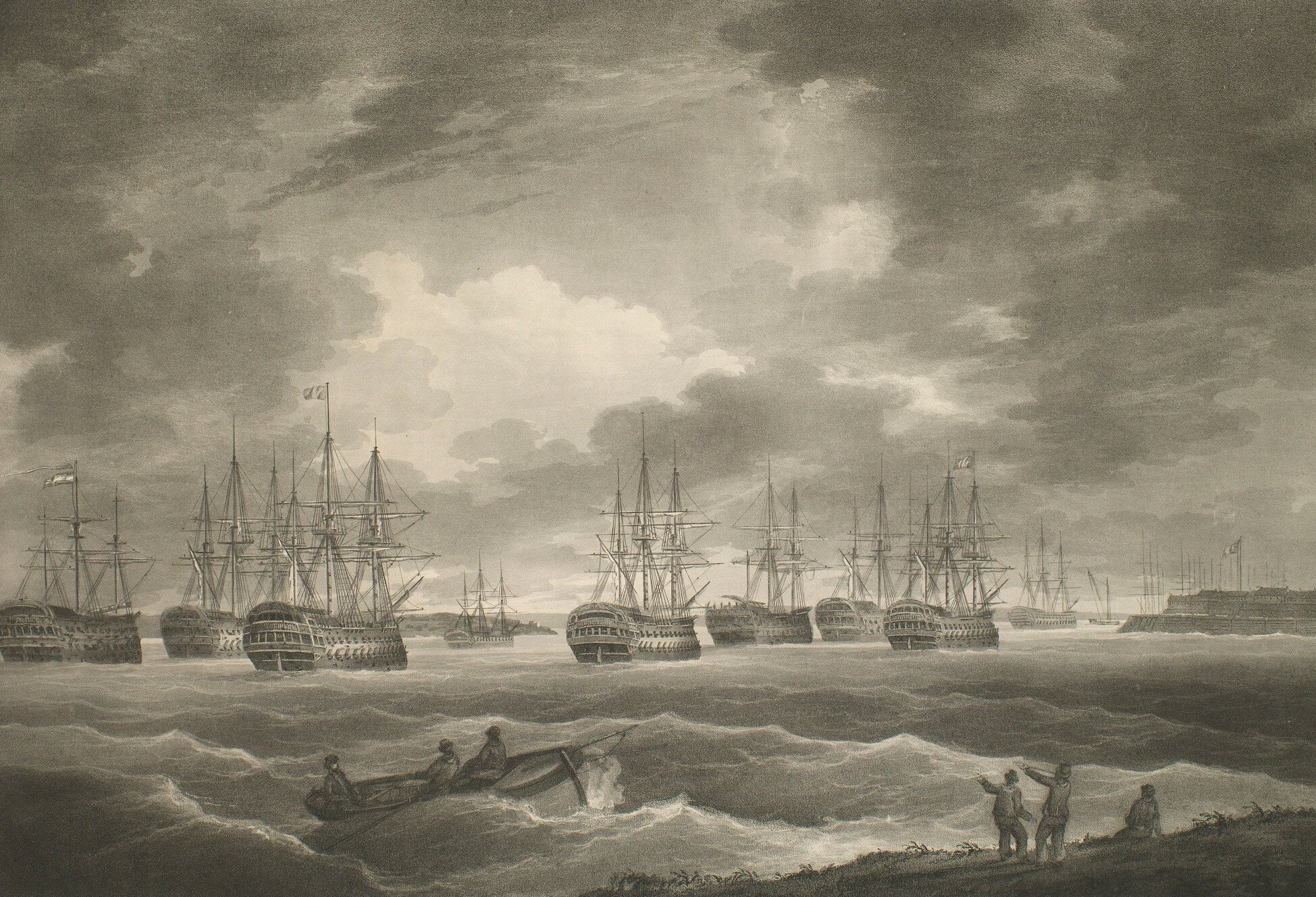
The seven surviving Batavian prizes on the River Medway

Two other prizes were lost to the British fleet: Monnikkendam had been supplied with a prize crew of 35 men from Beaulieu, but had become separated during the gales and lost its remaining masts and spars. The crew fitted jury masts, but they too collapsed and the hull flooded to a depth of 14 feet (4.3 m). On 12 October, aware that the ship would soon founder, the prize master instructed the Batavian boatswain to run the ship onto the Dutch coast at West Cappel. Local boats came out to the stranded vessel and all aboard were saved, the 35 British prisoners taken to a prison hulk at Vlissingen. The ship itself was wrecked beyond repair and abandoned. The other captured frigate, Ambuscade, was also driven ashore in a sinking state and the prize crew made prisoner, but in that case the ship was salvaged and later returned to Batavian service.

In contrast to the British difficulties, the survivors of the Batavian fleet had few problems returning to the Texel, with the exception of Brutus. Van Treslong had sailed for the coast off Hinder with two brigs, and there on 13 October the 40-gun British frigate HMS Endymion under Captain Sir Thomas Williams found him. At 16:30, Endymion closed with the larger, but damaged, Batavian ship and opened fire, Brutus responding with a broadside of its own. Williams successfully raked his opponent twice, but the complicated tides of the Dutch coast dragged his ship out of range at 17:30 before he could press his attack any further. Firing rockets in the hope of attracting attention from any of Duncan's ships, Williams was rewarded at 22:30 by the arrival of Beaulieu. On 14 October the frigates hunted for their opponents, and found the Batavian ships off the Goeree channel at 05:00. The frigates closed, and van Treslong withdrew, passing deeper into Dutch waters and reaching safety at Maese by 07:00. The British frigates, their quarry having escaped, returned to Duncan's struggling fleet.

== Results ==
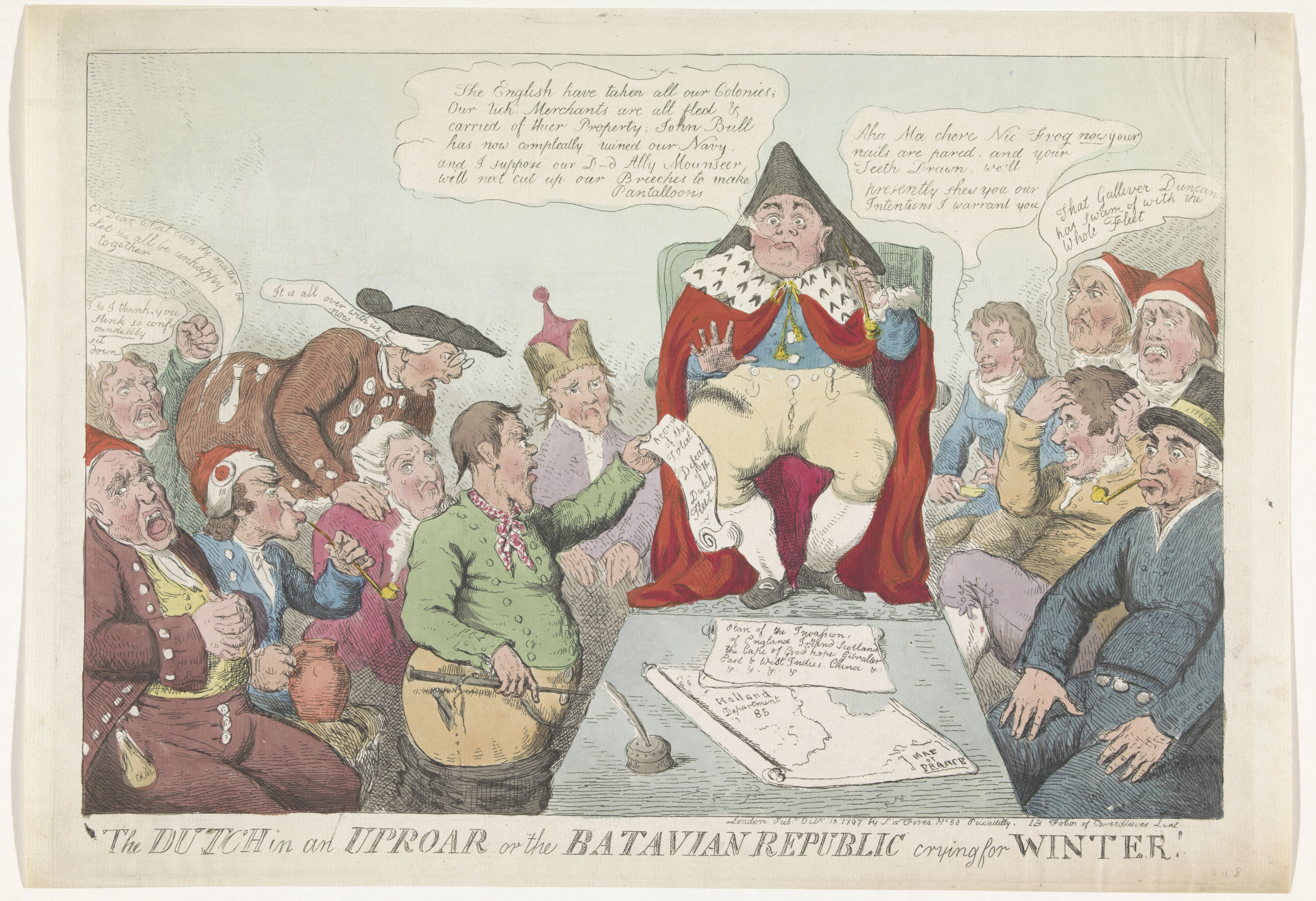
Political cartoon by Isaac Cruikshank mocking the Dutch reaction to the defeat

On 17 October 1797, Duncan's limping convoy began to arrive at Yarmouth to be greeted with great celebrations. Several ships were delayed, with three wallowing off Kentish Knock, three more in Hosley Bay and several still at sea due to an adverse northwesterly wind. News of the victory had already spread across Britain, and on 20 October Duncan was created Viscount Duncan of Camperdown and Baron Duncan of Lundie. Onslow was made a baronet and Captains Henry Trollope and William George Fairfax were knighted. (Note: Several sources, including Brenton and James, record that Trollope and Fairfax were made "Knights Banneret" by King George III. However, these awards were never recorded in The London Gazette and no formal Knights Banneret had been created since Sir John Smith at the Battle of Edgehill in 1642. It is much more likely that these knighthoods, which first appear in formal records in December 1797 without their nature being specified, were as Knights Bachelor.) King George III insisted on meeting Duncan personally, and on 30 October set out for Sheerness in the royal yacht HMY Royal Charlotte before strong winds and waves forced him back to port on 1 November. Unable to reach Duncan's flagship, the King instead rewarded the fleet as a whole by pardoning 180 men condemned for their role in the Nore Mutiny and held aboard the prison hulk HMS Eagle in the River Medway. Similar pardons were awarded by Rear-admiral Peter Rainier to mutineers in the East Indies Squadron. Gold medals were created and presented to the captains and both Houses of Parliament voted their thanks for their victory. All first lieutenants were promoted to commander and Duncan and Onslow were presented with valuable presentation swords valued at 200 and 100 guineas each respectively.

Duncan was also given a pension of £2,000 a year by the government, made a freeman of numerous towns and cities and was subject to presentations from numerous patriotic societies, particularly in Scotland, where he was awarded valuable plate by both his birth city of Dundee and the county of Forfarshire. A public subscription was taken up for the widows and wounded and raised £52,609 10s and 10d (the equivalent of £6.5 million as of 2024), When Duncan travelled to a reception at The Guildhall on 10 November, a mob surrounded his carriage in the street, unhitched the horses and dragged it themselves up Ludgate Hill as a mark of respect. On 23 December, the King led a thanksgiving procession and ceremony in St Paul's Cathedral in London at which Duncan carried De Winter's flag from Vrijheid and Onslow carried Reijntjes' flag from Jupiter, followed by Fairfax, Essington, Mitchell, Bligh, Walker, Trollope, Drury, O'Bryen, Gregory and Hotham as well as numerous seamen from the fleet. Five decades later the battle was among the actions recognised by a clasp attached to the Naval General Service Medal, awarded upon application to all British participants still living in 1847.

Not all of the reactions were positive: several of Duncan's captains were criticised for their failure to rapidly and decisively engage the enemy, including Captain Wells of Lancaster. The worst criticism fell on Captain John Williamson of Agincourt. Agincourt had been barely engaged in the battle and had suffered not one single casualty. As a result, Williamson was accused of failing to do his duty by Captain Hopper of Agincourt's Royal Marines and court-martialled on 4 December 1797, at Sheerness aboard Circe, on the charges of "disobedience to signals and not going into action" and "cowardice and disaffection". Williamson had a history of indecisiveness: in 1779, while a junior officer on Captain James Cook's voyage to the Pacific Ocean, Williamson had prevaricated about bringing boats to evacuate Cook from Kealakekua Bay while under attack by Hawaiians. As a result, Cook was trapped on the beach and stabbed to death. At the conclusion of the trial on 1 January 1798, Williamson was found guilty of the first charge and not guilty of the latter, resulting in demotion to the bottom of the post captains list and prohibition from further naval service. Williamson was reported to have died in 1799, shortly after his dismissal from the service, but Edward Pelham Brenton later claimed that he had instead gone into hiding under an assumed name and continued to draw his pension for many years. In the Batavian Republic, there were also recriminations against those officers who were deemed to have failed in their duty: De Winter's despatch from London after the battle placed much of the blame with six ships that had failed to follow his orders and had withdrawn early from the battle. Several officers were brought up on charges, including van Treslong, who was convicted at court-martial and dismissed the service although later reinstated, and Commander Souter of Batavier who was convicted and imprisoned. Story was also criticised, particularly by De Winter, and was only permitted to keep his command once he had satisfied the Batavian government that he had had no option but to retreat.

All of the captured Batavian ships were bought into the Royal Navy, Gelijkheid, Vrijheid, Wassenaar, Haarlem and Alkmaar under their own names (although in most cases they were anglicised) and Admiraal Tjerk Hiddes De Vries as the simpler Devries. Two were completely renamed, due to the prior existence of ships with their names in the Royal Navy; Jupiter became HMS Camperdown and Hercules became HMS Delft. None of these ships was ever in sufficient condition for service in open waters: the damage suffered at Camperdown proved too severe for them to be fully repaired. In addition, the Batavian warships had lighter hulls and flatter bottoms than ships of other nations as they were designed to operate off the shallow waters of the Dutch coast, and as a result they were of little use to the ocean-going Royal Navy. All the prizes were immediately relegated to harbour duty, and none were used for front-line service. Although the prize court took several years to determine the prize money that would be awarded for the battle, the initial estimates of £60,000 (the equivalent of £7.4 million as of 2024) proved pessimistic: Duncan and his men were eventually awarded £150,000 (the equivalent of £18.5 million as of 2024), although they were forced to defend a claim from the Russian navy on behalf of the squadron that had reinforced Duncan in May. Since this force had played no part in the battle and had been considered a liability rather than a benefit by the British commanders, the claim was rejected, but legal fees and other claims reduced the eventual payment. Following the award of the first £10,000 instalment, Duncan was given the unique honour of permission to buy shares on the London Stock Exchange at 7/8 market price.

== Legacy ==
They say they are going to make a Lord of our Admiral. They can't make too much of him. He is a heart of oak; he is a seaman every inch of him, and as to a bit of a broadside, it only makes the old cock young again.

— Anonymous sailor, October 1797

Although Camperdown was considered the greatest ever victory for a British fleet over an equal enemy force to that date, historian Noel Mostert has noted that it "was a battle that, with posterity, somehow lost rank and significance against the greater and more romantically glorious events that followed". Nevertheless, the effects of the action on the wider war were hugely important. The losses suffered by the Batavian Navy in ships, men and morale gave Britain naval superiority in the North Sea, a position enhanced by the disruption the battle caused to French negotiations for an alliance with what historian Edward Pelham Brenton describes as the "Northern Powers" of Scandinavia. The destruction of the Batavian fleet at Camperdown was also a serious blow to French ambitions to invade Ireland, and denied their Atlantic fleet of essential reinforcements; it may even have played a part in Napoleon's decision to abandon efforts to directly invade Britain in early 1798.

In 1799, a large Anglo-Russian expeditionary force landed in the Netherlands supported by a large fleet under Lord Duncan. Assailed from both sea and land, a Batavian squadron under Story capitulated without a fight: in what became known as the Vlieter incident, the political divisions between the officers and seamen in Story's fleet resulted in a mutiny during which the sailors threw their ammunition overboard. In Britain, the public relief at the restoration of the Royal Navy's authority in the aftermath of the spring mutinies was enormous and helped steady the wavering British government in their pursuit of the war by restoring confidence in Britain's naval supremacy in home waters. Christopher Lloyd notes that the events of 1797 led to "a new and blatant patriotism... [which] was centred on the achievements of 'our gallant tars'." A popular rhyme of the time reflected public feeling:

St Vincent drubbed the Dons, Earl Howe he drubbed Monsieur,
And gallant Duncan now has soundly drubbed Mynheer;
The Spanish, French and Dutch, tho' all united by,
Fear not Britannia cries, My Tars can beat all three.

Monsieurs, Mynheers and Dons, your country's empty boast,
Our tars can beat all three, each on his native coast.

— Quoted in Christopher Lloyd, St Vincent and Camperdown, 1963

Although Duncan's initial tactics at the battle were reminiscent of those of Howe at the Glorious First of June, and his eventual attack has been compared to Nelson's tactics at the Battle of Trafalgar in 1805, Duncan credited the tactical work Essay on Naval Tactics by John Clerk of Eldin for inspiring his decisions on the day. Duncan was subsequently indirectly criticised some years after the battle by his colleague Earl St Vincent, who had won the Battle of Cape St. Vincent over a Spanish fleet nine months before Camperdown. In a letter complaining of Clerk's assertion that he had been responsible for all of the major naval victories of the war, St Vincent wrote that Duncan "was a brave officer, little versed in the subtleties of naval tactics, and who would have been quickly embarrassed by them. When he saw the enemy, he rushed upon him without thinking of such and such and order of battle. To conquer he calculated upon the brave example he set his captains, and the event justified his expectation." This assessment was refuted by Captain Hotham, who publicly responded that "the advanced season of the year and the close proximity of the enemy's coast all made what, upon another occasion, might have appeared haste imperatively necessary, for it was the prompt decision of the Admiral that occasioned the result".

Several modern historians, such as Peter Padfield, have agreed with Hotham's assertion, with the added suggestion that Duncan's tactics during the battle might have had an influence on the newly promoted Rear-admiral Sir Horatio Nelson, who was in England recovering from the loss of his right arm at the Battle of Santa Cruz de Tenerife at the time of Camperdown. Duncan himself felt that he could have done more, noting that "We were obliged ... to be rather rash in our attack. Had we been ten leagues at sea none would have escaped." but some of the highest praise came from his erstwhile opponent, De Winter, who wrote that "Your not waiting to form line ruined me: if I had got nearer the shore and you had attacked, I should probably have drawn both fleets on it, and it would have been a victory for me, being on my own coast." Duncan's health deteriorated after the battle, forcing his retirement from the Navy in 1799 and contributing to his death at Cornhill-on-Tweed in 1804.

De Winter's actions during the battle have been commended: Edward Pelham Brenton wrote in 1836 that "The Dutch admiral displayed, in his own person, the most undaunted valour ... but was compelled at length to yield to superior skill, it would be untrue to say superior bravery." while William James noted in 1827 that after the battle ""Batavian prowess" still claimed the respect of an enemy and the applause of the world". De Winter was released from captivity in 1798 after news reached Britain that his wife had suffered a stroke, and he subsequently became the Batavian ambassador to France, before resuming command of the Batavian navy at the start of the Napoleonic Wars in 1803. He was a trusted subordinate of Louis Bonaparte, King of Holland between 1806 and 1810, and was honoured by Napoleon in 1811 before his sudden death in Paris the following year.

The battle became a popular theme for contemporary artists and many paintings depicting it are held in national collections in the United Kingdom, including paintings by Thomas Whitcombe and Philip de Loutherbourg in the Tate Gallery, Whitcombe, Samuel Drummond and Daniel Orme at the National Maritime Museum, and George Chambers, Sr. and John Singleton Copley at the National Gallery of Scotland. In literature, the battle has played a central role in the 1968 novel Sea Road to Camperdown by Showell Styles, and the 1975 novel The Fireship by C. Northcote Parkinson. The battle also inspired composers, such as Daniel Steibelt, whose composition Britannia: An Allegorical Overture was created in honour of the victory and Jan Ladislav Dussek, who created a composition entitled The Naval Battle and Total Defeat of the Dutch by Admiral Duncan in 1797.

The Royal Navy has commemorated the battle through the four ships that bore the name HMS Camperdown and seven named HMS Duncan, which have maintained close links with Duncan's hometown of Dundee. In Dundee, the Battle of Camperdown is commemorated at Camperdown House, originally the Dundee seat of the Viscounts Camperdown, which was completed in 1828 and later became a public park and tourist attraction. The bicentennial of the battle was celebrated in Dundee in 1997 with the "Glorious Victory" exhibition at the city's McManus Galleries in conjunction with Camperdown House and the National Museum of Scotland. The exhibition became a popular tourist attraction and was viewed by more than 50,000 visitors. On 11 October a memorial service was held to remember the dead and a new statue of Admiral Duncan unveiled in the town.

This 1798 Naval engagement was memorialised by Camperdown Street E1 by Aldgate London, no longer houses its to the rear of a British Telecom Plc office.

== Bibliography ==
- "On naval history, with strictures on Captain Brenton's work". The United Service Journal and Naval and Military Magazine. Vol. Part II. 1837. pp. 145–161.
- Brenton, Edward Pelham (1823). The Naval History of Great Britain, Vol. I. London: Henry Colburn. "Boston."
- Chandler, David (1999) [1993]. Dictionary of the Napoleonic Wars. Wordsworth Military Library. ISBN 978-1-84022-203-6.
- Clowes, William Laird (1997) [1900]. The Royal Navy, A History from the Earliest Times to 1900, Volume IV. Chatham Publishing. ISBN 978-1-86176-013-5.
- Easton, Callum, The 1797 Naval Mutinies and Popular Protest in Britain: Negotiation through Collective Action (Palgrave Macmillan, 2025) ISBN 978-3-031-98839-4, https://doi.org/10.1007/978-3-031-98840-0
- Gardiner, Robert, ed. (2001) [1996]. Fleet Battle and Blockade. Caxton Editions. ISBN 978-1-84067-363-0.
- Grocott, Terence (2002) [1997]. Shipwrecks of the Revolutionary & Napoleonic Era. Caxton Editions. ISBN 978-1-84067-164-3.
- James, William (1827). The Naval History of Great Britain, Volume 2, 1797–1799. Archived from the original on 27 May 2013.
- Laughton, John Knox (1899). "Trollope, Henry" . In Lee, Sidney (ed.). Dictionary of National Biography. Vol. 57. London: Smith, Elder & Co. pp. 246–248.
- Lavery, Brian (2003). Jack Aubrey Commands: An Historical Companion to the Naval World of Patrick O'Brian. London: Naval Institute Press. ISBN 9781591144038.
- Lloyd, Christopher (1963). St Vincent & Camperdown. London: B. T. Batsford Ltd.
- Manwaring, G. E.; Dobree, Bonamy (2004) [1934]. The Floating Republic: An account of the Mutinies at Spithead and the Nore in 1797. Barnsley: Pen & Sword. ISBN 978-1-84415-095-3.
- Mostert, Noel (2007). The Line upon a Wind: The Greatest War Fought at Sea Under Sail 1793–1815. Vintage Books. ISBN 978-0-7126-0927-2.
- Padfield, Peter (2000) [1976]. Nelson's War. Wordsworth Military Library. ISBN 978-1-84022-225-8.
- Parkinson, C. Northcote (1954). War in the Eastern Seas, 1793–1815. London: George Allen & Unwin Ltd.
- Pakenham, Thomas (2000) [1997]. The Year of Liberty: The Story of the Great Irish Rebellion of 1798. London: Abacus. ISBN 978-0-349-11252-7.
- Rodger, N.A.M. (2004). The Command of the Ocean. Allan Lane. ISBN 978-0-7139-9411-7.
- Tracy, Nicholas, ed. (1998). "Biographical Memoirs of Adam Duncan, Lord Viscount Duncan". The Naval Chronicle, Volume 1, 1793–1798. Chatham Publishing. ISBN 978-1-86176-091-3.

== Ships named after the battle ==
4 ships and a stone frigate were named HMS Camperdown.
