= Dutch ship Gelijkheid =

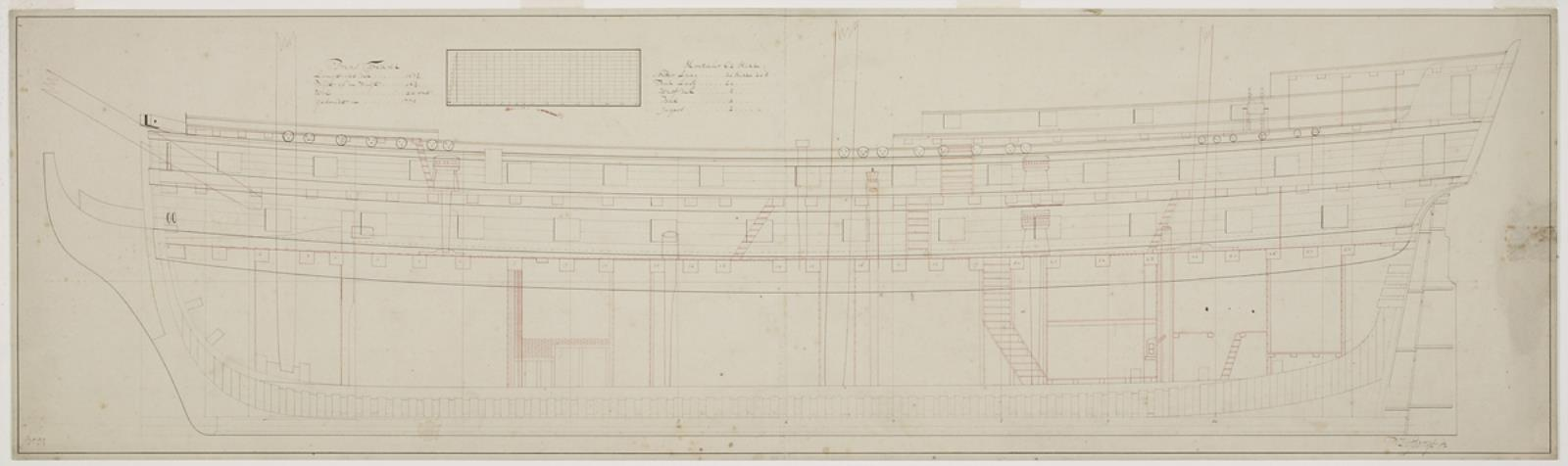
- Plan of Prins Frederik Willem

History

Dutch Republic
- Name: Prins Frederik Willem
- Laid down: June 1777
- Commissioned: 1781
- Decommissioned: 1795

Batavian Republic
- Name: Gelijkheid
- Commissioned: 1795
- In service: 1795
- Out of service: 1797
- Captured: 11 October 1797
- Fate: Captured

Great Britain
- Name: HMS Gelykheid
- Acquired: 1797
- Commissioned: 1797
- Decommissioned: 1814
- Reclassified: Prison ship in 1799; Guardship from 1803; Sheer hulk from 1807
- Fate: Disposed, 1814

General characteristics
- Class & type: 68-gun ship of the line
- Propulsion: Sails
- Sail plan: Full-rigged ship

Prins Frederik Willem was a 68-gun ship of the line of the Dutch States Navy. The order to construct the ship was given by the Admiralty of Rotterdam. In 1795, the ship was commissioned into the Batavian Navy and renamed Gelijkheid. On 11 October 1797 Gelijkheid took part in the Battle of Camperdown, where she was captured by the British and renamed HMS Gelykheid. In 1799, Gelykheid was a prison ship at Chatham Dockyard. In November 1803 the ship was stationed in the Humber as a guard ship. In 1807, Gelykheid became a sheer hulk at Falmouth, Cornwall and was decommissioned and sold in 1814.
