= HMS Trafalgar (1820) =

Ship of the line of the Royal Navy

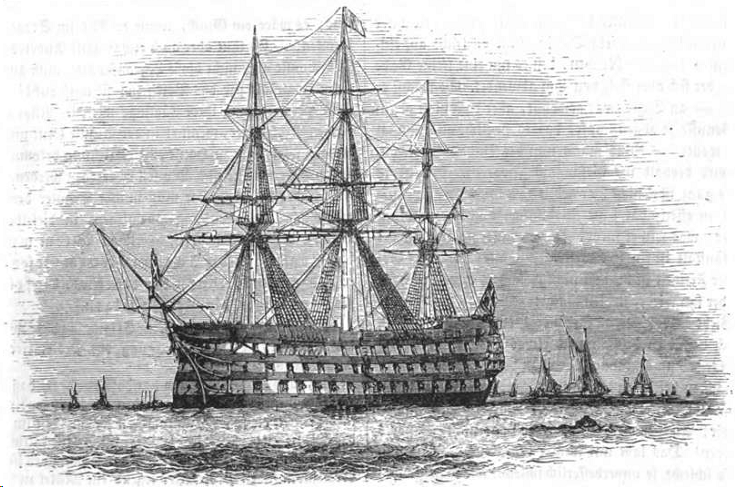
- HMS Camperdown 1843

History

United Kingdom
- Name: HMS Trafalgar
- Ordered: 12 June 1807
- Builder: Chatham Dockyard
- Laid down: May 1813
- Launched: 26 July 1820
- Decommissioned: 1854
- Renamed: HMS Camperdown, 22 February 1825; HMS Pitt, 29 July 1882
- Fate: Sold, May 1906

General characteristics
- Class & type: 98-gun second-rate ship of the line
- Tons burthen: 2,404 bm
- Length: 196 ft (60 m) (gundeck)
- Beam: 52 ft 6 in (16.00 m)
- Depth of hold: 22 ft 8 in (6.91 m)
- Propulsion: Sails
- Sail plan: Full-rigged ship
- Armament: 98 guns: Gundeck: 28 × 32 pdrs; Middle gundeck: 30 × 18 pdrs; Upper gundeck: 30 × 12 pdrs; Quarterdeck: 6 × 12 pdrs, 8 × 32 pdr carronades; Forecastle: 2 × 12 pdrs, 2 × 32 pdr carronades; Poop deck: 6 × 18 pdr carronades

HMS Trafalgar was ordered as a 98-gun second-rate ship of the line, re-rated as a 106-gun first-rate ship of the line whose keel was laid in 1813 and which was launched on 26 July 1820 at Chatham. She was designed by the Surveyors of the Navy (including William Rule), and was the only ship built to her draught.

She was renamed HMS Camperdown on 22 February 1825.

Camperdown was placed on harbour service as a guard ship at Portsmouth in 1854 and became a coal hulk (acting as a floating depot) at Portsmouth in 1860 and remained there thereafter.

She cannot have been the hulk referred to in the unpublished diary of Col. Archibald Butter (1857) as lying in Simons Bay, near Cape Town, South Africa: 'The Camperdown a hulk is kept as a store ship'. She was renamed HMS Pitt on 29 July 1882 and was sold to Henry Castle & Sons on 15 May 1906 and was broken up at Charlton, London.
