= Dutch ship Beschermer (1784) =

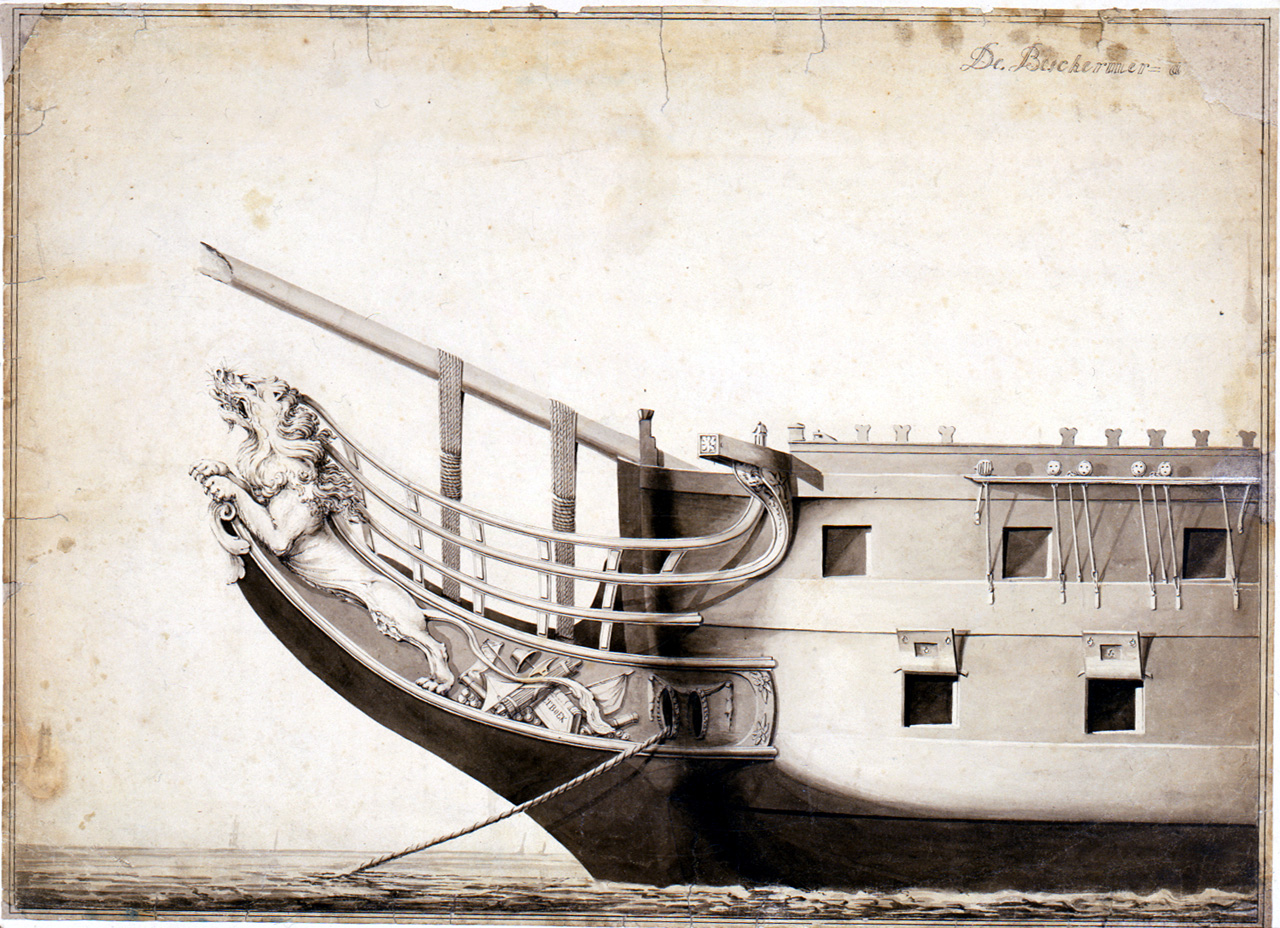
- Figurehead and bow of Beschermer

History

Dutch Republic
- Name: Beschermer
- Builder: Enkhuizen
- Laid down: 1781
- Launched: 1784

Batavian Republic
- Name: Beschermer
- Captured: 30 August 1799

Great Britain
- Name: HMS Beschermer
- Acquired: 1799
- Commissioned: 1799
- Decommissioned: 1806
- Out of service: Lent to the East India Dock Company in 1806
- Reclassified: Guard ship in 1801; Store ship from 1805
- Fate: Sold, September 1838

General characteristics
- Class & type: 54-gun fourth-rate ship of the line
- Tons burthen: 1,051 67/94 (bm)
- Length: 145 ft 1 in (44.2 m) (gundeck); 118 ft 7 in (36.1 m) (keel)
- Beam: 40 ft 10 in (12.4 m)
- Depth of hold: 16 ft 4 in (5.0 m)
- Sail plan: Full-rigged ship
- Armament: In British service; Lower gundeck: 24 × 18-pounder guns; Upper gundeck: 24 × 32-pounder carronades; Quarterdeck: 6 × 32-pounder carronades; Forecastle: 2 × 32-pounder carronades; As refitted; 20 × 24-pounder guns; 20 × 18-pounder guns; Quarterdeck: 6 × 6-pounder guns; Forecastle: 2 × 6-pounder guns

Beschermer was a 54-gun ship of the line of the Dutch States Navy. The order to construct the ship was given by the Admiralty of the Noorderkwartier. In 1795 she became part of the Batavian Navy, following the French invasion of the Netherlands.

On 11 October 1797 Beschermer took part in the Battle of Camperdown under Captain Dooitze Eelkes Hinxt. The ship escaped the battle after Hinxt was severely wounded. On 30 August 1799 Beschermer, under Captain Eilbrach, was surrendered to the British during the Vlieter incident. The Royal Navy then commissioned the ship as HMS Beschermer and used her in various subsidiary roles.

In 1801 Beschermer served as a guard ship in the Swin. She was fitted as a storeship in 1805. Beschermer was lent to the East India Dock Company for use as a hulk at Blackwall in 1806 until she was sold for breaking up in September 1838. Beschermer was eventually broken up in 1838.
