= Dutch ship Vrijheid =

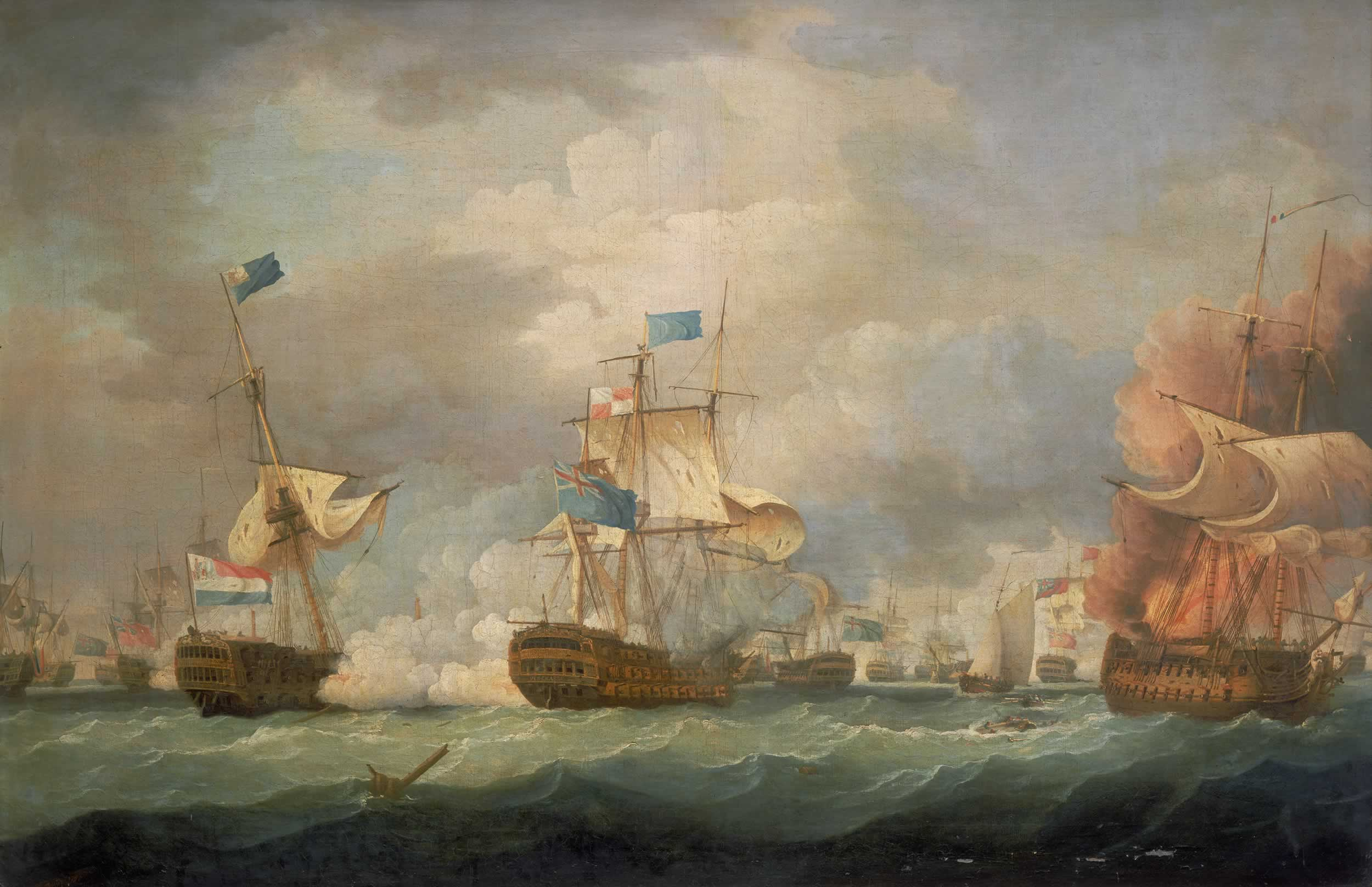
- Vrijheid (left) at the Battle of Camperdown

History

Dutch Republic
- Name: Vrijheid
- Launched: 1782
- Commissioned: 1782
- Decommissioned: 1795

Batavian Republic
- Name: Vrijheid
- Commissioned: 1795
- In service: 1795
- Captured: 11 October 1797

Great Britain
- Name: HMS Vryheid
- Acquired: 1797
- Commissioned: 1797
- Decommissioned: 1811
- Reclassified: Prison ship in 1798; Powder hulk from 1802
- Fate: Disposed in 1811

General characteristics
- Class & type: 74-gun ship of the line
- Propulsion: Sails
- Sail plan: Full-rigged ship
- Armament: 74 Guns

Vrijheid was a 74-gun ship of the line of the Dutch States Navy. The order to construct the ship was given by the Admiralty of Amsterdam. The ship was commissioned in 1782. In 1783, a squadron consisting of the ships Vrijheid, Noordholland, Hercules, Drenthe, Prins Willem and Harlingen was dispatched to the Mediterranean to deal with differences that had arisen with Venice. On 2 February 1784, the squadron docked at the coast near the island of Menorca. In the night between 3 and 4 February, a storm struck which lasted for 48 hours. Vrijheid was almost smashed on the rocks and only just managed to stay afloat, while Drenthe keeled over and sank.

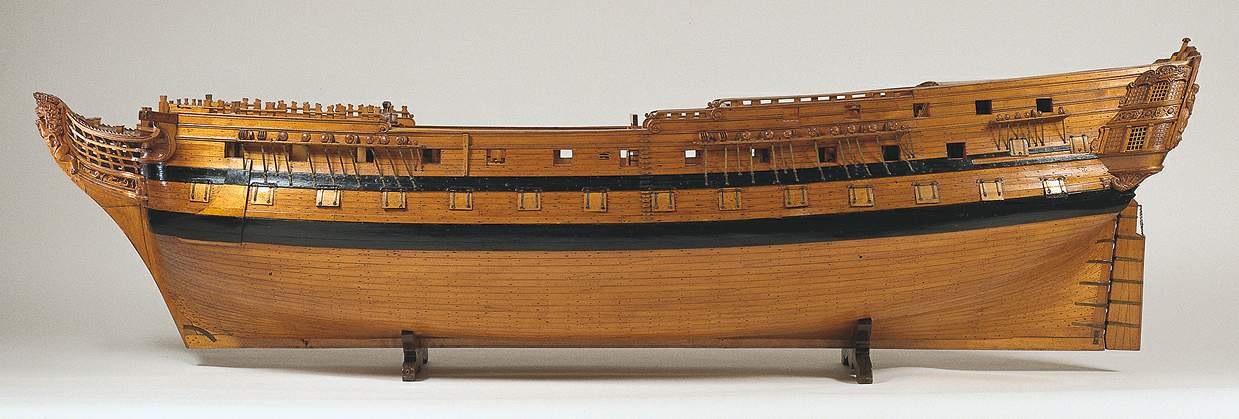
Model of Vrijheid

In 1795, the ship was commissioned in the Batavian Navy. On 11 October 1797, Vrijheid took part in the Battle of Camperdown as the flagship of Admiral Jan Willem de Winter. At a certain point, Vrijheid was engaged by four British ships, and after heavy fighting the ship surrendered. The ship was renamed HMS Vryheid, and from 1798 she served as a prison ship. In 1802, she became a powder hulk until she was sold in 1811.
