= Jan Willem de Winter =

Dutch military officer and diplomat (1761–1812)

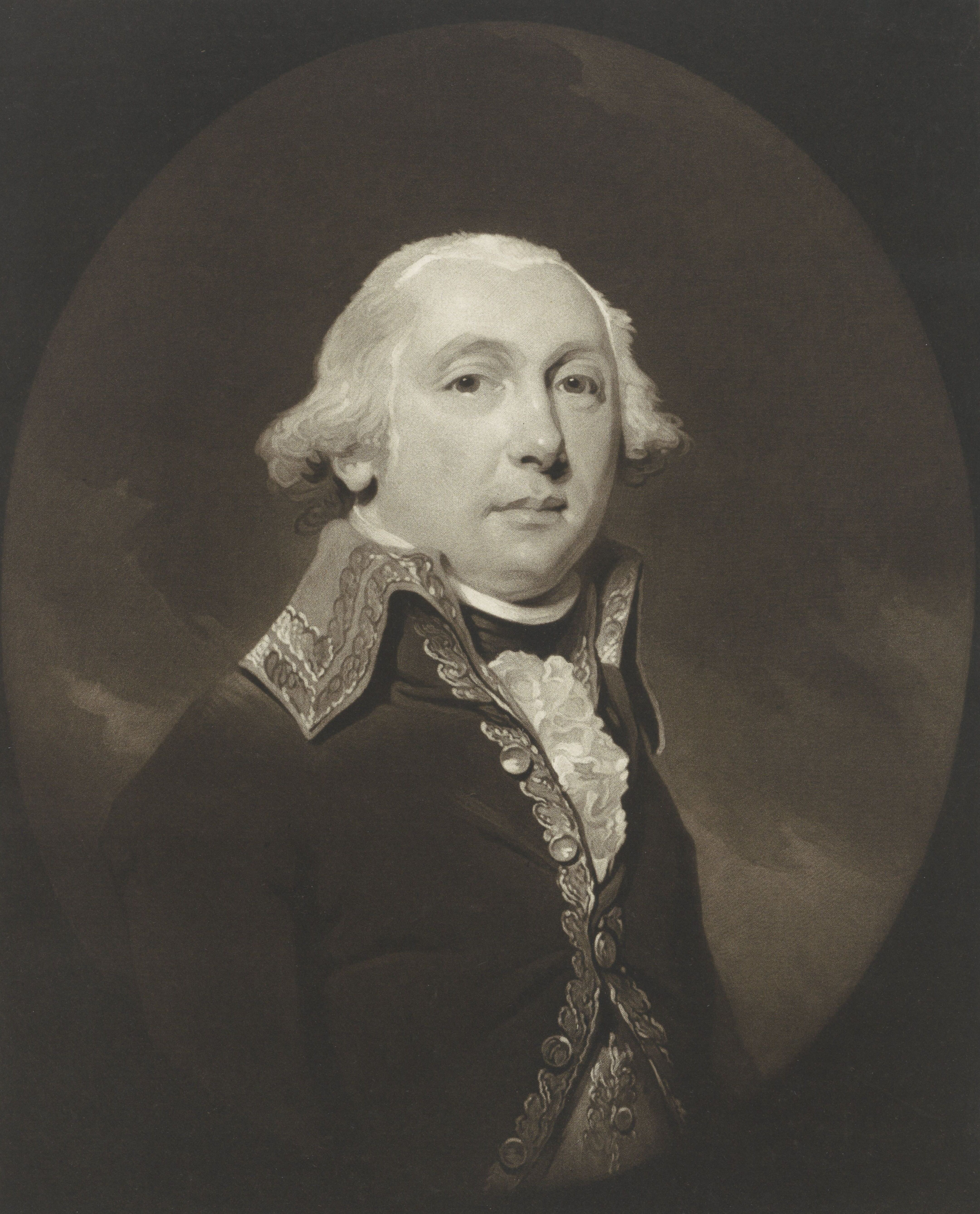
- Born: 23 March 1761; Kampen, Dutch Republic
- Died: 2 June 1812 (aged 51); Paris, France
- Military career
- Allegiance: Dutch Republic; French First Republic; Batavian Republic; Kingdom of Holland; First French Empire
- Branch: Dutch States Navy; French Revolutionary Army; Batavian Navy; Navy of the Kingdom of Holland; French Imperial Navy
- Service years: 1771–1812
- Rank: Brigade general (French Revolutionary Army); Vice admiral (Batavian Navy)
- Wars: French Revolutionary Wars; Napoleonic Wars
- Awards: Legion of Honour

Jan Willem de Winter (23 March 1761 – 2 June 1812) was a Dutch military officer and diplomat who served in the French Revolutionary and Napoleonic Wars. He is best known for commanding the Batavian Navy fleet which was defeated by the Royal Navy at the Battle of Camperdown in 1797.

== Early life ==
De Winter giving his sword to Adam Duncan at the Battle of Camperdown

Jan Willem de Winter was born in Kampen and entered the Dutch States Navy at a young age. He distinguished himself by his zeal and courage, and by the time of the Patriottentijd in 1787 had reached the rank of lieutenant. The overthrow of the Patriot faction forced him to flee to France.

== Naval career ==
Here he threw himself heart and soul into the cause of the French Revolution, and served in the French Revolutionary Army under Charles François Dumouriez and Charles Pichegru in the campaigns of 1792 and 1793, and was soon promoted to the rank of brigade general.

In 1795, when Pichegru overran the Dutch Republic, De Winter returned with the French army to his native country. The new regime now utilized the experience he had gained as a naval officer by giving him the post of adjunct-general for the reorganization of the Batavian Navy. In 1796, he was appointed vice admiral and commander-in-chief of the Batavian navy. He spared no efforts to strengthen it and improve its condition, and on 11 October 1797 he led a fleet which fought the Battle of Camperdown against a British fleet under Admiral Adam Duncan.

After an obstinate struggle, the Batavian fleet was defeated, and de Winter himself was taken prisoner. He remained in England until December, when he gave his parole and was released. His conduct in the Battle of Camperdown was declared by a court-martial to have nobly maintained the honour of the Batavian flag.

== Diplomatic career ==
From 1798 to 1802, De Winter filled the post of ambassador to the French Republic and was then once more appointed commander of the fleet. He was sent with a strong squadron to the Mediterranean to repress the Tripoli pirates, and negotiated a treaty of peace with the Tripolitan government. De Winter enjoyed the confidence of Louis Bonaparte, then King of Holland, and, after the incorporation of the Netherlands in the French empire, in an equal degree of the emperor Napoleon. By the former, he was created Marshal of Holland and Count of Huessen, and given the command of the armed forces both by sea and land.

== Later life and death ==
Napoleon gave De Winter the grand cross of the Legion of Honour and appointed him inspector general of the northern coasts, and in 1811, he placed him at the head of the fleet he had collected at Texel. Soon afterwards, De Winter was taken ill and compelled to go to Paris, where he died on 2 June 1812. He had a splendid public funeral and was buried in the Panthéon. His heart was enclosed in an urn and placed in the Bovenkerk Church in Kampen.
