= List of Allied vessels involved in Operation Neptune =

Operation Neptune, a phase of the European Theatre of World War II, was an undertaking by the Allies to invade the Northern coast of Nazi-occupied France. Following is a list of Allied vessels that took part in the operation.

== Tallies ==
Nation	Combat	Auxiliary	Amphibious	Totals
Australia		1		1
Canada	7	1		8
Free France	4			4
Netherlands	2			2
Norway	2	1		3
Poland	4			4
United Kingdom	95	10	1	106
United States	27	32	21	80
Totals	143	43	22	208

== List of vessels ==
Ship	Nation	Category	Type	Neptune Loss
USS Achernar (AKA-53)	(United States) US	auxiliary	attack cargo	
HMS Adventure (M23)	(United Kingdom) UK	auxiliary	support & repair	
HMS Ajax (22)	(United Kingdom) UK	combat vessel	light cruiser	Took part in the shelling of German positions on Gold Beach
HMNZS Monowai (F59)	(United Kingdom) UK	infantry landing ship	landing ship, infantry	
HMAS Albatross (1928)	(Australia) Aus	auxiliary	support & repair	
HMCS Alberni (K103)	(Canada) Can	combat vessel	corvette	
HMCS Algonquin (R17)	(Canada) Can	combat vessel	destroyer	
USS Amesbury (DE-66)	(United States) US	combat vessel	destroyer escort	
USS Ancon (AGC-4)	(United States) US	auxiliary	amph. command ship	
USS Anne Arundel (AP-76)	(United States) US	auxiliary	transport	
SS Antenor (1924)	(United Kingdom) UK	auxiliary	transport	
HMS Arethusa (26)	(United Kingdom) UK	combat vessel	light cruiser	Naval bombardment during the operation, but also used her guns to support troops under fire from the Germans the following day.
HMS Argonaut (61)	(United Kingdom) UK	combat vessel	light cruiser	
USS Arkansas (BB-33)	(United States) US	combat vessel	old battleship	
HMS Ashanti (F51)	(United Kingdom) UK	combat vessel	destroyer	
SS Audacious (1913)	(United States) US	auxiliary	transport / block ship	scuttled as breakwater
USS Augusta (CA-31)	(United States) US	combat vessel	heavy cruiser	
USS Auk (AM-57)	(United States) US	auxiliary	minesweeper	
HMS Avon Vale (L06)	(United Kingdom) UK	combat vessel	destroyer	
USS Baldwin (DD-624)	(United States) US	combat vessel	destroyer	
USS Barnett (APA-5)	(United States) US	auxiliary	attack transport	
USS Barton (DD-722)	(United States) US	combat vessel	destroyer	
USS Bates (DE-68)	(United States) US	combat vessel	destroyer escort	
USS Bayfield (APA-33)	(United States) US	auxiliary	attack transport	
HMS Beagle (H30)	(United Kingdom) UK	combat vessel	destroyer	
HMS Belfast (C35)	(United Kingdom) UK	combat vessel	light cruiser	
HMS Bellona (63)	(United Kingdom) UK	combat vessel	light cruiser	
HMS Black Prince (81)	(United Kingdom) UK	combat vessel	light cruiser	
HMS Blankney (L30)	(United Kingdom) UK	combat vessel	destroyer	
USS Blessman (DE-69)	(United States) US	combat vessel	destroyer escort	
ORP Błyskawica	(Poland) Pol	combat vessel	destroyer	
HMS Boadicea (H65)	(United Kingdom) UK	combat vessel	destroyer	
HMS Boxer (F121)	(United Kingdom) UK	amphibious	landing ship, tank	
USS Broadbill (AM-58)	(United States) US	auxiliary	minesweeper	
HMS Bulolo	(United Kingdom) UK	auxiliary	landing ship, headquarters	
HMS Campbell (D60)	(United Kingdom) UK	combat vessel	destroyer leader	
HMCS Cape Breton (K350)	(Canada) Can	combat vessel	frigate	
HMS Capetown (D88)	(United Kingdom) UK	combat vessel	light cruiser	
USS Carmick (DD-493)	(United States) US	combat vessel	destroyer	
HMS Centurion (1911)	(United Kingdom) UK	auxiliary	block ship	Deliberately scuttled as breakwater
HMS Ceres (D59)	(United Kingdom) UK	combat vessel	light cruiser	
USS Charles Carroll (APA-28)	(United States) US	auxiliary	attack transport	
USS Chickadee (AM-59)	(United States) US	auxiliary	minesweeper	
USS Corry (DD-463)	(United States) US	combat vessel	destroyer	mine / shore batteries
FNFL Courbet (1911)	(France) Fr	auxiliary	block ship	scuttled as breakwater
HMCS Cowichan (J146)	(Canada) Can	auxiliary	minesweeper	
HMS Cygnet (H83)	(United Kingdom) UK	combat vessel	destroyer	
HMS Dacres (K472)	(United Kingdom) UK	combat vessel	frigate	
HMS Danae (D44)	(United Kingdom) UK	combat vessel	light cruiser	
HMS Decoy (H75)	(United Kingdom) UK	combat vessel	destroyer	
HMS Despatch (D30)	(United Kingdom) UK	combat vessel	light cruiser	
HMS Diadem (84)	(United Kingdom) UK	combat vessel	light cruiser	
USS Dorothea L. Dix (AP-67)	(United States) US	auxiliary	transport	
SS Dover Hill	(United Kingdom) UK	auxiliary	block ship	scuttled as breakwater
USS Doyle (DMS-34)	(United States) US	auxiliary	fast minesweeper	
HMS Dragon (D46)	(United Kingdom) UK	combat vessel	light cruiser	
HMS Durban (D99)	(United Kingdom) UK	auxiliary	block ship	scuttled as breakwater
HMS Emerald (D66)	(United Kingdom) UK	combat vessel	light cruiser	
USS Emmons (DD-457)	(United States) US	combat vessel	destroyer	
SS Empire Bunting	(United Kingdom) UK	auxiliary	block ship	scuttled as breakwater
HMS Enterprise (D52)	(United Kingdom) UK	combat vessel	light cruiser	
HMS Erebus (I02)	(United Kingdom) UK	combat vessel	monitor	
HMS Eskimo (F75)	(United Kingdom) UK	combat vessel	destroyer	
HMS Express (H61)	(United Kingdom) UK	auxiliary	destroyer/minelayer	
HMS Fame (H78)	(United Kingdom) UK	combat vessel	destroyer	
HMS Faulknor (H62)	(United Kingdom) UK	combat vessel	destroyer	
HNLMS Flores	(Netherlands) Ned	combat vessel	gunboat	
HMS Forester (H74)	(United Kingdom) UK	combat vessel	destroyer	
USS Frankford (DD-497)	(United States) US	combat vessel	destroyer	
HMS Frobisher (D81)	(United Kingdom) UK	combat vessel	heavy cruiser	
HMS Fury (H76)	(United Kingdom) UK	combat vessel	destroyer	struck mine, not repaired
FNFL Georges Leygues	(France) Fr	combat vessel	light cruiser	
HMS Glasgow (C21)	(United Kingdom) UK	combat vessel	light cruiser	
USS Glennon (DD-620)	(United States) US	combat vessel	destroyer	
HMS Grenville (R97)	(United Kingdom) UK	combat vessel	destroyer	
HMS Griffin (H31)	(United Kingdom) UK	combat vessel	destroyer	
HMCS Haida (G63)	(Canada) Can	combat vessel	destroyer	
USS Harding (DD-625)	(United States) US	combat vessel	destroyer	
HMS Havelock (H88)	(United Kingdom) UK	combat vessel	destroyer	
HMS Hawkins (D86)	(United Kingdom) UK	combat vessel	heavy cruiser	
USS Henrico (APA-45)	(United States) US	auxiliary	attack transport	
HMS Hero (H99)	(United Kingdom) UK	combat vessel	destroyer	
USS Hobson (DD-464)	(United States) US	combat vessel	destroyer	
HMCS Huron (G24)	(Canada) Can	combat vessel	destroyer	
HMS Impulsive (D11)	(United Kingdom) UK	combat vessel	destroyer	
HMS Inconstant (H49)	(United Kingdom) UK	combat vessel	destroyer	
SS Iserlohn (1909)	(United Kingdom) UK	auxiliary	block ship	scuttled as breakwater
HMS Isis (D87)	(United Kingdom) UK	combat vessel	destroyer	struck mine
HMS Javelin (F61)	(United Kingdom) UK	combat vessel	destroyer	
SS Jeremiah O'Brien	(United States) US	auxiliary	cargo ship	
HMS Jervis (F00)	(United Kingdom) UK	combat vessel	destroyer	
USS Joseph T. Dickman (APA-13)	(United States) US	auxiliary	attack transport	
HMS Kelvin (F37)	(United Kingdom) UK	combat vessel	destroyer	
HMS Kempenfelt (R03)	(United Kingdom) UK	combat vessel	destroyer leader	
HMS Kingsmill (K484)	(United Kingdom) UK	combat vessel	frigate	
HMCS Kitchener (K225)	(Canada) Can	combat vessel	corvette	
ORP Krakowiak (L115)	(Poland) Pol	combat vessel	destroyer escort	
FNFL La Combattante	(France) Fr	combat vessel	destroyer	
USS Laffey (DD-724)	(United States) US	combat vessel	destroyer	
HMS Largs	(United Kingdom) UK	auxiliary	headquarters ship	
HMS Lawford (K514)	(United Kingdom) UK	combat vessel	frigate	aerial attack
HMS Londonderry (U76)	(United Kingdom) UK	combat vessel	sloop	
HMS Loch Fada (K390)	(United Kingdom) UK	combat vessel	frigate	
HMS Loch Killin (K391)	(United Kingdom) UK	combat vessel	frigate	
HMS Locust (T28)	(United Kingdom) UK	combat vessel	river gunboat	
USS LST-5	(United States) US	amphibious	landing ship, tank	
USS LST-57	(United States) US	amphibious	landing ship, tank	
USS LST-209	(United States) US	amphibious	landing ship, tank	
USS LST-266	(United States) US	amphibious	landing ship, tank	
USS LST-279	(United States) US	amphibious	landing ship, tank	
USS LST-288	(United States) US	amphibious	landing ship, tank	
USS LST-306	(United States) US	amphibious	landing ship, tank	
USS LST-344	(United States) US	amphibious	landing ship, tank	
USS LST-356	(United States) US	amphibious	landing ship, tank	
USS LST-371	(United States) US	amphibious	landing ship, tank	
USS LST-380	(United States) US	amphibious	landing ship, tank	
USS LST-389	(United States) US	amphibious	landing ship, tank	
USS LST-509	(United States) US	amphibious	landing ship, tank	
USS LST-515	(United States) US	amphibious	landing ship, tank	
USS LST-516	(United States) US	amphibious	landing ship, tank	
USS LST-519	(United States) US	amphibious	landing ship, tank	
USS LST-521	(United States) US	amphibious	landing ship, tank	
USS LST-529	(United States) US	amphibious	landing ship, tank	
USS LST-532	(United States) US	amphibious	landing ship, tank	
USS LST-533	(United States) US	amphibious	landing ship, tank	
USS LST-542	(United States) US	amphibious	landing ship, tank	
HMS Loyalty (J217)	(United Kingdom) UK	auxiliary	minesweeper	
HMS Magpie (U82)	(United Kingdom) UK	combat vessel	sloop	
HMS Malaya	(United Kingdom) UK	combat vessel	old battleship	
HMS Mauritius (80)	(United Kingdom) UK	combat vessel	light cruiser	
USS McCook (DD-496)	(United States) US	combat vessel	destroyer	
USS Meredith (DD-726)	(United States) US	combat vessel	destroyer	An explosion caused the vessel to take on water, and though abandoned, did not sink. She was later towed away from France towards Britain, but was rocked by a large explosion, split into two and then sank.
HMS Middleton (L74)	(United Kingdom) UK	combat vessel	destroyer	
FNFL Montcalm (1935)	(France) Fr	combat vessel	light cruiser	
HMS Montrose (D01)	(United Kingdom) UK	combat vessel	destroyer leader	
USS Murphy (DD-603)	(United States) US	combat vessel	destroyer	
HMS Nelson (28)	(United Kingdom) UK	combat vessel	battleship	
USS Nevada (BB-36)	(United States) US	combat vessel	old battleship	
USS Nuthatch (AM-60)	(United States) US	auxiliary	minesweeper	
HNoMS Nordkapp	(Norway) Nor	auxiliary	patrol ship	
USS O'Brien (DD-725)	(United States) US	combat vessel	destroyer	
HMS Onslow (G17)	(United Kingdom) UK	combat vessel	destroyer	
HMS Oribi (G66)	(United Kingdom) UK	combat vessel	destroyer	
HMS Orion (85)	(United Kingdom) UK	combat vessel	light cruiser	
USS Osprey (AM-56)	(United States) US	auxiliary	minesweeper	struck mine
USS Partridge (ATO-138)	(United States) US	auxiliary	minesweeper	torpedoed by E-boat
USS PC-1261	(United States) US	auxiliary	submarine chaser	shore batteries
USS Pheasant (AM-61)	(United States) US	auxiliary	minesweeper	
ORP Piorun (G65)	(Poland) Pol	combat vessel	destroyer	
USS Quincy (CA-71)	(United States) US	combat vessel	heavy cruiser	
HMS Ramillies (07)	(United Kingdom) UK	combat vessel	old battleship	
USS Raven (AM-55)	(United States) US	auxiliary	minesweeper	
USS Rich (DE-695)	(United States) US	combat vessel	destroyer escort	struck mine
HMS Roberts (F40)	(United Kingdom) UK	combat vessel	monitor	
USS Rodman (DD-456)	(United States) US	combat vessel	destroyer	
HMS Rodney (29)	(United Kingdom) UK	combat vessel	battleship	
USS Samuel Chase (APA-26)	(United States) US	auxiliary	attack transport	
USS Satterlee (DD-626)	(United States) US	combat vessel	destroyer	
HMS Saumarez (G12)	(United Kingdom) UK	combat vessel	destroyer	
HMS Scourge (G01)	(United Kingdom) UK	combat vessel	destroyer	
HMS Scylla (98)	(United Kingdom) UK	combat vessel	destroyer leader	
USS Shubrick (DD-639)	(United States) US	combat vessel	destroyer	
HMCS Sioux (R64)	(Canada) Can	combat vessel	destroyer	
HMS Sirius (82)	(United Kingdom) UK	combat vessel	light cruiser	
HMS Skate (1917)	(United Kingdom) UK	combat vessel	destroyer	
ORP Ślązak (L26)	(Poland) Pol	combat vessel	destroyer	
HNLMS Soemba	(Netherlands) Ned	combat vessel	gunboat	
USS Staff (AM-114)	(United States) US	auxiliary	minesweeper	
HMS Starling (U66)	(United Kingdom) UK	combat vessel	sloop	
HMS Statice (K281)	(United Kingdom) UK	combat vessel	corvette	
HMS Stevenstone (L16)	(United Kingdom) UK	combat vessel	destroyer	
HNoMS Stord (G26)	(Norway) Nor	combat vessel	destroyer	
HNoMS Svenner (G03)	(Norway) Nor	combat vessel	destroyer	torpedoed by E-boat
USS Swift (AM-122)	(United States) US	auxiliary	minesweeper	
HMS Tanatside (L69)	(United Kingdom) UK	combat vessel	destroyer	
USS Texas (BB-35)	(United States) US	combat vessel	old battleship	
USS Thomas Jefferson (APA-30)	(United States) US	auxiliary	attack transport	
USS Thompson (DD-627)	(United States) US	combat vessel	destroyer	
USS Threat (AM-124)	(United States) US	auxiliary	minesweeper	
USS Thurston (AP-77)	(United States) US	auxiliary	transport	
USS Tide (AM-125)	(United States) US	auxiliary	minesweeper	struck mine
USS Tuscaloosa (CA-37)	(United States) US	combat vessel	heavy cruiser	
HMS Ulster (R83)	(United Kingdom) UK	combat vessel	destroyer	
HMS Ulysses (R69)	(United Kingdom) UK	combat vessel	destroyer	
HMS Undaunted (R53)	(United Kingdom) UK	combat vessel	destroyer	
HMS Undine (R42)	(United Kingdom) UK	combat vessel	destroyer	
HMS Urania (R05)	(United Kingdom) UK	combat vessel	destroyer	
HMS Urchin (R99)	(United Kingdom) UK	combat vessel	destroyer	
HMS Ursa (R22)	(United Kingdom) UK	combat vessel	destroyer	
HMS Vanquisher (D54)	(United Kingdom) UK	combat vessel	destroyer	
HMS Venus (R50)	(United Kingdom) UK	combat vessel	destroyer	
HMS Versatile (D32)	(United Kingdom) UK	combat vessel	destroyer	
HMS Verulam (R28)	(United Kingdom) UK	combat vessel	destroyer	
HMS Vesper (D55)	(United Kingdom) UK	combat vessel	destroyer	
HMS Vigilant (R93)	(United Kingdom) UK	combat vessel	destroyer	
HMS Virago (R75)	(United Kingdom) UK	combat vessel	destroyer	
HMS Vivacious (D36)	(United Kingdom) UK	combat vessel	destroyer	
HMS Volunteer (D71)	(United Kingdom) UK	combat vessel	destroyer	
HMS Walker (D27)	(United Kingdom) UK	combat vessel	destroyer	
HMS Wanderer (D74)	(United Kingdom) UK	combat vessel	destroyer	
HMS Warspite (03)	(United Kingdom) UK	combat vessel	old battleship	
HMS Watchman (D26)	(United Kingdom) UK	combat vessel	destroyer	
SS West Cheswald	(United States) US	auxiliary	block ship	scuttled as breakwater
MS West Grama	(United States) US	auxiliary	block ship	scuttled as breakwater
MS West Honaker	(United States) US	auxiliary	block ship	scuttled as breakwater
SS West Nohno	(United States) US	auxiliary	block ship	scuttled as breakwater
HMS Whimbrel (U29)	(United Kingdom) UK	combat vessel	sloop	
HMS Whitehall (D94)	(United Kingdom) UK	combat vessel	destroyer	
HMS Wild Goose (U45)	(United Kingdom) UK	combat vessel	sloop	
HMS Wrestler (1918)	(United Kingdom) UK	combat vessel	destroyer	struck mine, not repaired

== See also ==
- List of Allied warships in the Normandy landings
