= Aeolus (disambiguation) =

Aeolus is the name of various figures in Greek mythology.

Aeolus or Aiolos may also refer to:

== Places ==
=== North America ===
- Mount Aeolus (Alberta), Canada
- Mount Aeolus (Vermont), US
- Aeolus Cave, Vermont, US

=== Antarctica ===
- Mount Aeolus (Antarctica), Victoria Land
- Aeolus Ridge, Alexander Island

== Land transportation ==
- Aeolus (motorcycle 1903–1905), a 492cc single-cylinder bike made by Bown in England
- Aeolus (motorcycle 1914–1916), a 147cc two-stroke bike made by Bown in England
- Aeolus Railroad Car, an early 19th-century wind-propelled experiment
- Chicago, Burlington and Quincy 4000, a steam locomotive
- Aeolus (marque), a Chinese automotive brand name, originally called the Fengshen

== Ships ==
- HMS Aeolus, several ships of the British Royal Navy
- USS Aeolus, several ships of the US Navy
- Aeolus (1850), a wooden ketch built in Australia
- SS Aiolos, a steamship built in Scotland and eventually sold to Liberia and renamed Aiolos in 1959
- Aeolus (jack-up crane ship), wind turbine installation vessel built by J. J. Sietas in 2014
- Aeolus (flagship) [nl], flagship of Admiral Jacob van Heemskerk

== Arts and entertainment ==
- "Aeolus" (Ulysses episode) an episode in James Joyce's novel Ulysses
- Sagittarius Aiolos, a character in the Japanese manga Saint Seiya
- Aeolus, a boss character from the 2007 game Mega Man ZX Advent
- Aeolus, a ghost ship in the 2009 film Triangle
- Aeolus, a ghost ship in the 2018 film The Boat

== Other uses ==
- ADM-Aeolus, a European earth observation satellite launched in 2018
- Aeolus (beetle), a genus of click beetles
- Aiolos Astakou B.C., a Greek professional basketball club based in Astakos
- Aiolos Trikalon, a Greek former professional basketball club that was based in Trikala
- IKZF3, a protein in humans also called zinc finger protein Aiolos
- Aiolos (star), HD 95086 in the constellation Carina
