= Aeolian =

Aeolian commonly refers to things related to either of two Greek mythological figures:

- Aeolus (son of Hippotes), ruler of the winds
- Aeolus (son of Hellen), son of Hellen and eponym of the Aeolians
- Aeolians, an ancient Greek tribe thought to be descended from Aeolus, son of Hellen

Aeolian or Eolian may also refer to:

== Music ==
- Aeolian (album), an album by German post-metal band The Ocean Collective
- Aeolian Company (1887–1985), a maker of organs, pianos, sheet music, and phonographs
- Aeolian Hall (disambiguation), any one of a number of concert halls of that name
- Aeolian harp, a harp that is played by the wind
- Aeolian mode, a musical mode, the natural minor key
- Aeolian Quartet (1952–1981), a string quartet based in London
- Aeolian-Skinner (1932–1972), pipe organ builder

== Other uses ==
- Aeolian dialect, a dialect of Ancient Greek
- Aeolian Islands, islands in the Tyrrhenian Sea, named after Aeolus the ruler of the winds
- Aeolian or Aeolic order, an early order of Classical architecture
- Aeolian landform, landforms, such as sand dunes, formed by wind
- Aeolian processes, eolian sedimentation, wind-generated geologic processes
- Eolian (Solar car), a solar car designed at the University of Chile

== See also ==
- Eolianite, a sandstone formed from wind-transported sediment
- Aeolia (disambiguation)
- Aeolic, the Ancient Greek dialect of the Aeolians
- Aeolus (disambiguation)
- Eolienne (also spelled aeolian), a lightweight fabric similar to poplin
