= Aeolus (ship) =

Several ships have been named Aeolus for one or another of the mythical figures named Aeolus.

- Æolus (1783 ship) was a snow built at Åbenrå in Denmark as a West Indiaman. The British Royal Navy captured her in 1807. Buckle & Co. purchased her as a prize. In 1808-9 she transported convicts to Port Jackson, New South Wales. She was last listed in Lloyd's Register in 1816.
- Æolus (1787 ship) (or Eolus) was built in Liverpool. Between 1787 and 1806 she made 13 voyages as a slave ship in the triangular trade in enslaved people. She was last listed in 1808.
- Aeolus (1795 ship), of 169 or 175 tons (bm), was built by James Walmsley, North Shields. She was wrecked on 28 May 1860 near Winterton, Norfolk, on a voyage from Sunderland to London with a cargo of coal.
- Aeolus (1850) was a wooden ketch built at Pyrmont, New South Wales, Australia. She was carrying timber to Sydney, New South Wales, when she was lost at Hole in the Wall, Jervis Bay, New South Wales, on 24 October 1867.

== See also ==
- HMS Aeolus - any of five vessels of the Royal Navy of that name
