= Aeolia =

Aeolia or Eolia may refer to:

- Aeolia, daughter of Amythaon and wife of Calydon
- Aeolia (mythical island), the mythical floating island (nesos Aiolios) visited by Odysseus in Homer's Odyssey
- Aeolis or Aeolia in Anatolia
- Thessaly or Aeolia
- Aeolia Schenberg, a character in the 2007-2009 Japanese anime television series Mobile Suit Gundam 00
- Aeolia (album), a 2006 album by Leprous
- Eolia 25, a French sailboat design
- Eolia-Harkness Estate, the former name of the Harkness Memorial State Park in Waterford, Connecticut, United States
- Eolia, Missouri, a village in Pike County, Missouri, United States
- Eolia, Kentucky, an unincorporated community in Letcher County, Kentucky, United States
- Leo Aiolia, a major character in Saint Seiya
- 396 Aeolia, a typical main belt asteroid

== See also ==
- Aeolian (disambiguation)
