= Tommy Gate =

- Industry: Commercial Truck Equipment
- Founded: 1965
- Founder: Delbert Brown
- Headquarters: Woodbine, Iowa, United States
- Products: Hydraulic Liftgates
- Parent: Woodbine Manufacturing Company
- Website: www.tommygate.com

Tommy Gate is an American brand of hydraulic liftgate, or tail lift, manufactured by Woodbine Manufacturing Company. The company was formed in 1965 by Delbert "Bus" Brown and its production facility is located in Woodbine, Iowa.

== History ==
Prior to founding Woodbine Manufacturing Company, Delbert Brown manufactured farming equipment under the name of Brown Manufacturing Company. After inventing what was then one of the first trenching machines, Brown Manufacturing Company was sold to Omaha Steel Works. Three years later, Brown founded Woodbine Manufacturing Company and launched the Tommy Gate brand.

== Expansion ==
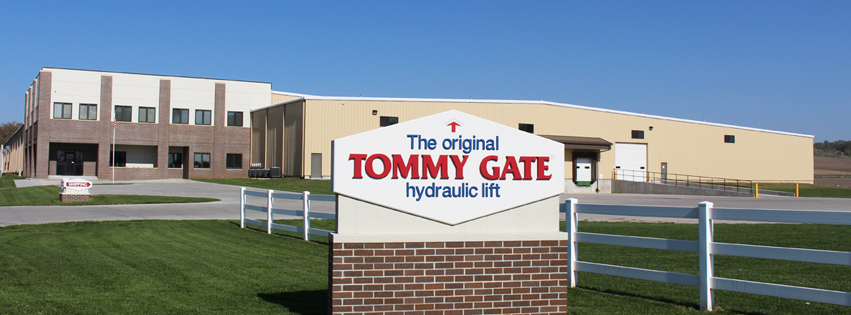
The Tommy Gate factory circa 2014.

The Woodbine manufacturing facility was initially built in 1965 to occupy 70,000 square feet of production space. It expanded in 1980 to 90,000 square feet and once again in 2000 when it grew to 140,000 square feet. The most recent expansion, completed in 2011, grew the plant to an overall 200,000 square feet (including 40,000 square feet of warehouse space).
