= Iveco Vision =

Iveco concept vehicle

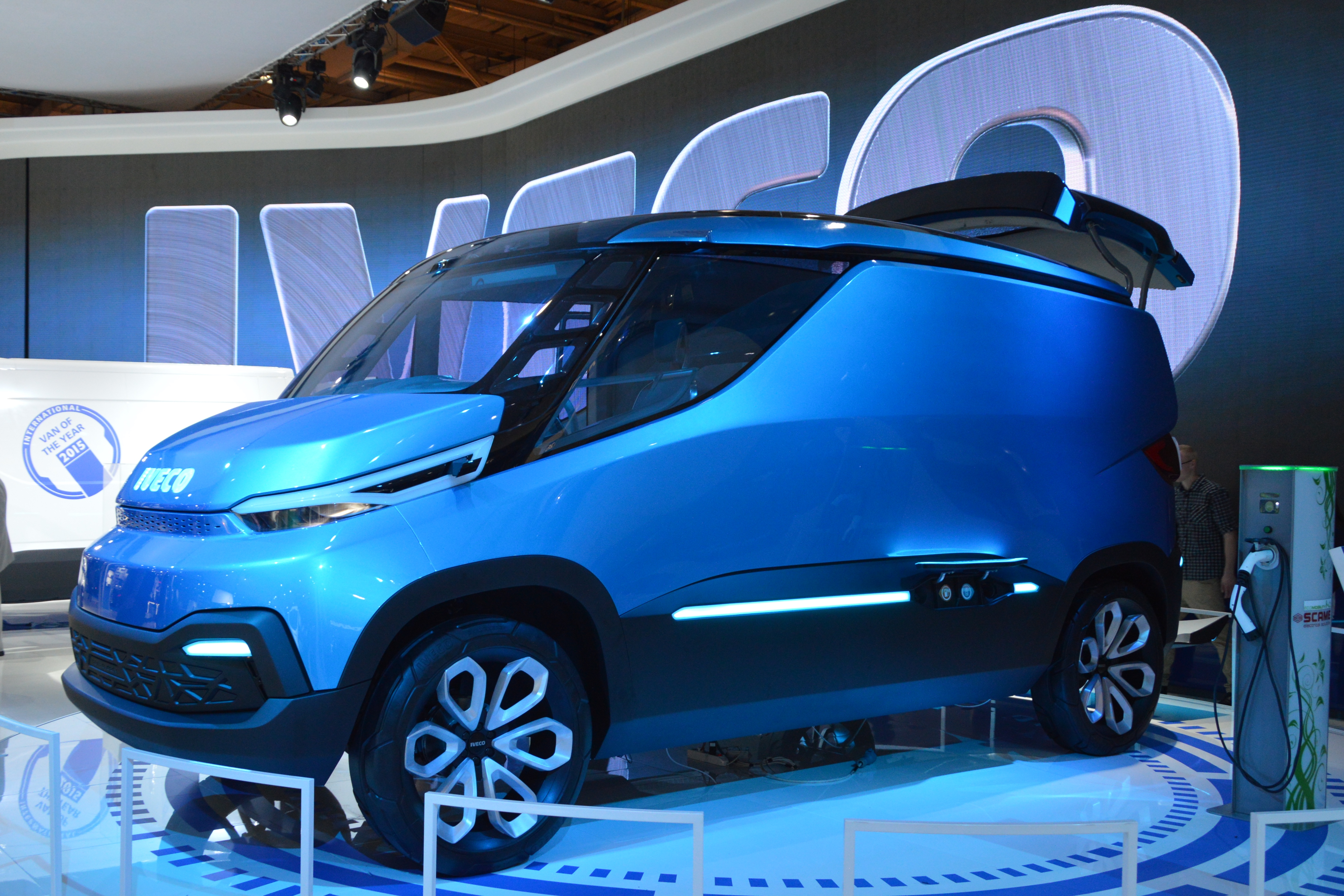
- 2014 Iveco Vision at the 2014 International Mobility Show Germany

Overview
- Manufacturer: Iveco
- Production: 2014

Body and chassis
- Class: Leisure activity vehicle (M)
- Body style: 2-door panel van

The Iveco Vision is an plug-in hybrid compact panel van concept revealed by Italian commercial vehicle manufacturer Iveco at the 2014 International Mobility Show Germany.

== Overview ==
The Iveco Vision concept was revealed at International Mobility Show Germany on September 24, 2014 in Hanover, Germany. It is a 2-door (single sliding door on passenger side, one liftgate in the back) plug-in hybrid compact panel van designed to be an eco-friendly door-to-door delivery van.

In December 2015, the concept won the 2016 Europäischer Transportpreis für Nachhaltigkeit (European Transport Award for Sustainability).

== Specifications ==
=== Technical specs ===
The Iveco Vision concept is powered by a hybrid engine and an electric motor.

=== Features ===
The Vision features a fully-automatic load management system, which uses sensors to identify objects and indicate where they should be placed inside the van. When an item is in its location, the system triggers a containment mechanism to hold it in place to prevent damage during delivery and improve space inside the vehicle.

=== Design ===
The van is finished in an electric blue paint and has plastic cladding on the side and bumpers. Also featured are LED headlights as well as other LED lights throughout the vehicle, see-through A pillars to eliminate blind spots, a glass roof, and a retractable step in the rear for easier cargo access.
