= USS Aeolus =

USS Aeolus or USNS Aeolus has been the name of more than one United States Navy ship, and may refer to:

- USS Aeolus (SP-186), the proposed name and designation of a motorboat inspected for possible service as a World War I patrol boat but never acquired by the Navy
- USS Aeolus (ID-3005), originally the German passenger ship SS Grosser Kurfürst, seized by the United States during World War I and in commission as a troop transport from 1917 to 1919
- USS Aeolus (ARL-42), an assigned name for the proposed, but later cancelled, conversion of tank landing ship USS LST-310 into a landing craft repair ship
- USS Aeolus (ARC-3), a cable repair ship in commission from 1955 to 1973, then in non-commissioned service with the Military Sealift Command as USNS Aeolus (T-ARC-3) from 1973 to 1985
