= Bown Manufacturing Company =

Bown
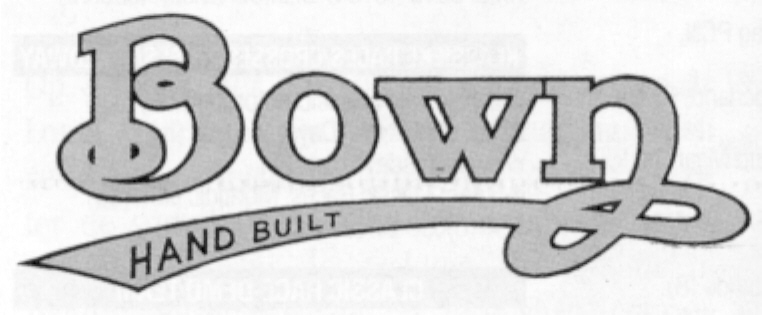
- Industry: Motorcycle, Bicycle
- Founder: William Bown, 1862
- Defunct: 1930s
- Headquarters: Birmingham, UK
- Area served: UK & Ireland
- Key people: William Bown, William A.R. Bown
- Products: Aeolus ball bearings, cycle-parts, Bicycles, Motorcycles
- Number of employees: 1,000 (1892)

The Bown Manufacturing Company was established in 1862 in Birmingham by local machinist, William Bown, making a variety of patented mechanical parts. The name Aeolus had been used as a trademark since 1877 and especially for cycle parts. A second-cousin took over the company when the founder died in 1900 and began making powered-cycles also under the Aeolus brand. Production was interrupted by the First World War, after which motorcycles were marketed under the Bown brand until 1924. The company was subsequently acquired by the Aberdale Cycle Company in the 1930s.

== History ==
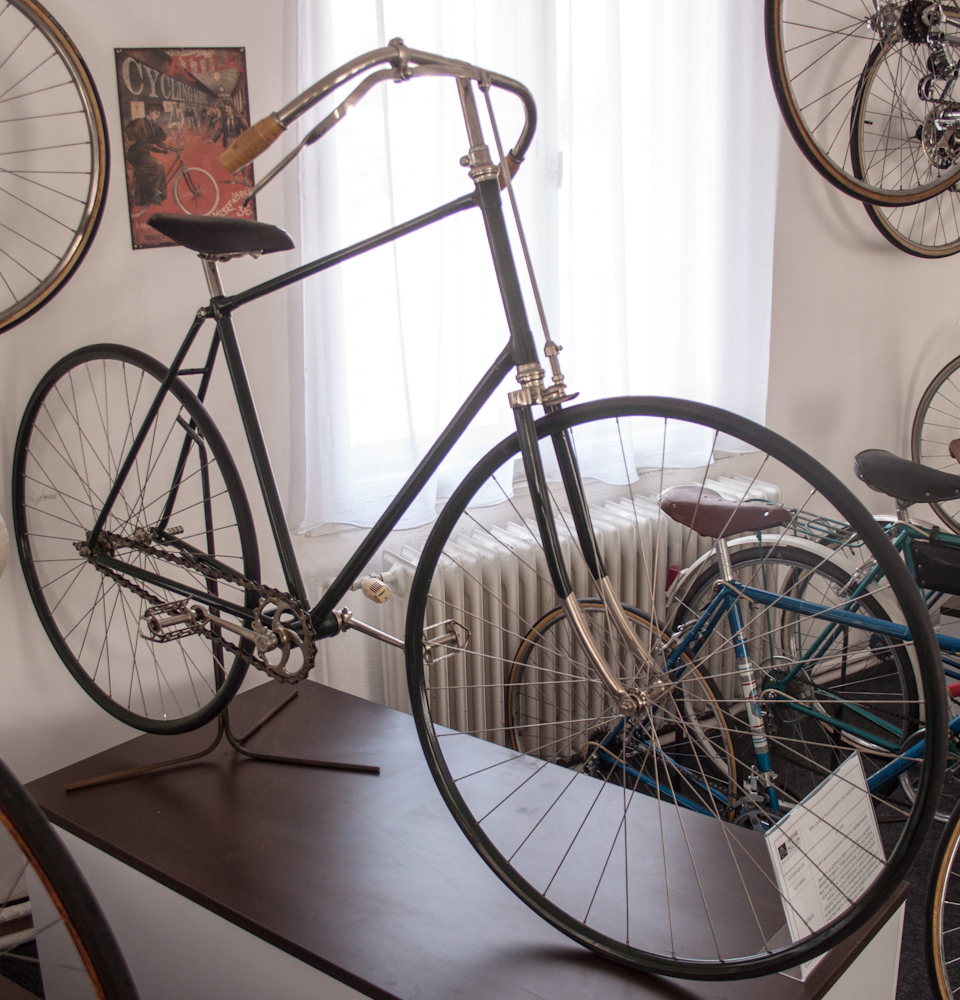
Aeolus bicycle, 1892-95

The company was formed in 1862 by William Bown. At first, the company manufactured a variety of articles: parts for sewing machines, horse clippers, roller skate wheels and the likes. Many of these devices were the subject of patents filed by William Bown and sometimes one or more of his colleagues. On several occasions, the company resorted to the courts to try and protect these patents; not always successfully.

One particular development was the creation of a ball race bearing utilising ball-bearings and applied to bicycle pedals and wheel hubs. The idea was patented and became a key product for the company acquiring the trade-mark Æolus referencing the Greek god of the winds Aeolus. By 1892 the company had over 1,000 employees in several workshops. Approaching his retirement, William converted the business to a limited company in 1893. With the success of Aeolus ball bearings, production was increasingly focused on bicycle parts and by 1896 the company was clearly identified as a bicycle manufacturer being listed as such in a local business directory.

After the death of William in 1900, a second-cousin, William A.R. Bown, took over the company and in 1903 took the next step in bicycle manufacture by adding an engine to produce the first Aeolus motorcycle. This early machine is renowned for having a shaft drive, possibly the first British motorcycle to do so. However, the machines were only made in very small numbers and production ceased in 1905.

Still based in Birmingham at the Aeolus Works, Summer Lane motorcycle production restarted in 1914, again under the Aeolus marque, using a small Villiers engine. While the war interrupted production, when it resumed in 1919, the motorcycles were now marketed under Bown's own name as the Bownian or the Bown Villiers for larger machines.

In 1924 the factory relocated to Chadwell Heath, Essex and production changed back from motorcycles to unpowered bicycles.

Midway through the thirties the company was acquired by Aberdale though William A.R. Bown retained a seat on the board in a technical capacity. The Bown name continued to be used by Aberdale and several motorcycles were produced under this marque into the 1950s .

== Patent activities ==
William Bown was an enthusiastic experimenter with a keen eye for marketable ideas. He was known to have registered over 14 patents, with a notable example being his patent for the famous Aeolus ball bearing. Amongst other products, the company was able to earn substantial royalties in addition to sales from their own manufactured products. The company's promotional material clearly referenced these unique selling points, and illustrated the range of technical innovations introduced by the company.

- 1870 patent 2781 for the invention of "an improved arrangement of feed regulator for sewing machines"
- 1874 patent 715 invention of "improvements in horse clippers"
- 1876 patent 3266 for the invention of "improvements in the construction of wheels or rollers for roller skates and for other purposes"
- 1876 patent 3817 in respect of the invention of "improvements in sewing machine shuttles
- 1877 patent 3531 granted 19 September 1877 as "bearings for velocipedes, carriages and other purposes". Including the first ball-race-pedal and wheel-bearings based on their development of the "AEolus ball bearing". These were to become key products for the company accordingly bearing the trade-mark Aeolus name. The invention was actually made by John Henry Hughes, then a 27-year old toolmaker in Birmingham. Bown persuaded Hughes to sell the rights to the patent and to work for him. Hughes continued to collaborate with Bown in future patent applications
- 1878 patent 653 for the invention of "certain improvements in apparatus for clipping or shearing horses and other animals"
- 1878 patent 1274 for the invention of " certain improvements in springs for gloves and other purposes, and in the means used for securing springs to gloves or other articles"
- 1878 patent 3303 for the invention of "certain improvements in attachments and accessories for sewing-machines, parts of which are applicable for other useful purposes."
- 1879 patent for "improvements to bicycles, tricycles and other velocipedes"
- 1880 patent for "improvements in tricycles and parts of bicycles"
- 1883 an expensive and protracted court case challenging Humber, Marriot and Cooper cycle manufactures and others on breach of the 1877 patent; Humber eventually became licensees.
- 1890 challenge Centaur Cycle Co on breach of 1877 patent
- 1891 patent for "elastic tires and rims for the wheels of bicycles, tricycles, and other velocipedes and carriages"
- 1891 challenge Hart Cycle Co on breach of patent
- 1891 patent for "velocipede and other lamps"
- 1892 patent for "lamps for bicycles, tricycles, and other velocipedes or carriages"
- 1894 patent for velocipedes

It has been suggested that as the 1877 patent expired (after 20 years), the ball-race-pedal became standard equipment used by most or all bicycle manufacturers, possibly even in current machines.

== Motorcycles ==
1903 Aeolus
- Manufacturer: Bown
- Engine: 492cc single-cylinder engine
- Transmission: shaft-drive

1914-1924 Bownian
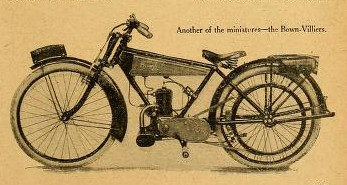
- contemporaneous engraving or sketch of the Bownian accompanying report of the 1922 Olympia Show
- Manufacturer: Bown
- Engine: 147cc Villiers 2-stroke

1919-1923 Bown Villiers
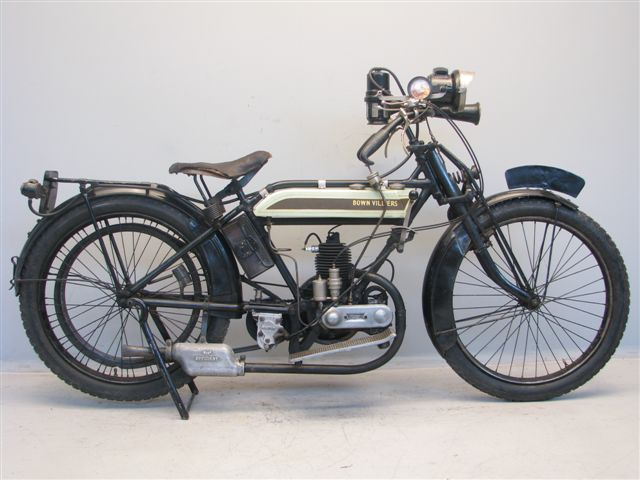
- Manufacturer: Bown
- Engine: 269cc Villiers 2-stroke 1919-1923 293cc J.A.P. 4-stroke 1919-1921 348cc Blackburne 4-stroke 1919-1921
- Transmission: 2 gears, chain-cum-belt
- Brakes: rim option: internal expanding Brampton

As well as manufacturing their own range of motorcycles, the company also offered equipment for other makes of bike: motorcycle hubs, rim brakes, ball-bearing clutches and the likes.

1903-1905
had a 492cc single-cylinder engine with shaft drive to the rear wheel. Production was on a limited scale

1914-1916
Aeolus small 147cc Villiers powered motorcycles
1919-1924
the Aelous rebranded as the Bownian.

1919-1921
JAP powered 248cc motorcycle and a 348cc Blackburne powered machine, not mentioned after 1921

1919 - 1923
Branded as the Bown Villiers, extant versions of a Villiers 269cc touring model still survive The machine was equipped with a two-speed gearbox, drip-feed lubrication and a Bosch magneto. It had aluminium footboards, Saxon forks and Miller lighting set. The exhaust included an aluminium damper box.

A contemporary review from the 1922 show at Olympia, London reported:

Several alternatives are offered by the makers of the Bown motorcycles, Blackburne, J.A.P. and Villiers-engined models being shown upon the stand. The general specification apart from the engine is similar in each case. These machines are laid down and constructed on lines that are sound, solid, and practical, and ample provision is made for silencing, the exhaust pipes taken right out to the back of the machine. Internal expanding Brampton front wheel brakes may be fitted as an alternative to the ordinary rim brake, and the Brampton fork with centrally placed tension spring has been standardised. Adjustment is provided for the front driving chain to the gear box.

— The Motor Cycle, Nov 1922
