= Aberdale =

Historical motorcycle manufacturer

Aberdale Cycle Co. Ltd.
- Industry: Manufacturing & engineering
- Founded: 1919
- Founder: Levy
- Defunct: 1958
- Successor: British Cycle Corporation & Trusty
- Headquarters: London, UK
- Area served: UK & Ireland
- Key people: Joseph Levy, Leslie Levy, William A.R. Bown
- Products: Bicycles, Motorcycles

The Aberdale Cycle Company was founded in 1919. The company concentrated on high volume, popular bicycles. In the mid-1930s, the company moved to a modern factory in London; they also acquired the Bown Manufacturing Company around the same time. Bown brought experience of building motorcycles and with rising demand for motorised transport after 1945, the company began producing mopeds and light-weight motorcycles at their London plant and in Wales. In 1958, Aberdale were acquired by the British Cycle Corporation, while the Aberdale management went on to found Trusty Manufacturing Co Ltd.

== History ==
Aberdale Cycle Company was founded in 1919 by the father of Joseph and Leslie Levy. Joseph joined the company when he was 14; within a few years, he was selling the company's bicycles from a wheelbarrow. Joe progressed to become sales manager when he was only 23.

Evidently the company was thriving; in 1934, it moved to a newly constructed Bridport Works at Edmonton, London. Around this time, the company acquired another bicycle manufacturer, Bown Manufacturing Company. Aberde appointed the owner, William A.R. Bown, to the board. Bown's personal expertise was in engineering and it seems the Levy brothers preferred to focus their energies on the commercial aspects of the business. By 1936, the company boasted a range of 50 bicycles at the Olympia Show. The Bown name was already established as a marque of quality and bicycles such as the Bown Xtralite were produced in 1937. In 1941, Joe was appointed managing director.

During World War II, commercial production ceased as the company committed itself to the production of war materials including small generating sets for use in aeroplanes.

After the war, the demand for economic, personal, motorised transport blossomed. Using Bown's technical expertise in motorcycle manufacture, the company launched the Aberdale Autocycle in March 1947. The autocycle was powered by a 98cc Villiers Junior de Luxe engine. It was a typical machine of the period but included a custom toolkit and a Smiths speedometer. These modifications placing it in the higher end of the market, certainly compared to their usual high-volume products. One special machine was created, painted with Post Office livery of bright red in an attempt to gain a contract from the Royal Mail; it looked so good, a limited edition was offered as an alternative to the traditional black with gold piping. Joseph Levy also toured North America promoting both the autocycle and the company's Gresham Flyer child's tricycle. Less than 2,000 autocycles were eventually produced overall by 1948.

Late in 1948, Villiers announced the introduction of their 2F engine; Aberdale, like most of their rival manufacturers such as Francis Barnett, began to redesign their cycle to accommodate the new engine showing a prototype at the Earls Court Show in November 1948. However, the new machine never materialised. In 1949 the company was provided with a factory in Llwynypia, Wales under the government's Advanced Factories Scheme. W.A.R.Bown was charged with developing the new production facility consequently delaying the immediate development of the 2F machine. It took until 1950 before a 2F-powered machine came to market as the Bown Auto-roadster again exploiting the Bown marque with the epithets Hand Built and Since 1860. William Bown continued to develop motorcycles for the company releasing the Bown 1F in 1951. Some 3,000 of autocycles were produced.

In 1952, a Villiers powered 122cc motorcycle was introduced. It too was marketed under the Bown marque and also built at the factory in Wales. It was raced at the Isle of Man TT permitting it to be legitimately marketed as the Bown "Tourist Trophy". Only 200 machines are believed to have been built.

In 1954, sales plummeted for Aberdale, along with other autocycle manufacturers, as the market for autocycles collapsed. High production costs of their motorised products added to the company's difficulties and in the winter of 1954/55 the factory in Wales closed. By this time, the company's product licences were being progressively transferred to the British Cycle Corporation.

The company limped on, assembling a German manufactured moped. In 1955, the Bown marque made its final appearance at the Earls Court Show with a Bown-branded Zweirad Union moped powered by a Sachs 49cc engine called the Bown "50". The machines were manufactured in Germany and assembled at the Edmonton plant although minor modifications may have been added in London. The last moped left the factory in 1958, although they continued to appear in sales lists until all stocks were cleared in 1959.

The company formally closed in early 1959 as the Edmonton plant shut and remaining assets were transferred to the British Cycle Corporation in Handsworth, Birmingham. Aberdale remained a subsidiary of Raleigh until 1976.

The Levy brothers, William A.R. Bown, and former colleagues from Aberdale went on to form Trusty Manufacturing Co. Ltd to manufacture scooters & cycles for children.

== Motorcycles ==
1947 Aberdale autocycle
- Manufacturer: Aberdale
- Successor: Bown Auto-Roadster
- Engine: Villiers Junior de Luxe
- Top speed: 34 mph
- Fuel capacity: 1.5 gallons
- Fuel consumption: 150 mpg_{‑imp} (1.9 L/100 km; 120 mpg_{‑US})

1949 Bown Auto-Roadster
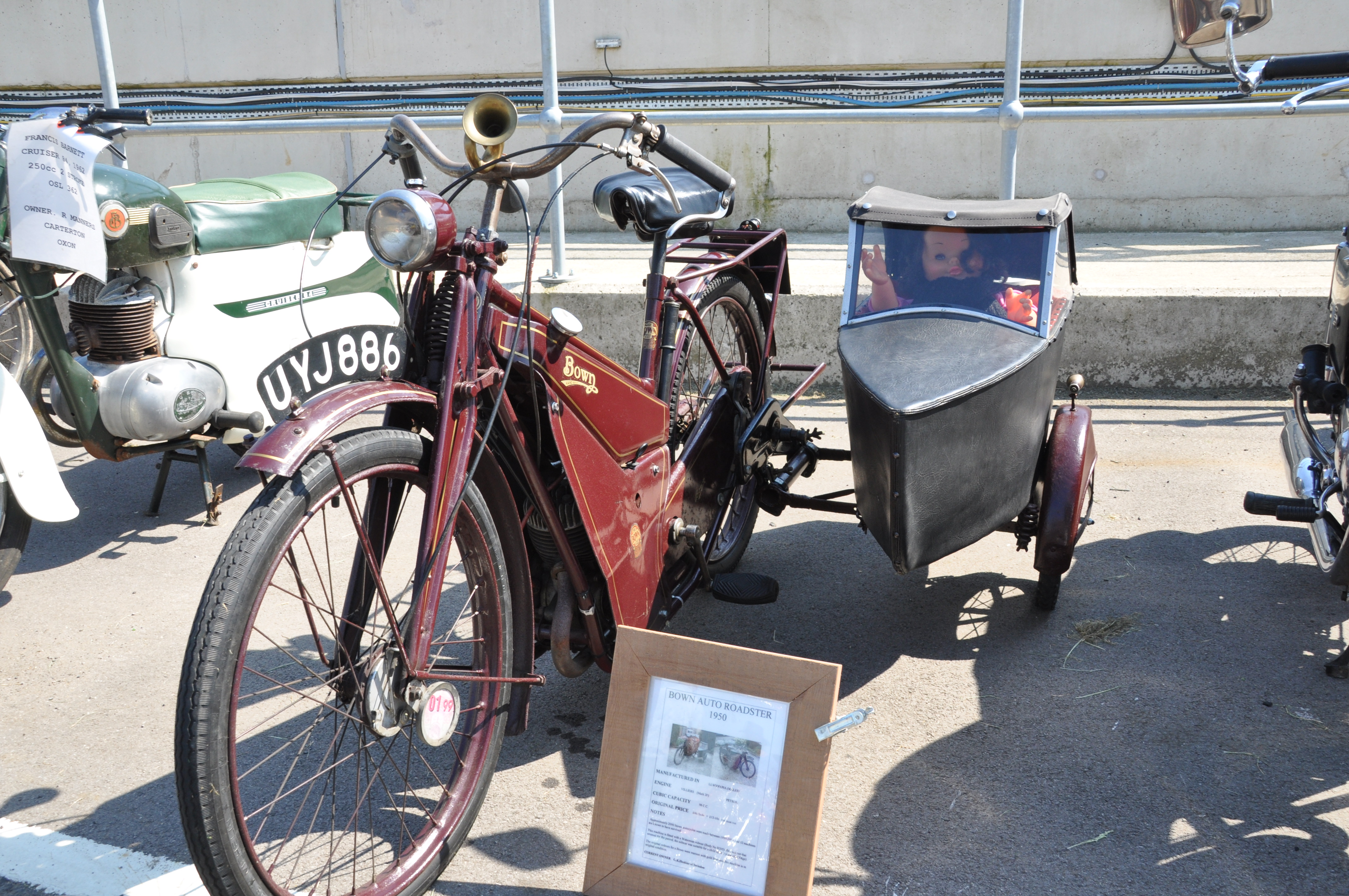
- Manufacturer: Aberdale
- Predecessor: Aberdale autocycle
- Engine: 99cc Villiers 2F
- Compression ratio: 8:1
- Top speed: 43+mph
- Brakes: 4-inch hub, front & rear

1951 Bown 1F
- Manufacturer: Aberdale
- Predecessor: Aberdale autocycle
- Engine: 98cc Villiers 1F & 4F (1952)

1952 Bown 'Tourist Trophy'
- Manufacturer: Aberdale
- Engine: 122cc Villiers 10D single, 2-stroke
- Top speed: 45 m.p.h.
- Transmission: 3 speed
- Suspension: metal profiles, undamped telescopic forks
- Tires: 3.00 x 19in
- Wheelbase: 46in
- Seat height: 29in
- Weight: 172lb (wet)
- Fuel capacity: 2.5g
- Fuel consumption: 176 mpg_{‑imp} (1.61 L/100 km; 147 mpg_{‑US}) @ 20mph, 128 mpg_{‑imp} (2.21 L/100 km; 107 mpg_{‑US}) @ 30mph, 80 mpg_{‑imp} (3.5 L/100 km; 67 mpg_{‑US}) @ 40mph

1956-57 Bown "50"
- Manufacturer: Aberdale
- Class: moped
- Engine: 47cc Sachs

Aberdale built autocycles and lightweight motorcycles between 1946 and 1959. Engines used were 98cc and 123cc Villiers units and Sachs two-stroke engines.

- 1947 Aberdale autocycle
- 1949 Bown auto-roadster
- 1951 Bown 1F
- 1952 Bown "Tourist Trophy"
- 1955 Bown "50"
