= USS LST-371 =

Tank landing ship in the United States Navy

History

United States
- Name: USS LST-371
- Builder: Bethlehem Steel Co., Quincy, Massachusetts
- Laid down: 29 October 1942
- Launched: 12 December 1942
- Commissioned: 16 January 1943
- Decommissioned: 16 March 1946
- Out of service: Transferred to the Royal Navy on 17 November 1944; Returned on 26 February 1946
- Fate: Sold to Bosey, Philippines, on 5 December 1947

General characteristics
- Class & type: LST-1-class tank landing ship
- Displacement: 1,625 tons standard, 4,080 tons full load
- Length: 328 ft (99.97 m)
- Beam: 50 ft (15.24 m)
- Draught: Bow 2'-4", stern 7'-6" (unloaded); bow 8'-2", stern 14'-1" (unloaded)
- Depth: 8' fwd; 14'-4" aft (full load)
- Propulsion: Two General Motors 12-567 diesel engines, two shafts, twin rudders
- Speed: 12 knots (22 km/h)
- Range: 24,000 miles at 9 knots (17 km/h)
- Boats & landing craft carried: Two LCVPs
- Troops: 163
- Complement: 111
- Armament: 2 × twin 40 mm guns; 4 × single 40 mm guns; 12 × single 20 mm guns

USS LST-371 was a LST-1-class tank landing ship used by the United States Navy.

She was laid down at Bethlehem Steel Co., Quincy, Massachusetts, on 29 October 1942 and launched on 12 December 1942. The ship and crew went from Quincy to New York City, New York for final outfitting. On 1 May 1943 they left New York for Tunis, Tunisia, on the North African coast, arriving there on 27 May 1943. While in North Africa LST-371 was based at La Goulette Bay.

== Wartime career ==
LST-371 participated in Operation Husky, the invasion of Sicily, on 10 July 1943, landing troops of the First Division at Gela. During Operation Avalanche, the ship arrived at Salerno on 9 September 1943 and landed British troops early on the morning of 10 September 1943.

On 22 November 1943, LST-371 departed Oran, Algeria loaded with a LCT to convoy from Gibraltar to the British Isles. They arrived at Plymouth, England, on 5 December 1944. For the rest of the winter and spring they prepared for Operation Overlord, the invasion of Normandy, France.

The ship departed her home port of Dartmouth, England, on the night of 5 June 1944 and arrived at Normandy on 6 June 1944. They unloaded on Rhino Ferries and LCTs on 7 June 1944. During the next several months they made numerous trips between Normandy, Portland, and Southampton.

LST-371 was decommissioned from the U.S. Navy and transferred to the Royal Navy on 17 November 1944. On 16 March 1946 the ship was transferred back to the U.S. Navy and on 5 December 1947 she was sold to Bosey, Philippines. LST-371 earned three battle stars for World War II service
