= USS Cheboygan County =

American tank landing ship

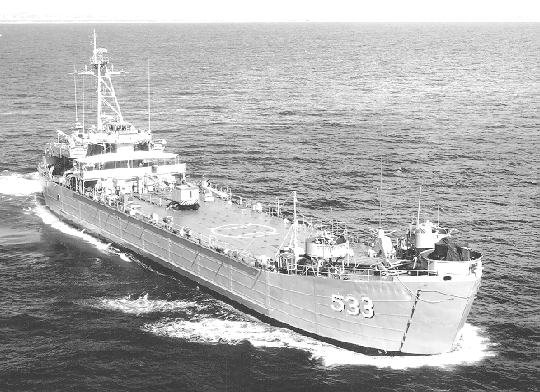
- LST-533

History

United States
- Name: USS LST-533
- Namesake: Cheboygan County, Michigan
- Builder: Missouri Valley Bridge and Iron Company, Evansville, Indiana
- Laid down: 29 September 1943
- Launched: 1 December 1943
- Commissioned: 27 January 1944
- Decommissioned: 1 December 1955
- Renamed: USS Cheboygan County (LST-533), 1 July 1955
- Recommissioned: 18 November 1961
- Decommissioned: May 1969
- Stricken: 15 September 1974
- Honours and awards: 1 battle star (World War II)
- Fate: Sold for scrapping, 1 December 1975

General characteristics
- Class & type: LST-491-class tank landing ship
- Displacement: 1,625 long tons (1,651 t) light; 4,080 long tons (4,145 t) full
- Length: 328 ft (100 m)
- Beam: 50 ft (15 m)
- Draft: Unloaded : 2 ft 4 in (0.71 m) forward; 7 ft 6 in (2.29 m) aft; Loaded : 8 ft 2 in (2.49 m) forward; 14 ft 1 in (4.29 m) aft
- Propulsion: 2 × General Motors 12-567 diesel engines, two shafts, twin rudders
- Speed: 12 knots (22 km/h; 14 mph)
- Boats & landing craft carried: 2 LCVPs
- Troops: 16 officers, 147 enlisted men
- Complement: 7 officers, 104 enlisted men
- Armament: 1 × single 3-inch/50-caliber gun mount; 4 × twin 40 mm guns; 12 × single 20 mm guns

USS Cheboygan County (LST-533) was an LST-491-class tank landing ship built for the United States Navy during World War II. Named for Cheboygan County, Michigan, she has so far been the only U.S. Naval vessel to bear the name. The name Cheboygan also means "Big Boat".

LST-533 was laid down on 29 September 1943 at Evansville, Indiana, by the Missouri Valley Bridge & Iron Company; launched on 1 December 1943; sponsored by Mrs. H. D. Peoples; and commissioned on 27 January 1944.

== Service history ==
During World War II, LST-533 was assigned to the European Theater. She participated in the Invasion of Normandy. LST-533 departed Trebah near Falmouth Cornwall, United Kingdom on 5 June 1944, transporting units of the 29th Infantry Division. Following the War, LST-533 performed occupation duty in Europe until early February 1953. She was named USS Cheboygan County (LST-533) on 1 July 1955. The ship was decommissioned on 1 December 1955, recommissioned on 18 November 1961, and performed duties for the Service Force, U.S. Atlantic Fleet. The tank landing ship was again decommissioned in May 1969, and struck from the Naval Vessel Register on 15 September 1974. The ship was sold for scrapping 1 December 1975 by the Defense Reutilization and Marketing Service (DRMS).

LST-533 earned one battle star for World War II service.

== See also ==
- List of United States Navy LSTs

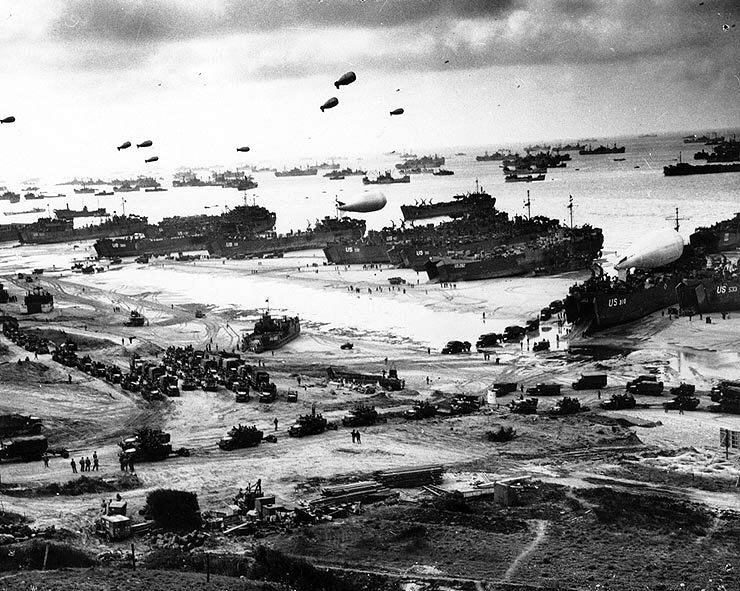
LST-310 (2nd LST from the right) along with other ships putting cargo ashore on one of the invasion beaches, at low tide during the first days of the Invasion of Normandy in June 1944. Among identifiable ships present are Chase County (LST-532) (in the center of the view); LST-262 (3rd LST from right); LST-533 (partially visible at far right); and LST-524. Note the barrage balloons overhead and Army "half-track" convoy forming up on the beach.
