= USS Chase County =

American tank landing ship

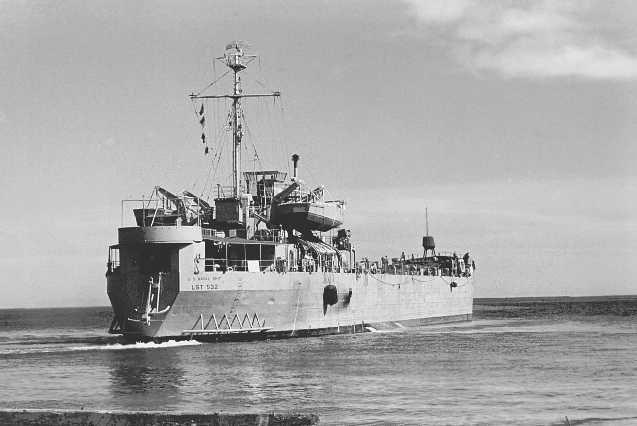
- USNS Chase County (T-LST-532) underway in Saipan Lagoon, Pacific Trust Territories, 1971

History

United States
- Name: USS LST-532, later USS Chase County
- Namesake: Chase County, Kansas, and Chase County, Nebraska
- Builder: Missouri Valley Bridge & Iron Company, Evansville, Indiana
- Laid down: 24 September 1943
- Launched: 28 November 1943
- Commissioned: 20 January 1944
- Decommissioned: 8 June 1955
- In service: 15 April 1967
- Out of service: 10 June 1973
- Renamed: USS Chase County (LST-532), 1 July 1955
- Reclassified: USNS Chase County (T-LST-532), 15 April 1967
- Stricken: 10 June 1973
- Identification: IMO number: 8327246
- Honours and awards: 1 battle star (World War II)
- Fate: Transferred to Singapore, 1973

Singapore
- Acquired: 1973
- Fate: Unknown

General characteristics
- Class & type: LST-491-class tank landing ship
- Displacement: 1,780 long tons (1,809 t) light; 3,640 long tons (3,698 t) full
- Length: 328 ft (100 m)
- Beam: 50 ft (15 m)
- Draft: Unloaded : 2 ft 4 in (0.71 m) forward; 7 ft 6 in (2.29 m) aft; Loaded : 8 ft 2 in (2.49 m) forward; 14 ft 1 in (4.29 m) aft
- Propulsion: 2 × General Motors 12-567 diesel engines, two shafts, twin rudders
- Speed: 12 knots (22 km/h; 14 mph)
- Boats & landing craft carried: 2 LCVPs
- Troops: Approximately 140 officers and enlisted men
- Complement: 16 officers, 147 enlisted men
- Armament: 2 × twin 40 mm gun mounts w/Mk.51 directors; 4 × single 40 mm gun mounts; 12 × single 20 mm gun mounts

USS Chase County (LST-532) was an LST-491-class tank landing ship built for the United States Navy during World War II. Named after counties in Kansas and Nebraska, she was the only U.S. Naval vessel to bear the name.

LST-532 was laid down on 24 September 1943 at Evansville, Indiana, by the Missouri Valley Bridge & Iron Company; launched on 28 November 1943; sponsored by Mrs. Fred M. Wyatt; and commissioned on 20 January 1944.

== Service history ==
During World War II, LST-532 was assigned to the European Theater and participated in the Invasion of Normandy in June 1944. She loaded troops and equipment including vehicles at Trebah Beach (called Polgwidden in US sources), Helford River, near Falmouth, Cornwall, on 1 June 1944. This location was the most westerly embarkation site for this operation and the distance that they had to travel to rendezvous with the rest of the Operation Neptune fleet meant that these personnel then spent the next 5 days aboard this flat bottomed vessel in the terrible weather conditions that delayed the Overlord landings until 6 June.

Footage taken by a US Army Film Unit on 1 June 1944 shows her together with LSTs 533 and 27 loading at Trebah.

Following the War, she operated with the Service Force, U.S. Atlantic Fleet. The ship was decommissioned on 8 June 1955 and renamed USS Chase County (LST-532) on 1 July 1955.

On 15 April 1967 she was transferred to the Military Sea Transportation Service (MSTS) and served as USNS Chase County (T-LST-532) until struck from the Naval Vessel Register on 10 June 1973. Transferred to the Republic of Singapore in 1973, she was later sold into commercial service as MS Constructors. Her final fate is unknown.

LST-532 earned one battle star for World War II service.

== See also ==
- Chase County, Kansas
- Chase County, Nebraska

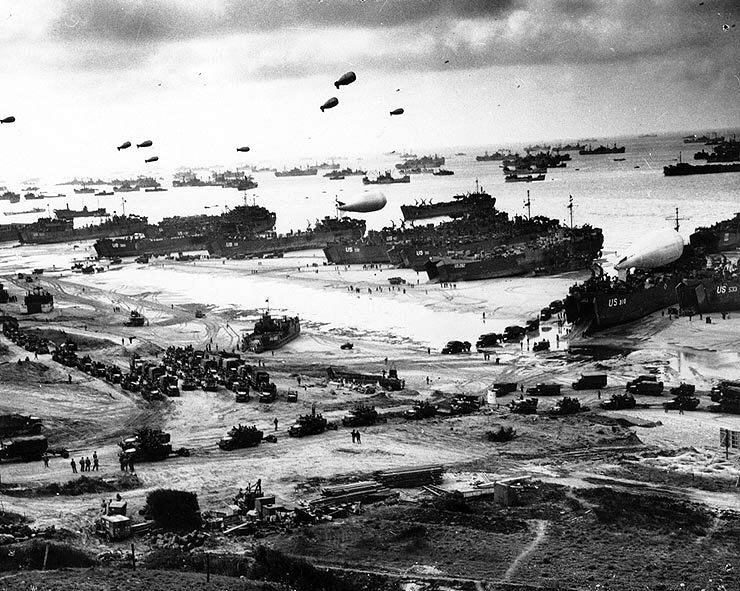
LST-310 (2nd LST from the right) along with other ships putting cargo ashore on one of the invasion beaches, at low tide during the first days of the Invasion of Normandy in June 1944. Among identifiable ships present are LST-532 (in the center of the view); LST-262 (3rd LST from right); LST-533 (partially visible at far right); and LST-524. Note the barrage balloons overhead and Army "half-track" convoy forming up on the beach.
