= USS LST-5 =

1942 LST-1-class tank landing ship

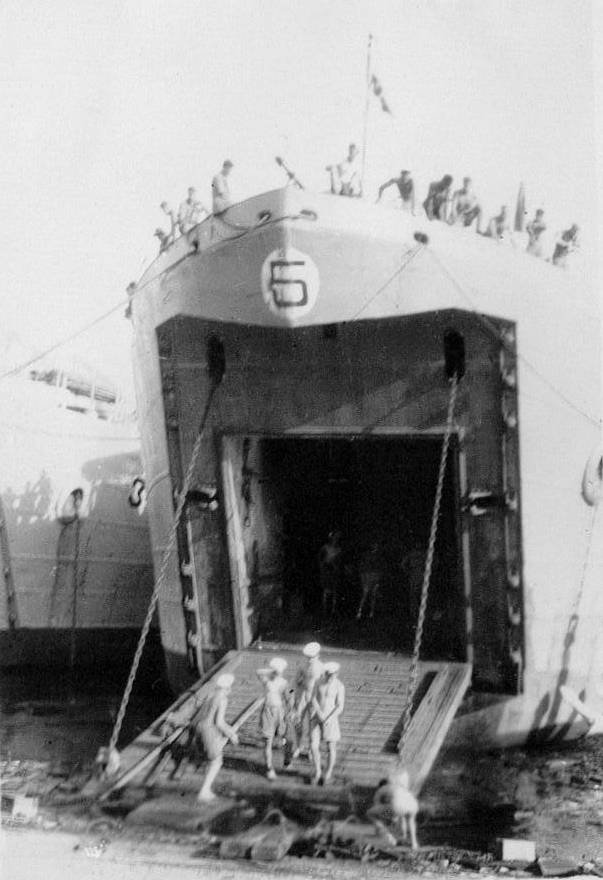
- HM LST-5 beached at Madras, India, while loading in preparation for the voyage to Batavia, Java, Dutch East Indies, 2 January 1946. Note that the bow doors have been removed.

History

United States
- Name: LST-5
- Builder: Dravo Corporation, Pittsburgh, Pennsylvania
- Laid down: 12 July 1942
- Launched: 3 October 1942
- Sponsored by: Mrs. John (Jennie) Bartolo
- Commissioned: 22 February 1943
- Decommissioned: 17 November 1944
- Identification: Hull symbol: LST-5; Code letters: NDNP
- Honors and awards: 3 × battle stars
- Fate: Transferred to the Royal Navy

United Kingdom
- Name: LST-5
- Commissioned: 18 November 1944
- Decommissioned: 19 February 1946
- Fate: Sold for scrapping, 7 October 1947

General characteristics
- Type: LST-1-class tank landing ship
- Displacement: 4,080 long tons (4,145 t) full load; 2,160 long tons (2,190 t) landing
- Length: 328 ft (100 m) oa
- Beam: 50 ft (15 m)
- Draft: Full load: 8 ft 2 in (2.49 m) forward; 14 ft 1 in (4.29 m) aft; Landing at 2,160 t: 3 ft 11 in (1.19 m) forward; 9 ft 10 in (3.00 m) aft
- Installed power: 2 × 900 hp (670 kW) Electro-Motive Diesel 12-567A diesel engines; 1,700 shp (1,300 kW)
- Propulsion: 1 × Falk main reduction gears; 2 × Propellers
- Speed: 12 kn (22 km/h; 14 mph)
- Range: 24,000 nmi (44,000 km; 28,000 mi) at 9 kn (17 km/h; 10 mph) while displacing 3,960 long tons (4,024 t)
- Boats & landing craft carried: 2 or 6 x LCVPs
- Capacity: 2,100 tons oceangoing maximum; 350 tons main deckload
- Troops: 163
- Complement: 117
- Armament: Varied, ultimate armament; 2 × twin 40 mm (1.57 in) Bofors guns; 4 × single 40 mm Bofors guns; 12 × 20 mm (0.79 in) Oerlikon cannons

Service record
- Operations: Sicilian occupation (July 1943); Salerno landings (September 1943); Invasion of Normandy (June 1944)

USS LST-5 was an LST-1-class tank landing ship of the United States Navy built during World War II. She was transferred to the Royal Navy in November 1944.

Like many of her class, she was not named and is properly referred to by her hull designation.

== Construction ==
LST-5 was laid down on July 12, 1942, at Pittsburgh, Pennsylvania by the Dravo Corporation. Launched on October 3, 1942, she was sponsored by Mrs. Wanetta Rose Barker and was commissioned on February 22, 1943.

== USN service history ==
During LST-5's involvement in World War II, she served in the Mediterranean Theater and European Theater and participated in the following operations: the Allied invasion of Sicily in July 1943, the Salerno Landings in September 1943, and the Invasion of Normandy in June 1944.

== Royal Navy service ==
LST-5 was decommissioned from the USN on November 17, 1944, and commissioned into the Royal Navy the next day as HM LST-5. She was refit at Belfast, from January 22 to April 11, 1945, before sailing for service in the Far East the following summer. On February 19, 1946, she was decommissioned from the Royal Navy.

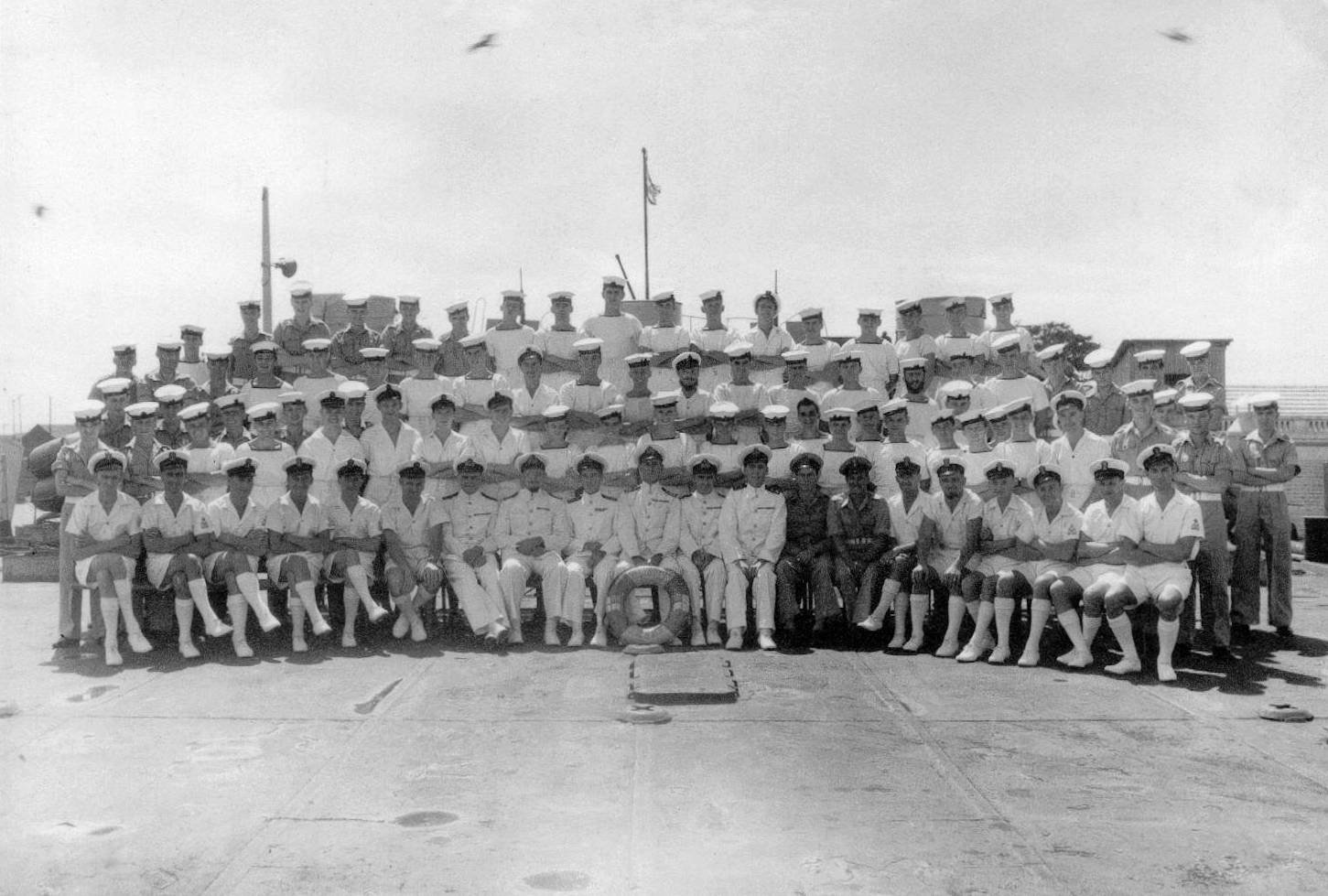
HM LST-5 Crew, Madras, 24 Nov 1945

== Final disposition ==
LST-5 was struck from the Navy list on August 1, 1947. On October 7, 1947, she was sold to the Tung Hwa Trading Co., Singapore, for scrapping.

== Bibliography ==
- "LST-5". Dictionary of American Naval Fighting Ships. Naval History and Heritage Command. This article incorporates text from this source, which is in the public domain.
- "LST-5". NavSource. 21 September 2007.
