= USS Armstrong County =

1943 LST-1-class tank landing ship

History

United States
- Name: USS LST-57
- Builder: Dravo Corporation, Pittsburgh, Pennsylvania
- Laid down: 24 October 1943
- Launched: 4 December 1943
- Commissioned: 15 January 1944
- Decommissioned: 24 January 1946
- Honors and awards: 1 battle star (WWII)
- Renamed: USS Armstrong County (LST-57), 1 July 1955
- Namesake: Armstrong County, Pennsylvania, Armstrong County, South Dakota, Armstrong County, Texas
- Stricken: 21 September 1955
- Fate: Sunk as a target, 1956

General characteristics
- Class & type: LST-1-class tank landing ship
- Displacement: 1,625 long tons (1,651 t) light; 4,080 long tons (4,145 t) full
- Length: 328 ft (100 m)
- Beam: 50 ft (15 m)
- Draft: Unloaded: Bow: 2 ft 4 in (0.71 m); Stern: 7 ft 6 in (2.29 m); Loaded : Bow: 8 ft 2 in (2.49 m); Stern: 14 ft 1 in (4.29 m)
- Depth: 8 ft (2.4 m) forward, 14 ft 4 in (4.37 m) aft (full load)
- Propulsion: 2 General Motors 12-567 diesel engines, two shafts, twin rudders
- Speed: 12 knots (22 km/h; 14 mph)
- Boats & landing craft carried: Two or six LCVPs
- Troops: 14–16 officers, 131–147 enlisted men
- Complement: 7–9 officers, 104–120 enlisted men
- Armament: 2 × twin 40 mm gun mounts w/Mk.51 directors; 4 × single 40 mm gun mounts; 12 × single 20 mm gun mounts

USS Armstrong County (LST-57) was an LST-1-class tank landing ship built for the United States Navy during World War II. Named for counties in Pennsylvania, South Dakota, and Texas, she was the only U.S. Naval vessel to bear the name.

LST-57 was laid down on 24 October 1943 at Neville Island, Pennsylvania by the Dravo Corporation and launched on 4 December 1943, sponsored by Mrs. Edward Mays. Placed in "reduced commission" on 1 January 1944 at her builder's yard, she went to New Orleans, Louisiana where she was commissioned on 15 January 1944.

== Service history ==
=== Voyage to England, February–May 1944 ===
Following her fitting out at Pensacola and shakedown training out of Panama City, Florida LST-57 returned to New Orleans where she took on board LCT-855 and a cargo of diesel fuel. Clearing the "Crescent City" on 25 February 1944 LST-57 proceeded independently to New York City. Spending five days there (during which time she embarked two Navy doctors and 40 corpsmen) the tank landing ship proceeded to Davisville, Rhode Island where the tank deck was loaded with 358 tons of pontoons: "no better a cargo for the sub-infested Atlantic," observed the ship's historian wryly. After an overnight stay at Boston, LST-57 joined a convoy bound for Halifax, Nova Scotia.

Reaching her destination on 21 March, the tank landing ship remained there until the 29th. Sailing thence with "slow convoy" SC 156, LST-57 began her voyage to the Old World, although for a time her crew wondered if they would ever get away from the New. Three events occurred before she even left Halifax harbor that presaged an "eventful" crossing. The wait for a frozen boat davit to thaw delayed recovery of one of the ship's landing craft, a tug ripped a hole in her port bow several feet above the waterline, and a steering casualty stopped her a few hundred feet from the antisubmarine nets causing the ship to-block the convoy sortie until it could be corrected. Once at sea, LST-57 and the convoy encountered dense fog that rendered visibility difficult for more than 48 hours, and another LST nearly collided with the ship. The fact that the other ship was known to be carrying ammunition "didn't quiet anyone's nerves," as LST-57s' chronicler, recounts. No sooner had the fog cleared but an ice field was encountered. Two emergency changes of course to avoid the ice caused the convoy "...to lose all semblance of order...for several hours."

Preoccupied by accidents and natural hazards, LST-57's crewmen almost forgot the war until U-302 rudely reminded them. At 02:28 on 6 April the U-boat torpedoed two merchantmen on LST-57's port side. The tank landing ship went to general quarters, but did not engage the enemy or participate in the rescue operation. One of the escorts, HMS Swale, sank U-302, and ships closer to the two victims picked up survivors. LST-57 reached Milford Haven, Wales, on 14 April, only to be directed to proceed to Southampton immediately. She overtook a slow coastal convoy to that port and reached her destination on the 16th, mooring at the Fawley oil dock, downstream from Southampton, to discharge the diesel oil cargo. Later, at Southampton the tank deck was unloaded and the LCT launched. Over the next few weeks, LST-57 visited Plymouth, Falmouth, Dartmouth, Salcombe, and Brixham as planning for the invasion of the continent of Europe proceeded apace. On 2 June, at Brixham, LST-57 took on board six tanks, several "Long Toms" (155-millimeter guns), and "...a handful of Army quartermasters and a reserve company of airborne infantry. It was a conglomeration," noted the tank landing ship's chronicler, "but the Army was careful in its loading and did not want to lose an LST full of one type of soldier."

=== Invasion of France, June–November 1944 ===
After bad weather forced the invasion force to postpone its scheduled departure on 4 June, LST-57 started toward France the following day as part of a slow convoy. LST-57 discharged her initial cargo and passengers at Utah Beach in the American sector of the Normandy Beachhead. Over the ensuing months, she visited all five of the Allied beaches: "Utah," "Omaha," "Juno," "Gold," and "Sword," delivering vital supplies and reinforcements from a variety of ports in southern England. After the Allied breakout at Saint-Lô late in July, the ship also carried supplies to the beach at Saint-Michel-en-Grève on the Brittany Peninsula. After November, LST-57 transported men and equipment from England to the French ports of Cherbourg, Rouen, and Le Havre and returned to England with Allied casualties and German prisoners of war.

=== Return to the US, April–July 1945 ===
On 16 April 1945 LST-57 stood out of Plymouth, England, on her way back to the United States. Steaming by way of Hampton Roads, Virginia, the tank landing ship reached Houston, Texas in mid-May. She carried out substantial repairs at the Brown Shipbuilding Company at Houston before proceeding to Gulfport, Mississippi to load cargo. Then, following a brief repair period at Mobile, Alabama, LST-57 set sail for the Panama Canal on 2 July. After transiting the canal, she departed the west coast of Panama on 13 July. The tank landing ship touched briefly at Manzanillo, Mexico before heading out across the Pacific Ocean.

=== Pacific Ocean, August–December 1945 ===
LST-57 arrived in Pearl Harbor on 2 August but resumed her voyage west on the 9th. While en route from Hawaii to the Marshall Islands, she received word of the Japanese capitulation. The tank landing ship arrived at Eniwetok on 21 August but tarried there only three days before getting underway on the 24th. She discharged cargo at Guam and then returned to sea on her way to the Philippines. In September and October, LST-57 visited Leyte and San Fernando in the Philippines before setting out for Japan to support the postwar occupation. In November and December, she made a circuitous voyage from Hiro Wan, Japan, to Saipan and Peleliu, returning to Tokyo on 27 December 1945.

=== 1946–1956 ===
Decommissioned on 24 January 1946, LST-57 was turned over to the Shipping Control Administrator, Japan (SCAJAP), for operation by a Japanese crew, under the designator Q-Q28. Returned to the Navy in November 1950, LST-57 was assigned to the Pacific Reserve Fleet at Tacoma, Washington on 9 November 1950 where she remained in reserve into the mid-1950s. Though named USS Armstrong County (LST-57) on 1 July 1955, she never performed any active service under that name. Her name was struck from the Naval Vessel Register on 21 September 1955 and she was sunk as a target the following year.

LST-57 was awarded one battle star for her World War II service.

== See also ==
- List of United States Navy LSTs
