= USS LST-521 =

1943 LST-491-class tank landing ship

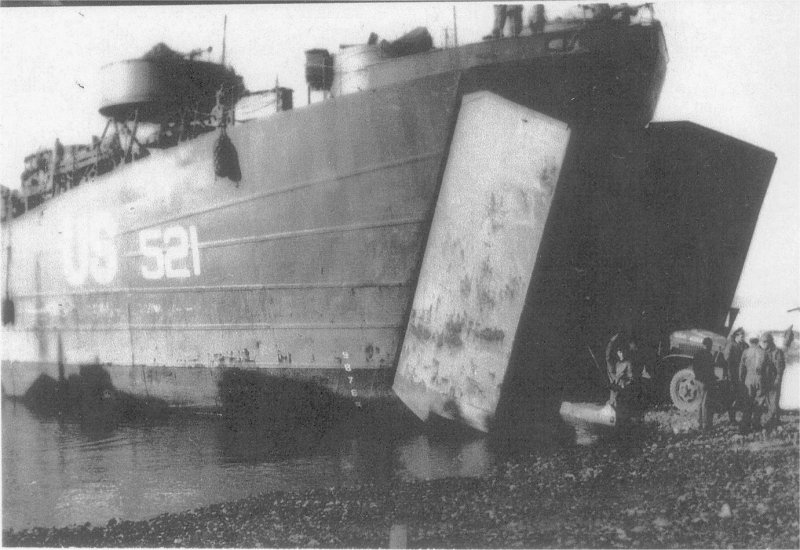
- USS LST-521

History

United States
- Name: USS LST-521
- Namesake: Cape May County
- Builder: Chicago Bridge & Iron Company, Seneca, Illinois
- Laid down: 4 October 1943
- Launched: 13 December 1943
- Commissioned: 3 January 1944
- Decommissioned: 21 October 1945
- Renamed: USS Cape May County (LST-521), 1 July 1955
- Stricken: 1 November 1959
- Honors and awards: 1 battle star (World War II)
- Fate: Stricken 1 November 1959

General characteristics
- Class & type: LST-491-class tank landing ship
- Displacement: 1,625 long tons (1,651 t) light; 3,640 long tons (3,698 t) full
- Length: 328 ft (100 m)
- Beam: 50 ft (15 m)
- Draft: Unloaded : 2 ft 4 in (0.71 m) forward; 7 ft 6 in (2.29 m) aft; Loaded : 8 ft 2 in (2.49 m) forward; 14 ft 1 in (4.29 m) aft
- Propulsion: 2 × General Motors 12-567 diesel engines, two shafts, twin rudders
- Speed: 12 knots (22 km/h; 14 mph)
- Boats & landing craft carried: Two LCVPs
- Troops: approx. 130 officers and enlisted
- Complement: 8–10 officers, 89–100 enlisted men
- Armament: 1 × single 3-inch/50-caliber gun mount; 8 × 40 mm gun; 12 × 20 mm guns

USS Cape May County (LST-521) was an LST-491-class tank landing ship built for the United States Navy during World War II. Named for Cape May County, New Jersey, she was the only U.S. Naval vessel to bear the name.

LST-521 was laid down on 4 October 1943 at Seneca, Illinois by the Chicago Bridge & Iron Company; launched on 13 December 1943; sponsored by Mrs. Ruth Sexton; and commissioned on 9 February 1944.

During World War II, USS LST-521 was assigned to the European Theater and participated in the Invasion of Normandy in June 1944. Upon her return to the United States, she was decommissioned on 21 October 1945.

Later reactivated (date unknown), assigned to the Military Sea Transportation Service (MSTS) and placed in service as USNS T-LST-521, the tank landing ship was placed out of service (date unknown) and redesignated USS Cape May County (LST-521) on 1 July 1955. The ship was struck from the Naval Vessel Register on 1 November 1959.

LST-521 earned one battle star for World War II service.

The ship was later sold privately and converted to a general cargo ship. It was named Cal-Argo (Honduran flag) in 1963, and Terry P in 1965. It was sold to the Indonesian government in 1966 and renamed Banten and later Teluk Banten.

== See also ==
- List of United States Navy LSTs

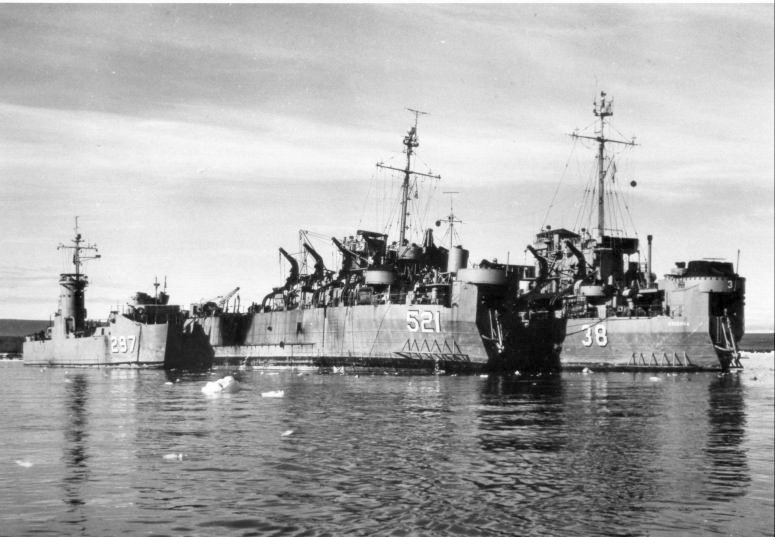
LST-521, LSM-297 and Krishna (ARL-38) during "Operation Blue Jay" (the construction of Thule Air Force Base in Greenland, c. 1950.
