= Tail lift =

Mechanical device

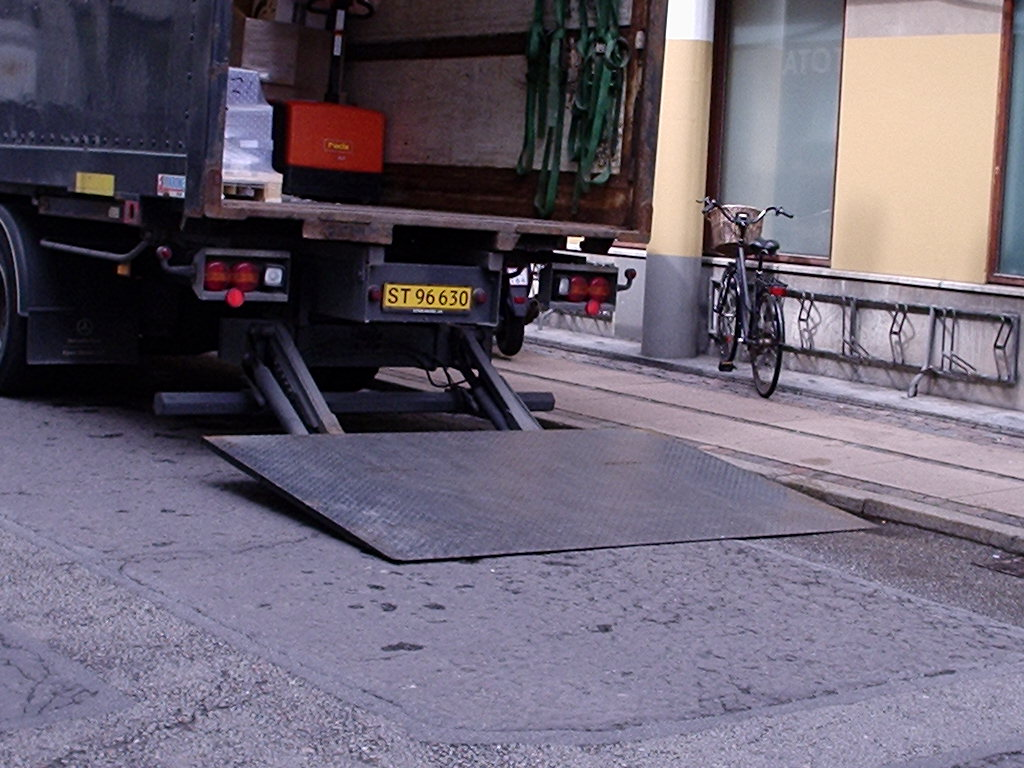
A hydraulic cantilever tail lift on the back of a truck

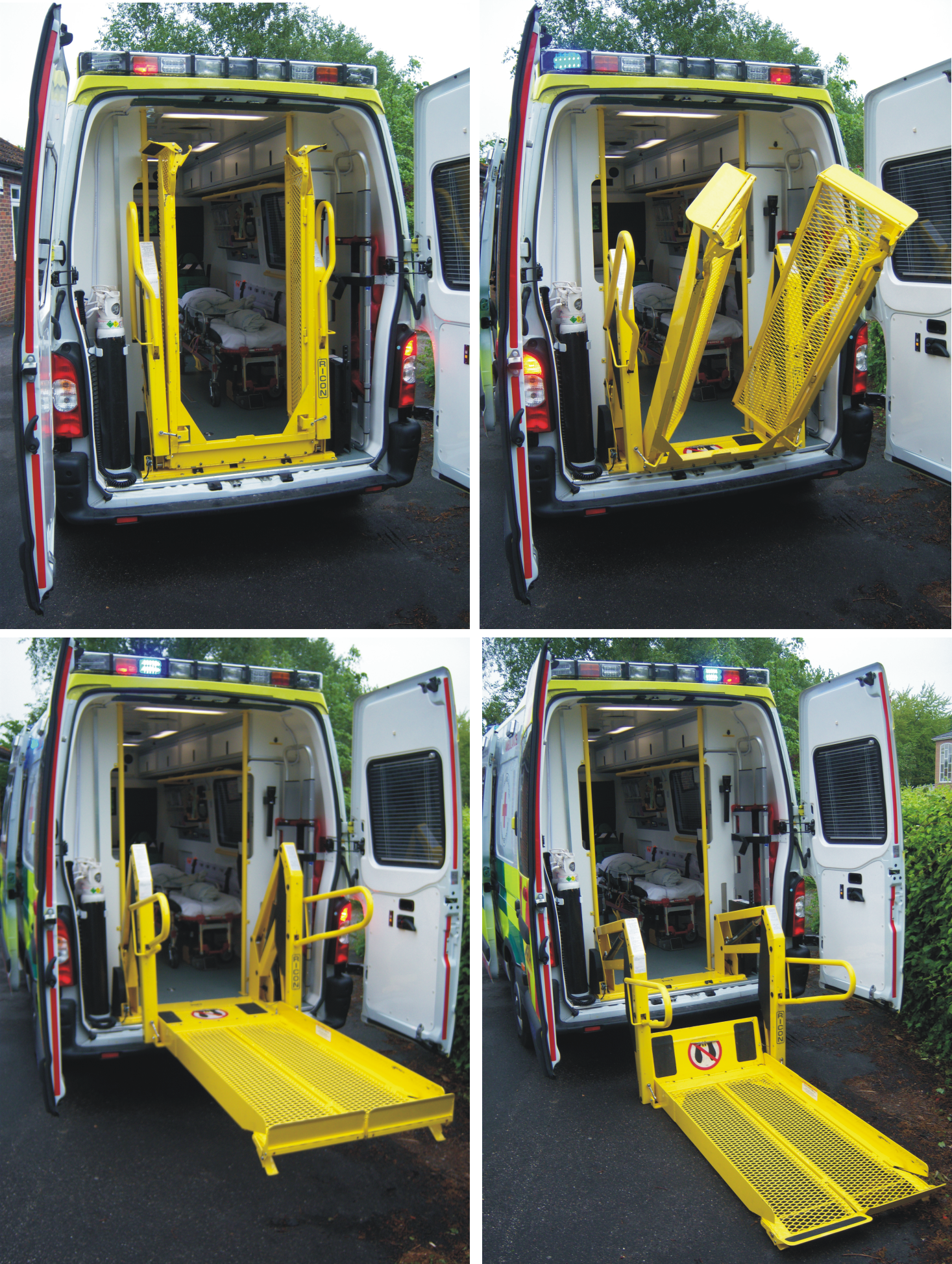
Four stages of deployment on an ambulance tail lift

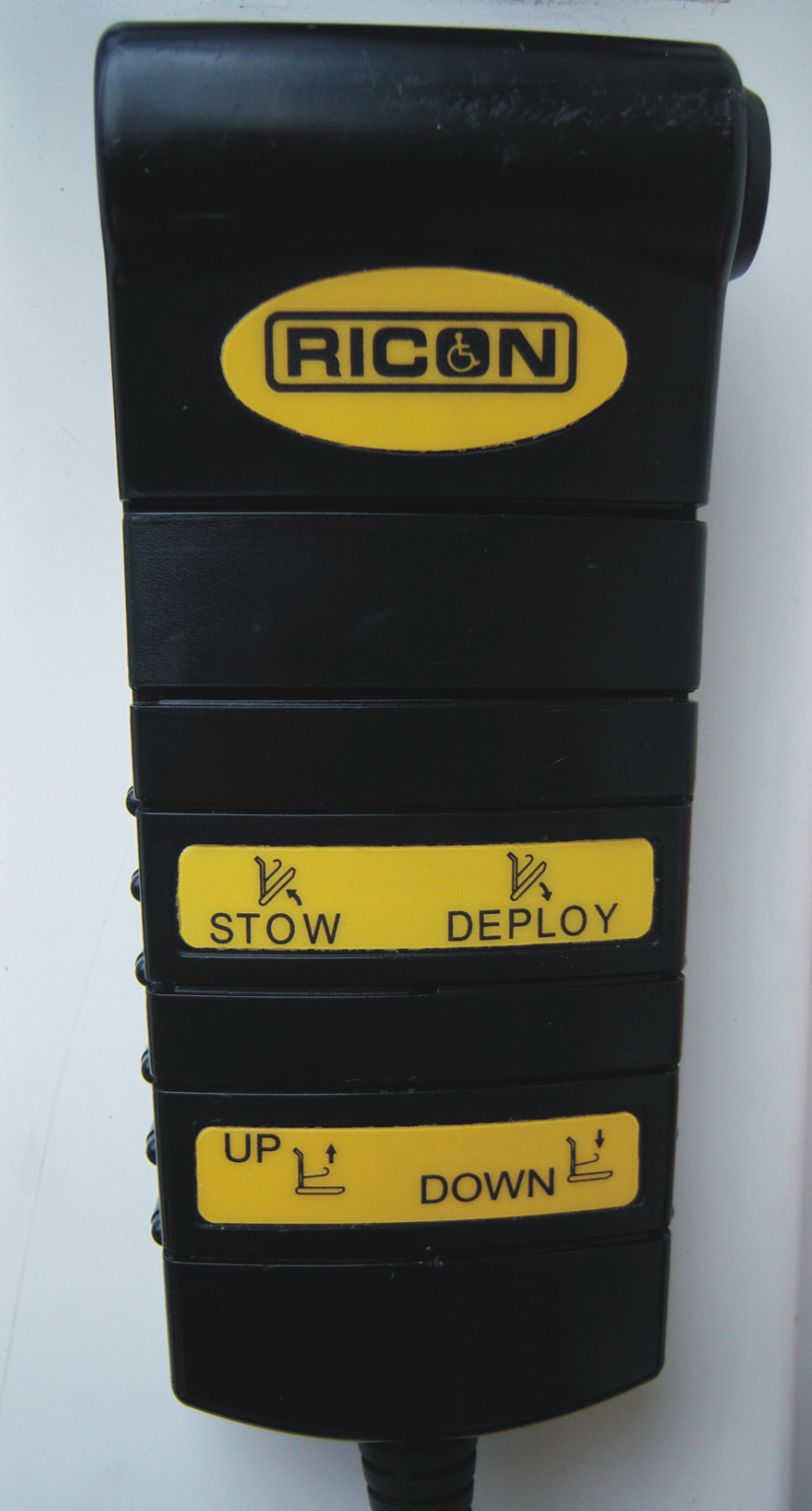
Control for a tail lift

A tail lift (term used in the UK, also called a "liftgate" in North America) is a mechanical device permanently installed on the rear of a work truck, van, or lorry, and is designed to facilitate the handling of goods from ground level or a loading dock to the level of the vehicle bed, or vice versa.

The majority of tail lifts are hydraulic or pneumatic in operation, although they can be mechanical, and are controlled by an operator using an electric relay switch.

Using a tail lift can make it unnecessary to use machinery such as a forklift truck to load heavy items on to a vehicle. A tail lift can also bridge the difference in height between a loading dock and the vehicle load bed.

Tail lifts are available for many sizes of vehicle, from standard vans to articulated lorries, and standard models can lift anywhere up to 2500kg. Some heavy-duty models can even exceed this limit, making them suitable for industrial applications where extreme loads need to be transported.

== Types ==
Tail lifts are most often categorized by design type. Tail lift design types include Parallel Arm, Railgate, Column, Cantilever, Tuckunder, and Slider.

=== Parallel Arm ===
Parallel Arm lifts support lower lifting capacities and are commonly installed on pickup trucks and service truck bodies. The parallel "arms" attach to both sides of the lifting platform and guide the platform out and away from the liftgate mainframe. Parallel Arm designs can either feature two hydraulic cylinders applying force directly to the lifting platform or a single hydraulic cylinder using some version of a cable-pulley system.

This type is particularly popular among small businesses and service industries due to its cost-effectiveness and simplicity in design.

=== Railgate ===
Railgate lifts are very similar in design to Column Lifts but (generally) support lower lifting capacities. Railgate lifts get their name from the "outrails" which install directly to the vehicle body and serve as the guides for the liftgate platform. Platforms on railgates are larger than those of parallel arm lifts and, like column lifts, fix at a 90° angle from the outrails and lift completely vertically.

Railgate lifts are often preferred for deliveries that require stable, consistent vertical motion, such as fragile or sensitive goods.

=== Column ===
Column lifts are "beefier" versions of railgates, supporting some of the highest lifting capacities of any type of hydraulic lift. Like Railgate lifts, Column Lifts feature "tracks" that install directly onto the vehicle body. From the tracks a folding platform extends and lifts completely vertically.

Column lifts have the advantage of being able to lift to a higher level than the load bed, also known as "above bed travel," and are therefore preferable for vehicles with bed heights lower than standard dock height.

The disadvantages of column lifts include that the platform is only usually able to operate at a 90° angle from the track, meaning that on uneven surfaces, the lift will not meet the ground properly.

Their robust design makes them a common choice for logistics companies handling large-scale operations.

=== Cantilever ===
Cantilever lifts work by a set of rams attached to the chassis of the vehicle. These rams are on hinges, allowing them to change angle as they expand or contract. By using the rams in sequence, the working platform can either be tilted, or raised and lowered.

Cantilever lifts have the advantage of being able to tilt, which means they can often form a ramp arrangement, which may be more appropriate for some applications. It also means that it can be easier to load or unload on uneven ground.

=== Tuckunder ===
A Tommy Gate Tuckunder Liftgate

On Tuckunder lifts, the lifting platform may be folded and stored underneath the load bed of the vehicle, leaving the option of it not being used when at a loading dock, and giving access and egress for operators without the need to operate the lift. Common tuckunder designs are either single- or dual-cylinder, with dual-cylinder designs supporting higher lifting capacities.

The Maxon company claims to have invented the first tuckunder lift in 1957 under the brand name Tuk-A-Way.

=== Slider ===
Slider Lift designs, like tuckunders, are characterized by folding and storing directly underneath the vehicle bed. However, slider designs feature lifting platforms that "slide" out from underneath the vehicle bed (instead of lowering and unfolding). Slider lift designs support some of the highest lifting capacities of any type of hydraulic lift.

== Liftgate ==
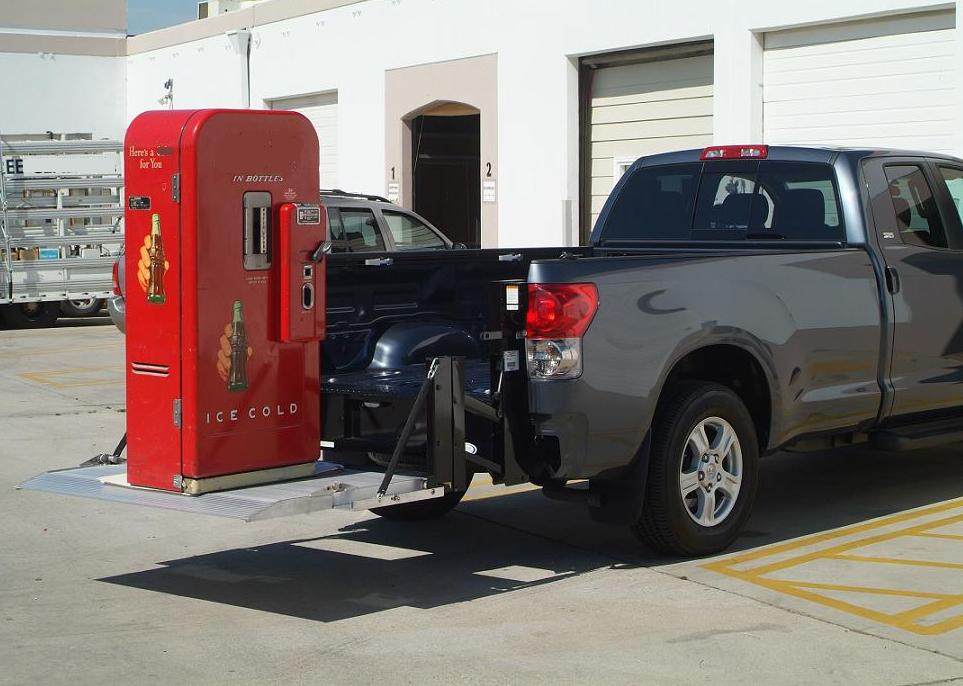
Toyota Tundra equipped with Tommy Gate parallel-arm liftgate

In North America, "liftgate" is the commonly used term for a hydraulic lift installed at the rear of a vehicle that can be used to mechanically load or unload cargo.

In the automobile industry, "liftgate" is also used to refer to the automatic rear door of a van, minivan, or crossover SUV type vehicle. This opening system is also sometimes called a "rear hatch."

Modern liftgates often come with advanced features such as remote control operation, automatic height adjustment, and integrated safety mechanisms, making them more user-friendly and efficient.
