= USS LST-310 =

United States Navy World War II tank landing ship

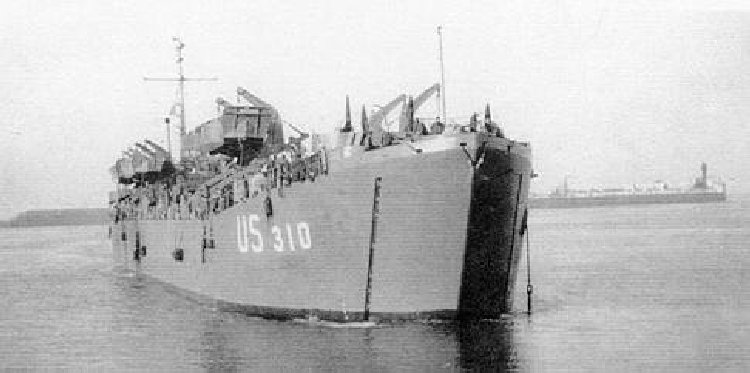
- LST-310

History

United States
- Name: USS LST-310
- Builder: Boston Navy Yard
- Laid down: 22 September 1942
- Launched: 23 November 1942
- Commissioned: 20 January 1943
- Decommissioned: 16 May 1945
- Stricken: 12 March 1946
- Fate: Sold to merchant service, 28 January 1947

General characteristics
- Class & type: LST-1 class tank landing ship
- Displacement: 1,625 long tons (1,651 t) light; 4,080 long tons (4,145 t) full
- Length: 328 ft (100 m)
- Beam: 50 ft (15 m)
- Draft: Unloaded : 2 ft 4 in (0.71 m) bow; 7 ft 6 in (2.29 m) stern; Loaded : 8 ft 2 in (2.49 m) bow; 14 ft 1 in (4.29 m) stern
- Propulsion: 2 × General Motors 12-567 diesel engines, two shafts, twin rudders
- Speed: 12 knots (14 mph; 22 km/h)
- Boats & landing craft carried: Six LCVPs
- Troops: 14 officers, 131 enlisted men
- Complement: 9 officers, 120 enlisted men
- Armament: 2 × twin 40 mm gun mounts (Mark 51 director); 4 × single 40 mm gun mounts; 12 × single 20 mm gun mounts

Service record
- Operations: World War II; Operation Husky; Operation Avalanche; Operation Overlord

USS LST-310 was one of 390 tank landing ships (LSTs) built for the United States Navy during World War II.

LST-310 was laid down on 22 September 1942 at the Boston Navy Yard; launched on 23 November 1942; sponsored by Mrs. Inga M. Gustavson; and commissioned on 20 January 1943.

== Service history ==
During World War II, LST-310 was assigned to the European Theater and participated in the Sicilian occupation in July, 1943 the landings at Salerno in September, 1943 and the Invasion of Normandy in June, 1944.

Upon her return to the United States, she was decommissioned on 16 May 1945 for conversion to landing craft repair ship USS Aeolus (ARL-42) at the Boston Navy Yard. The conversion was canceled 12 September 1945 and the ship reverted to LST-310; she was struck from the Naval Vessel Register on 12 March 1946. On 28 January 1947 the ship was sold to the Boston Metals Company of Baltimore, Maryland for conversion to merchant service.

She was sold (date unknown) to the Panama Navigation Corporation, and subsequently named MV Mercator and re-flagged as Panamanian. Sometime prior to 1963 the ship was sold to Navemar S. A. (name retained) and re-flagged Argentine. Her final fate is unknown.

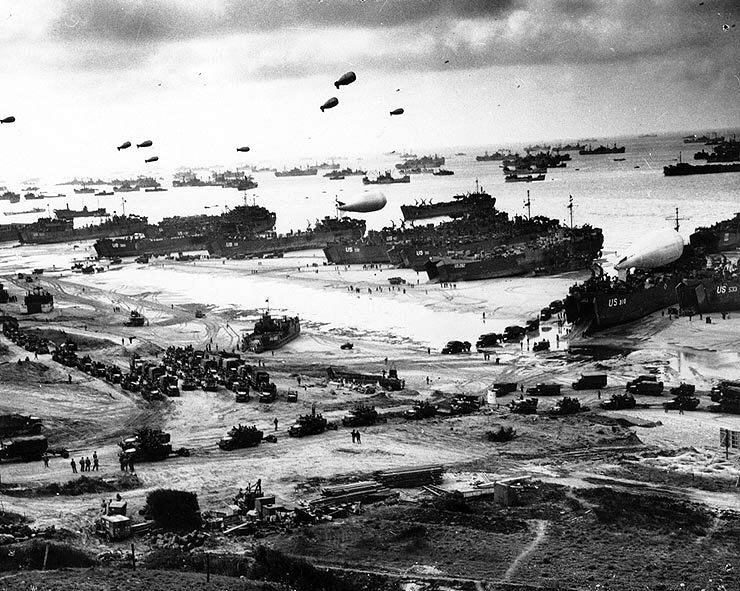
LST-310 (2nd LST from the right) along with other ships putting cargo ashore on one of the invasion beaches, at low tide during the first days of the Invasion of Normandy in June, 1944. Among identifiable ships present are LST-532 (in the center of the view); LST-262 (3rd LST from right); LST-533 (partially visible at far right); and LST-524. Note the barrage balloons overhead and Army "half-track" convoy forming up on the beach.

== Ship Awards ==
- LST-310 earned two battle stars for World War II service.
- Combat Action Ribbon (Retroactive)
- American Ribbon
- World War II Victory Medal
- Europe African Middle Eastern Campaigns Medal(3)

== See also ==
- List of United States Navy LSTs
