= Aeolus (motorcycle 1914–1916) =

- Manufacturer: Bown Manufacturing Company
- Production: 1914–1924
- Class: Motorcycle
- Engine: 147 cc two-stroke

The Aeolus was a British motorcycle manufactured between 1914 and 1916 with a 147 cc two-stroke engine by the Bown Manufacturing Company. Between 1919 and 1924, the machine was branded as the Bownian.
