= 396 Aeolia =

Main-belt asteroid

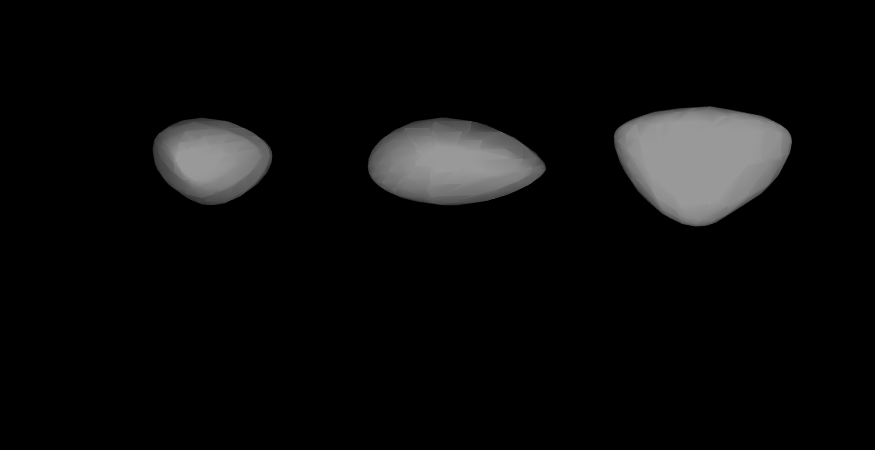
- Lightcurve-base 3D-model of 396 Aeolia.

Discovery
- Discovered by: Auguste Charlois
- Discovery date: 1 December 1894

Designations
- Pronunciation: /iːˈoʊliə/
- Named after: Aeolis
- Alternative designations: 1894 BL
- Minor planet category: Main belt (Aeolia clump)

Orbital characteristics
- Epoch 31 July 2016 (JD 2457600.5)
- Uncertainty parameter 0
- Observation arc: 89.89 yr (32,831 d)
- Aphelion: 3.17927 AU (475.612 Gm)
- Perihelion: 2.30468 AU (344.775 Gm)
- Semi-major axis: 2.74198 AU (410.194 Gm)
- Eccentricity: 0.15948
- Orbital period (sidereal): 4.54 yr (1,658.4 d)
- Mean anomaly: 81.8407°
- Mean motion: 0° 13^{m} 1.466^{s} / day
- Inclination: 2.54990°
- Longitude of ascending node: 249.930°
- Argument of perihelion: 21.8317°

Physical characteristics
- Dimensions: 34.09±3.2 km
- Synodic rotation period: 14.353 h (0.60 d)
- Geometric albedo: 0.1667±0.036
- Absolute magnitude (H): 10.0

396 Aeolia is a typical main belt asteroid. It was discovered by the French astronomer Auguste Charlois on 1 December 1894 from Nice, and may have been named for the ancient land of Aeolis. The asteroid is orbiting the Sun at a distance of 2.74 AU with a period of 4.54 years and an eccentricity (ovalness) of 0.16. The orbital plane is inclined at an angle of 2.5° to the plane of the ecliptic. This is the largest member of the eponymously named Aeolia asteroid family, a small group of asteroids with similar orbits that have an estimated age of less than 100 million years.

Analysis of the asteroid light curve based on photometry data collected during 2016 show a rotation period of 14.353±0.001 h with a brightness variation of 0.36±0.02 in magnitude. This rules out a previous estimate of 22.2 hours. It is a metallic Xe type asteroid in the SMASS classification.
