= Æolus (1787 ship) =

British slave ship (1787–1808)

History

Great Britain
- Name: Aeolus
- Launched: 1787, Liverpool
- Fate: Last listed 1808

General characteristics
- Tons burthen: Originally: 159, or 180, or 181 (bm); After lengthening: 218, or 221 (bm)
- Length: 76 ft 0 in (23.2 m) (Originally)
- Beam: 22 ft 6 in (6.9 m) (Originally)
- Complement: 1796: 20; 1800: 25; 1804: 40; 1805: 30
- Armament: 1796: 8 × 6-pounder guns; 1799: 2 × 3-pounder + 14 × 4-pounder + 4 × 12-pounder guns; 1800: 20 × 6&12–pounder guns; 1804: 20 × 4&6&12–pounder guns; 1805: 18 × 12&6&4–pounder guns
- Notes: Two decks & three masts

Aeolus (or Eolus) was built in Liverpool. Between 1787 and 1806 she made 13 voyages as a slave ship in the triangular trade in enslaved people. On one voyage she repelled an attack by a French privateer in a single ship action. She was last listed in 1808.

== Career ==
Missing volumes of Lloyd's Register (LR) and missing pages in an extant issue mean that Aeolus first appeared in Lloyd's Register (LR), in 1789.

Year	Master	Owner	Trade	Source
1789	Corbett	Staniforth	Liverpool–Africa	LR

By the time Aeolus appeared in Lloyd's Register, she had already made her first enslaving voyage.

1st voyage transporting enslaved people (1788–1789): Captain James Corbett sailed from Liverpool on 30 January 1788. He acquired captives on the Windward Coast. Aeolus arrived at St Vincent in October 1788 with 279 captives. She sailed for Liverpool on 14 November and arrived there on 5 January 1789. She had left Liverpool with 36 crew members and had suffered 11 crew deaths on her voyage.

2nd voyage transporting enslaved people (1789–1790): Captain Corbett sailed from Liverpool on 21 April 1789. Aeolus arrived at St Vincent in March 1790 with 251 captives. She arrived back at Liverpool on 4 June. She had left Liverpool with 33 crew members and had suffered eight crew deaths on her voyage.

3rd voyage transporting enslaved people (1791–1792): Captain Corbett sailed from Liverpool on 6 February 1791, bound for the Sierra Leone estuary. In February Lloyd's List reported that Eolus, Corbet, master, had put into Loch Ryan after having lost her mizzen mast. She was on her way to Africa from Liverpool.

Aeolus started acquiring captives on 14 March, first at Bassa and then at Grand Cape Mount. Captain Corbett died on 19 October. Aeolus sailed from Africa on 28 October under the command of Captain James Thompson. She had embarked 296 captives and she arrived at St Vincent on 6 December with 290 captives, for a mortality rate of 2%. Aeolus departed St Vincent on 28 December, and arrived back at Liverpool on 10 February 1792. She had left Liverpool with 30 crew members and had suffered two crew deaths on her voyage.

After the passage of Dolben's Act in 1788, masters received a bonus of £100 for a mortality rate of under 2%; the ship's surgeon received £50. For a mortality rate between two and three per cent, the bonus was halved. There was no bonus if mortality exceeded 3%. (Note: At the time the monthly wage for a captain of a slave ship out of Bristol was £5 per month.)

4th voyage transporting enslaved people (1792–1793): Captain John Kelly sailed from Liverpool on 16 April 1792.

Aeolus started acquiring captives at Bassa on 1 May, and departed Africa on 23 February 1793. Aeolus had embarked 302 captives and arrived at Grenada on 23 February 1793 with 295 captives, for a mortality rate of 2%. At Grenada Captain Kelly left Aeolus and Captain William Williams replaced him. Aeolus departed Grenada on 24 April and arrived at Liverpool on 7 June. She had left Liverpool with 24 crew members and had suffered eight crew deaths on her voyage.

5th voyage transporting enslaved people (1794–1795): Captain John Lewes Neale sailed from Liverpool on 5 September 1794. Aeolus arrived at Africa and on 23 December started acquiring captives at Cape Coast Castle and Anomabu. Aeolus sailed from Africa on 26 February 1795 and arrived at Kingston, Jamaica on 3 May with 294 captives. She sailed from Kingston on 23 July and arrived back at Liverpool on 11 October. She had left Liverpool with 28 crew members and had suffered five crew deaths on her voyage.

In 1795, while Aeolus was off Nevis, a French privateer of eight guns attacked Eolus. After a running engagement of three hours the French privateer left, having suffered considerable damage. Eolus had suffered no damage.

6th voyage transporting enslaved people (1796–1797): Captain Neale acquired a letter of marque on 30 May 1796. He sailed from Liverpool on 16 June. In 1796, 103 vessels sailed from English ports bound for Africa on voyages to acquire and transport enslaved people; 94 of these vessels sailed from Liverpool.

Aeolus started acquiring captives on 13 September, first at Cape Coast Castle and then at Anombau. Aeolus arrived at St Vincent in March 1793 with 284 captives. She arrived back at Liverpool on 28 May. She had left Liverpool with 20 crew members and had no crew deaths on her voyage.

Aeolus underwent lengthening in 1797.

7th voyage transporting enslaved people (1797–1798): Captain Neale sailed from Liverpool on 18 September 1797. In 1797, 104 vessels sailed from English ports bound for Africa on voyages to acquire and transport enslaved people; 90 of these vessels sailed from Liverpool.

Aeolus acquired captives first at Cape Coast Castle, and then some 1350 miles SSE at Rio Dande in Angola. Aeolus arrived at Barbados on 19 February 1798 with 353 captives. She sailed from Barbados on 15 March and arrived back at Liverpool on 10 May. She had left Liverpool with 41 crew members and had experienced no crew deaths on her voyage.

8th voyage transporting enslaved people (1798–1799): Captain Neale sailed from Liverpool on 20 September 1798. In 1798, 160 vessels sailed from English ports bound for Africa on voyages to acquire and transport enslaved people; 159 of these vessels sailed from Liverpool. This was the most vessels in the period 1795–1804.

Aeolus acquired captives at Bonny. Aeolus arrived at Grenada on 23 April 1799 with 338 captives. She left Grenada on 25 June and arrived at Liverpool on 21 August. She had left Liverpool with 43 crew members and had suffered two crew deaths on her voyage.

Year	Master	Owner	Trade	Source & notes
1799	J.L.Neale; C.Walker	Stanforth	Liverpool–Africa	LR; repaired 1794, & lengthened 1797

9th voyage transporting enslaved people (1800–1801): Captain Charles Walker acquired a letter of marque on 12 March 1800. He sailed from Liverpool on 20 April 1800. In 1800, 133 vessels sailed from English ports bound for Africa on voyages to acquire and transport enslaved people; 120 of these vessels sailed from Liverpool.

Aeolus acquired captives at New Calabar. She arrived at Kingston on 20 December with 272 captives. Aeolus sailed from Kingston on 25 February 1801 and arrived back at Liverpool on 30 April, having sailed via Jamaica and having left the convoy on 26 April off Cape Clear. She had left Liverpool with 35 crew members and had suffered six crew deaths on her voyage.

10th voyage transporting enslaved people (1801–1802): Captain Walker sailed from Liverpool on 25 July 1801. In 1801, 147 vessels sailed from English ports bound for Africa on voyages to acquire and transport enslaved people; 122 of these vessels sailed from Liverpool.

Aeolus acquired captives at New Calabar and Eolus was also reported to have been at Cape Coast Castle. Aeolus arrived at Suriname on 9 January 1802 with 171 captives. She arrived back at Liverpool on 21 May. She had left Liverpool with 35 crew members and had suffered six crew deaths on her voyage.

11th voyage transporting enslaved people (1802–1803): Captain Walker sailed from Liverpool on 31 August 1802. In 1802, 155 vessels sailed from English ports bound for Africa on voyages to acquire and transport enslaved people; 122 of these vessels sailed from Liverpool.

Aeolus arrived at Demerara on 1 February 1803. She sailed for Liverpool on 13 March and arrived there on 26 May. She had left Liverpool with 25 crew members and had suffered four crew deaths on her voyage.

12th voyage transporting enslaved people (1804–1805): Captain Gilbert Wenman acquired a letter of marque on 25 January 1804. He sailed from Liverpool on 7 April 1804. In 1804, 147 vessels sailed from English ports bound for Africa on voyages to acquire and transport enslaved people; 126 of these vessels sailed from Liverpool.

Aeolus acquired captives at Anomabu. She arrived at Demerara on 13 November with 233 captives. She sailed from Demerara on 11 January 1805, and arrived back at Liverpool on 14 April. She had left Liverpool with 41 crew members and suffered two crew deaths on her voyage.

13th voyage transporting enslaved people (1805–1806): Captain George Robertson acquired a letter of marque on 19 July 1805. He sailed from Liverpool on 12 August 1805 and gathered captives at Cape Coast Castle. Aeolus sailed from Africa on 16 January 1806 and arrived at St Vincent in March. She sailed from St Vincent on 3 May and arrived at London on 10 July. She had left Liverpool with 42 crew members and had suffered two crew deaths on her voyage.

== Fate ==
The Slave Trade Act 1807 ended British participation in the trans-Atlantic slave trade. Aeolus was last listed in Lloyd's Register in 1808 with data that was unchanged from 1806.
