= USS Aeolus (SP-186) =

Patrol vessel proposed for the United States Navy

History

United States
- Name: USS Aeolus
- Namesake: Aeolus, the god of the winds in Greek mythology
- Builder: Joe Polliot, Detroit, Michigan
- Completed: 1915
- Acquired: Not acquired
- Commissioned: Never commissioned
- Fate: Remained in civilian service
- Notes: Civilian motorboat inspected for possible United States Navy service but never acquired

General characteristics
- Type: Proposed patrol vessel
- Tonnage: 67 tons
- Length: 83 ft 6 in (25.45 m)
- Beam: 16 ft 6 in (5.03 m)
- Draft: 4 ft 8 in (1.42 m)
- Speed: 10.5 knots
- Complement: 11 planned
- Armament: Planned: two 1-pounder guns and one machine gun

USS Aeolus (SP-186) was the proposed name and section patrol designation for a civilian motorboat inspected for possible United States Navy service during World War I. The vessel was assigned the designation SP-186, but was never acquired by the Navy and did not enter naval service.

== Background ==
Aeolus was built in 1915 by Joe Polliot at Detroit, Michigan. She was a civilian motorboat at the time the Navy inspected her for possible wartime use.

During World War I, the U.S. Navy examined many privately owned motorboats, yachts and small craft for potential use as patrol vessels. These vessels were often assigned SP numbers, short for section patrol, whether or not they were ultimately taken into service. Aeolus received the designation SP-186, but the Navy never acquired her.

== Planned naval use ==
Had Aeolus been acquired, she would probably have been used as a small patrol craft. Her planned naval complement was 11 men, and her proposed armament consisted of two 1-pounder guns and one machine gun.

Her recorded characteristics were:

- tonnage: 67 tons
- length: 83 ft 6 in (25.45 m)
- beam: 16 ft 6 in (5.03 m)
- draft: 4 ft 8 in (1.42 m)
- speed: 10.5 knots
- planned complement: 11
- planned armament: two 1-pounder guns and one machine gun

== Fate ==
Because the Navy did not acquire Aeolus, she was never commissioned as a United States Navy vessel. Her subsequent civilian history is not recorded in the standard online naval references for the vessel.
