= USS PC-1261 =

US Navy ship in WWII

Coordinates: 49°30′N 01°10′W

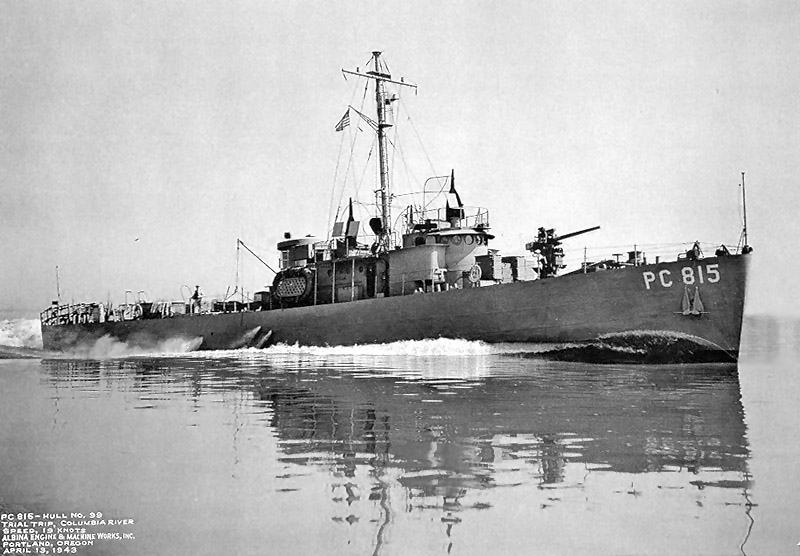
- USS PC-815, a similar PC-416 class submarine chaser

History

United States
- Name: USS PC-1261
- Builder: Leathem D. Smith Shipbuilding Company, Sturgeon Bay, Wisconsin
- Laid down: 20 November 1942
- Launched: 28 February 1943
- Commissioned: May 1943
- Fate: Sunk by shellfire off the coast of Normandy, 6 June 1944
- Stricken: 29 July 1944

General characteristics
- Class & type: PC-461-class submarine chaser
- Displacement: 280 long tons (284 t) (light); 450 long tons (457 t) (full)
- Length: 173 ft 8 in (52.93 m)
- Beam: 23 ft (7.0 m)
- Draft: 10 ft 10 in (3.30 m)
- Installed power: 5,760 shp (4,300 kW)
- Propulsion: 2 × Fairbanks Morse 38D8 1/8 diesel engines; 1 × Westinghouse single reduction gear; 2 × shafts
- Speed: 20 kn (23 mph; 37 km/h)
- Complement: 65
- Armament: 1 × 3 in (76 mm)/50 cal dual-purpose gun, 1 × 40 mm gun, 3 × 20 mm cannons, 2 × rocket launchers, 4 × depth charge throwers, 2 × depth charge tracks

USS PC-1261 was a PC-461-class submarine chaser built for the United States Navy during World War II. She was the first ship sunk during the D-Day landings on 6 June 1944, when she was hit by shellfire from German shore batteries.

== Career ==
PC-1261 was laid down on 20 November 1942 by the Leathem D. Smith Shipbuilding Company in Sturgeon Bay, Wisconsin, and launched on 28 February 1943. She was commissioned in May 1943 and was sent to Europe and participated in the Normandy Landings.

On 6 June 1944, PC-1261 led the first wave of landing craft at Utah Beach. While en route to the beach, she was struck by an artillery shell and foundered. She was the first ship sunk on D-Day.
