= SS Empire Addison =

World War II merchant ship of the United Kingdom

History
- Name: Empire Addison (1942–45); Philosopher (1945–59); Aiolos (1959–63)
- Owner: Ministry of War Transport (1941–45); Charente Steamship Co Ltd (1945–59); Concordia Shipping Corporation (1959–63)
- Operator: T & J Harrison (1942–59); Concordia Shipping Corporation (1959–63)
- Port of registry: Greenock (1942–59); Liberia (1959–63)
- Builder: Lithgows Ltd, Port Glasgow
- Launched: 31 December 1941
- Completed: March 1942
- Identification: UK Official Number 168290 (1942–59); Code letters BDPF (1942–59)
- Fate: Scrapped in Hong Kong, 1963

General characteristics
- Tonnage: 7,010 GRT
- Length: 431 ft (131.37 m)
- Beam: 56 ft 2 in (17.12 m)
- Depth: 34 ft 2 in (10.41 m)
- Propulsion: 1 x triple expansion steam engine of 519 hp (387 kW)
- Speed: 10 knots (19 km/h)

SS Empire Addison was a 7,010 ton steamship which was built in 1941 for the Ministry of War Transport (MoWT), she was sold in 1945 becoming Philosopher, and sold to Liberia in 1959 and renamed Aiolos serving until scrapped in 1963.

== History ==
Empire Addison was built by Lithgows, Port Glasgow and launched in on 31 December 1941, she was completed in March 1942.

=== War service ===
Empire Addison was a member of a number of convoys.

KMS 57

Convoy KMS 57, sailed from Liverpool on 12 July 1944 bound for Gibraltar, where it arrived on 25 July 1944. Empire Addison was carrying general cargo, destined for the Persian Gulf.

KMS83

Convoy KMS 83, sailed from Liverpool on 6 February 1945 to Gibraltar, where it arrived on 10 February 1945. Empire Addison was carrying general cargo, destined for Port Said, Bombay and Karachi.

=== Postwar service ===
In 1945, Empire Addison was sold to the Charente Steamship Co Ltd, and renamed Philosopher. In 1959, she was sold to the Concordia Shipping Corporation, Liberia, and renamed Aiolos. She was scrapped in Hong Kong in 1963.

== Official number and code letters ==
Official Numbers were a forerunner to IMO Numbers.

Empire Addison had the UK Official Number 168290 and used the Code Letters BDPF.
