= Aeolian Hall =

Aeolian Hall may refer to:

- Aeolian Hall (42nd Street), a concert hall near Times Square in Midtown Manhattan, New York City
- Aeolian Hall (5th Avenue), a former concert hall at 689, 5th Avenue, Manhattan, New York City
- Aeolian Hall (London), England, a concert hall between 1904 and around 1940
- Aeolian Hall (London, Ontario), a historic music venue in London, Ontario
- Aeolian Hall, Sydney, a concert hall in Sydney, Australia
