= Aeolus Railroad Car =

One of the early experiments in railroad cars, the yachtlike Aeolus, named in honor of Aeolus from mythology, was designed to sail before the wind. Evan Thomas designed the vehicle, which was tried on the Baltimore and Ohio Railroad in 1830. On one occasion the Aeolus failed to stop when it reached the end of the finished track, and ran into an embankment. Nevertheless, the invention worked on windy days, and impressed the Russian Ambassador, Pavel Kridener. The Aeolus was never put into regular service.
