= Eolia 25 =

Sailboat class

Development
- Designer: Philippe Briand
- Location: France
- Year: 1983
- No. built: 1288
- Builder: Jeanneau
- Role: Cruiser
- Name: Eolia 25

Boat
- Displacement: 3,750 lb (1,701 kg)
- Draft: 4.75 ft (1.45 m)

Hull
- Type: monohull
- Construction: fiberglass
- LOA: 24.58 ft (7.49 m)
- LWL: 21.67 ft (6.61 m)
- Beam: 9.17 ft (2.80 m)
- Engine: Yanmar 7 to 10 hp (5 to 7 kW) diesel engine

Hull appendages
- Keel: fin keel
- Ballast: 1,543 lb (700 kg)
- Rudder: transom-mounted rudder

Rig
- Rig type: Bermuda rig
- I foretriangle height: 29.92 ft (9.12 m)
- J foretriangle base: 9.16 ft (2.79 m)
- P mainsail luff: 24.92 ft (7.60 m)
- E mainsail foot: 8.16 ft (2.49 m)

Sails
- Sailplan: masthead sloop
- Mainsail area: 113 sq ft (10.5 m^{2})
- Jib/genoa area: jib - 92 sq ft (8.5 m^{2}) genoa - 210 sq ft (20 m^{2})
- Spinnaker area: 466 sq ft (43.3 m^{2})
- Other sails: storm jib - 41 sq ft (3.8 m^{2})
- Upwind sail area: 323 sq ft (30.0 m^{2})
- Downwind sail area: 579 sq ft (53.8 m^{2})
- Total sail area: 238.71 sq ft (22.177 m^{2})

Racing
- PHRF: 243

The Eolia 25 is a French trailerable sailboat that was designed by Philippe Briand as a coastal cruiser and first built in 1983.

== Production ==
The design was built by Jeanneau in France from 1983 until 1989, with 1288 boats completed, but it is now out of production.

== Design ==
The Eolia 25 is a recreational keelboat, built predominantly of single skin fiberglass polyester, with wood trim. It has a masthead sloop rig, with aluminum spars and wire standing rigging. It has a deck-stepped mast and a single set of unswept spreaders. The hull has a raked stem, a plumb transom, a transom-hung rudder controlled by a tiller and a fixed fin keel or, optionally a stub keel and centerboard. The fin keel version displaces 3,750 lb (1,701 kg) and carries 1,543 lb (700 kg) of cast iron ballast, while the stub keel and centerboard version displaces 4,034 lb (1,830 kg) and carries 1,830 lb (830 kg) of cast iron ballast, with a steel centerboard.

The keel-equipped version of the boat has a draft of 4.75 ft (1.45 m), while the centreboard-equipped version has a draft of 5.92 ft (1.80 m) with the centerboard extended and 2.58 ft (0.79 m) with it retracted, allowing operation in shallow water or ground transportation on a trailer.

The boat is fitted with a Japanese Yanmar diesel engine of 7 to 10 hp (5 to 7 kW), or an optional 6 to 8 hp (4 to 6 kW) outboard motor for docking and maneuvering. The fuel tank holds 5 U.S. gallons (19 L; 4.2 imp gal).

The design has sleeping accommodation for four people, with a double "V"-berth in the bow around a drop-down dinette table and an aft cabin with a double berth on the port side. The galley is located on the port side just forward of the companionway ladder. The galley is L-shaped and is equipped with a two-burner stove, a 13.2 U.S. gallons (50 L; 11.0 imp gal) icebox and a sink. A navigation station is opposite the galley, on the starboard side. The enclosed head is located just aft of the companionway on the starboard side. The fresh water tank has a capacity of 14.8 U.S. gallons (56 L; 12.3 imp gal). Cabin headroom is 68 in (173 cm).

For sailing downwind the design may be equipped with a symmetrical spinnaker of 466 sq ft (43.3 m^{2}).

The design has a PHRF racing average handicap of 243 and a hull speed of 6.2 kn (11.5 km/h).

== Operational history ==
In a 2010 review Steve Henkel wrote, "the Jeanneau Eolia 25 was available either as a fin keeler (fixed draft 4' 9", shown here) or as a keel-centerboarder (draft 2' 7" board up, or 5' 11" board down). Although an outboard was an option, a high percentage of the boats sold have a raw-water-cooled Yanmar 1GM1O diesel of 7.5 hp. Either choice should power the Eolia 25 at hull speed. Best features: We think the layout is quite clever, with a double berth aft under the cockpit, an enclosed stand-up head in the highest location in the cabin, a modest-sized but practical nav station, and a U-shaped dining area seating up to 7 of 8 souls for that relaxing after-the-race beverage. The table slides down on the mast compression strut to form the center portion of a double berth, The arrangement below makes the cabin seem quite airy and pleas- ant, despite a too-small forward hatch and no opening ports, Worst features: We can't imagine why this boat has a PHRF rating 30 to 40 seconds a mile higher than her comp[etitor]s. We don't think she deserves such harsh treatment."

== See also ==
- List of sailing boat types
