= Eolian (Solar car) =

Eolian is the name of a series of solar vehicles designed and manufactured by students, workers and professors at the University of Chile. The project involves different disciplines, including mechanical engineers, electrical engineers and industrial designers.

== Eolian ==
Eolian was the first Chilean solar car, and was built in 2007. The idea started with a group of engineering students who had previously worked on an electric car in a local race called Formula-i.

The car is a tricycle with two fronts wheels and one rear wheel. The chassis is made of a composite with a core of balsa wood, the external fuselage is made of a fiberglass composite. It has 6 square meters of photo-voltaic cells, an induction engine with permanent magnets in the rear wheel and two battery compartments containing lithium cells.

Eolian took part in the 2007 World Solar Challenge and finished in 14th place.

== Eolian 2 ==
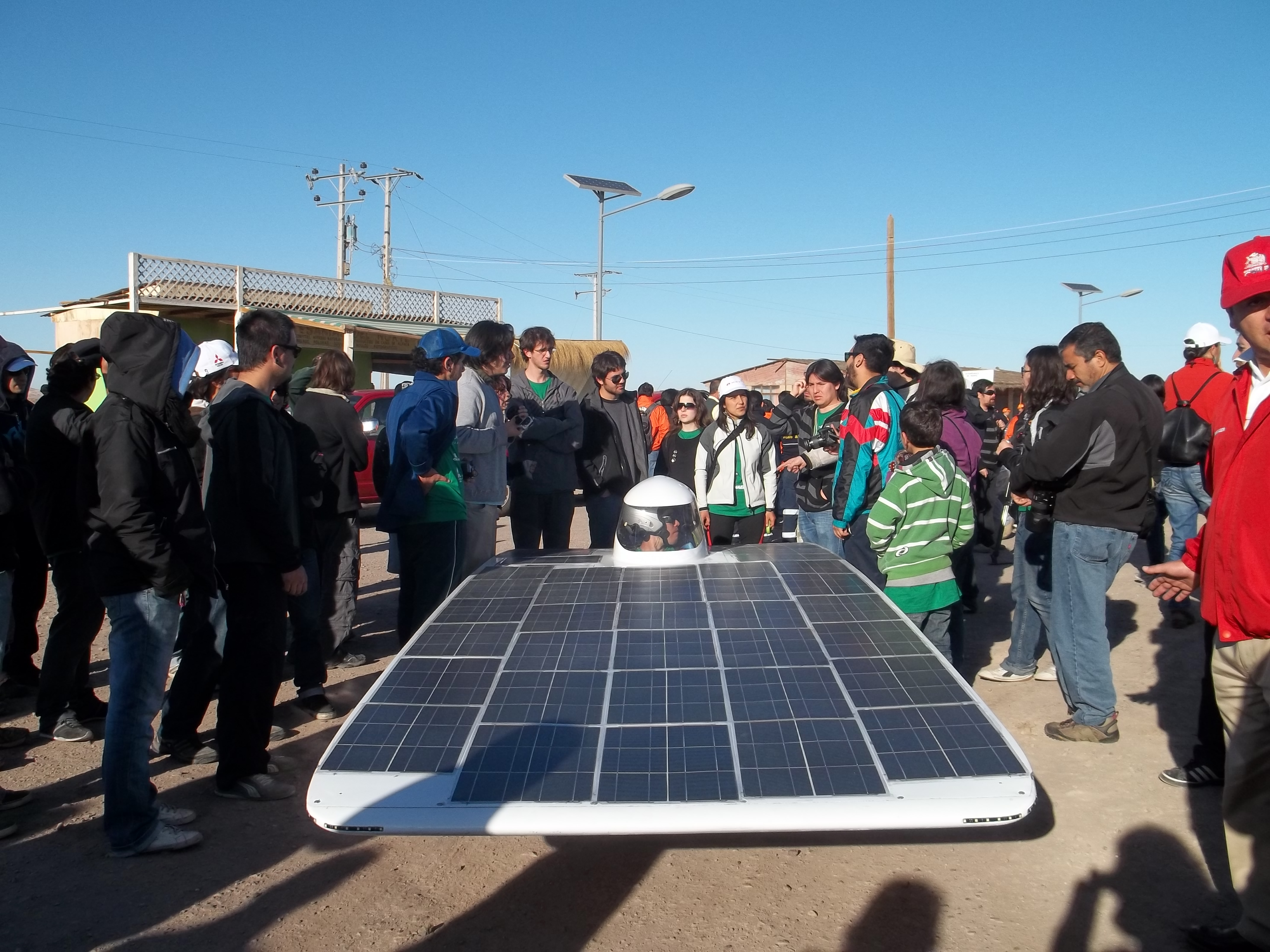
Eolian 2 in the Atacama Solar Challenge 2011

Eolian 2 is the second solar car from the University of Chile built in 2011 by a new team of students.

The car has a similar basic configuration to Eolian 1, but with differences that produce a better aerodynamic performance, more reliable structural design and an improved maneuverability. One of the main innovations was the use of carbon fiber in the composite materials of the chassis, which makes the car lighter.

Eolian 2 took part in the 2011 Atacama Solar Challenge race, taking second place and in the 2011 World Solar Challenge race, finishing 22nd. Due to the fact that the dates of the races were very close together, the project considered building two cars. The vehicle was divided into three pieces so that it could be shipped to Australia.
