= USS LST-380 =

1943 LST-1-class tank landing ship

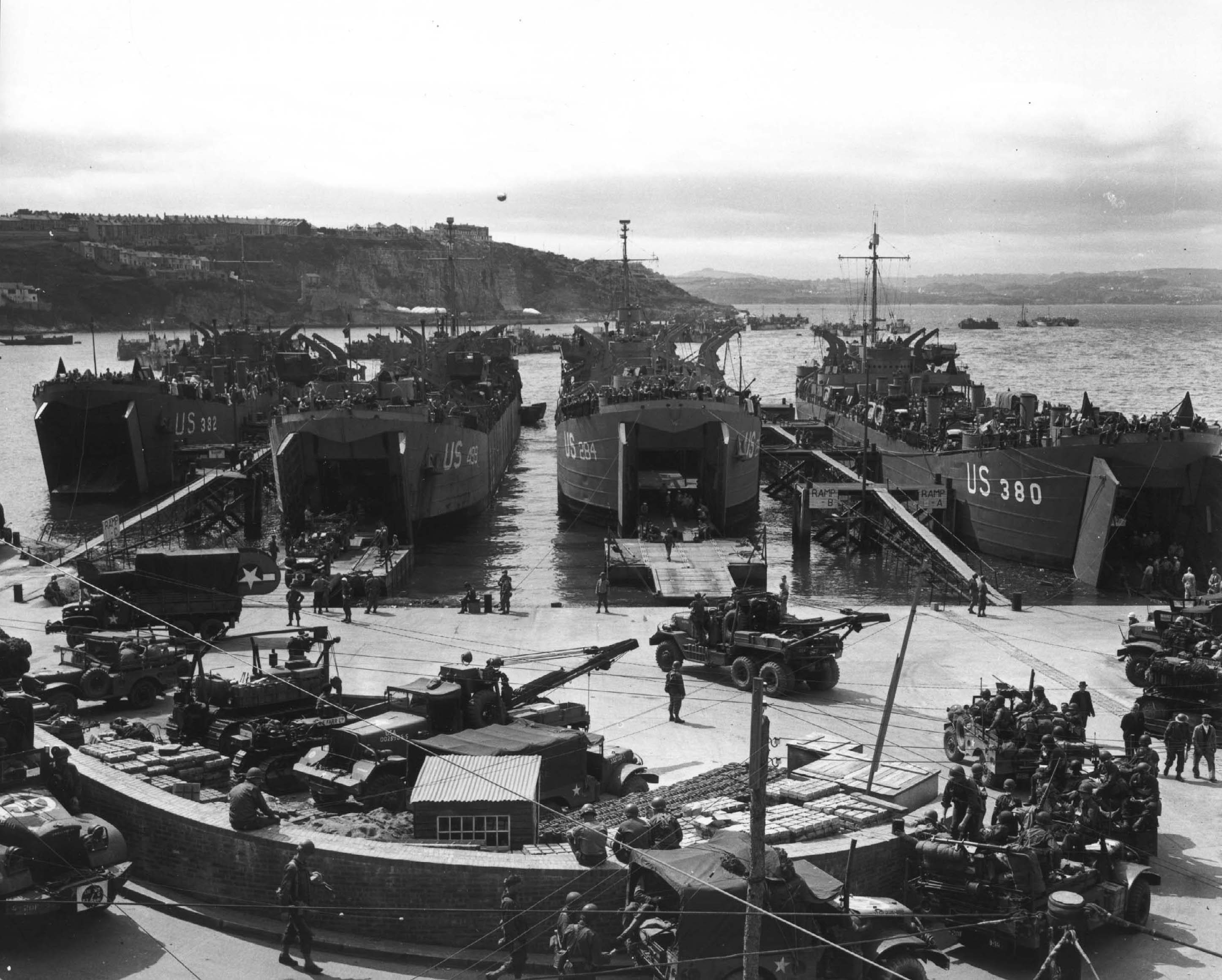
- LST-380 loading on 1 June 1944, alongside other ships

History

United States
- Name: USS LST-380
- Builder: Bethlehem Steel Company, Quincy, Massachusetts
- Laid down: 10 December 1942
- Launched: 10 February 1943
- Commissioned: 15 February 1943
- Decommissioned: 7 June 1946
- Stricken: 19 July 1946
- Honours and awards: 3 battle stars (WWII)
- Fate: Loaned to UK, 20 November 1944; Returned, 11 April 1946; Sold, 7 June 1946, lost 25 August 1958

United Kingdom
- Name: HM LST-380
- Acquired: 20 November 1944
- Commissioned: 20 November 1944
- Fate: Returned to US Navy, April 1946

General characteristics
- Class & type: LST-1-class tank landing ship
- Displacement: 1,625 long tons (1,651 t) light; 4,080 long tons (4,145 t) full
- Length: 328 ft (100 m)
- Beam: 50 ft (15 m)
- Draft: Light : 2 ft 4 in (0.71 m) forward; 7 ft 6 in (2.29 m) aft; Sea-going : 8 ft 3 in (2.51 m) forward; 14 ft 1 in (4.29 m) aft; Landing : 3 ft 11 in (1.19 m) forward; 9 ft 10 in (3.00 m) aft
- Propulsion: 2 × General Motors 12-567 diesel engines, two shafts, twin rudders
- Speed: 12 knots (22 km/h; 14 mph)
- Range: 24,000 nmi (44,000 km) at 9 kn (17 km/h; 10 mph)
- Boats & landing craft carried: 2 × LCVPs
- Troops: 163
- Complement: 111
- Armament: 2 × twin 40 mm gun mounts w/Mk.51 directors; 4 × single 40 mm gun mounts; 12 × single 20 mm gun mounts

USS LST-380 was a LST-1-class tank landing ship of the United States Navy during World War II, later loaned to the Royal Navy.

LST-380 was laid down on 10 December 1942 at Quincy, Massachusetts, by the Bethlehem Steel Company; launched on 10 February 1943; sponsored by Mrs. D. J. Callahan; and commissioned on 15 February 1943.

During World War II, LST-380 was assigned to the European theater and participated in the following operations:

- Sicilian occupation — July 1943
- Salerno landings — September 1943
- Invasion of Normandy — June 1944

LST-380 was transferred to the United Kingdom on 20 November 1944 and returned to United States Navy custody on 11 April 1946. On 7 June 1946, the tank landing ship was sold to the United States Military Government, Korea, and struck from the Navy list on 19 July 1946.

LST-380 earned three battle stars for World War II service.
