= Aeolus (motorcycle 1903–1905) =

1903 492cc Aelous

The Aeolus was designed and built by Edward Hugh Owen of the Motor Transport Co, Comeragh Rd, London between 1903 and 1905, and featured a 492cc single-cylinder engine with shaft drive to the rear wheel. Bevel gear pairs at the engine and rear wheel turned the shaft drive. Production was on a limited scale.
