= HMS Aeolus =

Five ships of the Royal Navy have been named HMS Aeolus, after one of a number of figures named Aeolus who appear in Greek mythology: (Note: Note, in old records the name is sometimes given as Eolus, or Æolus.)

- HMS Aeolus (1758) was a 32-gun fifth-rate frigate launched in 1758. She was placed on harbour service in 1796, renamed HMS Guernsey in 1800, and was broken up in 1801.
- HMS Aeolus (1800) was formerly the French ship Pallas, a 36-gun fifth rate, that a squadron captured in 1800 off the coast of France. She was renamed to Pique in 1801. She was sold for breaking up in 1819.
- HMS Aeolus (1801) was a 32-gun fifth-rate frigate launched in 1801 and broken up 1817.
- HMS Aeolus (1825) was a 46-gun fifth-rate frigate launched in 1825. She was used for harbour service from 1855 and was broken up in 1886.
- HMS Aeolus (1891) was an Apollo-class second-class protected cruiser launched in 1891 and sold in 1914.
