= List of Captain-class frigates =

The Captain class was a designation given to 78 frigates of the Royal Navy, constructed in the United States, launched in 1942–1943 and delivered to the United Kingdom under the provisions of the Lend-Lease agreement (the program under which the United States supplied the United Kingdom and other Allied nations with materials between 1941 and 1945), they were drawn from two subclasses of the American destroyer escort (originally British destroyer escort) classification; 32 from the GMT type Evarts subclass and 46 from the TE type Buckley subclass.

== Naming ==
It was the intention of the Admiralty that these ships were to be named after captains that served with Vice-Admiral Horatio Nelson at the Battle of Trafalgar but as building continued, it became necessary to delve back further into history for names of admirals and captains of reputation.

Sixty-six of the 78 frigates bear names that had not previously been allocated earlier Royal Navy ships. Lawford, Louis, Manners, Moorsom, Mounsey, Narborough, Pasley and Seymour had been previously used for destroyers during World War I. Rupert was the fifth of that name since 1666. Torrington was the fourth of that name since 1654. Holmes had been used once before in 1671 and Fitzroy, after Robert FitzRoy, the pioneering meteorologist, had previously been used for a survey vessel in 1919.

== Ships ==
=== Evarts group (diesel-electric machinery) ===
The Evarts subclass had diesel-electric machinery, based on an arrangement used for submarines. There were two shafts. Four Winton 278A 16-cylinder engines, with a combined rating of 7,040 bhp (5,250 kW), driving General Electric Company (GE) generators (4,800 kW) supplied power to two GE electric motors, with an output of 6,000 shp (4,500 kW), for 20 knots (37 km/h). For this reason they were referred to as the GMT (General Motors Tandem) type. It had been intended to provide a further set of this machinery, for an output of 12,000 shp (8,900 kW) to make the design speed of 24 knots (44 km/h), but hull production greatly outstripped that of the machinery, therefore only one set of machinery was used per ship. All the DE Captains were built by Boston Navy Yard. Except HMS Drury (K316) who appears to be the odd one out.

Ship	Pennant	U.S. hull no.	Namesake	Laid down	Launched	Commissioned	Fate
Bayntun	K310	(B)DE-1	Henry William Bayntun (Note: Served at Battle of Trafalgar under Nelson)	5 April 1942	27 June 1942	13 February 1943	Returned to US Navy 22 August 1945, sold for scrapping, 17 June 1947
Bazely	K311	(B)DE-2	John Bazely	5 April 1942	27 June 1942	18 February 1943	Returned to US Navy 20 August 1945, scrapped, 1946
Berry	K312	(B)DE-3	Edward Berry	22 September 1942	23 November 1942	15 February 1943	Returned to US Navy 15 February 1946, sold for scrapping, 9 November 1946
Blackwood	K313	(B)DE-4	Henry Blackwood	22 September 1942	23 November 1942	27 March 1943	Torpedoed on 15 June 1944 and foundered the next day
Burges	K347	(B)DE-12	Richard Rundle Burges	8 December 1942	26 January 1943	2 June 1943	Returned to US Navy 27 February 1946, sold for scrapping, 14 November 1946
Capel	K470	DE-266	Thomas Bladen Capel	11 March 1943	22 April 1943	16 August 1943	Sunk on 26 December 1944
Cooke	K471	DE-267	John Cooke	11 March 1943	22 April 1943	30 August 1943	Returned to US Navy 5 March 1946, sold, 1947
Dacres	K472	DE-268	James Richard Dacres	7 April 1943	19 May 1943	28 August 1943	Returned to US Navy 26 January 1946, sold for scrapping, 14 December 1946
Domett	K473	DE-269	William Domett	7 April 1943	19 May 1943	3 September 1943	Returned to US Navy 5 March 1946, sold, 3 June 1947
Drury	K316	(B)DE-46	Thomas Drury	12 February 1942	24 July 1942	12 April 1943	Returned to US Navy 20 August 1945, scrapped, June 1946
Foley	K474	DE-270	Thomas Foley (Note: Was one of Nelson's band of brothers at the Battle of the Nile)	7 April 1943	19 May 1943	8 September 1943	Returned to US Navy 22 August 1945, scrapped, June 1946
Gardiner	K478	DE-274	Arthur Gardiner	20 May 1943	8 July 1943	28 September 1943	Returned to US Navy 12 February 1946, scrapped, June 1947
Garlies	K475	DE-271	George Stewart, Viscount Garlies	7 April 1943	19 May 1943	13 September 1943	Returned to US Navy 20 August 1945, sold for scrapping, 18 July 1947
Goodall	K479	DE-275	Samuel Goodall	20 May 1943	8 July 1943	4 October 1943	Torpedoed on 29 April 1945; sunk by gunfire from HMS Anguilla (K500) 30 April 1945
Goodson	K480	DE-276	William Goodsonn	20 May 1943	8 July 1943	9 October 1943	Damaged on 26 June 1944 and declared a Constructive Total Loss, returned to US Navy in January 1947
Gore	K481	DE-277	John Gore	20 May 1943	8 July 1943	14 October 1943	Returned to US Navy 2 May 1946, sold for scrapping, 10 June 1947
Gould	K476	DE-272	Davidge Gould	23 April 1943	4 June 1943	18 September 1943	Sunk on 1 March 1944
Grindall	K477	DE-273	Richard Grindall	23 April 1943	4 June 1943	23 September 1943	Returned to US Navy 20 August 1945, sold for scrapping, May 1946
Hoste	K566	DE-521	William Hoste	14 August 1943	24 September 1943	3 December 1943	Returned to US Navy 22 August 1945, sold for scrapping, May 1946
Inglis	K570	DE-525	Charles Inglis	25 September 1943	2 November 1943	12 January 1944	Returned to US Navy 20 March 1946, sold for scrapping, September 1947
Inman	K571	DE-526	Henry Inman	25 September 1943	2 November 1943	13 January 1944	Returned to US Navy 1 March 1946, sold for scrapping
Keats	K482	DE-278	Richard Goodwin Keats	5 June 1943	17 July 1943	19 October 1943	Returned to US Navy 27 February 1946, sold for scrapping, 19 November 1946
Kempthorne	K483	DE-279	John Kempthorne	5 June 1943	17 July 1943	23 October 1943	Returned to US Navy 20 August 1945, sold for scrapping, May 1946
Kingsmill	K484	DE-280	Robert Kingsmill	9 July 1943	13 August 1943	23 October 1943	Returned to US Navy 22 August 1945, sold for scrapping, 17 February 1947
Lawford	K514	DE-516	John Lawford	9 July 1943	13 August 1943	3 November 1943	Sunk on 8 June 1944
Lawson	K516	DE-518	John Lawson	15 July 1943	13 August 1943	25 November 1943	Returned to US Navy 20 March 1946, sold for scrapping, 31 January 1947
Loring	K565	DE-520	John Wentworth Loring	18 July 1943	13 August 1943	15 November 1943	Returned to US Navy 7 January 1947, sold for scrapping, 25 March 1947
Louis	K515	DE-517	Thomas Louis	9 July 1943	13 August 1943	9 November 1943	Returned to US Navy 20 March 1946, sold to Commonwealth of Pennsylvania 17 June 1946
Manners	K568	DE-523	Robert Manners	14 August 1943	24 September 1943	16 December 1943	Damaged on 26 January 1945, declared a Constructive Total Loss and returned to US Navy 8 November 1945, scrapped 1947
Moorsom	K567	DE-522	Robert Moorsom	14 August 1943	24 September 1943	10 December 1943	Returned to US Navy 25 October 1945, sold for scrapping, July 1946
Mounsey	K569	DE-524	William Mounsey	14 August 1943	24 September 1943	23 December 1943	Returned to US Navy 27 February 1945, sold for scrapping, 8 November 1946
Pasley	K564	DE-519	Thomas Pasley	18 July 1943	30 August 1943	15 November 1943	Returned to US Navy 20 August 1945, sold for scrapping, 8 November 1946

=== Buckley group (turbo-electric machinery) ===
The Buckley subclass had turbo-electric machinery. Because of this they were referred to as the TE type. Two Foster Wheeler Express "D"-type water-tube boilers supplied steam to GE 13,500 shp (10,070 kW) steam turbines and generators (9,200 kW). Electric motors for 12,000 shp (8,900 kW) drove the two shafts each fitted with a three-bladed propeller of solid manganese-bronze that was 8.5 feet (2.6 m) in diameter. This all electric drive-train was considered particularly innovative at the time (although the Catherine-class minesweepers had a similar arrangement).

All the electric drive Captains were built by Bethlehem Shipbuilding Corporation.

Ship	Pennant	U.S. hull no.	Namesake	Laid down	Launched	Commissioned	Fate
Affleck	K462	DE-71	Edmund Affleck	5 April 1943	30 June 1943	29 September 1943	Torpedoed on 26 December 1944 remained inactive until returned to US Navy 1 September 1946, sold for scrapping on 24 January 1947.
Aylmer	K463	DE-72	Matthew Aylmer	12 April 1943	10 July 1943	30 September 1943	Returned to US Navy 5 November 1945, sold for scrap, 9 June 1947
Balfour	K464	DE-73	George Balfour	19 April 1943	10 July 1943	7 October 1943	Returned to US Navy 25 October 1945, sold to the State of New York for use by the New York Maritime Academy
Bentinck	K314	DE-52	John Bentinck	29 June 1942	3 February 1943	19 May 1943	Returned to US Navy 5 January 1946, sold to the Northern Metals Co., of Philadelphia, Pa., in June 1946, and scrapped
Bentley	K465	DE-74	John Bentley	26 April 1943	17 July 1943	14 October 1943	Returned to US Navy 5 November 1945, sold for scrap, 17 June 1947
Bickerton	K466	DE-75	Richard Bickerton (Note: Captain at Battle of Ushant)	3 May 1943	24 July 1943	17 October 1943	Torpedoed by U-354 on 22 August 1944; scuttled with torpedoes by the destroyer Vigilant
Bligh	K467	DE-76	William Bligh	10 May 1943	31 July 1943	22 October 1943	Returned to US Navy 12 November 1945, sold for scrap, 13 June 1946
Braithwaite	K468	DE-77	Samuel Braithwaite	10 May 1943	31 July 1943	13 November 1943	Returned to US Navy 13 November 1945, sold for scrap in June 1946
Bullen	K469	DE-78	Charles Bullen	17 May 1943	7 August 1943	25 October 1943	Sunk on 6 December 1944 by U-775
Byard	K315	DE-55	Thomas Byard	15 October 1942	6 March 1943	18 June 1943	Returned to US Navy 12 February 1945, sold for scrap, 1946
Byron	K508	DE-79	John Byron	24 May 1943	14 August 1943	30 October 1943	Returned to US Navy 24 November 1945, sold for scrap, 25 October 1947
Calder	K349	DE-58	Robert Calder	11 December 1942	27 March 1943	15 July 1943	Returned to US Navy 19 October 1945, sold for scrap, 15 January 1948
Conn	K509	DE-80	John Conn	2 June 1943	21 August 1943	31 October 1943	Returned to US Navy 26 November 1945, sold for scrap, 21 January 1948
Cosby	K559	DE-94	Phillips Cosby	11 August 1943	20 October 1943	20 December 1943	Returned to US Navy 4 March 1946, sold for scrap, 5 November 1946
Cotton	K510	DE-81	Charles Cotton	2 June 1943	21 August 1943	8 November 1943	Returned to US Navy 5 November 1956, sold for scrap
Cranstoun	K511	DE-82	James Cranstoun	9 June 1943	28 August 1943	13 November 1943	Returned to US Navy 3 December 1945, sold for scrap
Cubitt	K512	DE-83	J Cubitt	9 June 1943	11 September 1943	17 November 1943	Returned to US Navy 4 March 1946, sold for scrap, 4 March 1947
Curzon	K513	DE-84	Henry Curzon or Edward Curzon	23 June 1943	18 September 1943	20 November 1943	Returned to US Navy 27 March 1946, sold for scrap, 4 November 1946
Dakins	K550	DE-85	George Dakins	23 June 1943	18 September 1943	23 November 1943	Damaged by mine, 25 December 1944 and declared total loss, returned to US Navy in September 1946 and sold for scrap on 9 January 1947
Deane	K551	DE-86	Joseph Deane	30 June 1943	29 September 1943	26 November 1943	Returned to US Navy 4 March 1946, sold for scrap, 7 November 1946
Duckworth	K351	DE-61	John Duckworth	16 January 1943	1 May 1943	4 August 1943	Returned to US Navy 17 December 1945, sold for scrap, 29 May 1946
Duff	K352	DE-64	George Duff	22 February 1943	22 May 1943	23 August 1943	Constructive Total Loss after hitting a mine off the Dutch coast on 30 November 1944, returned to US Navy 1 November 1946, sold for scrap
Ekins	K552	DE-87	Charles Ekins	5 July 1943	2 October 1943	29 November 1943	Damaged by mine, 16 April 1945, declared total loss, returned to US Navy in July 1945 sold for scrap, March 1947
Essington	K353	DE-67	William Essington	15 March 1943	19 June 1943	7 September 1943	Returned to US Navy 19 October 1946, sold for scrap, 22 December 1947
Fitzroy	K553	DE-88	Robert FitzRoy	24 August 1943	1 September 1943	16 October 1943	Returned to US Navy 5 January 1946, sold for scrap, 23 May 1946
Halsted	K556	DE-91	Lawrence Halsted	28 July 1943	14 October 1943	3 November 1943	Damaged on 11 June 1944, declared a total loss, returned to US Navy September 1946 and scrapped from 28 March 1947
Hargood	K582	DE-573	William Hargood	27 October 1943	19 December 1943	7 February 1944	Returned to US Navy 23 February 1946, sold for scrap, March 1947
Holmes	K581	DE-572	Robert Holmes	27 October 1943	19 December 1943	31 January 1944	Returned to US Navy 3 December 1945, sold for scrap, October 1947
Hotham	K583	DE-574	William Hotham	5 November 1943	21 December 1943	8 February 1944	Hotham was returned on 25 April 1952 to the US Navy and simultaneously transferred back to the United Kingdom under the Mutual Defence Assistance Program. The partially stripped vessel was later returned to United States custody on 13 March 1956.
Narborough	K578	DE-569	John Narborough	6 October 1943	27 November 1943	21 January 1944	Returned to US Navy 4 February 1946, sold for scrap, 14 December 1946
Redmill	K554	DE-89	Robert Redmill	14 July 1943	2 October 1943	30 November 1943	Damaged on 27 April 1945, returned to US Navy on 20 January 1947 and scrapped
Retalick	K555	DE-90	Richard Retalick	21 July 1943	9 October 1943	8 December 1943	Returned to US Navy 25 October 1945, sold for scrap, 7 May 1946
Riou	K557	DE-92	Edward Riou	4 August 1943	23 October 1943	14 December 1943	Returned to US Navy 25 February 1946, sold for scrap, 21 April 1947
Rowley	K560	DE-95	Joshua Rowley	18 August 1943	30 October 1943	22 December 1943	Returned to US Navy 12 November 1945, sold for scrap, 14 June 1946
Rupert	K561	DE-96	Prince Rupert	25 August 1943	31 October 1943	24 December 1943	Returned to US Navy 20 March 1946, sold for scrap, 17 June 1946
Rutherford	K558	DE-93	William Gordon Rutherfurd	4 August 1943	23 October 1943	16 December 1943	Returned to US Navy 25 October 1945, sold for scrap, May 1946
Seymour	K563	DE-98	Lord Hugh Seymour	1 September 1943	1 November 1943	23 December 1943	Returned to US Navy 5 January 1946, sold for scrap, 10 December 1946
Spragge	K572	DE-563	Edward Spragge	15 September 1943	16 October 1943	14 January 1944	Returned to US Navy 28 February 1946, sold for scrap, 16 November 1947
Stayner	K573	DE-564	Richard Stayner	22 September 1943	6 November 1943	30 January 1944	Returned to US Navy 24 November 1945, sold for scrap, 14 November 1947
Stockham	K562	DE-97	John Stockham	25 August 1943	31 October 1943	28 December 1943	Returned to US Navy 15 February 1946, sold for scrap
Thornborough	K574	DE-565	Edward Thornbrough	22 September 1943	13 November 1943	31 December 1943	Returned to US Navy 29 April 1947, sold for scrap, 24 April 1947
Torrington	K577	DE-568	George Byng, 1st Viscount Torrington	22 September 1943	27 November 1943	18 January 1944	Returned to US Navy 11 June 1946, sold for scrap, 26 September 1946
Trollope	K575	DE-566	Henry Trollope	29 September 1943	20 November 1943	10 January 1944	Damaged, 6 July 1944, declared total loss, sold for scrap, 1951
Tyler	K576	DE-567	Charles Tyler	6 October 1943	20 November 1943	14 January 1944	Returned to US Navy 12 November 1945, sold for scrap, 23 May 1946
Waldegrave	K579	DE-570	William Waldegrave	16 October 1943	4 December 1943	28 January 1944	Returned to US Navy 3 December 1945, sold for scrap, June 1948
Whitaker	K580	DE-571	Edward Whitaker	20 October 1943	12 December 1943	28 January 1944	Damaged, 1 November 1944, declared total loss, sold for scrap

== See also ==
- List of frigates
- List of frigate classes of the Royal Navy
