= Orme G. Stuart =

Lieutenant Commander Orme G. Stuart, DSC (20 February 1914 – 4 February 1990) was a businessperson and officer with the Royal Canadian Navy.

He served as a reservist in the Royal Canadian Navy before the Second World War and was seconded to the Royal Navy during the war. From February until August 1943, he commanded the Flower-class corvette HMS Pennywort, and in August was transferred to command HMS Abelia.

On 9 January 1944 Commander Stuart's ship encountered a German U-boat while on convoy escort duty, and moved to attack with depth charges. He ordered an increase in speed at 950 yards (870 m) to prevent being torpedoed, not knowing that the U-boat was equipped with T5 torpedoes, for which he would have needed to increase speed at 700 yards (640 m). Abelia was hit and lost her rudder, and the U-boat escaped.

Stuart next commanded the Captain-class frigate HMS Fitzroy, during which time he played a key role in sinking two U-boats. On 27 March 1945 U-722 was sunk near the Hebrides by depth charges from Fitzroy and her sister ships HMS Redmill and HMS Byron. On 8 April 1945, U-1001 was sunk off Land's End by Fitzroy and Byron. For these victories Stuart was awarded the DSC.

After the war, he lived in Prince Rupert, British Columbia and had four children. He also became president of the local Chamber of Commerce. He died in Vancouver in 1990.

== Namesakes ==
- Orme G Stuart, the RCMSAR Type 2 from Station 64 in Prince Rupert

== See also ==
- Convoys HX 229/SC 122
