= Battle of Camperdown order of battle =

List of ships involved in the 1797 naval battle

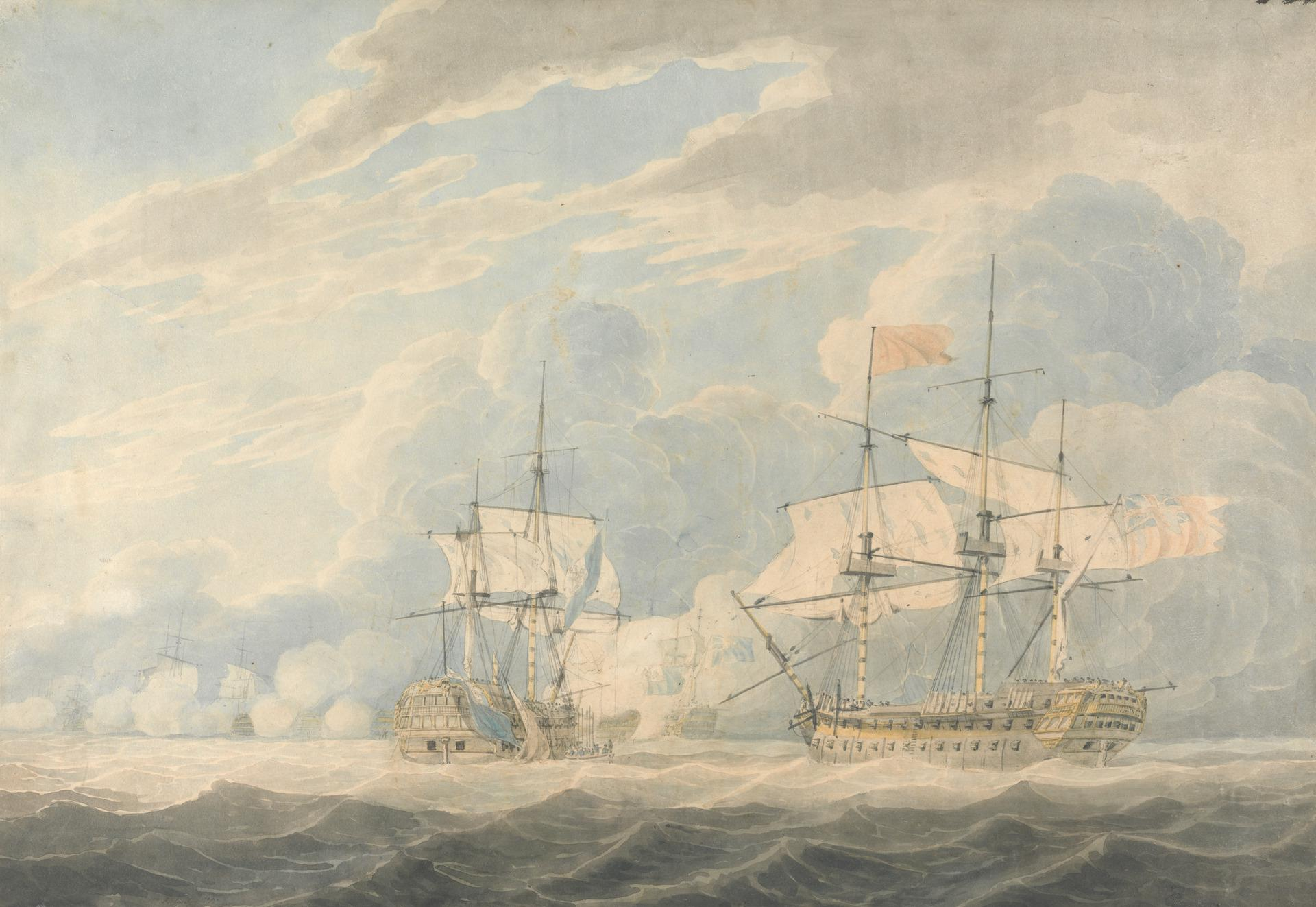
1799 painting of the battle

The Battle of Camperdown was an important naval action of the French Revolutionary Wars, fought off Camperduin on the North Holland coast on 11 October 1797 between a Royal Navy fleet under Admiral Adam Duncan and a Batavian Navy fleet under Vice-Admiral Jan Willem de Winter. France had overrun the Dutch Republic two years earlier, which was replaced by the Batavian Republic. In early 1797, the Batavian Navy was ordered to sail to Brest and unite with the French Atlantic Fleet in preparation for an invasion of Ireland. Shortly afterwards, the British navy was paralysed by the Spithead and Nore mutinies, in which the navy's sailors refused to take their ships to sea until they were awarded better pay and conditions. For two months the English Channel was undefended, but the Batavian navy failed to take the opportunity to sail from their harbour in the Texel as their preparations were not complete; furthermore, a small squadron of loyal ships under Duncan convinced de Winter that the British navy was at sea by sending nonsensical signals to fictitious ships over the horizon.

By October 1797, the plan to invade Ireland had been abandoned and the British North Sea Fleet was again at full strength. During a brief period replenishing supplies at Yarmouth, news reached Duncan on 10 October that de Winter had set sail with his fleeton a raiding cruise and he returned to the Dutch coast, intercepting the Batavian fleet on its way back to the Texel. The Batavians formed a line of battle in shallow coastal waters to meet Duncan's attack, which was conducted in a confused mass, the British fleet separating into two groups that struck the vanguard and rear of the Batavian fleet, overwhelming each in turn and capturing eleven ships, including de Winter's flagship Vrijheid. On the return journey, three of the captured ships were lost, and none of the surviving prizes were ever suitable for active service again. Both sides suffered heavy casualties during the battle as each fleet had been trained to aim at the hulls of their opponents, maximising the damage to personnel.

Although the sailors of both fleets fought hard, they were suffering from popular unrest; the mutinies in Spithead and Nore continued to overshadow the Royal Navy, while the Batavian Navy's sailors were unhappy with the new pro-French regime and in marked difference to their officers were generally supporters of the exiled House of Orange. Additionally, Batavian sailors were disaffected and poorly trained due to the long months they had spent being blockaded in their harbours by the Royal Navy, which made them inferior seamen and gunners in contrast to the highly experienced crews of the British navy. Furthermore, the ships of the Batavian navy, many of which had been part of the former Dutch States Navy, were more weakly constructed than their British counterparts with a shallower draught, a necessity in the shallow waters of the Dutch coast but a liability when fighting warships built for the open ocean. De Winter's fleet did, however, have the advantage of weight of shot, especially so with its well-armed frigates and brigs. Unlike their British equivalents, these lighter craft were intended to contribute in battle, covering the gaps in the line between their larger companions.

== Orders of battle ==
The ships in the orders of battle below are listed in the order in which they appeared in the respective battle lines. Listed in the casualties section are the totals of killed and wounded as best as can be established: due to the nature of the battle, Dutch losses were hard to calculate precisely. Officers killed in action or who subsequently died of wounds received are marked with a † symbol. As carronades were not traditionally taken into consideration when calculating a ship's rate, these ships may have actually been carrying additional or fewer guns than indicated below.

- * Ships in this colour were captured during the battle

=== British fleet ===
Admiral Duncan's fleet
Ship	Rate	Guns	Commander	Casualties			Notes
Ship	Rate	Guns	Commander	Killed	Wounded	Total	Notes
Windward division
HMS Triumph	Third-rate	74	Captain William Essington	29	55	84	Hull and masts damaged, ten guns dismounted
HMS Venerable	Third-rate	74	Admiral Adam Duncan; Captain William George Fairfax	15	62	77	Hull and masts very badly damaged
HMS Ardent	Third-rate	64	Captain Richard Rundle Burges †	41	107	148	Hull and masts very badly damaged
HMS Bedford	Third-rate	74	Captain Sir Thomas Byard	30	41	71	Hull and rigging badly damaged
HMS Lancaster	Third-rate	64	Captain John Wells	3	18	21	Lightly damaged
HMS Belliqueux	Third-rate	64	Captain John Inglis	25	78	103	Hull and rigging badly damaged
HMS Adamant	Fourth-rate	50	Captain William Hotham	0	0	0	Undamaged
HMS Isis	Fourth-rate	50	Captain William Mitchell	2	21	23	Lightly damaged
HMS Circe	Sixth-rate	28	Captain Peter Halkett	0	0	0	Not engaged in the action.
Leeward division
HMS Russell	Third-rate	74	Captain Henry Trollope	0	7	7	Lightly damaged
HMS Director	Third-rate	64	Captain William Bligh	0	7	7	Masts and rigging damaged
HMS Montagu	Third-rate	74	Captain John Knight	3	5	8	Lightly damaged
HMS Veteran	Third-rate	64	Captain George Gregory	4	21	25	Three guns dismounted, otherwise lightly damaged
HMS Monarch	Third-rate	74	Vice-Admiral Richard Onslow; Captain Edward O'Bryen	36	100	136	Hull and masts very badly damaged
HMS Powerful	Third-rate	74	Captain William O'Bryen Drury	10	78	88	Hull and masts badly damaged
HMS Monmouth	Third-rate	64	Captain James Walker	5	22	27	Lightly damaged
HMS Agincourt	Third-rate	64	Captain John Williamson	0	0	0	Very lightly damaged
HMS Beaulieu	Fifth-rate	40	Captain Francis Fayerman	0	0	0	Undamaged
Minor warships
HMS Martin	Ship-sloop	16	Commander Charles Paget	0	0	0	Not engaged in the action.
Rose	Hired cutter	10	Lieutenant Joseph Brodie	0	0	0	Not engaged in the action.
King George	Hired cutter	12	Lieutenant James Rains	0	0	0	Not engaged in the action.
Active	Hired cutter	12	Lieutenant J. Hamilton	0	0	0	Not engaged in the action.
Diligent	Hired cutter	6	Lieutenant T. Dawson	0	0	0	Not engaged in the action.
Speculator	Hired lugger	8	Lieutenant H. Hales	0	0	0	Not engaged in the action.
Total casualties: 203 killed, 622 wounded

=== Batavian fleet ===
Vice-Admiral de Winter's fleet
Line of battle
Ship	Ship type	Guns	Commander	Casualties			Notes
Ship	Ship type	Guns	Commander	Killed	Wounded	Total	Notes
Gelijkheid *	Ship of the line	68	Commander H. A. Ruijsch	40 killed			Badly damaged and may have been dismasted. Captured at 15:10, later became HMS Gelykheid
Beschermer	Ship of the line	56	Captain-at-sea Dooitze Eelkes Hinxt †	Unknown			Lightly damaged
Hercules *	Ship of the line	64	Commander Ruijsoort	Unknown			Hull very badly damaged and set on fire, mizzenmast collapsed. Captured and became HMS Delft.
Admiraal Tjerk Hiddes De Vries *	Ship of the line	68	Captain-at-sea J. B. Zegers	Unknown			Badly damaged and ship may have been dismasted. Captured at 15:00, later became HMS Devries
Vrijheid *	Ship of the line	74	Vice-Admiral Jan Willem de Winter; Commander L. W. van Rossum †	58	98	156	Hull very badly damaged and ship dismasted. Captured at 15:15, later became HMS Vryheid
Staaten Generaal	Ship of the line	74	Schout-bij-nacht Samuel Story	20	40	60	Hull badly damaged, masts and rigging lightly damaged
Wassenaar *	Ship of the line	64	Commander A. Holland	Unknown			Damaged. First captured at 14:00, subsequently rejoined the combat and was captured again. Later became HMS Wassenaer
Batavier	Ship of the line	56	Commander Souter	Unknown			Lightly damaged
Brutus	Ship of the line	74	Schout-bij-nacht Johan Arnold Bloys van Treslong; Commodore Polders	10	50	60	Lightly damaged
Leijden	Ship of the line	68	Commander J. D. Musquetier	Unknown			Lightly damaged
Mars	Razee	44	Commander D. H. Kolff	1	14	15	Mizzenmast collapsed
Cerberus	Ship of the line	68	Commander Jacobsen	5	9	14	Lightly damaged
Jupiter *	Ship of the line	72	Schout-bij-nacht Hermanus Reijntjes †	61 killed			Hull and rigging severely damaged, main and mizzenmasts collapsed. Captured at 13:45, later became HMS Camperdown
Haarlem *	Ship of the line	68	Captain-at-sea O. Wiggerts	Heavy casualties			Hull severely damaged and mizzenmast collapsed. Captured at 13:15, later became HMS Haerlem
Alkmaar *	Ship of the line	56	Captain-at-sea J. W. Krafft	26	62	82	Hull severely damaged and ship dismasted in the immediate aftermath of the battle. Captured at 14:30, later became HMS Alkmaar.
Delft *	Ship of the line	56	Captain-at-sea Gerrit Verdooren van Asperen	43	76	119	Hull severely damaged. Captured at 14:15. Sank during journey to Britain with the loss of an additional 34 lives.
Frigate line
Atalante	Brig	18	Commander B. Pletsz	Unknown			
Heldin	Frigate	32	Commander Johan Ferdinand Dumesnil de l'Estrille	Unknown			
Galathée	Brig	18	Commander Riverij	Unknown			
Minerva	Frigate	24	Commander Eijlbracht	Unknown			
Ajax	Brig	18	Lieutenant Arkenbout	Unknown			
Waakzaamheid	Frigate	24	Commander Meindert van Nierop	Unknown			
Ambuscade *	Frigate	36	Commander J. Huijs	Unknown			Captured but later driven ashore on the Dutch coast and retaken by Batavian forces
Daphné	Brig	18	Lieutenant Frederiks	Unknown			Badly damaged
Monnikkendam *	Frigate	44	Commander Thomas Lancaster	50 killed			Badly damaged. Captured at 14:00 but subsequently wrecked on the Dutch coast
Haasje	Advice boat	6	Lieutenant Hartingveld	Unknown			
Total casualties: 540 killed, 620 wounded

== Bibliography ==
- Clowes, William Laird (1997) [1899]. The Royal Navy, A History from the Earliest Times to 1900, Volume IV. Chatham Publishing. ISBN 1-86176-013-2.
- Gardiner, Robert, ed. (2001) [1996]. Fleet Battle and Blockade. Caxton Editions. ISBN 1-84067-363-X.
- James, William (2002) [1827]. The Naval History of Great Britain, Volume 2, 1797–1799. Conway Maritime Press. ISBN 0-85177-906-9.
- Lloyd, Christopher (1963). St Vincent & Camperdown. London: B. T. Batsford Ltd.
- Padfield, Peter (2000) [1976]. Nelson's War. Wordsworth Military Library. ISBN 1-84022-225-5.
- Pakenham, Thomas (2000) [1997]. The Year of Liberty: The Story of the Great Irish Rebellion of 1798. London: Abacus. ISBN 978-0-349-11252-7.
