= HMS Dacres =

Frigate of the Royal Navy

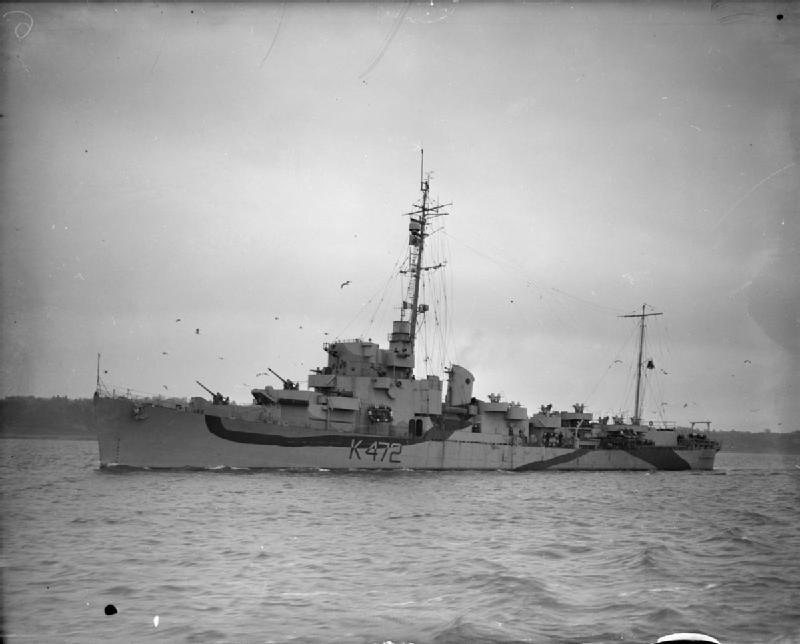

History

United Kingdom
- Name: Dacres
- Builder: Boston Navy Yard
- Laid down: 7 April 1943
- Launched: 19 May 1943
- Commissioned: 28 August 1943
- Fate: Returned to US Navy, 26 January 1946; Sold for scrapping, 14 December 1946

General characteristics
- Type: Captain-class frigate
- Displacement: 1,140 long tons (1,158 t)
- Length: 289 ft 5 in (88.21 m)
- Beam: 35 ft 1 in (10.69 m)
- Draught: 10 ft 6 in (3.20 m)
- Propulsion: 4 × General Motors Model 16-278A diesel engines with electric drive, 6,000 shp (4,474 kW); 2 screws
- Speed: 20 knots (37 km/h; 23 mph)
- Range: 5,000 nmi (9,300 km) at 15 knots (28 km/h; 17 mph)
- Complement: 156
- Armament: 3 × single 3"/50 Mk.22 dual purpose guns; 1 × twin 40 mm AA gun; 10 × 20 mm AA guns; 1 × Hedgehog anti-submarine mortar; 4 × depth charge projectors; 2 × depth charge tracks

HMS Dacres (K472) was a Captain-class frigate, built in the United States as a Evarts-class destroyer escort, and transferred to the Royal Navy under the terms of Lend-Lease, which served in World War II.

The ship was laid down as Duffy (DE-268) on 7 April 1943 by the Boston Navy Yard, Boston, Massachusetts, and launched on 19 May 1943. Transferred to the Royal Navy and commissioned as Dacres on 28 August 1943, the ship was named after Vice Admiral James Richard Dacres (1749–1810).

== Service history ==
Dacres was attached to the B4 Escort Group based at Belfast, which comprised three destroyers and two Captain-class frigates (Foley and Bayntun), and carried out escort duties in the Atlantic.

Dacres was one of three Captain-class ships (along with Kingsmill and Lawford) selected for conversion to headquarters ships for use during "Operation Neptune" – the invasion of France. Her aft three-inch (76 mm) gun and all the depth charge gear was removed and the superstructure extended to provide accommodation for extra staff officers; two deck houses were built for communications equipment and a small main mast added to support more aerials. Four more 20 mm Oerlikons were fitted, and a number of radar sets installed. For the invasion Dacres sailed from Portsmouth, even though her forward motor room had flooded, which compelled her to sail on only one engine.

As the Allied forces moved inland the staff officers were transferred ashore, and Dacres joined Kingsmill in patrolling the Normandy anchorage until August, when she sailed for Portsmouth, salvaging an abandoned Liberty ship on the way. At Portsmouth dockyard she was stripped of the additional superstructure and guns, and restored to working order, before returning to Belfast in early 1945 to join the 10th Escort Group. In April 1945 she was transferred to the 15th Escort Group until Victory in Europe Day, after which she was put into reserve until returned to the United States Navy on 26 January 1946. Dacres was sold for scrapping on 14 December 1946.

== See also ==
- List of destroyer escorts of the United States Navy
- List of Captain class frigates
- List of Allied warships in the Normandy landings
