= Retalick =

Retalick may refer to:

- Richard Retalick ( (died 1803), British naval officer
- HMS Retalick (K555), British frigate which served in the Royal Navy from 1943 to 1945
