= Narborough =

Narborough may refer to:

== People ==
- John Narborough (c. 1640–1688), British rear admiral

== Places ==
- Narborough, Leicestershire, England
  - Narborough Hall
  - Narborough Road, Leicester
- Narborough, Norfolk, England
- Narborough, Northamptonshire, a historical name for Northborough, Cambridgeshire, England

== Other uses ==
- HMS Narborough, two ships of the Royal Navy and one planned one, named after Sir John Narborough
