= Riou =

Riou is a common family name from Brittany, in France:

Riou may refer to:

People

- Edward Riou (1762–1801), British naval officer
- Édouard Riou (1833–1900), Breton French painter
- Jakez Riou (1899–1937), Breton French writer
- André Riou (1918–2005), French footballer (soccer player)
- Bernadette Perrin-Riou (born 1955), French number theorist
- Jean-Pierre Riou (b. 1963), Breton French musician and songwriter, leader of Red Cardell
- Vincent Riou (born 1972), French sailor
- Rudy Riou (born 1980), French footballer (soccer player)
- Marie Riou (born 981), French sailor
- Rémy Riou (born 1987), French footballer (soccer player)
- Panuga Riou (born 1992), English badminton player
- Alan Riou (born 1997), French cyclist
- Matthis Riou (born 2001), French footballer (soccer player)

Places

- several small rivers in France
- Île de Riou, an island near Marseille, France

Ships

- HMS Riou (K557), a British frigate in commission in the Royal Navy from 1943 to 1945

Other

- Riou (Suikoden), the name given to the protagonist in the Japanese novelization and radio drama adaptation of the video game Suikoden II
