= List of Allied warships in the Normandy landings =

This is a list of warships which took part in the Normandy landings on June 6, 1944.

== Battleships ==
Seven battleships took part: four British and three US:

- USS Arkansas, eastern Omaha Beach (Wyoming class, 26,100 tons, main armament: twelve 12" guns) primarily in support of the US 29th Infantry Division.
- USS Nevada, Utah Beach (Nevada class, 29,000 tons, main armament: ten 14" guns).
- HMS Ramillies (1915, Revenge class, 36,125 tons, main armament: eight 15-inch guns).
- HMS Rodney (1925, Nelson-class, 45,500 tons, main armament: nine 16-inch guns).
- USS Texas, western Omaha Beach (New York class, 27,000 tons, main armament: ten 14-inch guns, Flagship of Rear Admiral Carleton F. Bryant) primarily in support of the US 1st Infantry Division.
- HMS Warspite (1913, Queen Elizabeth class, 38,700 tons, main armament eight 15-inch guns, only six operational).

In addition HMS Nelson (Nelson class main armament: nine 16-inch guns) was held in reserve until June 10.

== Heavy cruisers ==
Five heavy cruisers (main guns of 8 inches) took part, three from the United States and two from Britain, HMS Hawkins had her original armament of seven 7.5-inch guns while HMS Frobisher's main gun armament had been reduced from seven to five single-mounted 7.5-inch guns.

- USS Augusta (Flagship of Rear Admiral Alan Kirk – Lt. General Omar Bradley embarked)
- HMS Frobisher
- HMS Hawkins
- USS Quincy
- USS Tuscaloosa

== Light cruisers ==
17 British light cruisers took part along with two of the Free French navy, and one of the Polish navy. All carried either 6- or 5.25-inch guns of varying numbers.

- HMS Argonaut
- HMS Ajax
- HMS Arethusa
- HMS Belfast (Flagship of Rear Admiral Frederick Dalrymple-Hamilton)
- HMS Bellona - also carried jamming equipment against radio controlled bombs
- HMS Black Prince
- HMS Capetown
- HMS Ceres (Flagship of U.S. Service Force)
- HMS Danae
- HMS Diadem
- ORP Dragon (Polish, damaged in July and then used as a blockship in "Gooseberry" breakwater)
- HMS Emerald
- HMS Enterprise
- Georges Leygues (Free French)
- HMS Glasgow
- HMS Mauritius (Flagship of Rear Admiral Patterson)
- Montcalm (Free French, Flagship of Rear Admiral Jaujard)
- HMS Orion (which fired the first shell of the coastal bombardment)
- HMS Scylla (Rear Admiral Philip Vian's flagship, mined and seriously damaged, out of action until after the war)
- HMS Sirius In reserve until June 10

== Destroyers and escorts ==
139 ships (eighty-five British and Dominion, 40 US, 10 Free French and 7 other Allied):

- HMCS Alberni (Canadian)
- HMCS Algonquin (Canadian)
- USS Amesbury
- USS Baldwin
- USS Barton
- HMS Beagle
- HMS Bleasdale
- ORP Błyskawica
- HMS Boadicea (torpedoed and sunk 13 June)
- HMCS Cape Breton (Canadian)
- USS Carmick
- HMS Cattistock
- HMCS Chaudiere (Canadian)
- USS Corry (sunk during the invasion)
- HMS Cottesmore
- USS Doyle
- HMS Eglinton
- USS Emmons
- HMS Faulknor
- USS Fitch
- USS Frankford
- HMS Fury (mined 21 June and not repaired)
- USS Glennon (hit by mine 8 June, sunk by German artillery 10 June)
- USS Hulbert
- HNoMS Glaisdale (Norwegian)
- HMS Grenville
- HMCS Haida (Canadian)
- USS Harding
- USS Herndon
- USS Hobson
- USS Jeffers (DD-621)
- HMS Jervis
- HMS Kelvin
- HMS Kempenfelt
- HMCS Kitchener (Canadian)
- ORP Krakowiak, (Polish, former HMS Silverton)
- La Combattante (Free French, former HMS Haldon)
- USS Laffey
- HMS Loyalty
- USS Maloy
- USS McCook
- HMS Melbreak
- HMS Middleton
- USS Murphy
- USS O'Brien
- HMS Pytchley
- HMS Pelican (L86)
- HMCS Regina (Canadian)
- USS Rich (sunk by mines 10 June)
- USS Rodman
- USS Satterlee
- HMS Saumarez
- HMS Scorpion
- HMS Scourge
- HMS Serapis
- USS Shubrick
- HMCS Sioux (Canadian)
- ORP Ślązak (Polish)
- HMS Stevenstone
- HNoMS Stord (Norwegian)
- HNoMS Svenner (Norwegian, hit by German torpedo and sunk off Normandy at dawn, 6 June) (Note: Investigations indicate that the Svenner may have been hit by an early version of a German anti-shipping missile (possibly a Fritz X), instead of the more usual attribution of a torpedo from the German large torpedo boast Jaguar or Mowe or T28 based at Le Havre. There have also been reports of German bombers releasing long, torpedo-like bombs, but from a very long distance, no way near firing-range. The most likely, though, is that it was hit by a torpedo, but accounts point in either direction.)
- HMS Swift (mined and sunk 24 June 1944 off Normandy)
- HMS Talybont
- HMS Tanatside
- USS Thompson
- HMS Ulster
- HMS Ulysses
- HMS Undaunted
- HMS Undine
- HMS Urania
- HMS Urchin
- HMS Ursa
- HMS Venus
- HMS Verulam
- HMS Vigilant
- HMS Virago
- HMS Wanderer
- HMS Wallflower
- HMS Whimbrel
- HMS Wrestler (damaged by a mine and not repaired)
- RHN Kriezis Royal Hellenic Navy (Greece) (Note: Flower-class corvette ex HMS Coreopsis (K32))
- RHN Tombazis Royal Hellenic Navy (Greece) (Note: Flower-class corvette ex HMS Tamarisk (K216))
- Frigate La Surprise (Free French)
- Frigate L'Escarmouche (Free French)
- Frigate La Découverte (Free French)
- Frigate L'Aventure (Free French)
- Corvette Aconit (Free French)
- Corvette La Renoncule (Free French)
- Corvette La Roselys (Free French)
- Corvette d'Estienne d'Orves (Free French)
- Submarine-hunter Benodet (Free French)

== Monitors ==
- HMS Erebus, monitor with two 15-inch guns
- HMS Roberts, monitor with two 15-inch guns

== Troop transports ==
- USS Joseph T. Dickman, attack transport
- USS Samuel Chase, attack transport operated by the US Coast Guard
- USS Charles Carroll, attack transport
- USS Bayfield, attack transport
- USS Henrico, attack transport

== Other warships ==
508 ships (352 British, 154 US and 2 other Allied):

- HMS Lark Modified Black Swan class Sloop - Convoy escort from Thames Estuary Spithead onward to Eastern Task Force Area / Beachhead Convoy ETP1
- HMS Bulolo, Landing Ship Headquarters (LSH) for Gold Beach carrying tri-service commanders and staff
- HMS Centurion, old battleship sunk as a blockship to form part of "Gooseberry" breakwater of the Mulberry harbour on Sword beach
- Courbet, Free Naval French Forces, former battleship, sunk as a blockship in "Gooseberry" breakwater on Sword beach
- Forbin, Free Naval French Forces, patrol boat, sunk as an artificial dike in "Arromanches" on Gold Beach
- HMCS Cowichan, Canadian minesweeper
- HMS Dacres, Captain class frigate converted to act as a headquarters ship
- HMS Durban (light cruiser used as a blockship in "Gooseberry" breakwater)
- HNLMS Flores, Dutch gunboat
- HMS Hilary, H.Q. ship for Juno Beach carrying tri-service commanders and staff
- HMS Kingsmill, Captain class frigate converted to act as a headquarters ship
- HMS Largs, H.Q. ship for Sword Beach carrying tri-service commanders and staff
- HNLMS Soemba, Dutch gunboat
- HMS Lawford, Captain class frigate converted to act as a headquarters ship (bombed and sunk)
- HNoMS Nordkapp, Norwegian patrol boat
- HNLMS Sumatra (Dutch, decommissioned due to crew shortages and losing her guns to HNLMS Flores and Soemba, used as blockship in "Gooseberry" breakwater)

The British 9th and 159th minesweeping flotillas and U.S. 7th Minesweeping Squadron provided minesweeping protection.

A distant anti-submarine screen to the operation was provided by HMS Onslow, Offa, Onslaught, Oribi, Melbreak and Brissenden. Additional protection from E-boats was provided by Motor Gun Boat flotillas.

== Support ==
- HMS Boxer - fighter direction ship
- HMS Bruiser - fighter direction ship

== See also ==
- List of Allied vessels involved in Operation Neptune
- List of ships of Force U Bombardment Group
