= K184 =

K184 or K-184 may refer to:

- K-184 (Kansas highway), a state highway in Kansas
- HMS Abelia (K184), a former UK Royal Navy ship
