= German submarine U-722 =

German World War II submarine

History

Nazi Germany
- Name: U-722
- Ordered: 25 August 1941
- Builder: H. C. Stülcken Sohn, Hamburg
- Yard number: 788
- Laid down: 21 December 1942
- Launched: 21 September 1943
- Commissioned: 15 December 1943
- Fate: Sunk on 27 March 1945

General characteristics
- Class & type: Type VIIC submarine
- Displacement: 769 tonnes (757 long tons) surfaced; 871 t (857 long tons) submerged
- Length: 67.10 m (220 ft 2 in) o/a; 50.50 m (165 ft 8 in) pressure hull
- Beam: 6.20 m (20 ft 4 in) o/a; 4.70 m (15 ft 5 in) pressure hull
- Draught: 4.74 m (15 ft 7 in)
- Installed power: 2,800–3,200 PS (2,100–2,400 kW; 2,800–3,200 bhp) (diesels); 750 PS (550 kW; 740 shp) (electric)
- Propulsion: 2 shafts; 2 × diesel engines; 2 × electric motors
- Speed: 17.7 knots (32.8 km/h; 20.4 mph) surfaced; 7.6 knots (14.1 km/h; 8.7 mph) submerged
- Range: 8,500 nmi (15,700 km; 9,800 mi) at 10 knots (19 km/h; 12 mph) surfaced; 80 nmi (150 km; 92 mi) at 4 knots (7.4 km/h; 4.6 mph) submerged
- Test depth: 230 m (750 ft); Crush depth: 250–295 m (820–968 ft)
- Complement: 4 officers, 40–56 enlisted
- Armament: 5 × 53.3 cm (21 in) torpedo tubes (4 bow, 1 stern); 14 × torpedoes; 1 × 8.8 cm (3.46 in) deck gun (220 rounds); 1 × twin 2 cm (0.79 in) C/30 anti-aircraft gun

Service record
- Part of: 31st U-boat Flotilla; 15 December 1943 – 31 July 1944; 1st U-boat Flotilla; 1 August – 30 September 1944; 11th U-boat Flotilla; 1 October 1944 – 27 March 1945
- Identification codes: M 54 762
- Commanders: Oblt.z.S. Hans-Heinrich Reimers; 15 December 1943 – 27 March 1945
- Operations: 3 patrols: 1st patrol: 16 October – 20 November 1944; 2nd patrol: 7 – 29 December 1944; 3rd patrol: 21 February – 27 March 1945
- Victories: 1 merchant ship sunk (2,190 GRT)

German submarine U-722 was a Type VIIC U-boat built for Nazi Germany's Kriegsmarine for service during World War II. She was laid down on 21 December 1942 by H. C. Stülcken Sohn, Hamburg as yard number 788, launched on 21 September 1943 and commissioned on 15 December 1943 under Leutnant zur See Hans-Heinrich Reimers.

== Design ==
German Type VIIC submarines were preceded by the shorter Type VIIB submarines. U-722 had a displacement of 769 tonnes (757 long tons) when at the surface and 871 tonnes (857 long tons) while submerged. She had a total length of 67.10 m (220 ft 2 in), a pressure hull length of 50.50 m (165 ft 8 in), a beam of 6.20 m (20 ft 4 in), a height of 9.60 m (31 ft 6 in), and a draught of 4.74 m (15 ft 7 in). The submarine was powered by two Germaniawerft F46 four-stroke, six-cylinder supercharged diesel engines producing a total of 2,800 to 3,200 metric horsepower (2,060 to 2,350 kW; 2,760 to 3,160 shp) for use while surfaced, two AEG GU 460/8–27 double-acting electric motors producing a total of 750 metric horsepower (550 kW; 740 shp) for use while submerged. She had two shafts and two 1.23 m (4 ft) propellers. The boat was capable of operating at depths of up to 230 metres (750 ft).

The submarine had a maximum surface speed of 17.7 knots (32.8 km/h; 20.4 mph) and a maximum submerged speed of 7.6 knots (14.1 km/h; 8.7 mph). When submerged, the boat could operate for 80 nautical miles (150 km; 92 mi) at 4 knots (7.4 km/h; 4.6 mph); when surfaced, she could travel 8,500 nautical miles (15,700 km; 9,800 mi) at 10 knots (19 km/h; 12 mph). U-722 was fitted with five 53.3 cm (21 in) torpedo tubes (four fitted at the bow and one at the stern), fourteen torpedoes, one 8.8 cm (3.46 in) SK C/35 naval gun, 220 rounds, and one twin 2 cm (0.79 in) C/30 anti-aircraft gun. The boat had a complement of between forty-four and sixty.

== Service history ==
The boat's career began with training at 31st U-boat Flotilla on 15 December 1943, followed by active service on 1 August 1944 as part of the 1st Flotilla. When the situation deteriorated for the Germans in France, following the invasion, she transferred to 11th Flotilla in Norway for the remainder of her service.

In three patrols she sank one merchant ship, for a total of 2,190 gross register tons (GRT).

=== Wolfpacks ===
U-722 took part in no wolfpacks.

=== Fate ===
U-722 was sunk on 27 March 1945 in the North Atlantic near the Hebrides, Scotland in position 57°09′N 06°55′W, by depth charges from British frigates HMS Fitzroy, HMS Redmill and HMS Byron. All hands were lost.

== Summary of raiding history ==
Date	Ship Name	Nationality	Tonnage (GRT)	Fate
16 March 1945	Inger Toft	United Kingdom	2,190	Sunk

== See also ==
- Lt/Cdr Orme G. Stuart DSC RCNVR

== Bibliography ==
- Busch, Rainer; Röll, Hans-Joachim (1999). German U-boat commanders of World War II : a biographical dictionary. Translated by Brooks, Geoffrey. London, Annapolis, Md: Greenhill Books, Naval Institute Press. ISBN 1-55750-186-6.
- Busch, Rainer; Röll, Hans-Joachim (1999). Der U-Boot-Krieg, 1939-1945: Deutsche U-Boot-Verluste von September 1939 bis Mai 1945 [German U-boat losses from September 1939 to May 1945] (in German). Vol. IV. Hamburg, Berlin, Bonn: Mittler. ISBN 3-8132-0514-2.
- Gröner, Eric; Jung, Dieter; Maass, Martin (1991). German Warships 1815-1945: U-boats and Mine Warfare Vessels. Vol. 2. Translated by Thomas, Keith; Magowan, Rachel. London: Conway Maritime Press. ISBN 0-85177-593-4.
- Sharpe, Peter (1998). U-Boat Fact File. Great Britain: Midland Publishing. ISBN 1-85780-072-9.
