= HMS Narborough =

Two ships of the Royal Navy have borne the name HMS Narborough, after Rear-Admiral Sir John Narborough. A third was planned, but renamed shortly before being launched:

- HMS Narborough was to have been a Talisman-class destroyer, originally built for the Turkish Navy but taken over as HMS Narborough, later renamed HMS Termagant and launched in 1915. She was sold in 1921.
- HMS Narborough (1916) was an Admiralty M-class destroyer launched in 1916 and wrecked in 1918.
- HMS Narborough (K578) was a Captain-class frigate launched in 1943 under lend-lease, and returned to the US Navy in 1946.
