= HMS Cubitt =

Frigate of the Royal Navy

History

United Kingdom
- Name: HMS Cubitt
- Builder: Bethlehem-Hingham Shipyard, Hingham, Massachusetts
- Laid down: 9 June 1943
- Launched: 11 September 1943
- Commissioned: 17 November 1943
- Decommissioned: 4 March 1946
- Stricken: 12 April 1946
- Honours and awards: Atlantic; North Foreland; North Sea
- Fate: Sold for scrapping, 7 March 1947

General characteristics
- Class & type: Captain-class frigate
- Displacement: 1,400 long tons (1,422 t) standard; 1,740 long tons (1,768 t) full
- Length: 306 ft (93 m) o/a; 300 ft (91 m) w/l
- Beam: 36 ft 9 in (11.20 m)
- Draught: 9 ft (2.7 m)
- Propulsion: 2 × Foster Wheeler Express "D"-type water-tube boilers; GE 13,500 shp (10,067 kW) steam turbines and generators (9,200 kW); Electric motors 12,000 shp (8,948 kW); 2 shafts
- Speed: 24 knots (44 km/h; 28 mph)
- Range: 5,500 nmi (10,200 km) at 15 kn (28 km/h; 17 mph)
- Complement: 186
- Electronic warfare & decoys: SA & SL type radars; Type 144 series Asdic; MF Direction Finding antenna; HF Direction Finding Type FH 4 antenna
- Armament: 3 × 3 in (76 mm) /50 Mk.22 guns; 1 × twin Bofors 40 mm mount Mk.I; 7–16 × 20 mm Oerlikon guns; Mark 10 Hedgehog anti-submarine mortar; Depth charges; QF 2-pounder naval gun

Service record
- Part of: 21st Escort Group
- Commanders: Lt. George Denys Gregory, RN

HMS Cubitt (K512) was a Captain-class frigate of the British Royal Navy that served during World War II. The ship was laid down as a Buckley-class destroyer escort at the Bethlehem-Hingham Shipyard at Hingham, Massachusetts on 9 June 1943, with the hull number DE-83, and launched on 11 September 1943. The ship was transferred to the UK under Lend-Lease on 17 November 1943, and named after Captain J. Cubitt, a Navy officer who commanded the frigate Mary Rose in 1661.

== Service history ==
Cubitt was assigned to Nore Command, serving in the 21st Escort Group based at Harwich. She did not take part in the Normandy landings on 6 June 1944, but was afterwards deployed escorting convoys to and from the landing beaches. Towards the end of 1944 Cubitt became a Coastal Forces Control Frigate (CFCF), controlling a flotilla of Motor Torpedo Boats operating in the Channel and North Sea to counter the threat of enemy E-Boats.

On 29 January 1945 Cubitt was on patrol with HMS Caicos and three MTBs, the Caicos signalled contact with two groups of E-boats. Lt Cmdr Gregory ordered Caicos to take on the group to the north and turned Cubitt with his MTBs to engage the other group. The seas that night were choppy and the MTBs found themselves speed restricted to 20 knots, a clear 10 knots slower than the E-boats. Five miles behind their target Gregory decided to leave behind the slower MTBs and took off to engage the E-boats alone. Managing to close to just a mile away, his enemy closed on a minefield into which it could retreat. Gregory’s gunners’ visibility was still hugely impaired and Cubitt was forced to send up flares for a last ditch barrage. The E-boats, warned by the light, veered away: declining the challenge for a fight. Gregory was described in reports as ‘stamping in fury’ at their refusal to engage. Cubitt’s forward gunners fired off twelve rounds before losing range.

In February 1945 Cubitt was refitted at Tilbury. Her 2-pounder "pom pom" bow chaser was removed, the two 20 mm Oerlikons mounted in front of the bridge were replaced with two single 40 mm Bofors, and splinter shields were fitted to her 3-inch (76 mm) guns.

On the night of 7/8 April 1945 Cubitt and Rutherford were on patrol with their MTB's when Cubitt encountered a large group of E-Boats. A Motor Gun Boat and an E-Boat collided, and Cubitt picked up casualties from another MGB that was on fire.

Cubitt visited several Dutch ports immediately after they were liberated, and after VE Day escorted ships to Oslo and Brunsbüttel. Cubitt was then assigned to "Operation Deadlight", towing surrendered U-boats from Loch Ryan out into the North Atlantic where they were sunk.

Cubitt was returned to the U.S. Navy on 4 March 1946, struck from the Navy List on 12 April 1946, and sold for scrapping on 7 March 1947.
