= HMS Rutherford =

Frigate of the Royal Navy

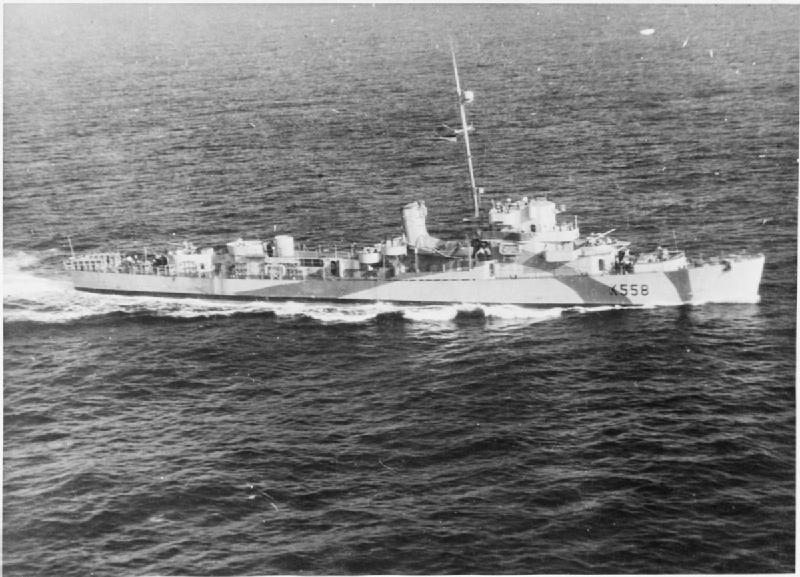
- HMS Rutherford underway during World War II.

History

United States
- Name: unnamed (DE-93)
- Ordered: 10 January 1942
- Builder: Bethlehem-Hingham Shipyard, Hingham, Massachusetts
- Laid down: 4 August 1943
- Launched: 23 October 1943
- Completed: 16 December 1943
- Fate: Transferred to United Kingdom 16 December 1943
- Acquired: Returned by United Kingdom 25 October 1945
- Stricken: 19 December 1945
- Fate: Sold for scrapping May 1946

United Kingdom
- Name: HMS Rutherford
- Namesake: Captain William Gordon Rutherford (1765-1818), British naval officer who was commanding officer of HMS Swiftsure during the Battle of Trafalgar in 1805
- Acquired: 16 December 1943
- Commissioned: 16 December 1943
- Decommissioned: 1945
- Identification: Pennant number K558
- Honours and awards: Battle honours for Atlantic 1944, English Channel 1944, and North Sea 1944-1945
- Fate: Returned to United States 25 October 1945

General characteristics
- Displacement: 1,400 long tons (1,422 t)
- Length: 306 ft (93 m)
- Beam: 36.75 ft (11.2 m)
- Draught: 9 ft (2.7 m)
- Propulsion: Two Foster-Wheeler Express "D"-type water-tube boilers; GE 13,500 shp (10,070 kW) steam turbines and generators (9,200 kW); Electric motors for 12,000 shp (8,900 kW); Two shafts
- Speed: 24 knots (44 km/h)
- Range: 5,500 nautical miles (10,200 km) at 15 knots (28 km/h)
- Complement: 186
- Sensors & processing systems: SA & SL type radars; Type 144 series Asdic; MF Direction Finding antenna; HF Direction Finding Type FH 4 antenna
- Armament: 3 × 3 in (76 mm) /50 Mk.22 guns; 1 × twin Bofors 40 mm mount Mk.I; 7–16 × 20 mm Oerlikon guns; Mark 10 Hedgehog antisubmarine mortar; Depth charges; QF 2-pounder naval gun

HMS Rutherford (K558) was a British Captain-class frigate of the Royal Navy in commission during World War II. Originally constructed as a United States Navy Buckley-class destroyer escort, she served in the Royal Navy from 1943 to 1945.

== Construction and transfer ==
The ship was laid down as the unnamed U.S. Navy destroyer escort DE-93 by Bethlehem-Hingham Shipyard, Inc., in Hingham, Massachusetts, on 4 August 1943 and launched on 23 October 1943. She was transferred to the United Kingdom upon completion on 16 December 1943.

== Service history ==
Commissioned into service in the Royal Navy as the frigate HMS Rutherford (K558) on 16 December 1943 simultaneously with her transfer, she underwent acceptance trials in Casco Bay in Maine and, upon finishing them in January 1944, proceeded to Bermuda for shakedown and crew training afloat and ashore. Completing shakedown and training in March 1944, she departed Bermuda bound for Halifax, Nova Scotia, Canada, suffering damage during the voyage when she struck submerged wreckage. She underwent repairs at Halifax and, upon completing them, proceeded to Belfast, Northern Ireland, where on 26 March 1944 she entered a shipyard for modifications to meet Royal Navy requirements.

After her modifications were completed in May 1944, Rutherford was assigned to serve in the 1st Destroyer Flotilla, based at Harwich, England, on convoy escort duty and as a Coastal Forces Control Frigate (CFCF), in the latter role operating with Royal Navy Coastal Forces responsible for controlling and providing radar support to groups of British motor torpedo boats intercepting German motor torpedo boats in the North Sea before the German boats could attack Allied convoys. In June 1944 she arrived in Harwich to assume her duties with her sister ships HMS Cosby (K559) and HMS Cubitt (K512).

The Allied invasion of Normandy began on 6 June 1944. Although not involved in the assault phase of the landings, Rutherford was assigned later in June to escort convoys from the Thames Estuary bringing reinforcements to the beachheads, and she carried out these duties until August 1944.

In September 1944, Rutherford returned to her convoy defence and CFCF duties at Harwich, operating in the Thames Estuary and North Sea through November 1944. In December 1944, she shifted the focus of her activities to waters off the coasts of Belgium and the Netherlands, engaging German motor torpedo boats reported by Allied aircraft and hitting several of them with gunfire. From January to March 1945 she operated on convoy defence and CFCF duties off the Scheldt Estuary.

In April 1945 Rutherford deployed off the Belgian and Dutch coasts with HMS Cubitt to continue her convoy defence and CFCF duties. On 7 April 1945 she took part in an engagement against German S-boat – known to the Allies as "E-boat" – motor torpedo boats in which two S-boats were badly damaged, also rescuing the crews of the British motor torpedo boats HMS MTB-494 and HMS MTB-5001 after they were fatally damaged by S-boats during a close-range battle. On 9 April 1945 she intercepted a group of S-boats sighted off Ostend, Belgium, by Allied aircraft and sank two of them in a short action.

After the surrender of Germany in early May 1945, Rutherford was selected for conversion to a fighter direction ship for service with the British Pacific Fleet. She proceeded to a commercial shipyard in the United Kingdom that month to undergo a refit for her new role. Her refit was not yet complete when the armistice with Japan of 15 August 1945 brought World War II to a close, and further work on her conversion was suspended.

The Royal Navy soon steamed Rutherford to the United States, where it returned her to the U.S. Navy on 25 October 1945.

== Disposal ==
The U.S. Navy struck Rutherford from its Naval Vessel Register on 19 December 1945. She was sold in May 1946 for scrapping.
