= William Gordon Rutherfurd =

Captain William Gordon Rutherfurd CB
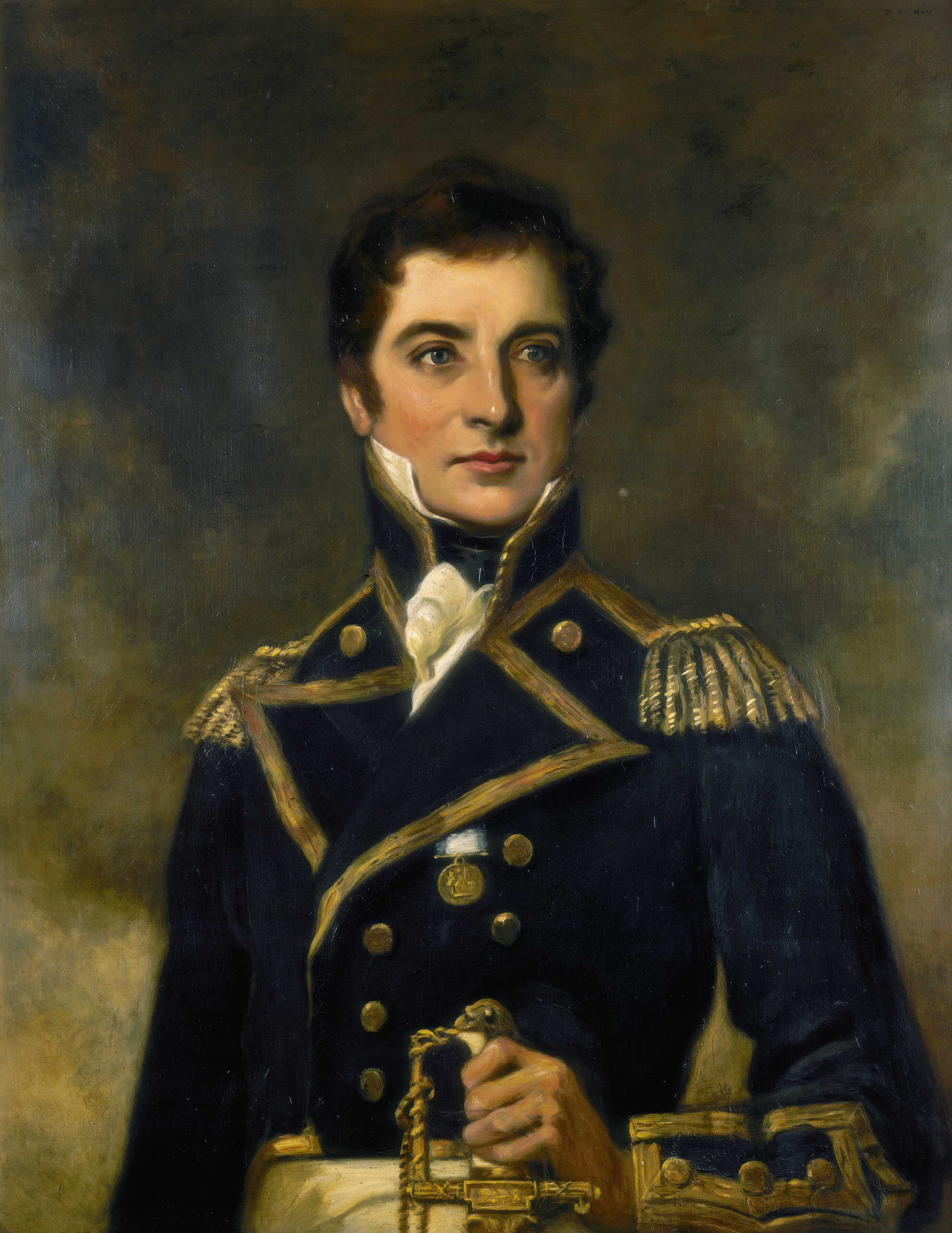
- Captain William Gordon Rutherford (also Rutherfurd)
- Born: 1764; Wilmington, North Carolina, U.S.
- Died: 1818 (aged 53–54); Greenwich Hospital
- Burial place: St Margaret’s Church, Westminster, London, England
- Military career
- Allegiance: United Kingdom
- Branch: Royal Navy
- Service years: 1778–1818
- Rank: Captain
- Units: HMS Boyne; HM Sloop Nautilus; HMS Adventure; HMS Dictator; HMS Brunswick; HMS Decade; HMS Swiftsure
- Other work: Captain of Royal Naval Hospital, Greenwich

Captain William Gordon Rutherfurd^{[a]} CB (1765 – 14 January 1818) was an officer in the Royal Navy during the French Revolutionary War and the Napoleonic Wars whose career was almost entirely conducted in the West Indies except for a brief stay in European waters during which he commanded the ship of the line HMS Swiftsure at the battle of Trafalgar.

== Early life ==
Rutherfurd was born in Wilmington, North Carolina, United States, to loyalist parents in 1764. His father was John Rutherfurd of Bowland Stow and his mother, Frances, was the widow of Gabriel Johnston the late governor. The family returned to Scotland and the young William was educated at University of St Andrew. The Rutherfurds moved to the Caribbean during the Revolution and in 1788 William was sent to sea aboard HMS Suffolk. Rutherfurd was a capable sailor and possessed a large amount of patronage. He joined the 98 gun, second rate, HMS Boyne, the flagship of Sir John Jervis in the West Indies, shortly after the outbreak of the French revolutionary wars and in 1793 he was promoted to acting lieutenant with his position being confirmed on 9 January 1794.

Rutherfurd was in the thick of the action during the 1794 West Indies campaign, serving with distinction as a junior officer in command of a landing party; storming forts on Martinique and taking part in operations in St Lucia and Guadeloupe. He received several accolades for his actions including, on 4 July, promotion to commander of the 16 gun sloop, Nautilus.

Remaining in the Caribbean, Rutherfurd then made the next leap to Post captain on 15 November 1796. In this capacity he successively commanded: The frigate HMS Adventure, the third rate HMS Dictator, the third rate HMS Brunswick and the 5th rate HMS Decade. Rutherford was instrumental in several minor skirmishes with enemy shipping amongst the islands, including the capture of Curaçao in 1800 for which he was again lauded. He returned to home waters in HMS Decade in 1804 and joined the Channel Fleet in the blockade of Cherbourg. The following year he was granted the 74 gun new ship Swiftsure participating in the blockade of the French Atlantic Coast and in the summer of 1805 he was dispatched to join Admiral Nelson's fleet off Cádiz and so was present at the battle on 21 October.

== Trafalgar ==
Situated far to the rear of Admiral Collingwood's division, Rutherfurd made strenuous efforts to reach the battle, but although she was quite a new ship Swiftsure had been at sea for sometime and so had damage to her hull which prevented her from making great speed. It thus took several hours for Swiftsure to reach the fight, but when she did she proved decisive in several of the southern combats, engaging at various times with the 80 gun Spanish ship, Argonauta and the 74 gun French ship, Achille. HMS Belleisle had been dismasted and was being pounded by three enemy ships when from the gunsmoke emerged the Swiftsure, her crew cheering and her guns firing double shotted rounds into the enemy, principally the Achille which was dismasted and caught fire, flames racing through the wooden ship. As thousands of panicking French sailors jumped into the sea, Rutherfurd ordered his ship's boats to rescue as many survivors as could be found, pulling hundreds aboard his ship but losing several men when the Achille's magazines suddenly detonated, swamping one of his boats. Swiftsure then tried to engage the 74 gun Aigle and the 80 gun Neptune. Aigle moved away however when her captain spotted the arrival of HMS Polyphemus.

Following the battle, the barely damaged Swiftsure took the sinking Redoutable in tow but was forced to cut the line when the French ship suddenly sank. Amongst the hundreds who drowned were five Swiftsure men. Rutherfurd returned to Gibraltar and from there travelled to Britain, where he was rewarded for his part in the action, but was then relegated to shore service and long periods of unemployment, unfortunately not possessing the seniority to make the jump to Admiral that so many of his contemporaries did.

== Later career and death ==
Suffering from ill-health, in 1814 he was put in command of Greenwich Hospital and a year later was made a Companion of the Bath ^{[b]} upon the inception of that order. He died in 1818 after a long illness and was buried in the Church of St. Margaret, Westminster, where his grave marker is still visible. ^{[c]}

== Namesake ==
The Royal Navy has named one ship for Rutherford, the frigate HMS Rutherford (K558), which was in commission from 1943 to 1945 and saw action in World War II.

== Notes ==
a. Also spelled Rutherford.
b 4 June 1815.
c Memorial: Wall marble tablet, St Margaret's Church, Westminster, London.
