= HMS Lawford (K514) =

Frigate of the Royal Navy

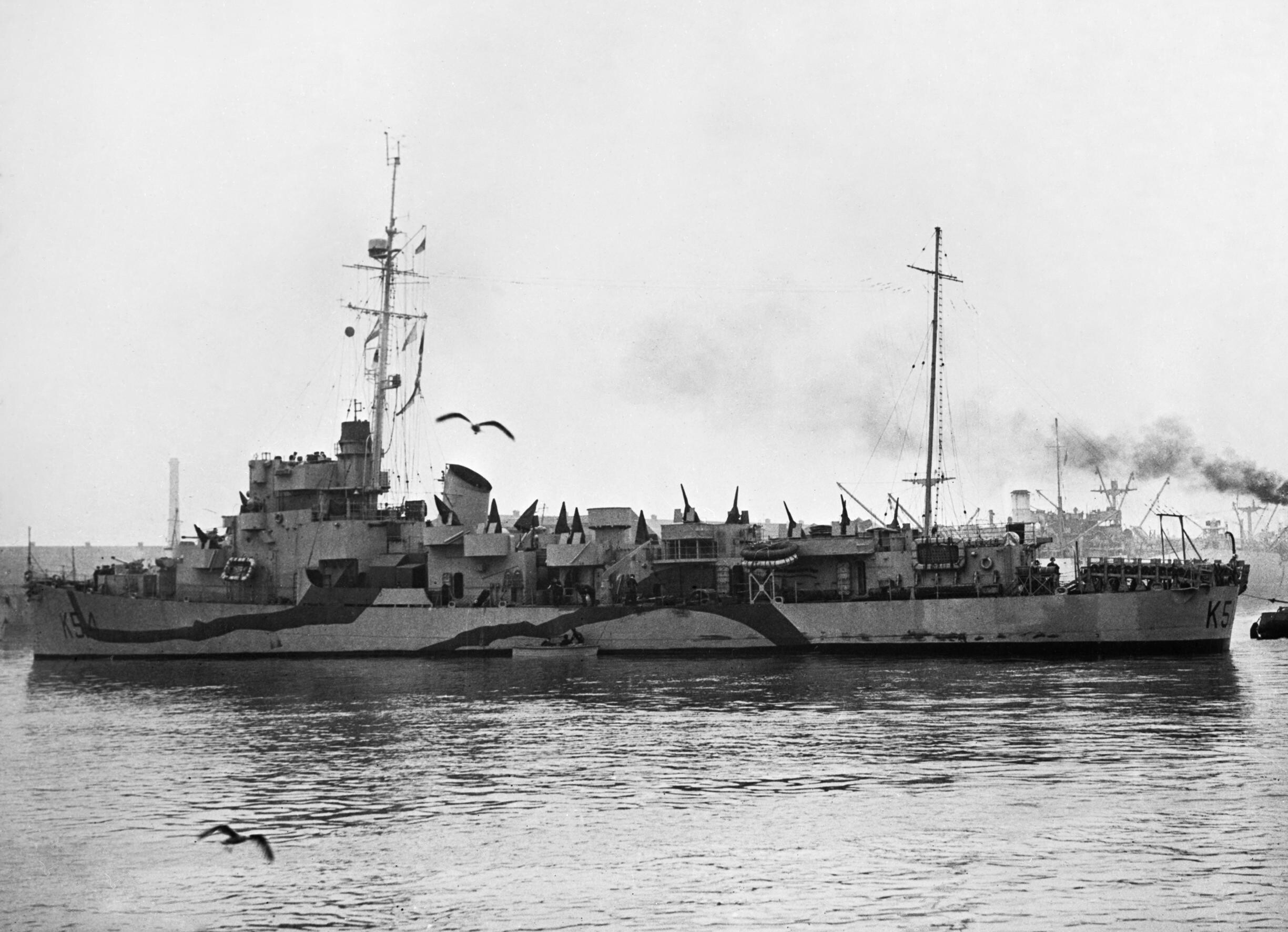
- HMS Lawford at Liverpool, 13 February 1944

History

United States
- Name: USS Lawford (DE-516)
- Namesake: John Lawford
- Fate: Transferred to Royal Navy under Lend-Lease

United Kingdom
- Name: HMS Lawford (K514)
- Launched: 13 August 1943
- Fate: Sunk by Aerial attack during Normandy Landings, 8 June 1944

General characteristics
- Class & type: Evarts-class destroyer escort (modified to HQ vessel)
- Displacement: 1,190 long tons (1,210 t) (standard)
- Length: 289 ft 5 in (88.2 m)
- Beam: 35 ft 2 in (10.7 m)
- Draught: 10 ft 1 in (3.1 m)
- Installed power: 6,000 shp (4,500 kW) electric motors
- Propulsion: 2 shafts; 4 diesel engines
- Speed: 20 knots (37 km/h; 23 mph)
- Range: 6,000 nmi (11,000 km; 6,900 mi) at 12 knots (22 km/h; 14 mph)
- Complement: 240
- Sensors & processing systems: SA & SL type radars; Type 144 series Asdic; MF Direction Finding; HF Direction Finding
- Armament: 2 × single 3 in (76 mm)/50 guns; 16 × single 20 mm Oerlikon AA guns; 2 × Depth charge rails

HMS Lawford (K514) was a converted Captain-class frigate of the Royal Navy, sunk during Operation Overlord in 1944. Built as the Evarts-class destroyer escort USS Lawford (DE-516) in 1943, Lawford was transferred under Lend Lease to the UK where it was converted for use as a headquarters ship given extra space for staff officers, more radios and additional radar. Lawford was sunk during an air attack on 8 June 1944.

== Description ==
The Evarts-class ships had an overall length of 289 feet 5 inches (88.2 m), a beam of 35 feet 2 inches (10.7 m), and a draught of 10 feet 1 inch (3.1 m) at full load. They displaced 1,190 long tons (1,210 t) at (standard) and 1,416 long tons (1,439 t) at full load. The ships had a diesel–electric powertrain derived from a submarine propulsion system with four General Motors 16-cylinder diesel engines providing power to four General Electric electric generators which sent electricity to four 1,500-shaft-horsepower (1,100 kW) General Electric electric motors which drove the two propeller shafts. The destroyer escorts had enough power give them a speed of 20 knots (37 km/h; 23 mph) and enough fuel oil to give them a range of 6,000 nautical miles (11,000 km; 6,900 mi) at 12 knots (22 km/h; 14 mph). Their crew consisted of 198 officers and ratings.

The armament of the Evarts-class ships in British service consisted of three single mounts for 3-inch (76 mm)/50 Mk 22 dual-purpose guns; one superfiring pair forward of the bridge and the third gun aft of the superstructure. Anti-aircraft defence was intended to consisted of a twin-gun mount for 40-millimetre (1.6 in) Bofors anti-aircraft (AA) guns atop the rear superstructure with nine 20 mm (0.8 in) Oerlikon guns located on the superstructure, but production shortages meant that that not all guns were fitted, or that additional Oerlikons replaced the Bofors guns. A Mark 10 Hedgehog anti-submarine mortar was positioned just behind the forward gun. The ships were also equipped with two depth charge rails at the stern and four "K-gun" depth charge throwers.

== Construction and career ==
Lawford was selected to be converted into an HQ ship in the UK for the Normandy landings and the only convoy that she escorted was the one in which she sailed to the UK. This involved the removal of her aft 3-inch gun, the extension of the superstructure to house all the staff and radio personnel and the installation of additional radar sets. The number of Oerlikons mounted aboard was increased to 16 weapons. On 8 June 1944, whilst operating off Juno Beach, she was hit by two bombs during an air attack and sunk. Thirty-seven of her crew died. The wreck lies in 21 m (69 ft) of water at 49°25′43″N 00°23′47″W.

== See also ==
- List of Captain class frigates
- List of Allied warships in the Normandy landings
- List of ships sunk by missiles
