= HMS Abelia =

1941 Flower-class corvette

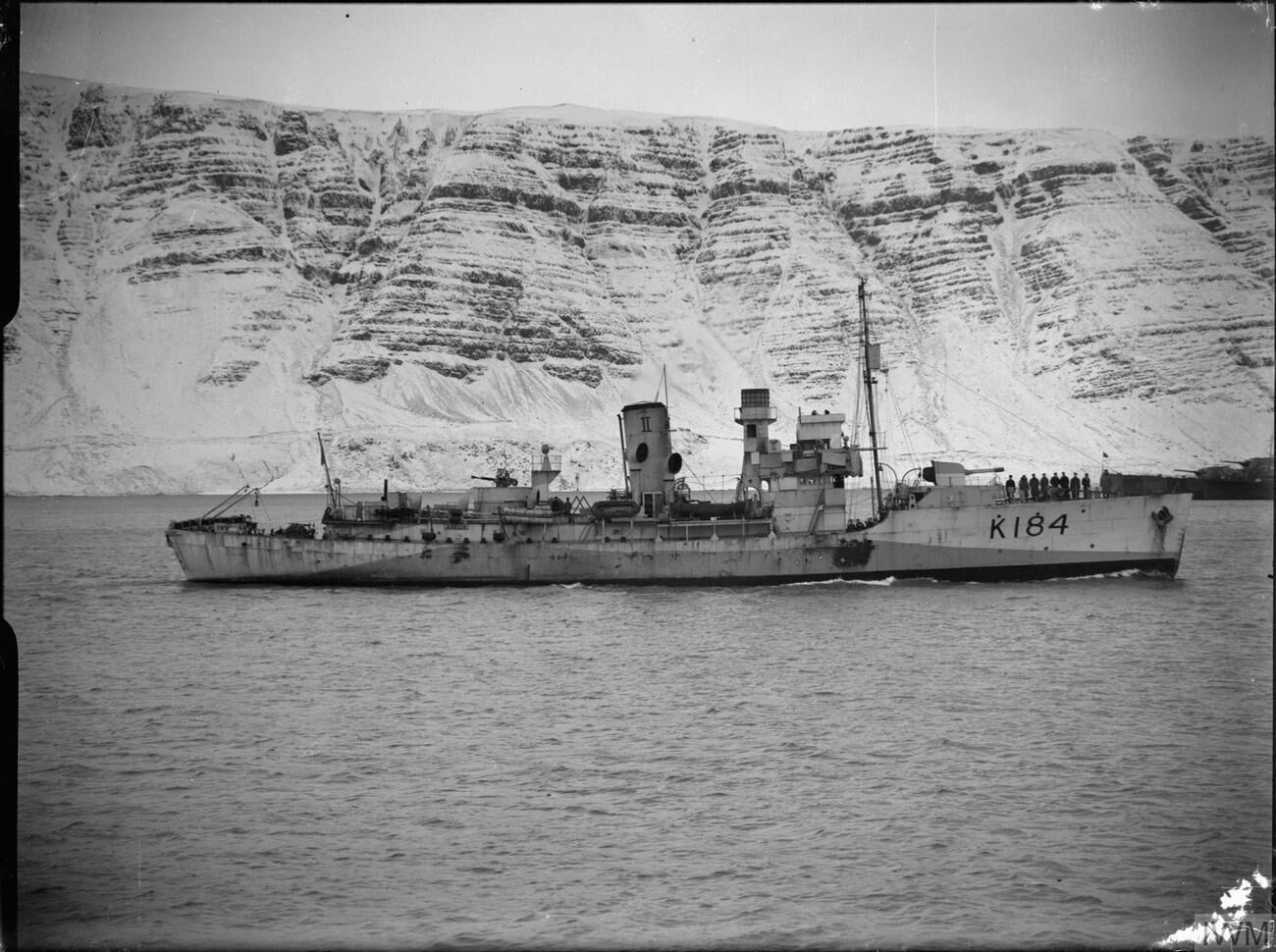
- At Hvalfjord, Iceland after a patrol in the North Atlantic in search of the German battleship Tirpitz, January 1942

History

United Kingdom
- Name: HMS Abelia
- Builder: Harland & Wolff, Belfast
- Yard number: 1095
- Launched: 28 November 1940
- Completed: 3 February 1941
- Decommissioned: 1946
- Identification: Pennant number: K184
- Fate: Sold as merchant ship 1947. Scrapped 1966.

General characteristics
- Class & type: Flower-class corvette
- Displacement: 925 long tons
- Length: 205 ft (62 m) o/a
- Beam: 33 ft (10 m)
- Draught: 11 ft 6 in (3.51 m)
- Propulsion: 1 × 4-cycle triple-expansion reciprocating steam engine; 2 × fire tube Scotch boilers; Single shaft; 2,750 ihp (2,050 kW)
- Speed: 16 kn (30 km/h)
- Range: 3,500 nmi (6,500 km) at 12 kn (22 km/h)
- Complement: 85
- Sensors & processing systems: 1 × SW1C or 2C radar; 1 × Type 123A or Type 127DV sonar
- Armament: 1 × BL 4-inch (101.6 mm) Mk.IX gun; 2 × Vickers .50 cal machine gun (twin); 2 × Lewis .303 cal machine gun (twin); 2 × Mk.II Depth charge throwers; 2 × Depth charge rails with 40 depth charges

Service record
- Commanders: Orme G. Stuart (1943–1944)
- Operations: Battle of the Atlantic

HMS Abelia was a Flower-class corvette that served in the Royal Navy and was built by Harland & Wolff in 1941.

She was launched on 28 November 1940, and was fitted for minesweeping. She served in World War II; her commanding officer for parts of 1943 and 1944 was Lieutenant Orme G. Stuart.

On 9 January 1944 Abelia encountered a U-boat while on convoy escort duty, and moved to attack with depth charges. Lieutenant Stuart ordered an increase in speed at 950 yards (870 m) to prevent being torpedoed, not knowing that the U-boat was equipped with T5 torpedoes, for which he would have needed to increase speed at 700 yards (640 m). Abelia was hit and lost her rudder, and the U-boat escaped.

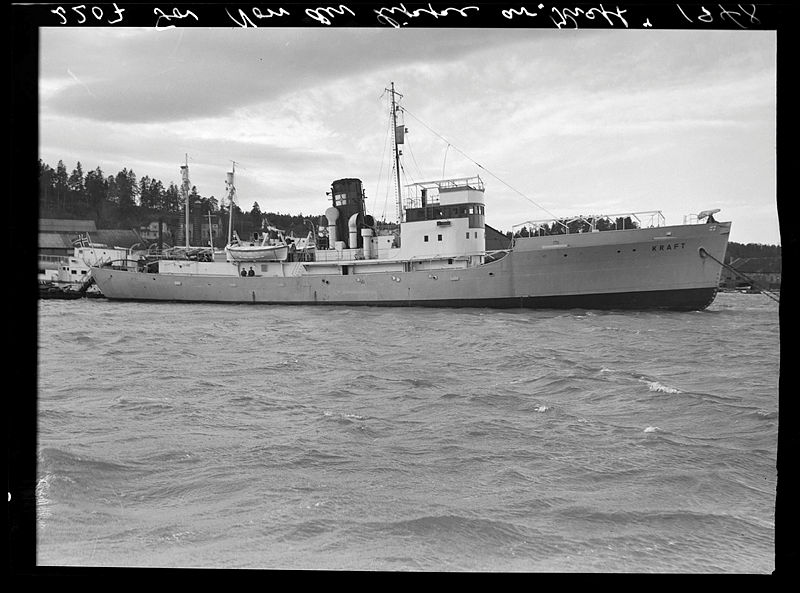
Kraft

She was sold in 1947 and became the merchant vessel Kraft in 1948. She was renamed Arne Skontorp in 1954. She was eventually scrapped in December 1966.

== Bibliography ==
- Colledge, J. J.; Warlow, Ben & Bush, Steve (2020). Ships of the Royal Navy: The Complete Record of all Fighting Ships of the Royal Navy from the 15th Century to the Present (5th revised and updated ed.). Seaforth Publishing. ISBN 978-1-5267-9327-0.
- Lenton, H. T. (1998). British & Empire Warships of the Second World War. Naval Institute Press. ISBN 1-55750-048-7.
- Rohwer, Jürgen (2005). Chronology of the War at Sea 1939–1945: The Naval History of World War Two (Third Revised ed.). Naval Institute Press. ISBN 1-59114-119-2.
