= HMS Retalick =

Frigate of the Royal Navy

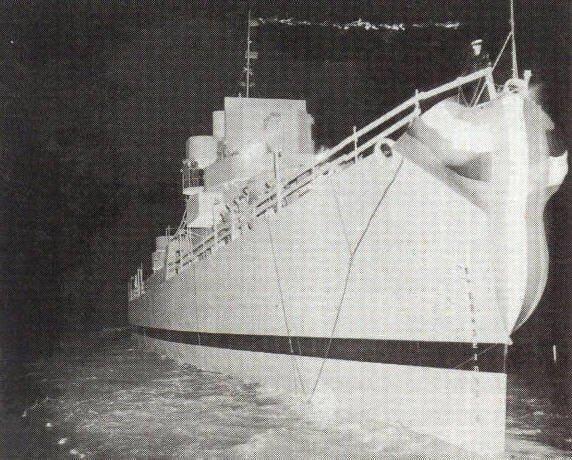
- The future HMS Retalick (K555) at Bethlehem-Hingham Shipyard in Hingham, Massachusetts, on the day she was launched, 9 October 1943.

History

United States
- Name: unnamed (DE-90)
- Ordered: 10 January 1942
- Builder: Bethlehem-Hingham Shipyard, Hingham, Massachusetts
- Laid down: 21 July 1943
- Launched: 9 October 1943
- Completed: 8 December 1943
- Fate: Transferred to United Kingdom 8 December 1943
- Acquired: Returned by United Kingdom 25 October 1945
- Stricken: 19 December 1945
- Fate: Sold for scrapping 7 May 1946

United Kingdom
- Name: HMS Retalick (K555)
- Namesake: Captain Richard Retalick ( ? - 1803), British naval officer who was commanding officer of HMS Defiance during the Battle of Copenhagen in 1801
- Acquired: 8 December 1943
- Commissioned: 8 December 1943
- Fate: Returned to United States 25 October 1945

General characteristics
- Displacement: 1,400 long tons (1,422 t)
- Length: 306 ft (93 m)
- Beam: 36.75 ft (11.2 m)
- Draught: 9 ft (2.7 m)
- Propulsion: Two Foster-Wheeler Express "D"-type water-tube boilers; GE 13,500 shp (10,070 kW) steam turbines and generators (9,200 kW); Electric motors for 12,000 shp (8,900 kW); Two shafts
- Speed: 24 knots (44 km/h)
- Range: 5,500 nautical miles (10,200 km) at 15 knots (28 km/h)
- Complement: 186
- Sensors & processing systems: SA & SL type radars; Type 144 series Asdic; MF Direction Finding antenna; HF Direction Finding Type FH 4 antenna
- Armament: 3 × 3 in (76 mm) /50 Mk.22 guns; 1 × twin Bofors 40 mm mount Mk.I; 7–16 × 20 mm Oerlikon guns; Mark 10 Hedgehog antisubmarine mortar; Depth charges; QF 2-pounder naval gun

HMS Retalick (K555) was a British Captain-class frigate of the Royal Navy in commission during World War II. Originally constructed as a United States Navy Buckley class destroyer escort, she served in the Royal Navy from 1943 to 1945.

== Construction and transfer ==
The ship was laid down as the unnamed U.S. Navy destroyer escort DE-90 by Bethlehem-Hingham Shipyard, Inc., in Hingham, Massachusetts, on 21 July 1943 and launched on 9 October 1943. She was transferred to the United Kingdom under Lend-Lease upon completion on 8 December 1943.

== Service history ==
Commissioned into service in the Royal Navy as the frigate HMS Retalick (K555) on 8 December 1943 simultaneously with her transfer, the ship served on patrol and escort duty for the remainder of World War II.

The Royal Navy returned Retalick to the U.S. Navy on 25 October 1945.

== Disposal ==
The U.S. Navy struck Retalick from its Naval Vessel Register on 19 December 1945. She was sold on 7 May 1946 for scrapping.
