= German submarine U-1001 =

German World War II submarine

- U-995 Type VIIC/41 at the Laboe Naval Memorial. This U-boat is almost identical to U-1001.

History

Nazi Germany
- Name: U-1001
- Ordered: 14 October 1941
- Builder: Blohm & Voss, Hamburg
- Yard number: 201
- Laid down: 31 December 1942
- Launched: 6 October 1943
- Commissioned: 18 November 1943
- Fate: Sunk on 8 April 1945

General characteristics
- Type: Type VIIC/41 submarine
- Displacement: 757 long tons (769 t) surfaced; 857 long tons (871 t) submerged
- Length: 67.10 m (220 ft 2 in) o/a; 50.50 m (165 ft 8 in) pressure hull
- Beam: 6.20 m (20 ft 4 in) o/a; 4.70 m (15 ft 5 in) pressure hull
- Height: 9.60 m (31 ft 6 in)
- Draught: 4.74 m (15 ft 7 in)
- Installed power: 2 × diesel engines; 2,800–3,200 PS (2,100–2,400 kW; 2,800–3,200 bhp) (diesels); 750 PS (550 kW; 740 shp) (electric)
- Propulsion: 2 × electric motors; 2 × screws
- Speed: 17.7 knots (32.8 km/h; 20.4 mph) surfaced; 7.6 knots (14.1 km/h; 8.7 mph) submerged
- Range: 8,500 nmi (15,700 km; 9,800 mi) at 10 knots (19 km/h; 12 mph) surfaced; 80 nmi (150 km; 92 mi) at 4 knots (7.4 km/h; 4.6 mph) submerged
- Test depth: 250 m (820 ft); Calculated crush depth: 250–295 m (820–968 ft)
- Complement: 44-52 officers & ratings
- Armament: 5 × 53.3 cm (21 in) torpedo tubes (4 bow, 1 stern); 14 × torpedoes or; 26 × TMA or TMB Naval mines; 1 × 8.8 cm (3.46 in) deck gun (220 rounds); 1 × 3.7 cm (1.5 in) Flak M42 AA gun; 2 × 2 cm (0.79 in) C/30 AA guns

Service record
- Part of: 31st U-boat Flotilla; 18 November 1943 – 31 July 1944; 8th U-boat Flotilla; 1 August 1944 – 15 February 1945; 5th U-boat Flotilla; 16 February – 8 April 1945
- Identification codes: M 34 668
- Commanders: Kptlt. Ernst-Ulrich Blaudow; 18 November 1943 – 8 April 1945
- Operations: 6 patrols: 1st patrol: a. 8 June – 5 July 1944; b. 9 July 1944; c. 28 July – 1 August 1944; d. 3 – 6 August 1944; e. 7 – 9 August 1944; f. 10 August 1944; g. 11 – 15 August 1944; h. 20 – 24 August 1944; i. 26 August 1944; 2nd patrol: a. 29 August – 9 September 1944; b. 12 September 1944; 3rd patrol: 21 September – 2 October 1944; 4th patrol: 4 October – 1 November 1944; 5th patrol: a. 4 – 30 January 1945; b. 5 – 8 March 1945; c. 10 – 11 March 1945; 6th patrol: 11 March – 8 April 1945
- Victories: None

German submarine U-1001 was a Type VIIC/41 U-boat of Nazi Germany's Kriegsmarine during World War II.

She was ordered on 14 October 1941, and was laid down on 31 December 1942, at Blohm & Voss, Hamburg, as yard number 201. She was launched on 6 October 1943, and commissioned under the command of Kapitänleutnant Ernst-Ulrich Blaudow on 18 November 1943.

== Design ==
German Type VIIC/41 submarines were preceded by the heavier Type VIIC submarines. U-1001 had a displacement of 769 tonnes (757 long tons) when at the surface and 871 tonnes (857 long tons) while submerged. She had a total length of 67.10 m (220 ft 2 in), a pressure hull length of 50.50 m (165 ft 8 in), an overall beam of 6.20 m (20 ft 4 in), a height of 9.60 m (31 ft 6 in), and a draught of 4.74 m (15 ft 7 in). The submarine was powered by two Germaniawerft F46 four-stroke, six-cylinder supercharged diesel engines producing a total of 2,800 to 3,200 metric horsepower (2,060 to 2,350 kW; 2,760 to 3,160 shp) for use while surfaced, two BBC GG UB 720/8 double-acting electric motors producing a total of 750 metric horsepower (550 kW; 740 shp) for use while submerged. She had two shafts and two 1.23 m (4 ft) propellers. The boat was capable of operating at depths of up to 230 metres (750 ft).

The submarine had a maximum surface speed of 17.7 knots (32.8 km/h; 20.4 mph) and a maximum submerged speed of 7.6 knots (14.1 km/h; 8.7 mph). When submerged, the boat could operate for 80 nautical miles (150 km; 92 mi) at 4 knots (7.4 km/h; 4.6 mph); when surfaced, she could travel 8,500 nautical miles (15,700 km; 9,800 mi) at 10 knots (19 km/h; 12 mph). U-1001 was fitted with five 53.3 cm (21 in) torpedo tubes (four fitted at the bow and one at the stern), fourteen torpedoes or 26 TMA or TMB Naval mines, one 8.8 cm (3.46 in) SK C/35 naval gun, (220 rounds), one 3.7 cm (1.5 in) Flak M42 and two 2 cm (0.79 in) C/30 anti-aircraft guns. The boat had a complement of between forty-four and fifty-two.

== Service history ==
U-1001 participated in six war patrols. None of these resulted in any ships damaged or sunk.

On 21 September, during her third war patrol, U-1001 laid 15 TMB near Porkkala, on the Baltic Sea. The next day, 22 Sep 1944, U-1001 rescued 13 shipwrecked German soldiers from the Baltic and landed them later on 2 October, at Libau.

On 29 October 1944, during her fourth war patrol, U-1001 transferred two medical cases from U-958 and U-475 in the Baltic.

U-1001 had Schnorchel underwater-breathing apparatus fitted out in February 1945.

On 8 April 1945, 29 days out of Kristiansand, on her sixth war patrol, she was located by the British frigates HMS Fitzroy and HMS Byron. U-1001 was sunk by depth charges in the North Atlantic south-west of Land's End, killing all forty-six of her crew.

The wreck now lies at 49°19′N 10°23′W.

== See also ==
- Battle of the Atlantic

== Bibliography ==
- Busch, Rainer; Röll, Hans-Joachim (1999). German U-boat commanders of World War II : a biographical dictionary. Translated by Brooks, Geoffrey. London, Annapolis, Md: Greenhill Books, Naval Institute Press. ISBN 1-55750-186-6.
- Busch, Rainer; Röll, Hans-Joachim (1999). Deutsche U-Boot-Verluste von September 1939 bis Mai 1945 [German U-boat losses from September 1939 to May 1945]. Der U-Boot-Krieg (in German). Vol. IV. Hamburg, Berlin, Bonn: Mittler. ISBN 3-8132-0514-2.
- Gröner, Erich; Jung, Dieter; Maass, Martin (1991). German Warships 1815–1945, U-boats and Mine Warfare Vessels. Vol. 2. Translated by Thomas, Keith; Magowan, Rachel. London: Conway Maritime Press. ISBN 0-85177-593-4.
