= Robert Redmill =

British naval officer (c. 1765–1819)

Captain Robert Redmill CB
- Born: c. 1765
- Died: February 1819; Stevenage, Hertfordshire, England
- Military career
- Allegiance: Great Britain; United Kingdom
- Branch: Royal Navy
- Service years: c.1783–1806
- Rank: Captain
- Commands: HMS Comet; HMS Delft; HMS Polyphemus
- Conflicts: French Revolutionary Wars; Battle of Hyères Islands; Egyptian Campaign; Napoleonic Wars; Battle of Trafalgar
- Awards: Companion of the Order of the Bath

Captain Robert Redmill CB (c. 1765 – February 1819) was a British naval officer who served during the French Revolutionary and Napoleonic Wars. He commanded Polyphemus during the Battle of Trafalgar. Although he was late into the action, he gained much acclaim for saving the battered Victory from sinking in the storm which followed the action.

== Biography ==
Little is known of Redmill's personal life—even his birth date is unsure. It is recorded that he was promoted to lieutenant on 24 December 1783, which means that if he followed the standard career path of receiving promotion at 18 indicates that he was born in 1765, but his real year of birth is unknown. (Note: The ThreeDecks.org entry for Redmill cites parish records from All Saints' Church, Stamford, Lincolnshire, giving the baptismal date of 9 December 1758.) An unspectacular officer, he benefited from the general promotion at the outbreak of the Revolutionary Wars, making commander in 1795 and taking over the fireship Comet. He was apparently engaged with the enemy during the Naval Battle of Hyères Islands under Lord Hotham in March of that year, but did not distinguish himself and was not mentioned in the dispatches of the action.

Receiving the jump to post-captain on 16 December 1796, Redmill was not given a ship until 1799 when he was placed in command of the prize ship the 64 gun Delft, a poorly built Dutch ship used almost exclusively as a troop transport. It was in this role that Redmill and his ship participated in the invasion of Egypt in 1801, landing troops from the Foot Guards at Aboukir Bay. For this and other vital transportation services, Redmill was granted a large gold medal by Selim III, Sultan of the Ottoman Empire.

Granted the Polyphemus in 1805 and attached to Admiral Nelson's fleet off Cádiz, Redmill was not expected to take a major role in the fighting to follow. Polyphemus was an old and much battered ship, as well as being much too small for effective service in the line of battle. Nonetheless, when battle was joined on 21 October, Polyphemus lined up in Collingwood's division with the other ships, albeit right at the rear of the line where her poor sailing qualities could not get in the way of faster and more powerful ships. Arriving late to the battle, Polyphemus was still able to join the fight, exchanging broadsides with the large Spanish flagship Principe de Asturias and the French Berwick, although both were badly damaged by other ships by the time Redmill engaged them.

It was in the aftermath of the battle that Redmill and the old Polyphemus won their spurs, having suffered just six casualties in the battle and very little in the way of structural damage, Polyphemus needed no repairs and could parcel out her supplies to other ships in more desperate need, as well as offer a tow to dismasted ships which could no longer sail unaided. The British flagship Victory was just such a victim, and during the week of ferocious storms which followed the battle, Redmill nursed his stricken superior back to Gibraltar by means of an enormous towrope attached with great difficulty to the bow of Victory and at the other end to Redmill's own cabin on Polyphemus.

Following the storm, Redmill continued in service for another year, but a severe illness, which had plagued his career for many years, forced him to retire to England. Back home he was lauded as a hero, but was unable to find work due to his increasing poor health. He was made a Companion in The Most Honourable Order of the Bath on 4 June 1815, but died in Stevenage in February 1819. Unfortunately his grave at St Nicholas Church, has long since been lost, and with it many details about the circumstances of his final years.
