= HMS Redmill (K554) =

Frigate of the Royal Navy

History

United States
- Name: unnamed (DE-89)
- Ordered: 10 January 1942
- Builder: Bethlehem-Hingham Shipyard, Hingham, Massachusetts
- Laid down: 14 July 1943
- Launched: 2 October 1943
- Sponsored by: Mrs. James E. Hamilton
- Completed: 30 November 1943
- Fate: Transferred to United Kingdom 30 November 1943
- Acquired: Returned by United Kingdom 20 January 1947
- Stricken: 7 February 1947
- Fate: Sold for scrapping 30 January 1947 or 4 February 1947

United Kingdom
- Name: HMS Redmill (K554)
- Namesake: Captain Robert Redmill (ca. 1765-1819), British naval officer who was commanding officer of HMS Polyphemus during the Battle of Trafalgar in 1805
- Acquired: 30 November 1943
- Commissioned: 30 November 1943
- Fate: Constructive total loss after 27 April 1945; Returned to United States 20 January 1947

General characteristics
- Displacement: 1,400 long tons (1,422 t)
- Length: 306 ft (93 m)
- Beam: 36.75 ft (11.2 m)
- Draught: 9 ft (2.7 m)
- Propulsion: Two Foster-Wheeler Express "D"-type water-tube boilers; GE 13,500 shp (10,070 kW) steam turbines and generators (9,200 kW); Electric motors for 12,000 shp (8,900 kW); Two shafts
- Speed: 24 knots (44 km/h)
- Range: 5,500 nautical miles (10,200 km) at 15 knots (28 km/h)
- Complement: 186
- Sensors & processing systems: SA & SL type radars; Type 144 series Asdic; MF Direction Finding antenna; HF Direction Finding Type FH 4 antenna
- Armament: 3 × 3 in (76 mm) /50 Mk.22 guns; 1 × twin Bofors 40 mm mount Mk.I; 7–16 × 20 mm Oerlikon guns; Mark 10 Hedgehog antisubmarine mortar; Depth charges; QF 2-pounder naval gun

The second HMS Redmill (K554), and the first ship to see service under the name, was a British Captain-class frigate of the Royal Navy in commission during World War II. Originally constructed as a United States Navy Buckley class destroyer escort, she served in the Royal Navy from 1943 to 1945.

== Construction and transfer ==
The ship was laid down as the unnamed U.S. Navy destroyer escort DE-89 by Bethlehem-Hingham Shipyard, Inc., in Hingham, Massachusetts, on 14 July 1943 and launched on 2 October 1943, sponsored by Mrs. James E. Hamilton, the wife of Captain James E. Hamilton of the U.S. Navy's Bureau of Ships. The ship was transferred to the United Kingdom upon completion on 30 November 1943.

== Service history ==
Commissioned into service in the Royal Navy as the frigate HMS Redmill (K554) on 30 November 1943 simultaneously with her transfer, the ship served on patrol and escort duty. On 27 March 1945 she joined the British frigates HMS Byron (K508) and HMS Fitzroy (K553) in a depth charge attack which sank the German submarine U-722 in the North Atlantic Ocean near the Hebrides at 57°09′00″N 006°55′00″W.

On 27 April 1945, the German submarine U-1105 detected three British frigates in the North Atlantic 25 nautical miles (46 km) west of County Mayo, Ireland, and fired two G7es – known to the Allies as "GNAT" – torpedoes at them. Fifty seconds later, the first torpedo struck Redmill at 54°23′00″N 010°36′00″W, followed a few seconds later by the second, together blowing 60 feet (over 18 meters) of her stern off. U-1105 evaded counterattack. Assisted by the British frigate HMS Rupert (K561), Redmill managed to remain afloat and was towed to Lisahally, Northern Ireland.

Found to be beyond economical repair, Redmill was declared a constructive total loss. The Royal Navy returned her hulk to U.S. custody on 20 January 1947.

== Disposal ==
The United States sold Redmill on either 30 January 1947 or 4 February 1947 (sources vary) to the Athens Piraeus Electricity Company, Ltd., of Athens, Greece, for scrapping. The U.S. Navy struck Redmill from its Naval Vessel Register on 7 February 1947.
