= Dutch ship Delft (1783) =

Ship of the line of the Dutch States Navy

Coordinates: 51.90221°N 4.45154°E

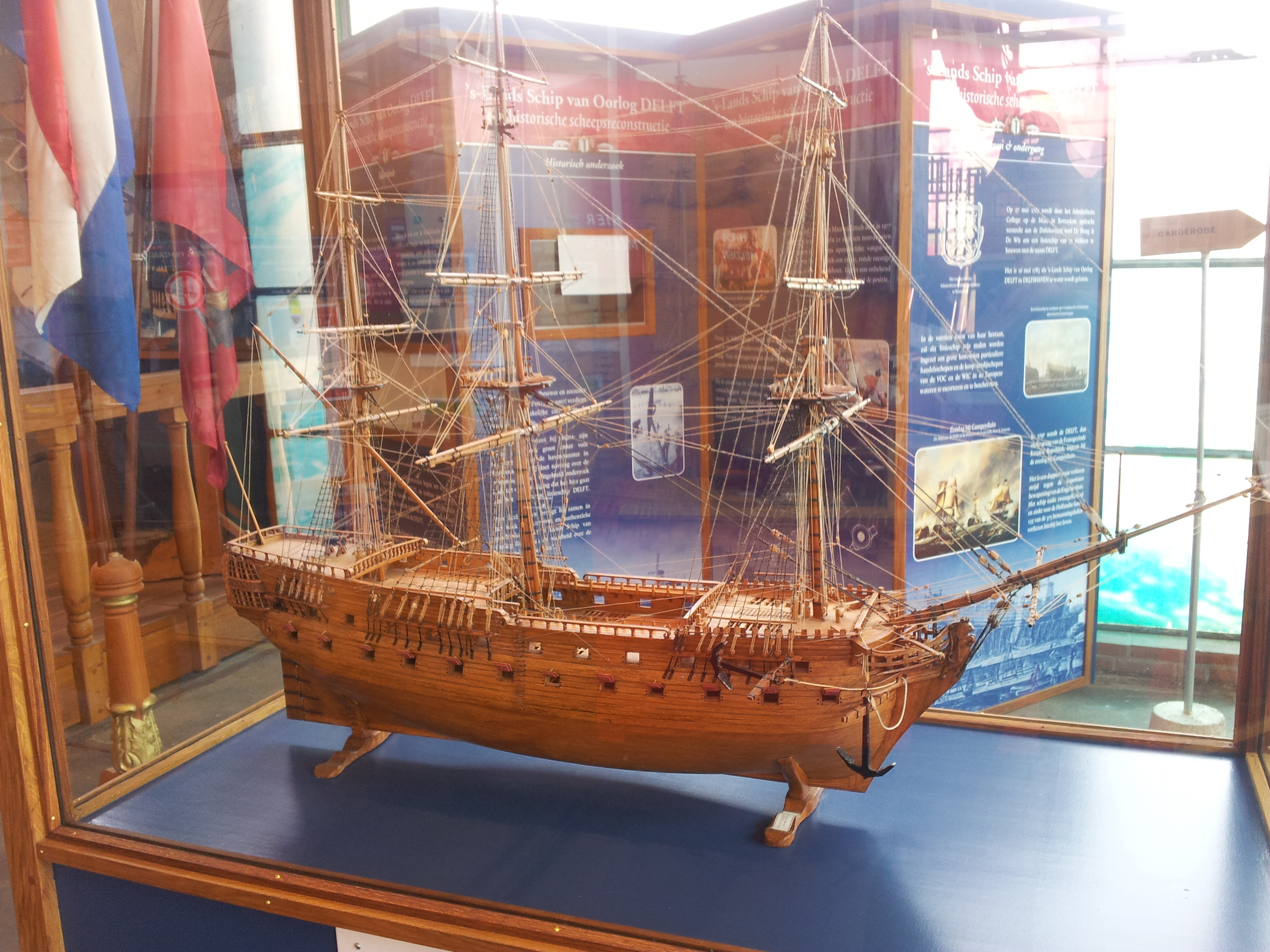
- Ship model of Delft

History

Dutch Republic
- Name: Delft
- Ordered: 27 May 1782
- Builder: De Hoog & De Wit at Delfshaven
- Commissioned: 16 May 1783
- Out of service: 19 January 1795

Batavian Republic
- In service: 19 January 1795
- Captured: 11 October 1797
- Fate: Sank on 15 October 1797

General characteristics
- Class & type: 56-gun ship of the line
- Tons burthen: 1,04787/94 (bm)
- Length: 144 ft 7 in (44.1 m) (gundeck); 118 ft 7 in (36.1 m) (keel)
- Beam: 40 ft 10 in (12.4 m)
- Depth of hold: 16 ft 5 in (5.0 m)
- Propulsion: Sails
- Sail plan: Full-rigged ship
- Armament: Lower gundeck:22 × 24-pounder guns; Upper gundeck 24 × 12-pounder guns; QD and fc: 8 ×6-pounder guns

Delft was a 56-gun ship of the line of the Dutch States Navy. Launched in 1783, she became part of the Batavian Navy in 1795. The Royal Navy captured her on 11 October 1797 at the Battle of Camperdown, and Delft sunk four days later while being towed to England as a prize.

== History ==
The order to construct the ship was given on 27 May 1782 by the Admiralty of the Meuse. Delft was commissioned on 16 May 1783 by the United Netherlands Navy. On 24 December 1787, Delft set sail on a mission against the Barbary pirates and protected Dutch traders in the Mediterranean Sea. For the ship's second mission starting 31 May 1793 Theodorus Frederik van Capellen became the new commanding officer. During this mission he freed 75 Dutch slaves from Algiers.

In 1795, the French conquered the Dutch Republic and the new Batavian Republic was founded. The French initially disarmed Delft because they feared that Orangist rebels would use her, but later the Dutch reactivated her to participate in the war with Britain. Gerrit Verdooren van Asperen became her captain. On 11 October 1797, Delft took part in the Battle of Camperdown. After heavy fighting she struck to the British; she sank off Scheveningen four days later while being towed to Britain.

During the battle the British captured the Dutch Hercules under Captain G. J. van Rijsoort. They renamed her HMS Delft, in honour of the brave resistance Delft had made in the battle. From 2001 to 2018, work had been under way in Rotterdam to build a replica of Delft at Historical Shipyard 'de Delft' (Dutch: Historische Scheepswerf 'de Delft') in Delfshaven, near to the place where the original ship was built.
