= Hired armed cutter Earl St Vincent =

Two vessels have been named His Majesty's hired armed cutter Earl St Vincent. (Note: The name Earl St Vincent comes from John Jervis, 1st Earl of St Vincent.)

== The first Earl St Vincent ==
The first hired armed cutter Earl St Vincent (or Earl of St Vincent) served the British Royal Navy from 16 March 1798 to 29 April 1802, when she was returned to her owners. She was armed with 14 or 16 cannon and had a crew of 56 men and was of 185 tons (bm).

In 1798 and 1799 she was in the Mediterranean where she carried letters and despatches for Lord Nelson. In 1799, at least, she was under the command of Lieutenant Sargeant. On 25 July 1800 she captured Revanche.

On 6 May 1800, His Majesty's hired armed schooner Earl St Vincent, under the command of Lieutenant Henry Boys, captured the Spanish privateer Santa Ysabella (alias Saavedra).

In 1801 she was under the command of Lieutenant H. Boys (Boyce) at Plymouth. She sailed on 20 January for Jamaica with the King's proclamation for stopping all Russian, Danish and Swedish vessels. However, between 26 and 28 January she was in company with a number of other vessels at the capture of the French 36-gun frigate Dédaigneuse, afterwards added to the British navy under the same name. On 27 January she was in company with Amethyst and Sirius when they captured the Spanish ship Carlotta. On 5 May Earl St Vincent and Naiad captured Phoenix.

Earl St Vincent returned to Portsmouth on 2 July. When she returned to Plymouth on 8 July she brought in Cheri, a valuable French brig, bound for Bordeaux from Cayenne with a cargo of cocoa, coffee and dye-wood. She and Naiad had captured Cheri on 8 April 1801.

On 21 July Lieutenant Boyce received orders to fit for foreign service and the following day he went into the Sound and sailed with a convoy to the eastward. On 6 August she captured the French schooner Elise, in sight of Diamond. On 26 August she brought in to Plymouth two rich Spanish prizes that she had captured of Cape Ortegal.

On 2 November at the height of a gale, Earl St Vincent, which was moored to the south of St Nicholas' Island (now Drake's Island), parted both anchors and scudded through the sound under bare poles to the entrance of the Cattewater. By skillful steering she ran through two lines of trawlers, missed both pier-heads and finished up on the mud in Sutton Pool, quite safe.

Lloyd's List reported on 22 April 1802 that the Earl St Vincent's cutter had detained Fedre Lunder, Geudt, master, as she was sailing from to Copenhagen, and sent her into the Downs.

== The second Earl St Vincent ==
The second Earl St Vincent was a cutter of fourteen 12-pounder carronades and 19416/94 tons (bm) that served the Royal Navy from 3 May 1804 until 3 March 1806 when she was returned to her owners. In 1806 her name was changed to St Vincent.

In 1804 she was under the command of Lieutenant William Shepheard, who transferred from Basilisk. (Note: For more on Lieutenant William Shepheard see: O'Byrne, William R. (1849). "Shepheard, William" . A Naval Biographical Dictionary. London: John Murray.) Earl St Vincent left Portsmouth Harbour on 8 May to take an American convoy to the westward. She spent more than two years cruising on the coast of Scotland, around the Orkney and Shetland islands, and in the Baltic. The general promotion following the Battle of Trafalgar missed Lieutenant Shepheard, who complained, but to no immediate avail. Still, on 15 August 1806 he was promoted to the command of Demerara.
