= Gerrit Verdooren van Asperen =

Dutch naval officer (1757–1824)

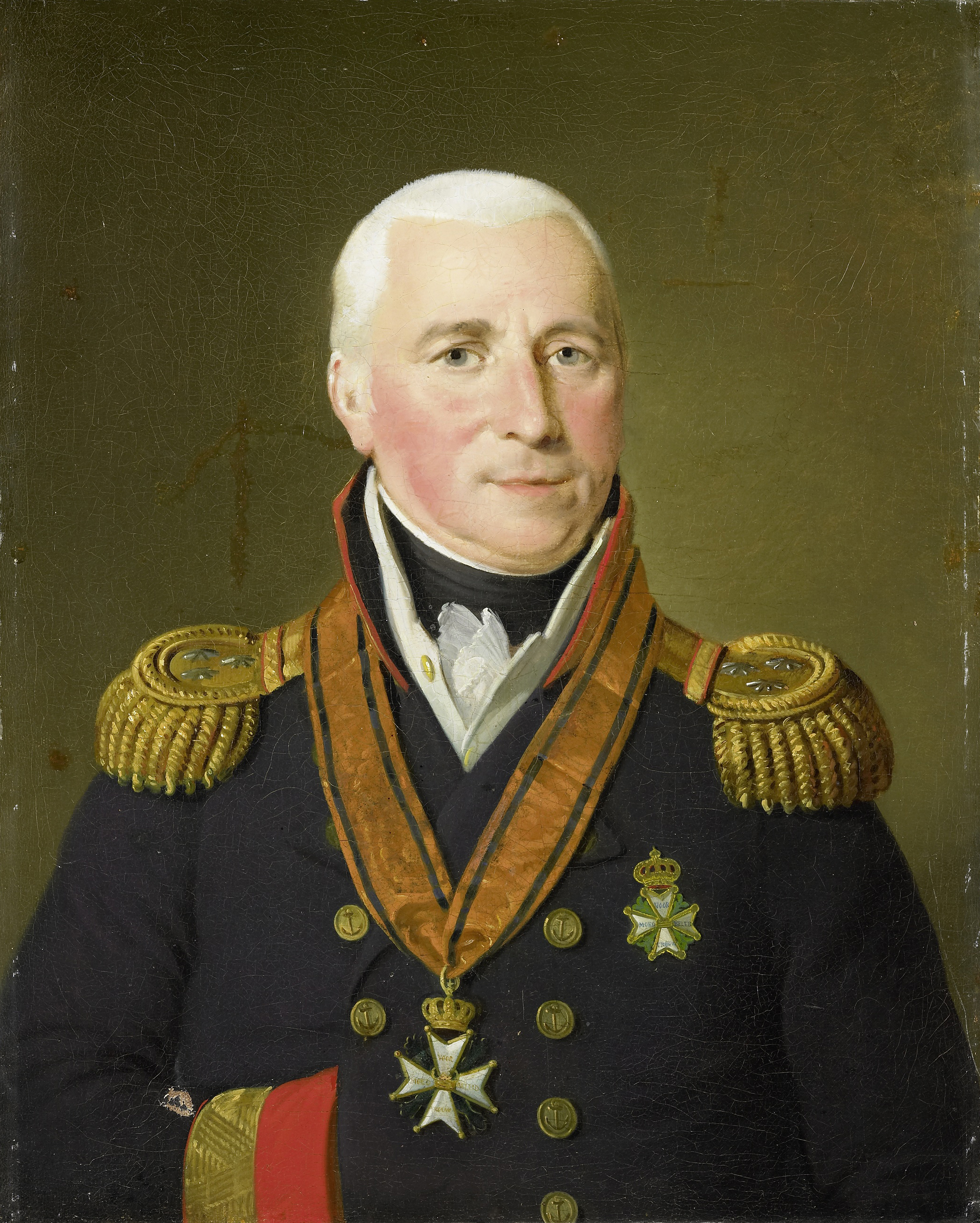
Portrait of van Asperen

Vice-Admiral Gerrit Verdooren van Asperen (9 February 1757 – 30 October 1824) was a Dutch naval officer who served in the French Revolutionary and Napoleonic Wars. He was born in Bergen op Zoom on 9 February 1757. Van Asperen joined the Batavian Navy in 1795, and commanded the 56-gun ship of the line Delft at the Battle of Camperdown against the Royal Navy on 11 October 1797. His ship was captured, and van Asperen was brought to England as a prisoner of war before eventually being released. He later became a schout-bij-nacht in the navy of the Kingdom of Holland. In 1814, Van Asperen was appointed as a vice admiral in the Royal Netherlands Navy after the Kingdom of the Netherlands was established. He died on 30 October 1824 in Oost-Souburg.
