= Dutch ship Hercules =

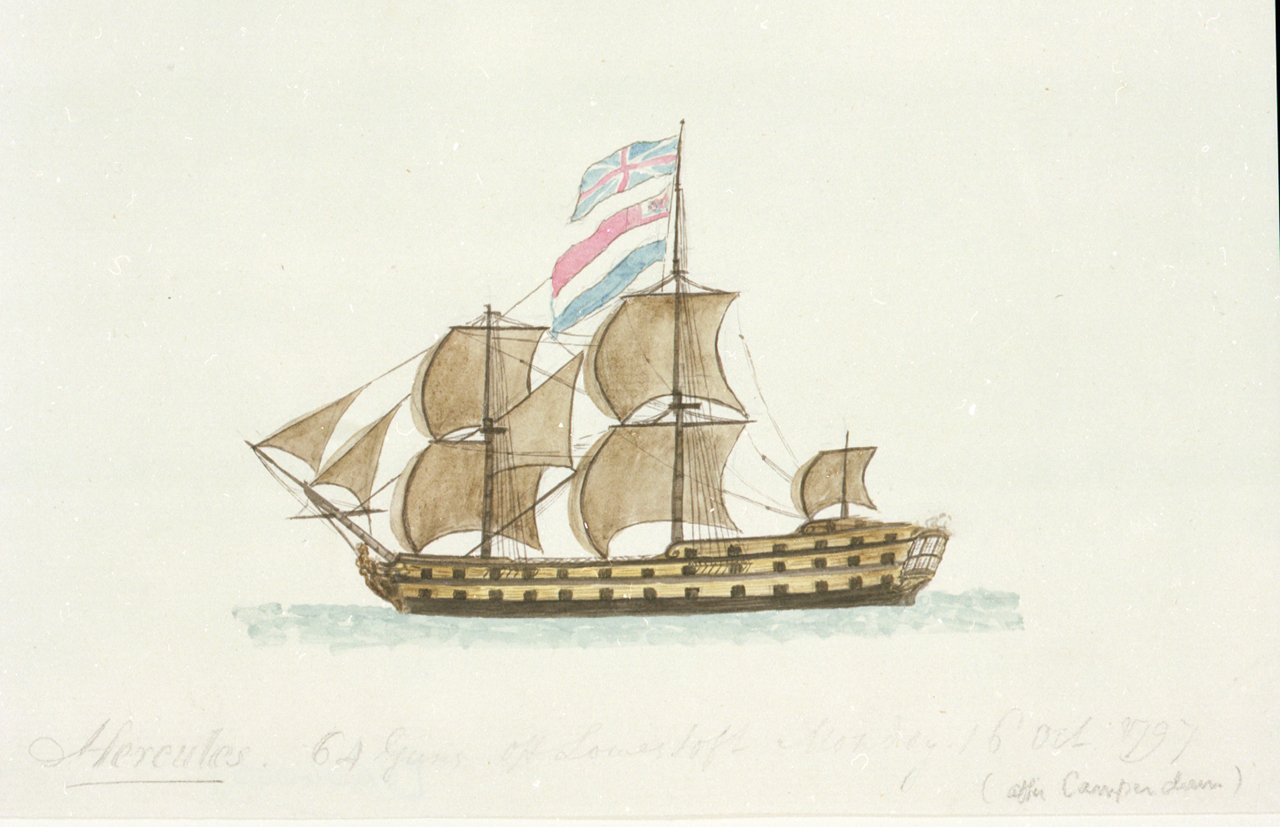
- 1797 illustration of Hercules

History

Dutch Republic
- Name: Hercules
- Laid down: 1781
- Launched: 12 April 1782
- Commissioned: 1782
- Decommissioned: 1795

Batavian Republic
- Name: Hercules
- Commissioned: 1795
- In service: 1795
- Out of service: 1797
- Captured: 11 October 1797
- Fate: Captured

Great Britain
- Name: HMS Delft
- Acquired: 1797
- Commissioned: 1797
- Decommissioned: 1822
- Reclassified: Transport ship in 1799; Prison ship from 1802
- Fate: Sunk as a breakwater in 1822

General characteristics
- Class & type: 68-gun ship of the line
- Propulsion: Sails
- Sail plan: Full-rigged ship
- Armament: 68 guns: Lower gun deck: 26 × 24-pdrs; Upper gun deck: 26 × 18-pdrs; Quarterdeck & Forecastle: 8 × 8-pdrs

Hercules was a 68-gun ship of the line of the Dutch States Navy. The order to construct the ship was given by the Admiralty of Rotterdam in 1781. In 1795, the ship was commissioned in the Batavian Navy. On 11 October 1797 Hercules took part in the Battle of Camperdown under Captain G.J. van Rijsoort. Fire broke out on the ship, and she was eventually captured by the British and renamed HMS Delft, in honour of the brave resistance the ship Delft had made in the battle. In 1799, Delft served as a troopship. She became a prison hulk in 1802, and in 1822 she was sunk to serve as a breakwater close to the town of Harwich.
