= HMS Fitzroy (K553) =

Frigate of the Royal Navy

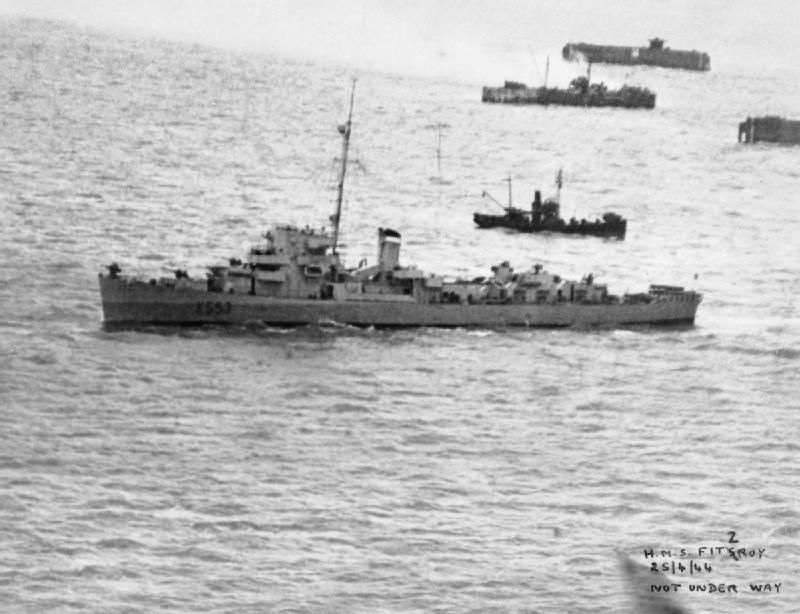
- HMS Fitzroy on 25 April 1944

History

United States
- Name: unnamed (DE-88)
- Ordered: 10 January 1942
- Builder: Bethlehem-Hingham Shipyard, Hingham, Massachusetts
- Laid down: 24 August 1943
- Launched: 1 September 1943
- Completed: 16 October 1943
- Commissioned: never
- Fate: Transferred to United Kingdom 16 October 1943
- Acquired: Returned by United Kingdom 5 January 1946
- Stricken: 7 February 1946
- Fate: Sold for scrapping 23 May 1946

United Kingdom
- Name: HMS Fitzroy (K553)
- Namesake: Vice Admiral Sir Robert FitzRoy (1805–1865), British naval officer who was commanding officer of HMS Beagle during Charles Darwin's voyage of 1831–1836
- Acquired: 16 October 1943
- Commissioned: 16 October 1943
- Decommissioned: 1945
- Fate: Returned to United States 5 January 1946

General characteristics
- Displacement: 1,400 long tons (1,422 t)
- Length: 306 ft (93 m)
- Beam: 36.75 ft (11.2 m)
- Draught: 9 ft (2.7 m)
- Propulsion: Two Foster-Wheeler Express "D"-type water-tube boilers; GE 13,500 shp (10,070 kW) steam turbines and generators (9,200 kW); Electric motors for 12,000 shp (8,900 kW); Two shafts
- Speed: 24 knots (44 km/h)
- Range: 5,500 nautical miles (10,200 km) at 15 knots (28 km/h)
- Complement: 186
- Sensors & processing systems: SA & SL type radars; Type 144 series Asdic; MF Direction Finding antenna; HF Direction Finding Type FH 4 antenna
- Armament: 3 × 3 in (76 mm) /50 Mk.22 guns; 1 × twin Bofors 40 mm mount Mk.I; 7–16 × 20 mm Oerlikon guns; Mark 10 Hedgehog antisubmarine mortar; Depth charges; QF 2-pounder naval gun
- Notes: Pennant number K553

The second HMS Fitzroy (K553) was a British Captain-class frigate of the Royal Navy in commission during World War II. Originally constructed as a United States Navy Buckley-class destroyer escort, she served in the Royal Navy from 1943 to 1945.

== Construction and transfer ==
The ship was laid down as the unnamed U.S. Navy destroyer escort DE-88 by Bethlehem-Hingham Shipyard, Inc., in Hingham, Massachusetts, on 24 August 1943 and launched on 1 September 1943. She was transferred to the United Kingdom upon completion on 16 October 1943.

== Service history ==
Commissioned into service in the Royal Navy as the frigate HMS Fitzroy (K553) on 16 October 1943 simultaneously with her transfer, the ship served on patrol and escort duty. On 27 March 1945 she joined the British frigates HMS Byron (K508) and HMS Redmill (K554) in sinking with depth charges the German submarine U-722 in the North Atlantic Ocean near the Hebrides at 57°09′00″N 006°55′00″W. On 8 April 1945 she joined Byron in a depth-charge attack which sank the German submarine U-1001 in the North Atlantic south-west of Land's End, England, at 49°19′00″N 010°23′00″W.

The Royal Navy decommissioned Fitzroy later in 1945 and returned her to the U.S. Navy on 5 January 1946.

== Disposal ==
The U.S. Navy struck Fitzroy from its Naval Vessel Register on 7 February 1946. She was sold on 23 May 1946 for scrapping.
