= HMS Riou =

WWII frigate

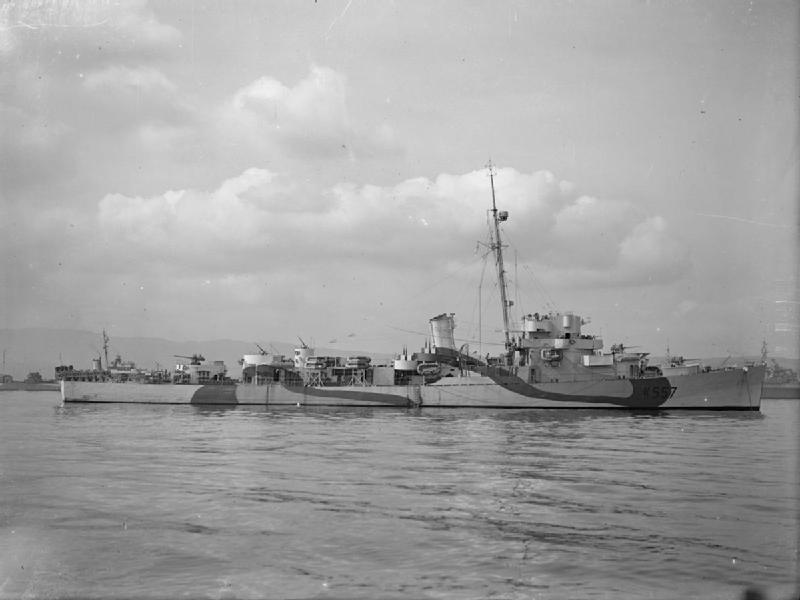
- HMS Riou off Greenock, Scotland, on 22 May 1944.

History

United States
- Name: unnamed (DE-92)
- Ordered: 10 January 1942
- Builder: Bethlehem-Hingham Shipyard, Hingham, Massachusetts
- Laid down: 4 August 1943
- Launched: 23 October 1943
- Completed: 14 December 1943
- Fate: Transferred to United Kingdom 14 December 1943
- Acquired: Returned by United Kingdom 25 February 1946
- Stricken: 28 March 1946
- Fate: Sold for scrapping 21 April 1947

United Kingdom
- Name: HMS Riou (K557)
- Namesake: Captain Edward Riou (1762–1801), British naval officer who was killed in action as commanding officer of HMS Amazon during the Battle of Copenhagen in 1801
- Acquired: 14 December 1943
- Commissioned: 14 December 1943
- Fate: Returned to United States 25 February 1946

General characteristics
- Displacement: 1,400 long tons (1,422 t)
- Length: 306 ft (93 m)
- Beam: 36.75 ft (11.2 m)
- Draught: 9 ft (2.7 m)
- Propulsion: Two Foster-Wheeler Express "D"-type water-tube boilers; GE 13,500 shp (10,070 kW) steam turbines and generators (9,200 kW); Electric motors for 12,000 shp (8,900 kW); Two shafts
- Speed: 24 knots (44 km/h)
- Range: 5,500 nautical miles (10,200 km) at 15 knots (28 km/h)
- Complement: 186
- Sensors & processing systems: SA & SL type radars; Type 144 series Asdic; MF Direction Finding antenna; HF Direction Finding Type FH 4 antenna
- Armament: 3 × 3 in (76 mm) /50 Mk.22 guns; 1 × twin Bofors 40 mm mount Mk.I; 7–16 × 20 mm Oerlikon guns; Mark 10 Hedgehog antisubmarine mortar; Depth charges; QF 2-pounder naval gun

HMS Riou (K557) was a British Captain-class frigate of the Royal Navy in commission during World War II. Originally constructed as a United States Navy Buckley class destroyer escort, she served in the Royal Navy from 1943 to 1945.

== Construction and transfer ==
The ship was laid down as the unnamed U.S. Navy destroyer escort DE-92 by Bethlehem-Hingham Shipyard, Inc., in Hingham, Massachusetts, on 4 August 1943 and launched on 23 October 1943. She was transferred to the United Kingdom upon completion on 14 December 1943.

== Service history ==
Commissioned into service in the Royal Navy as the frigate HMS Riou (K557) on 14 December 1943 simultaneously with her transfer, the ship served on patrol and escort duty for the remainder of World War II.

The Royal Navy returned Riou to the U.S. Navy on 25 February 1946.

== Disposal ==
The U.S. Navy struck Riou from its Naval Vessel Register on 28 March 1946. She was sold on 21 April 1947 for scrapping.
