= Richard Retalick =

Royal Navy officer, born 1759

Captain Richard Retalick
- Born: c. 1759; St Wenn, Cornwall
- Died: 1813 (aged 53–54) Padstow, Cornwall
- Allegiance: Kingdom of Great Britain; United Kingdom
- Branch: Royal Navy
- Commands: HMS Dolphin; HMS Bonne Citoyenne; HMS Africa; Earl St Vincent; HMS Isis; HMS Defiance

Richard Retalick (c. 1759–1813) was a Royal Navy officer who served during the American Revolutionary and French Revolutionary wars. He was promoted to captain in 1798 and commanded HMS Defiance at the Battle of Copenhagen in April 1801

== Early life and career ==
Richard Retalick was born in St Wenn, Cornwall, in about 1759. Little is known of his early exploits, but he was promoted to lieutenant on 6 September 1779 and may have served aboard HMS Bedford during the Spanish Armament of 1790.

== Command ==
As a lieutenant, Retalick took command of HMS Dolphin in January 1794. A 44-gun frigate would normally have required a post-captain but she had been reduced in armament and rerated as a hospital ship. He served aboard her in the Mediterranean, receiving a promotion to Commander in August 1794.

Having been expelled from the Mediterranean by the combined navies of France and Spain, the British Fleet under John Jervis, was stationed off Portugal, when in May 1797, Retalick was appointed to the 22-gun HMS Bonne Citoyenne. In the months that followed, Bonne Citoyenne, made several cruises into the western Mediterranean and took many prizes, including two French privateers of 10 and 16 guns, and two Spanish brigs carrying 8,900 silver dollars. Retalick was promoted to post-captain in 1798.

In May 1798, Rear-Admiral Horatio Nelson wanted Bonne Citoyenne for his stepson, Josiah Nisbet, and moved Retalick to the armed vessel, Earl St Vincent. Retalick acted as a go-between, carrying messages and co-operating with the Portuguese squadron under the Marques de Niza, until he returned to England at the beginning of August.

Following a short spell in HMS Isis, Retalick took command of HMS Defiance on 24 December 1800. It was in the latter ship that he fought at the Battle of Copenhagen on 2 April 1801, as the flag captain of Rear-Admiral Thomas Graves. During the battle, Defiance was stationed at the northern end of the Danish line, near the Trekroner Fort, where, owing to HMS Bellona and HMS Russell going aground early in the battle, she drew more fire than was intended and suffered severe damage. When Admiral Sir Hyde Parker famously signalled to withdraw, Defiance repeated the signal but remained at her station and kept Nelson's signal for close action, flying. Twenty-four of Retalick's crew were killed in the action and a further fifty wounded. During the truce, called to discuss the Danish surrender, the Defiance and the other leading British ships attempted to move out of range but she, along with HMS Elephant became stuck on a shoal about a mile from the fort. Retalick freed his ship by having the drinking water thrown over the side.

With peace with Denmark secure but Napoleon's plans for the invasion of Britain gathering pace, much of the Baltic fleet was sent to bolster the defence of the English Channel. Shortly after Copenhagen, Defiance sailed for Brest.

== Family ==
Richard Retalick married a Phoebe Downall from Portsea in June 1790. Retalick may have fathered a daughter, Elizabeth Dolphina, born in Portsea in 1796. His wife was not the mother, and Elizabeth may even have been a niece, but she was obviously important to Retalick, who named her after his first command and provided an annuity for her in his will.

Retalick was not hugely successful in terms of prize money and following his death, in Padstow, on 28 August 1813, his wife sought financial assistance from The Charity for the Relief of Officers' Widows.

Richard had a younger brother, James, who also served in the Royal Navy. In 1797, James was a lieutenant aboard HMS Monarch and was wounded at the Battle of Camperdown.
