= HMS Byron =

Frigate of the Royal Navy

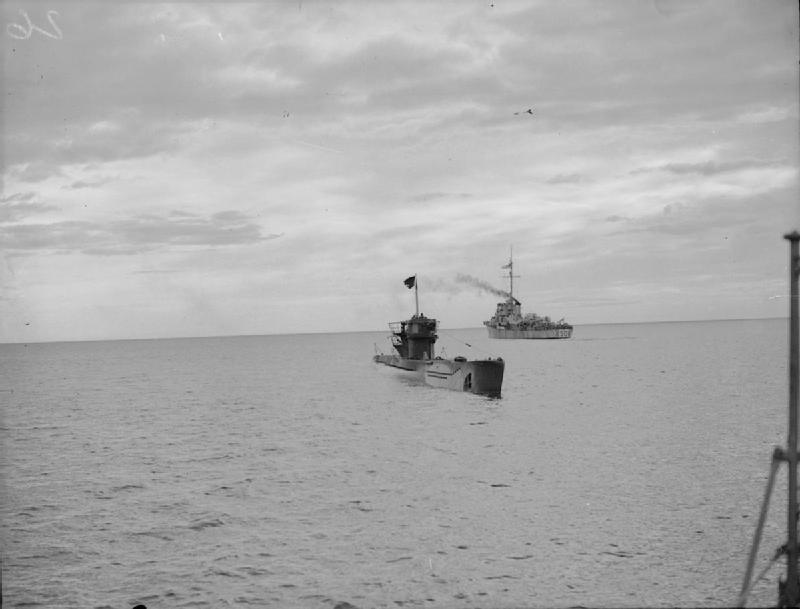
- HMS Byron, background, escorts surrendering German submarine U-1009 into Loch Eriboll, Scotland, May 1945

History

United Kingdom
- Builder: Bethlehem Hingham Shipyard
- Laid down: 24 May 1943
- Launched: 14 August 1943
- Commissioned: 30 October 1943
- Decommissioned: Returned to US Navy on 24 November 1945
- Fate: Struck from the Navy list and sold for scrap on 25 October 1947

General characteristics
- Displacement: 1,800 long tons (1,829 t) fully loaded
- Length: 306 ft (93 m) overall
- Beam: 36.5 ft (11.1 m)
- Draught: 11 ft (3.4 m) fully loaded
- Speed: 24 knots (44 km/h)
- Endurance: 5,500 nautical miles (10,200 km) at 15 knots (28 km/h)
- Complement: Typically between 170 & 186

HMS Byron was a US-built Captain class frigate of the Royal Navy during World War II. Named after Vice Admiral The Honourable John Byron whose frequent encounters with bad weather in ensuing years won him the sobriquet, "Foul Weather Jack". Originally laid down as DE-79, a turbo-electric (TE) type Buckley-class destroyer escort, she was diverted to the Royal Navy and named HMS Byron before the launch.

== Actions ==
During World War II, HMS Byron earned battle honours for service in the English Channel, the Arctic, and the Atlantic in 1944 and in the North Sea in 1944 and 1945. In the course of these operations, she participated in the destruction of two German U-boats: U-722 on 27 March 1945 off the Hebrides, in position 57°09′N 06°55′W, by depth charges in company with HMS Fitzroy and HMS Redmill; and, teaming with HMS Fitzroy, U-1001 on 8 April 1945 south-west of Land's End, in position 49°19′N 10°23′W, by depth charges.

== General information ==
- Pennant (UK): K 508
- Hull number (US): DE 79
- Built by: Bethlehem-Hingham Shipyard Inc. (Hingham, Massachusetts, U.S.A.)
