= HMS Narborough (K578) =

Frigate of the Royal Navy

History

United States
- Name: unnamed (DE-569)
- Builder: Bethlehem-Hingham Shipyard, Hingham, Massachusetts
- Laid down: 6 October 1943
- Launched: 27 November 1943
- Completed: 21 January 1944
- Fate: Transferred to United Kingdom 21 January 1944
- Acquired: Returned by United Kingdom 4 February 1946
- Fate: Sold for scrapping 14 December 1946

United Kingdom
- Name: HMS Narborough
- Namesake: Rear Admiral Sir John Narborough (ca. 1640-1688), English naval officer who saw action during the Third Anglo-Dutch War of 1672-1674
- Acquired: 21 January 1944
- Commissioned: 21 January 1944
- Identification: Pennant number K578
- Fate: Returned to United States 4 February 1946

General characteristics
- Class & type: Captain-class frigate
- Displacement: 1,400 long tons (1,422 t)
- Length: 306 ft (93 m)
- Beam: 36.75 ft (11.2 m)
- Draught: 9 ft (2.7 m)
- Propulsion: Two Foster-Wheeler Express "D"-type water-tube boilers; GE 13,500 shp (10,070 kW) steam turbines and generators (9,200 kW); Electric motors for 12,000 shp (8,900 kW); Two shafts
- Speed: 24 knots (44 km/h)
- Range: 5,500 nautical miles (10,200 km) at 15 knots (28 km/h)
- Complement: 186
- Sensors & processing systems: SA & SL type radars; Type 144 series Asdic; MF Direction Finding antenna; HF Direction Finding Type FH 4 antenna
- Armament: 3 × 3 in (76 mm) /50 Mk.22 guns; 1 × twin Bofors 40 mm mount Mk.I; 7–16 × 20 mm Oerlikon guns; Mark 10 Hedgehog antisubmarine mortar; Depth charges; QF 2-pounder naval gun

The second HMS Narborough (K578) was a British Captain-class frigate of the Royal Navy in commission during World War II. Originally constructed as a United States Navy Buckley class destroyer escort, she served in the Royal Navy from 1944 to 1946.

== Construction and transfer ==
The ship was laid down as the unnamed U.S. Navy destroyer escort DE-569 by Bethlehem-Hingham Shipyard, Inc., in Hingham, Massachusetts, on 6 October 1943 and launched on 27 November 1943. She was transferred to the United Kingdom upon completion on 21 January 1944.

== Service history ==
Commissioned into service in the Royal Navy as the frigate HMS Narborough (K578) on 21 January 1944 simultaneously with her transfer, the ship served on patrol and escort duty for the remainder of World War II.

The Royal Navy returned Narborough to the U.S. Navy on 4 February 1946.

== Disposal ==
Narborough was sold on 14 December 1946 for scrapping.
