= HMS Kingsmill (K484) =

Frigate of the Royal Navy

History

United States
- Name: unnamed (DE-280)
- Ordered: 25 January 1942
- Builder: Boston Navy Yard, Boston, Massachusetts
- Laid down: 9 July 1943
- Launched: 13 August 1943
- Completed: 6 November 1943
- Fate: Transferred to United Kingdom 29 October 1943
- Acquired: Returned by United Kingdom 22 August 1945
- Name: USS Kingsmill (DE-280)
- Namesake: British name retained
- Commissioned: 22 August 1945
- Decommissioned: 26 October 1945
- Stricken: 16 November 1945
- Fate: Sold 17 February 1947 for scrapping

United Kingdom
- Name: HMS Kingsmill (K484)
- Namesake: Admiral Sir Robert Kingsmill, 1st Baronet (1730–1805), British naval officer who was commanding officer of HMS Vigilant at the Battle of Ushant in 1778
- Acquired: 29 October 1943
- Commissioned: 29 October 1943
- Decommissioned: 1945
- Fate: Returned to United States 22 August 1945

General characteristics
- Displacement: 1,140 long tons (1,158 t)
- Length: 289.5 ft (88.2 m)
- Beam: 35 ft (11 m)
- Draught: 9 ft (2.7 m)
- Propulsion: Four General Motors 278A 16-cylinder engines; GE 7,040 bhp (5,250 kW) generators (4,800 kW); GE electric motors for 6,000 shp (4,500 kW); Two shafts
- Speed: 20 knots (37 km/h)
- Range: 5,000 nautical miles (9,260 km) at 15 knots (28 km/h)
- Complement: 156
- Sensors & processing systems: SA & SL type radars; Type 144 series Asdic; MF Direction Finding antenna; HF Direction Finding Type FH 4 antenna
- Armament: 3 × 3 in (76 mm) /50 Mk.22 guns; 1 × twin Bofors 40 mm mount Mk.I; 7–16 × 20 mm Oerlikon guns; Mark 10 Hedgehog antisubmarine mortar; Depth charges; QF 2-pounder naval gun

HMS Kingsmill (K484) was a British Captain-class frigate of the Royal Navy in commission during World War II. Originally constructed as the United States Navy Evarts-class destroyer escort DE-280, she served in the Royal Navy from 1943 to 1945 and then in the U.S. Navy as USS Kingsmill (DE-280) from August to October 1945.

== Construction and transfer ==
The ship was ordered on 25 January 1942 as the U.S. Navy destroyer escort DE-280. She was laid down by the Boston Navy Yard in Boston, Massachusetts, on 9 July 1943 and launched on 13 August 1943. The United States transferred her to the United Kingdom under Lend-Lease on 29 October 1943.

== Service history ==
=== Royal Navy, 1943-1945 ===
The ship was commissioned into service in the Royal Navy as HMS Kingsmill (K484) on 29 October 1943 simultaneously with her transfer. She served on patrol and escort duty in the English Channel during World War II. In addition, she supported the invasion of Normandy on 6 June 1944 and took part in Operation Infatuate, the British and Canadian invasion of Walcheren Island in the Netherlands, in November 1944.

The Royal Navy returned Kingsmill to the U.S. Navy on 22 August 1945 at Harwich, England.

=== U.S. Navy, 1945 ===
The ship was commissioned into the U.S. Navy as USS Kingsmill (DE-280) at Harwich on 22 August 1945 simultaneously with her return. She departed Harwich on 26 August 1945 and steamed to the Philadelphia Naval Shipyard in Philadelphia, Pennsylvania, where she arrived on 8 September 1945. She remained there until she was decommissioned on 26 October 1945.

== Disposal ==
The U.S. Navy struck Kingsmill from its Naval Vessel Register on 16 November 1945. She was sold on 17 February 1947 for scrapping.
