= HMS Duckworth (K351) =

Frigate of the Royal Navy

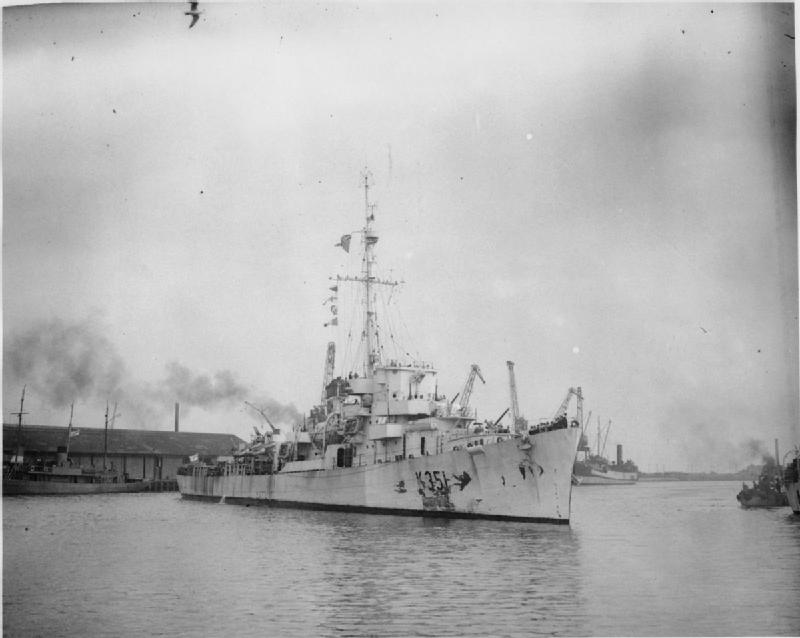
- HMS Duckworth (K351) at Belfast, April 1945

History

United States
- Name: Gary
- Namesake: Thomas J. Gary
- Ordered: 10 January 1942
- Laid down: 16 January 1943
- Launched: 1 May 1943
- Stricken: 21 January 1946
- Identification: DE-61
- Fate: Transferred to Royal Navy under Lend-Lease 4 August 1943

United Kingdom
- Name: Duckworth
- Namesake: Sir John Duckworth
- Commissioned: 1943
- Decommissioned: 1946
- Identification: K351
- Fate: Returned to US and scrapped 1946

General characteristics
- Class & type: Captain-class frigate
- Displacement: 1,300 tons
- Length: 306 ft (93 m)
- Beam: 36 ft 9 in (11.20 m)
- Draught: 10 ft 9 in (3.28 m)
- Propulsion: 2 shaft GE turbines; 2 boilers=12,000shp
- Speed: 24 knots (44 km/h)
- Range: 6,000 nmi (11,000 km) at 12 kn (22 km/h)
- Complement: 186
- Sensors & processing systems: HF/DF; MF/DF; Type 244 Radar
- Armament: 3 × 3in guns; 8 × 20mm cannon; 2 × 21in TT; 1 × Hedgehog; 8 × DCT; 2 × DC racks

HMS Duckworth (K351) was a Captain-class frigate of the Royal Navy. She served during the Second World War as a convoy escort and anti-submarine warfare vessel in the Battle of the Atlantic and was an effective U-boat killer, being credited with the destruction of five U-boats during the conflict.

== Construction ==
Duckworth was ordered on 10 January 1942, as DE-61, long-hulled turbo-diesel (TE) type destroyer escort, one of more than 500 such vessels built for ASW to a collaborative British-American design. Laid down on 16 January 1943, by the Bethlehem Hingham Shipyard, in Massachusetts, she was launched on 1 May 1943, as USS Gary in honour of Thomas J. Gary, a Texan who died in the attack on Pearl Harbor. She was transferred to the Royal Navy under Lend-Lease on completion on 4 August 1943, and named for John Thomas Duckworth, a RN officer of the late 18th and early 19th centuries. She replaced a previous Duckworth, numbered BDE-19, which was commissioned into the US Navy as Burden R. Hastings. Duckworth's pennant number was K351.

== Service history ==
After commissioning Duckworth was assigned to Western Approaches Command, as the senior officer's ship of 3rd Escort Group.

On her first transatlantic convoy Duckworth was involved in the battle around convoy SC 143, which saw one warship and one merchant ship sunk, for the destruction of three U-boats. On 9 October Duckworth was able to assist in saving survivors from Yorkmar, the merchant ship lost.

Duckworth and 3EG were active throughout the remainder of the Atlantic campaign, as a support group and on ASW patrol.

On 13 February 1944, while on patrol, Duckworth was attacked by U-445, which fired a torpedo at her and missed. Duckworth counterattacked, damaging U-445, which was forced to return to base.

On 15 June off Cap de la Hague 3EG was attacked by U-764, which torpedoed Blackwood. Duckworth and Domett counter-attacked, damaging U-764 which escaped to Brest.

On 29 June the group followed up an attack by an RAF Liberator on a U-boat in the Channel west of Guernsey. A search by Duckworth and the group found and destroyed U-988, their first success.

On 14 August joined an attack by an RAF Liberator on U-618 in the Bay of Biscay, west of St. Nazaire. Duckworth and Essington carried out a series of attacks which destroyed U-618.

in October 1944 3EG were assigned to Arctic convoys JW 61 and JW 61A, with several other Western Approaches groups. Though JW 61 came under attack by group Panther it suffered no hits and no losses; all ships arrived safely. On the return 3EG assisted the passage of RA 61 by sweeping the Kola inlet ahead of the convoy; during this operation Mounsey of 15EG was torpedoed, she survived but was later declared a constructive total loss. Both RA 61 and RA 61A returned without interference.

In December 1944 and into the new year Duckworth and 3EG were on patrol and escort duty in the Irish Sea but had little success.

On 24 February 1945, following an attack on coastal convoy BTC 78, Duckworth along with her sister ship HMS Rowley, another frigate of the Captain class, found and destroyed the U-boat responsible after a six-hour hunt. This vessel was identified post-war as the German U Boat U-480 and was thought to be sunk in the English Channel between Land's End and the Scilly Isles. However, further research following the discovery of a wreck destroyed by an underwater mine at a later time near Poole identified that vessel as U-480, and the U-boat destroyed on 24 February is now thought to be U-1208, which was dived and identified by nautical archaeologist Innes McCartney in 2005.

On 26 March, following an attack on BTC 108, Duckworth and 3EG found U-399 southwest of the Lizard and destroyed her with a Hedgehog attack.

On 29 March following an attack on BTC 111 Duckworth found and attacked a U-boat in Mount's Bay and destroyed it. This was later identified as U-246, though recent research has suggested it was in fact U-1169.

Duckworth was returned to the US after the war and scrapped in 1946.

== Battle honours ==
Duckworth earned the following battle honours for service:

- Atlantic 1943–44
- Arctic 1944
- Normandy 1944
- English Channel 1945

== Successes ==
During her service Duckworth was credited with the destruction of five U-boats.

Date	U-boat	Type	Location	Notes
30 June 1944	U-988	VIIC	English Channel; 49°37′N 03°41′W	attacked by Lib L/224, Essington, Duckworth, Domett, Cooke in the English Channel/west of Guernsey
15 August 1944	U-618	VIIC	Biscay; 47°22′N 04°39′W	attacked by Lib G/53 and units of EG3/Duckworth, Essington
24 February 1945	Was thought to be U-480 now thought to be U-1208	VIIC	Channel, SW of Lands End; 49°55′N 06°08′W	attacked by Duckworth, Rowley
26 March 1945	U-399	VIIC	Channel, SW of Lizard; 49°56′N 05°22′W	attacked by units of 3EG, sunk by Duckworth
29 March 1945	Believed to be U-246 more probably U-1169	VII/C41	Channel, S of Lizard; 49°58′N 05°25′W	sunk by Duckworth
