= HMS Cooke =

Frigate of the Royal Navy

History

United States
- Name: USS Dempsey (DE-267)
- Namesake: U.S. Navy Lieutenant, junior grade Richard John Dempsey (1919-1942), killed in action aboard the heavy cruiser USS Vincennes (CA-44) when she was sunk in the Battle of Savo Island
- Ordered: 25 January 1942
- Builder: Boston Navy Yard, Boston, Massachusetts
- Laid down: 11 March 1943
- Launched: 22 April 1943
- Fate: Transferred to United Kingdom 23 August 1943
- Acquired: Returned by United Kingdom 5 March 1946
- Fate: Sold 3 or 10 June 1947 for scrapping

United Kingdom
- Name: HMS Cooke
- Namesake: Captain John Cooke (c. 1762-1805), British naval officer killed in action as commanding officer of HMS Bellerophon at the Battle of Trafalgar in 1805
- Acquired: 23 August 1943
- Commissioned: 23 August 1943
- Fate: Returned to United States 5 March 1946

General characteristics
- Class & type: Captain class frigate
- Displacement: 1,140 long tons (1,158 t)
- Length: 289.5 ft (88.2 m)
- Beam: 35 ft (11 m)
- Draught: 9 ft (2.7 m)
- Propulsion: Four General Motors 278A 16-cylinder engines; GE 7,040 bhp (5,250 kW) generators (4,800 kW); GE electric motors for 6,000 shp (4,500 kW); Two shafts
- Speed: 20 knots (37 km/h)
- Range: 5,000 nautical miles (9,260 km) at 15 knots (28 km/h)
- Complement: 156
- Sensors & processing systems: SA & SL type radars; Type 144 series Asdic; MF Direction Finding antenna; HF Direction Finding Type FH 4 antenna
- Armament: 3 × 3 in (76 mm) /50 Mk.22 guns; 1 × twin Bofors 40 mm mount Mk.I; 7–16 × 20 mm Oerlikon guns; Mark 10 Hedgehog antisubmarine mortar; Depth charges; QF 2-pounder naval gun
- Notes: Pennant number K471

HMS Cooke (K471) was a British Captain-class frigate of the Royal Navy in commission during World War II. Originally constructed as the United States Navy Evarts-class destroyer escort USS Dempsey (DE-267), she served in the Royal Navy from 1943 to 1946.

== Construction and transfer ==
The ship was laid down as the U.S. Navy destroyer escort USS Dempsey (DE-267), the first ship of the name, by the Boston Navy Yard in Boston, Massachusetts, on 11 March 1943 and launched on 22 April 1943, sponsored by Mrs. J. A. Dempsey, mother of the late Lieutenant, junior grade Richard John Dempsey (1919–1942), for whom the ship was named. Dempsey was transferred to the United Kingdom under Lend-Lease upon completion on 23 August 1943.

== Service history ==
Commissioned into service in the Royal Navy as HMS Cooke (K471) on 23 August 1943 simultaneously with her transfer, the ship served on patrol and escort duty. On 29 June 1944 she joined the British frigates Domett, Duckworth, and Essington and a Royal Air Force Liberator aircraft of No. 244 Squadron in a depth charge attack that sank the German submarine U-988 in the English Channel west of Guernsey at 49°37′00″N 003°41′00″W. On 26 July 1944, she sank the German submarine U-214 with depth charges in the English Channel southeast of the Eddystone Rocks in position 49°58′00″N 003°30′00″W.

The Royal Navy returned Cooke to the U.S. Navy on 5 March 1946.

== Disposal ==
The United States sold Cooke on 3 or 10 June 1947 (sources vary) for scrapping.
