= HMS Mounsey =

Two ships of the Royal Navy have borne the name HMS Mounsey, after Captain William Mounsey:

- HMS Mounsey (1915) was a Yarrow M-class destroyer launched in 1915 and sold in 1921.
- HMS Mounsey (K569) was a Captain-class frigate launched in 1943 and returned to the US Navy in 1946.
