= HMS Domett =

Frigate of the Royal Navy

History

United States
- Name: USS Eisner (DE-269)
- Ordered: 25 January 1942
- Builder: Boston Navy Yard, Boston, Massachusetts
- Laid down: 7 April 1943
- Launched: 19 May 1943
- Commissioned: Never
- Fate: Transferred to United Kingdom 3 September 1943
- Acquired: Returned by United Kingdom 5 March 1946
- Fate: Sold for scrapping, 3 June 1947

United Kingdom
- Name: HMS Domett (K473)
- Namesake: Admiral Sir William Domett
- Acquired: 3 September 1943
- Commissioned: 3 September 1943
- Identification: Pennant number: K473
- Fate: Returned to United States, 5 March 1946

General characteristics
- Displacement: 1,190 long tons (1,210 t) (standard)
- Length: 289 ft 5 in (88.2 m)
- Beam: 35 ft 2 in (10.7 m)
- Draught: 10 ft 1 in (3.1 m)
- Installed power: 6,000 shp (4,500 kW) electric motors
- Propulsion: 2 shafts; 4 diesel engines
- Speed: 20 knots (37 km/h; 23 mph)
- Range: 6,000 nmi (11,000 km; 6,900 mi) at 12 knots (22 km/h; 14 mph)
- Complement: 198
- Sensors & processing systems: SA & SL type radars; Type 144 series Asdic; MF Direction Finding; HF Direction Finding
- Armament: 3 × single 3 in (76 mm)/50 Mk 22 guns; 1 × twin Bofors 40 mm; 9 × single 20 mm Oerlikon guns; 1 × Hedgehog anti-submarine mortar; 2 × Depth charge rails and four throwers

HMS Domett (K473) was a British Captain-class frigate of the Royal Navy built during World War II. Originally constructed as the United States Navy Evarts-class destroyer escort USS Eisner (DE-269), she served in the Royal Navy from 1943 to 1946.

== Description ==
The Evarts-class ships had an overall length of 289 feet 5 inches (88.2 m), a beam of 35 feet 2 inches (10.7 m), and a draught of 10 feet 1 inch (3.1 m) at full load. They displaced 1,190 long tons (1,210 t) at (standard) and 1,416 long tons (1,439 t) at full load. The ships had a diesel–electric powertrain derived from a submarine propulsion system with four General Motors 16-cylinder diesel engines providing power to four General Electric electric generators which sent electricity to four 1,500-shaft-horsepower (1,100 kW) General Electric electric motors which drove the two propeller shafts. The destroyer escorts had enough power give them a speed of 20 knots (37 km/h; 23 mph) and enough fuel oil to give them a range of 6,000 nautical miles (11,000 km; 6,900 mi) at 12 knots (22 km/h; 14 mph). Their crew consisted of 198 officers and ratings.

The armament of the Evarts-class ships in British service consisted of three single mounts for 50-caliber 3-inch (76 mm)/50 Mk 22 dual-purpose guns; one superfiring pair forward of the bridge and the third gun aft of the superstructure. Anti-aircraft defence was intended to consisted of a twin-gun mount for 40-millimetre (1.6 in) Bofors anti-aircraft (AA) guns atop the rear superstructure with nine 20-millimetre (0.8 in) Oerlikon AA guns located on the superstructure, but production shortages meant that that not all guns were fitted, or that additional Oerlikons replaced the Bofors guns. A Mark 10 Hedgehog anti-submarine mortar was positioned just behind the forward gun. The ships were also equipped with two depth charge rails at the stern and four "K-gun" depth charge throwers.

== Construction and career ==
The ship was assigned the name USS Eisner on 23 February 1943 and laid down as the U.S. Navy destroyer escort DE-269 by the Boston Navy Yard in Boston, Massachusetts, on 7 April 1943. She was launched on 19 May 1943 and transferred to the United Kingdom under Lend-Lease. Commissioned into service in the Royal Navy as HMS Domett (K473) on 3 September 1943 simultaneously with her transfer, the ship served on patrol and escort duty. On 29 June 1944 she joined the British frigates Cooke, Duckworth, and Essington and a Royal Air Force Liberator aircraft of No. 244 Squadron in a depth charge attack that sank the German submarine U-988 in the English Channel west of Guernsey at 49°37′00″N 003°41′00″W.

The Royal Navy returned Domett to the U.S. Navy on 5 March 1946 and the ship was sold for scrap on 3 June 1947.
