= HMS Essington (K353) =

Frigate of the Royal Navy

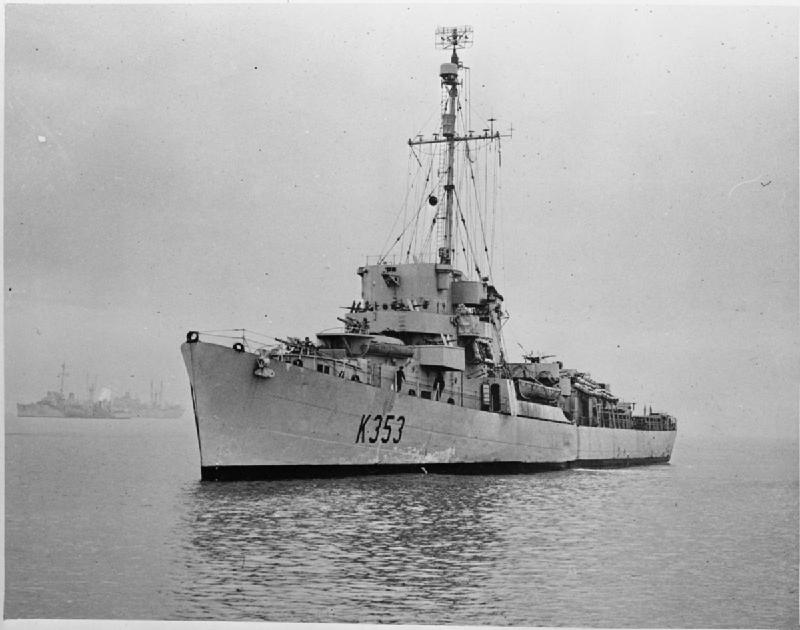
- HMS Essington on 19 February 1944

History

United States
- Name: unnamed (DE-67)
- Ordered: 10 January 1942
- Builder: Bethlehem-Hingham Shipyard, Hingham, Massachusetts
- Laid down: 15 March 1943
- Launched: 19 June 1943
- Completed: 7 September 1943
- Commissioned: Never
- Fate: Transferred to United Kingdom 7 September 1943
- Acquired: Returned by United Kingdom 19 October 1945
- Stricken: 5 December 1945
- Fate: Sold for scrapping 22 December 1945

United Kingdom
- Name: HMS Essington (K353)
- Namesake: Rear Admiral Sir William Essington (1753-1816), British naval officer who commanded from his flagship HMS Triumph at the Battle of Camperdown in 1797
- Acquired: 7 September 1943
- Commissioned: 7 September 1943
- Decommissioned: 1945
- Honours and awards: Battle honours for Biscay 1943-1944, Atlantic 1943-1945, Arctic 1944, Normandy 1944, and English Channel 1944-1945
- Fate: Returned to United States 19 October 1945

General characteristics
- Class & type: Captain-class frigate
- Displacement: 1,400 long tons (1,422 t)
- Length: 306 ft (93 m)
- Beam: 36.75 ft (11.2 m)
- Draught: 9 ft (2.7 m)
- Propulsion: Two Foster-Wheeler Express "D"-type water-tube boilers; GE 13,500 shp (10,070 kW) steam turbines and generators (9,200 kW); Electric motors for 12,000 shp (8,900 kW); Two shafts
- Speed: 24 knots (44 km/h)
- Range: 5,500 nautical miles (10,200 km) at 15 knots (28 km/h)
- Complement: 186
- Sensors & processing systems: SA & SL type radars; Type 144 series Asdic; MF Direction Finding antenna; HF Direction Finding Type FH 4 antenna
- Armament: 3 × 3 in (76 mm) /50 Mk.22 guns; 1 × twin Bofors 40 mm mount Mk.I; 7–16 × 20 mm Oerlikon guns; Mark 10 Hedgehog antisubmarine mortar; Depth charges; QF 2-pounder naval gun
- Notes: Pennant number K353

The second HMS Essington (K353), and the first ship of the name to see service, was a British Captain-class frigate of the Royal Navy in commission during World War II. Originally constructed as a United States Navy Buckley-class destroyer escort, she served in the Royal Navy from 1943 to 1945.

== Construction and transfer ==
The ship was laid down as a U.S. Navy destroyer escort designated DE-67 by Bethlehem-Hingham Shipyard, Inc., in Hingham, Massachusetts, on 15 March 1943 and launched on 19 June 1943. She was transferred to the United Kingdom upon completion on 7 September 1943.

== Service history ==
Commissioned into service in the Royal Navy as the frigate HMS Essington (K353) on 7 September 1943 simultaneously with her transfer, the ship began acceptance trials in Casco Bay in Maine. After passing her trials, she proceeded to Bermuda in October 1943 for shakedown and additional crew training. Once that was complete, she proceeded in early November 1943 from Bermuda to St. John's in the Dominion of Newfoundland, where she was assigned to the escort of a convoy bound for the United Kingdom which departed St. John's on 8 November 1943. During the transatlantic passage, she was detached and reassigned to the escort of Convoy MKS 30/SL 139, then under attack in the North Atlantic Ocean by German submarines of the Schill wolfpack, against which she was in combat by 21 November 1943.

After detaching from the escort, Essington proceeded to Belfast, Northern Ireland, where she entered a shipyard in December 1943 to undergo modifications for Royal Navy service. These changes were completed on 25 December 1943, and she was assigned to the 3rd Escort Group with her sister ships HMS Blackwood (K313), HMS Cooke (K471), HMS Domett (K473), and HMS Duckworth (K351), based at Belfast.

Soon after taking up her new duties, Essington was assigned to special duty and departed Belfast along with other ships of her escort group in early January 1944 bound for Scapa Flow in the Orkney Islands. She departed Scapa Flow on 5 January 1944 as part of the escort for a naval force that had been assigned to the British Eastern Fleet at Colombo, Ceylon, consisting of the battleships HMS Valiant and HMS Queen Elizabeth, the battlecruiser HMS Renown, and the aircraft carriers HMS Illustrious and HMS Unicorn (I72) . The ships arrived at Gibraltar on 7 January 1944 after a rough passage, then proceeded across the Mediterranean Sea to the Suez Canal, arriving at Suez, Egypt, on 12 January 1944. There Essington and the other ships of the 3rd Escort Group were detached from the escort.

On 14 January 1944, Essington and the other ships of the 3rd Escort Group began their return passage to the United Kingdom as escorts for the battleship HMS Ramillies, which was on her way from the Eastern Fleet to prepare for her new assignment of supporting the Allied invasion of Normandy planned for June 1944. The ships crossed the Mediterranean, called at Gibraltar on 20 January 1944, and then proceeded to the United Kingdom, with Essington making an unsuccessful attack during the voyage on a submarine contact in the Western Approaches on 26 January 1944.

In February 1944, the 3rd Escort Group returned to Belfast to resume its normal convoy defense duties in the North Atlantic. Essington deployed with the group on antisubmarine patrol duties in the Northwestern Approaches on 21 February 1944, returning to Belfast on 26 February 1944, and conducted another patrol operation in the Northwestern Approaches from 9 March to 5 April 1944, when Essington began a maintenance period. After the completion of repairs later in April, she deployed for antisubmarine duties in the Southwestern Approaches and English Channel which lasted into May 1944, called at Devonport Dockyard for replenishment, and returned to Belfast on 15 May 1944.

In June 1944, the 3rd Escort Group was assigned to the defense of the Allied beachhead at Normandy from interference by German submarines. Essington and the rest of the escort group deployed in the English Channel for these duties on 7 June 1944, the day after the initial landings. On 29 June 1944 she joined Cooke, Domett, Duckworth and a Royal Air Force Liberator aircraft of No. 244 Squadron in a depth-charge attack that sank the German submarine U-988 in the English Channel west of Guernsey at 49°37′00″N 003°41′00″W. Blackwood was torpedoed and sunk by a German submarine during the English Channel deployment, but Essington and the rest of the group returned to Belfast on 6 July 1944.

On 11 July 1944, the 3rd Escort Group departed Belfast for another deployment in defense of the Normandy beachhead and resumed antisubmarine patrols in the English Channel on 12 July 1944. Initially based at Plymouth, the group was rebased at Devonport in August 1944. On 14 August 1944, Essington and Duckworth responded to the sighting of a German submarine by a Liberator aircraft of the Royal Air Force's No. 53 Squadron in the Bay of Biscay west of St. Nazaire, France, and the two frigates depth-charged a bottomed target. They and the Liberator were credited with the sinking of the German submarine U-618, which was lost with all hands, at position 47°22′00″N 004°39′00″W. The 3rd Escort Group returned to Belfast on 22 August 1944.

Essington deployed with the rest of the 3rd Escort Group on antisubmarine patrol duties in the Western Approaches from 1 to 21 September 1944 before returning to Belfast, where Temporary Acting Lieutenant Commander Stanley Lampard, RNVR, relieved Lambert of command of the ship on 29 September 1944.

In October 1944, the 3rd Escort Group was assigned to detached service with the Home Fleet in defence of Arctic convoys bound for the Soviet Union. Essington steamed from Belfast to Loch Ewe, Scotland, for this assignment on 18 October 1944, and from 19 to 27 October 1944 operated in defense of Convoys JW 61 and JW 61A in the North Atlantic Ocean and Barents Sea before arriving at Polyarny in the Soviet Union on 28 October 1944. On 30 October 1944 she steamed out of Polyarny in advance of Convoy RA 61's departure from the Kola Inlet to attack German submarines gathering to oppose RA 61's passage, and in early November 1944 defended RA 61 itself before returning to Murmansk with the other ships of the 3rd Escort Group on 3 November 1944. The escort group departed Murmansk on 9 November 1944 and returned to Belfast on 16 November 1944.

During December 1944, Essington deployed with the 3rd Escort Group for antisubmarine patrols in the Irish Sea, but her participation was cut short when a fire broke out in her electric switchboard and she had to return to Belfast for repairs. In January 1945 she returned to operations in the Irish Sea, including special operations designed to counter German snorkel-equipped submarines in the vicinity of St. George's Channel. After a maintenance period in Belfast she began antisubmarine patrols in the Southwestern Approaches and the English Channel, continuing them until May 1945, when Germany surrendered.

In May 1945, the Royal Navy decided to assign Essington to duty with the British Pacific Fleet, which required her to receive new communications equipment for her anticipated duties. Her refit to install the equipment began in June 1945 and was still in progress when the armistice with Japan of 15 August 1945 brought World War II to a close and prompted the termination of her refit and cancellation of her transfer to the Pacific. She returned to Belfast that month.

The Royal Navy steamed Essington to the United States in October 1945 and returned her along with her sister ship HMS Calder (K349) to the U.S. Navy on 19 October 1945.

== Disposal ==
The U.S. Navy struck Essington from its Naval Vessel Register on 5 December 1945. She was sold on 22 December 1945 for scrapping.
