= Domett =

Domett may refer to:

- Alfred Domett (1811-1887), British colonial statesman and poet
- William Domett (1752–1828), British admiral
- HMS Domett (K473), a British frigate which served in the Royal Navy from 1943 ro 1946
