= RAF Masirah =

Former RAF station in Oman

RAF Masirah
- Masirah Island in Oman
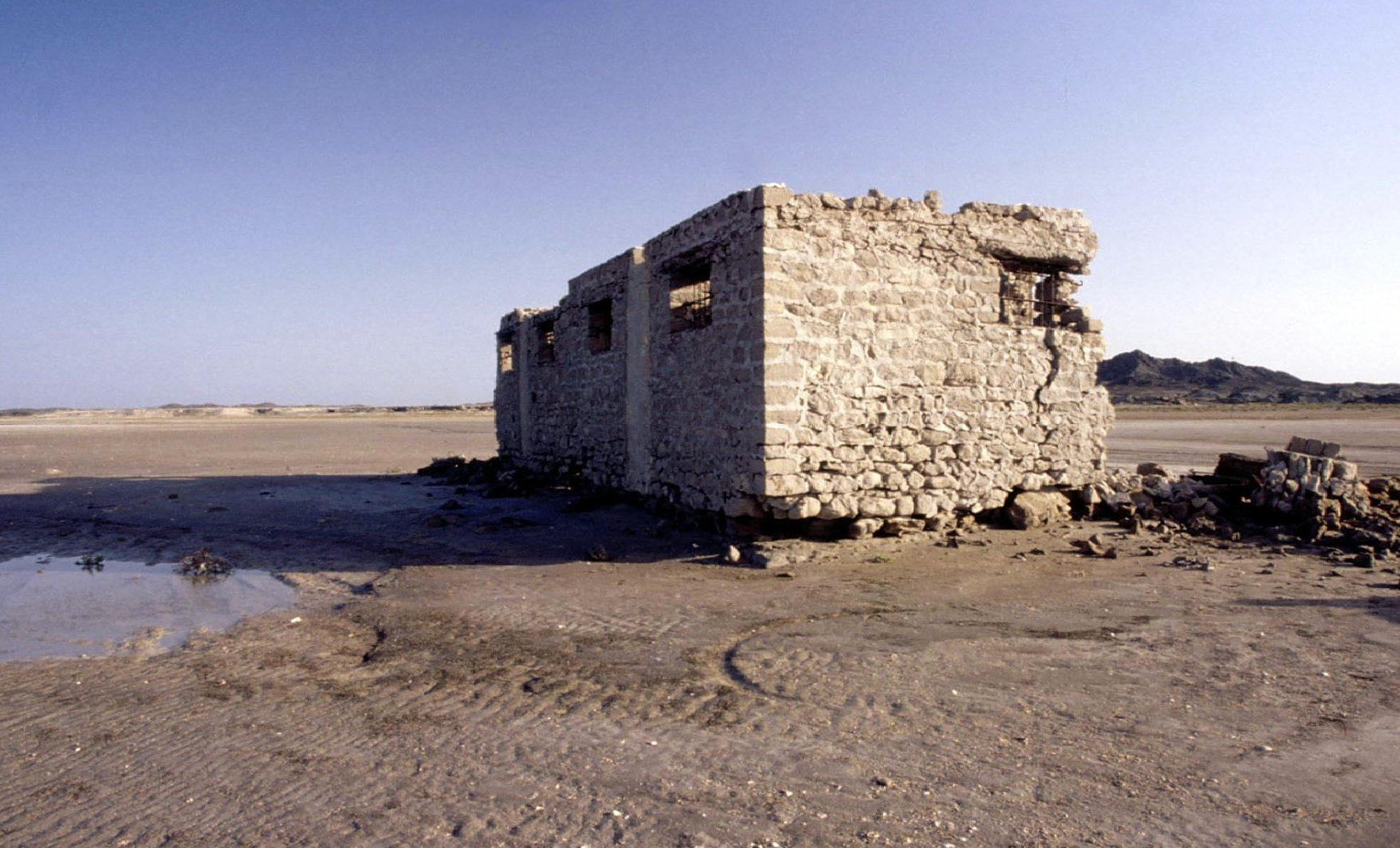
- The remains of the seaplane fuel store in 1984

Site information
- Type: Royal Air Force station/staging post
- Owner: Air Ministry; Ministry of Defence
- Operator: Royal Air Force

Location
- Location within Oman
- Coordinates: 20.670°N 58.891°E

Site history
- Built: 1943
- In use: 1943–1977
- Fate: Reopened as RAFO Masirah

Airfield information
Runways
Direction	Length and surface
19/01	9,000 feet (2,700 m)

RAF Masirah (or Royal Air Force Masirah), was an airfield located on the northern tip of Masirah Island, Oman. The base was built during 1943 as a staging post for flights between Aden and India, its most important function being that of a refuelling point. The base was also used for anti-submarine patrols during the Second World War, and was the last permanently staffed RAF base in the Gulf region from the Second World War, closing in March 1977.

== History ==
The Royal Air Force first visited Masirah in the early 1930s to establish the validity of having a staging post there. The site was chosen as a remote fuelling station on the route between Aden and Iraq; Iraq being the headquarters of the RAF in the Middle East at that point. A refuelling point was needed as Aden was a considerable distance from Iraq. Masirah was at least 1,200 miles (1,900 km) distant from Aden, so was a good location to refuel before the next leg in either direction. During 1942, the Catalinas of 209 Sqn used the seaplane store to refuel, giving them greater reach across the Gulf region whilst on anti-submarine patrol. The anchorage location for seaplanes was at Umm Rusays, a small village on the western side of the island close to Masirah. Several visiting aircraft marked out temporary runways on the island, but in early 1942, a new runway was built to a length of 1,000 yards (910 m) with crushed gypsum as its surface. This was aligned in a rough north–south orientation with the designation of 19/01.

In July 1942, a party of twelve RAF servicemen from No. 73 Operational Training Unit (Aden), arrived to form a permanent detachment. Initially commanded by a sergeant, they had only one Lee Enfield rifle between them in case of enemy action. Their rations in the early days were meagre, and supplemented by supplies brought across the sea by dhows. They had no vegetables, but did live partially on turtle eggs.

Access to the island was not possible for six months of the year other than by air due to the monsoon season, so efforts were made to supply the site by ship six months per year. Unfortunately, there was no harbour, so ships would moor offshore and unload from there, making them susceptible to enemy action. To speed up the offloading process, and also because the engineering team lacked the right materials to make a road, a section of Decauville track was laid from the shore onloading point to the RAF base. This was eventually replaced by a narrow-gauge railway, or nicknamed the Ras Hilf State railway. Work on the base was undertaken by No. 5153 (M&E) Squadron, who were allocated to Aden. They arrived on Masirah in 1942 to build an aerodrome, for which they initially used discarded petrol and oil tins filled with sand for the building walls. This led to the island being nicknamed the Tin-Can Island or Petrol Tin Island. From 1942 until December 1944, a detachment of Consolidate Catalinas from No. 321 Squadron worked from a shore location near to RAF Masirah. 321 had their headquarters at RAF China Bay.

Initially, it was known as No. 33 Staging Post, but it was given full base status in 1943. No. 244 Squadron was moved from RAF Sharjah to Masirah to continue with anti-submarine patrols (ASW - anti-submarine warfare) and to allow Sharjah to be redeveloped as a staging post. When the detachment at Masirah became an official posting for the squadron, the commanding officer of 244 Sqn became the de facto commanding officer of the base and the first operations room (actually a tent) was installed for the base. A second runway was built in 1943, measuring 1,720 yards (1,570 m) long, it was designated as 25/07 and was roughly east/west in its orientation.

In the Second World War, Masirah was also a location for an Air Sea Rescue (ASR) section. This continued post VJ day as the island became a staging post for PoW repatriation flights. Some RAF personnel transiting through had to spend some time at Masirah, however, the climate was cooler than at Aden and the small base was said to have fostered a "community spirit". The base was the location of several detachments of the 200 series squadrons in the ASR and ASW role, notably 212, 259 and 265 squadrons. From June 1945 until April 1946, a detachment of Warwicks from No. 294 Squadron were outbased at Masirah.

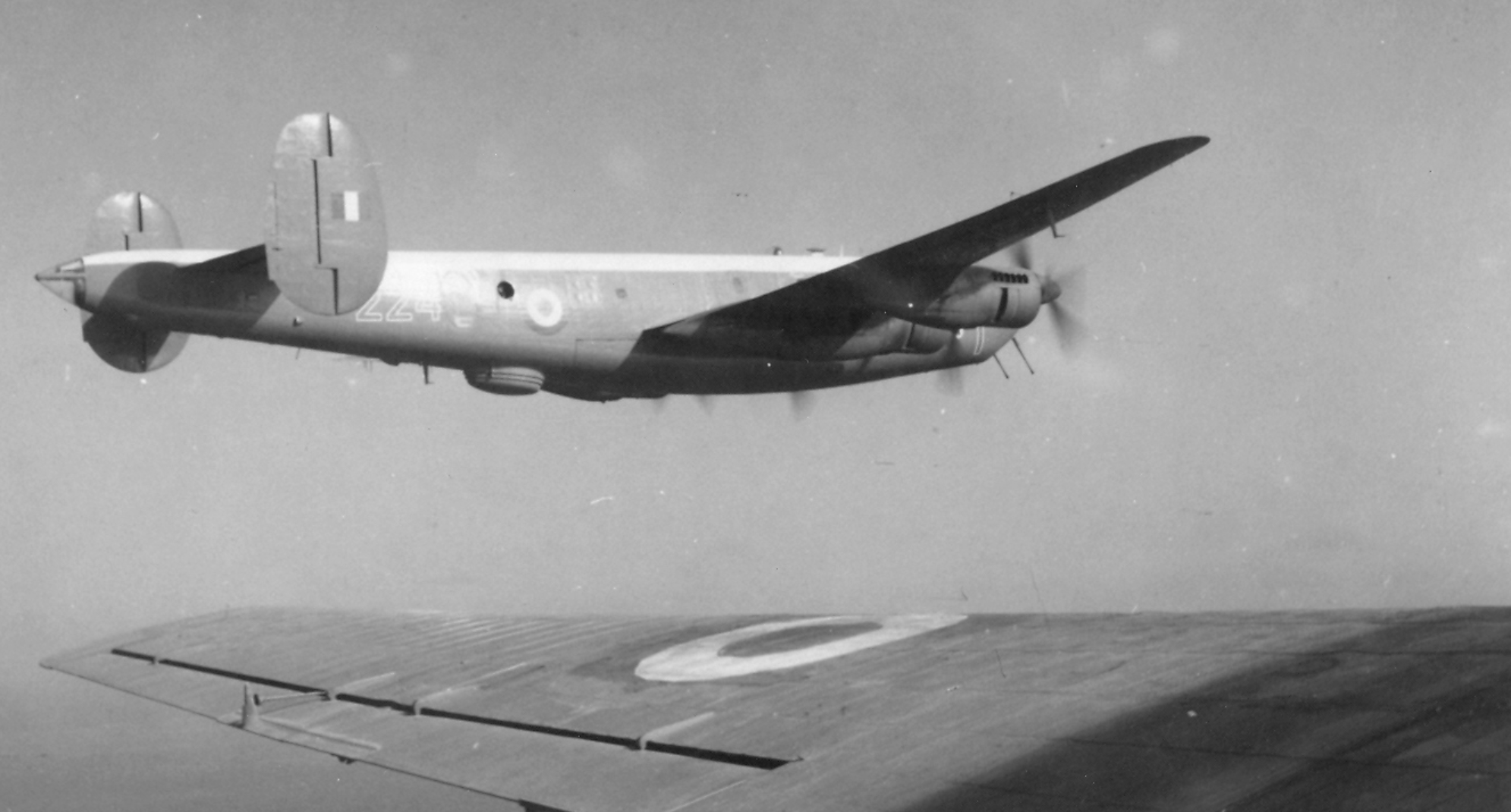
Shackleton flying in formation near Masirah

During the 1950s, the RAF participated in the Jebel Akhdar War against people supportive of Ghalib al-Hinai in the interior of Oman. Shackletons were flown from RAF Masirah to drop 1,000 pounds (450 kg) bombs on the water supply and irrigation systems inland.

In 1958, an agreement was reached with the Sultan of Oman in establishing the Royal Omani Air Force, with Masirah airbase being one of the locations used to help train the new air force. In 1962, the runway at Masirah was extended to 9,000 feet (2,700 m), and the whole base was re-hutted and improved at a cost of £3 million. This enabled it to accept aircraft of the V-bomber force and other types stationed at RAF Akrotiri. B15 and B16 Canberras of numbers 6, 32, 73 and 249 Squadrons visited the base in detachments. The withdrawal from Aden in the late 1960s was detailed by the then Secretary of State for Foreign Affairs (Mr George Brown), who announced the outbasing of the V-bomber force at Masirah for a period of six months from 1 January 1968. The withdrawal also meant that No. 8 Squadron spent several weeks at Masirah before being moved on to its new location at Muharraq.

Masirah's location on an island in the sea off Oman was beneficial to the RAF as a staging post in the 1960s and 1970s. A contingent of Victor refuellers and Lightning aircraft arrived at Masirah in early June 1967. This led to a belief that the Royal Air Force had helped Israel to bomb Egypt during the Six-Day War. However, the exercise was planned well in advance and the aircraft were all on their way to Singapore. During the Indo-Pakistani War of 1971, Masirah was again used as a staging post when RAF Hercules aircraft evacuated 280 people from the shelling of Karachi in early December 1971. The evacuees were mostly British, and were transferred to VC-10 aircraft at Masirah for onward flights to Cyprus and the United Kingdom. Also in 1971, a detachment of Hunters of 8 Sqn were detached to Masirah from RAF Muharraq.

Closure was announced for the base in July 1976, and the RAF formally vacated the site in March 1977. It was the last of the Second World War era permanent RAF stations in the Gulf region. (Note: Subsequently, during Operation Granby, Operation Telic and Operation Herrick, bases were re-established in the region.) Even after closure was announced, the site was still used by the RAF. In November 1986, six Tornados of No. 229 Operational Conversion Unit, flew 4,200 miles (6,800 km) non stop from RAF Coningsby to Masirah to partake in Exercise Saif Sareea, being refuelled seven times by Tristar tanker aircraft on the ten-hour flight.

== Based units ==
Unit	Dates	Notes	Ref
No. 46 Squadron	September 1971 – March 1977	Two Andovers as a detached flight from 46 Sqn (ex 84 Sqn), were used to fly regular flights to Muscat, RAF Salalah and Dubai. They were known affectionately as "Yimkim Airways".	
No. 244 Squadron	March 1944 – May 1945	244 Sqn flew Wellingtons from Masirah on patrols over the Middle East.	

== Badge and motto ==
The station badge was awarded in 1962, and depicted a loggerhead turtle coloured blue (azure in heraldic terms). The Loggerhead turtles were well known on the island, being at one point, a source of food for those stationed there in the early days of the base. However, as the Loggerhead was an omnivore, the meat was described as being "inedible". The motto was in Arabic: "Al-i’ timad’ala al-nafs" which translates as "The reliance is on one’s own self". The official award of the badge did not take place until January 1963, when the Secretary of State for Air, Hugh Fraser, arrived at Masirah to present the badge.
