= HMS Cosby =

Frigate of the Royal Navy

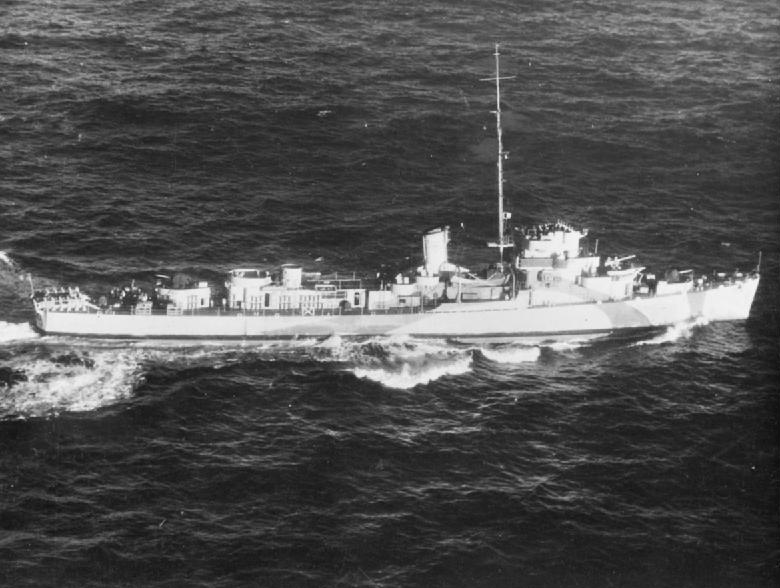
- HMS Cosby, c. 1944

History

United Kingdom
- Builder: Bethlehem Hingham Shipyard
- Laid down: 11 August 1943
- Launched: 20 October 1943
- Commissioned: 20 December 1943
- Decommissioned: Returned to US Navy on 4 March 1946
- Fate: Sold for scrap on 5 November 1946

General characteristics
- Displacement: 1,800 long tons (1,829 t) fully loaded
- Length: 306 ft (93 m) overall
- Beam: 36.5 ft (11.1 m)
- Draught: 9.5 ft (2.9 m) standard; 11.25 ft (3.4 m) full load
- Propulsion: 2 boilers, General Electric Turbo-electric drive 2 solid manganese-bronze 3600 lb 3-bladed propellers, 8.5 ft (2.6 m). diameter, 7 ft 7 in (2.31 m) pitch 12,000 hp (8.9 MW) 2 rudders
- Speed: 24 knots (44 km/h)
- Endurance: 5,500 nautical miles (10,200 km) at 15 knots (28 km/h)
- Complement: Typically between 170 & 186

HMS Cosby was a Buckley-class Captain-class frigate during World War II, it was named after Captain Phillips Cosby (1727–1808) of HMS Robust during the American Revolutionary War.

Originally destined for the US Navy, HMS Cosby was provisionally given the name USS Reeves (later this name was reassigned to DE-156), however the delivery was diverted to the Royal Navy before the launch.

== General information ==
HMS Cosby served with the Nore Command and the Devonport Command earning battle honours for service in the English Channel, North Foreland and North Sea.

- Pennant (UK): K 559
- Pennant (US): DE 94
- Built by: Bethlehem-Hingham Shipyard Inc. (Hingham, Massachusetts, U.S.A.)
