= HMS Byard =

Frigate of the Royal Navy

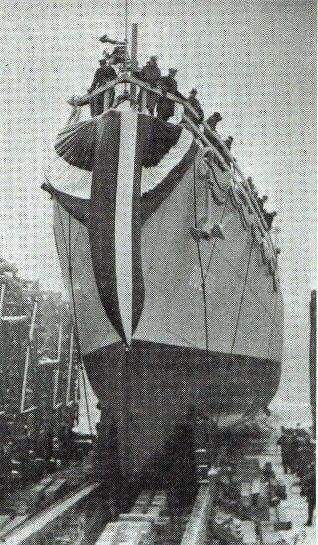
- HMS Byard sliding down the slipway on 6 March 1943 at Bethlehem-Hingham shipyard

History

United Kingdom
- Laid down: 15 October 1942
- Launched: 6 March 1943
- Commissioned: 18 June 1943
- Decommissioned: Returned to US Navy on 12 December 1945
- Fate: Sold for scrap in 1946

General characteristics
- Class & type: Captain-class frigate
- Displacement: 1,800 long tons (1,829 t) fully loaded
- Length: 306 ft (93 m) overall
- Beam: 36.5 ft (11.1 m)
- Draught: 11 ft (3.4 m) fully loaded
- Speed: 24 knots (44 km/h)
- Endurance: 5,500 nautical miles (10,200 km) at 15 knots (28 km/h)
- Complement: Typically between 170 & 180

HMS Byard was a Captain-class frigate of the Royal Navy during World War II. She was named for Sir Thomas Byard, who commanded HMS Bedford at the Battle of Camperdown in 1797 during the French Revolutionary Wars.

Originally destined for the US Navy as a turbo-electric (TE) type Buckley-class destroyer escort, HMS Byard was provisionally given the name USS Donaldson (this name was reassigned to DE 44). However the ship was diverted to the Royal Navy before her launch.

== Actions ==
HMS Byard served exclusively with the 4th Escort Group earning battle honours for service in the North Atlantic.

In 1943, HMS Byard's ship's company paraded in Boston, MA, in the American Day parade.

On 17 October 1943, HMS Byard was escorting Atlantic convoy ONS 20 which was attacked by a wolf pack of 16 U-boats east of Cape Farewell, Greenland. During the ensuing battle HMS Byard sank the submarine U-841 at position 59°57′N 31°06′W, by the use of depth charges resulting in 27 dead and 27 survivors from U-841's crew. This action made HMS Byard the first Captain-class frigate to destroy a Kriegsmarine submarine.

== General information ==
- Pennant (UK): K 315
- Pennant (US): DE 55
