= Captain-class frigate =

Designation given to 78 frigates of the Royal Navy

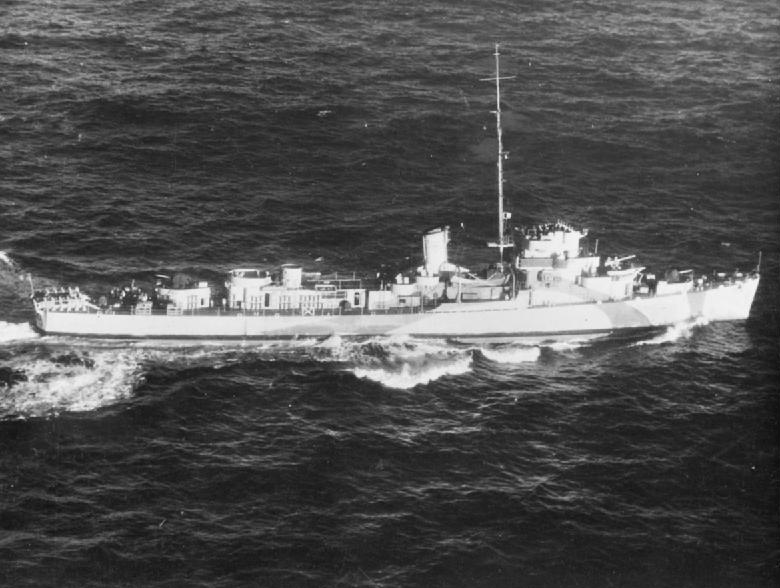
- HMS Cosby, an example of the Buckley subclass.

Class overview
- Builders: Boston Navy Yard, MA (31); Philadelphia Navy Yard, PA (1); Bethlehem-Hingham, MA (46)
- Operators: Royal Navy
- Subclasses: GMT (Evarts) Type; TE (Buckley) Type
- Built: 1941–1943
- In service: 1943–1956
- Completed: 78
- Lost: 7 sunk; 8 Constructive total loss

General characteristics
- Type: Frigate
- Displacement: 1,140 long tons (1,158 t) (Evarts); 1,400 long tons (1,422 t) (Buckley)
- Length: 289 ft 6 in (88.24 m) (Evarts); 306 ft (93 m) (Buckley)
- Beam: 35 ft (11 m) (Evarts); 36 ft 9 in (11.20 m) (Buckley)
- Draft: 9 ft (2.7 m) (Evarts); 11 ft (3.4 m) (Buckley)
- Decks: 7
- Installed power: 7,040 bhp (5,250 kW) (Evarts); 13,500 shp (10,070 kW) (Buckley)
- Propulsion: See text
- Speed: 20 knots (37 km/h; 23 mph) (Evarts); 24 knots (44 km/h; 28 mph) (Buckley)
- Range: 5,000 nautical miles (9,300 km; 5,800 mi) at 15 knots (28 km/h; 17 mph) (Evarts); 5,500 nautical miles (10,200 km; 6,300 mi) at 15 knots (28 km/h; 17 mph) (Buckley)
- Boats & landing craft carried: Royal Navy 27-foot (8.2 m) whaler; US Navy standard ship's boat
- Complement: 156 (Evarts); 186 (Buckley)
- Sensors & processing systems: SA & SL type radars; Type 128D or Type 144 series Asdic; MF Direction Finding antenna; HF Direction Finding Type FH 4 antenna
- Armament: 3 × 3 in (76 mm) /50 Mk.22 guns; 1 × twin Bofors 40 mm mount Mk.I; 7–16 × 20 mm Oerlikon guns; Mark 10 Hedgehog A/S projector; 2 x rails, 4 x throwers, up to 200 depth charges; QF 2-pounder naval gun

The Captain class was the designation given to 78 frigates of the Royal Navy, constructed in the United States, launched in 1942–1943 and delivered to the United Kingdom under the provisions of the Lend-Lease agreement. They were drawn from two classes of the American destroyer escort (originally "British Destroyer Escort") classification: 32 of the GMT (Evarts) Type and 46 of the TE (Buckley) Type. Upon reaching the UK the ships were substantially modified by the Royal Navy, making them distinct from the US Navy destroyer escort ships.

Captain-class frigates acted in the roles of convoy escorts, anti-submarine warfare vessels, coastal forces control frigates and headquarters ships for the Normandy landings. During the course of World War II this class participated in the sinking of at least 34 German submarines and a number of other hostile craft; 15 of the 78 Captain-class frigates were either sunk or written off as a constructive total loss.

In the post-war period, all of the surviving Captain-class frigates except one (HMS Hotham which was used as a power station and for powerplant experiments) were returned to the US Navy before the end of 1947 in order to reduce the amount payable under the provisions of the Lend-Lease agreement; the last Captain-class frigate was returned to United States custody in March 1956.

== Naming ==
It was the intention of the Admiralty that these ships would be named after captains who served with Vice-Admiral Horatio Nelson at the Battle of Trafalgar, but as building continued it became necessary to delve back further into history for the names of well-regarded admirals and captains.

Of the 78 frigates, 66 bore names that had not been allocated to earlier Royal Navy ships. Lawford, Louis, Manners, Moorsom, Mounsey, Narborough, Pasley and Seymour had been used for destroyers during World War I. HMS Rupert was the fifth of that name since 1666. Torrington was the fourth of that name since 1654. Holmes had been used once before in 1671 and Fitzroy had previously been used for a survey vessel in 1919.

== Early history ==
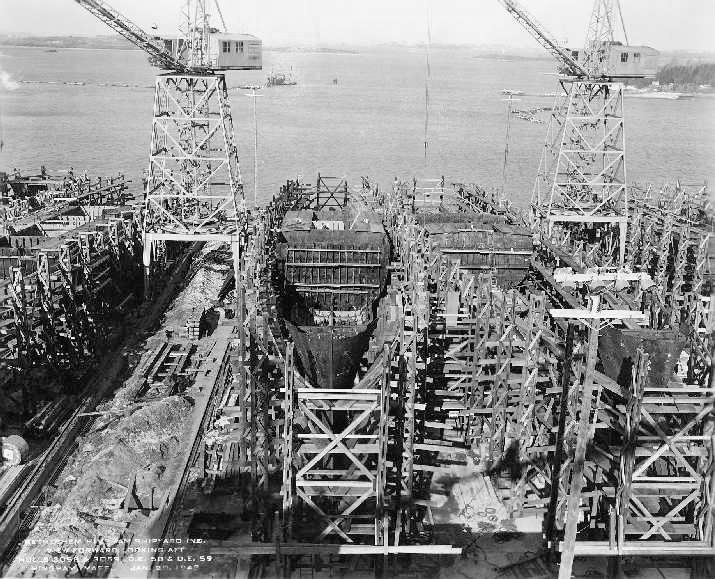
Two of the Buckley subclass under construction.

In June 1941 the British government, seeking to take advantage of the US Lend-Lease program, asked the United States to design, build and supply an escort vessel that was suitable for anti-submarine warfare in deep open ocean situations. The requested particulars were a length of 300 feet (90 m), a speed of 20 knots (37 km/h), a dual purpose main armament and an open bridge. The United States Navy had been looking into the feasibility of such a vessel since 1939, and Captain E. L. Cochrane of the US Navy's Bureau of Ships – who, during his visit to the United Kingdom in 1940, had looked at Royal Navy corvettes and Hunt-class destroyers – had come up with a design for such a vessel. This design anticipated a need for large numbers of this type of vessel, and had sought to remove the major production bottleneck for such vessels: the double helical reduction gearing required for the steam turbine machinery of destroyers. The production of reduction gears could not be easily increased, as the precision machinery required for their construction alone took over a year to produce. Therefore, a readily-available and proven layout of diesel-electric machinery, also used on submarines, was adopted. When the United Kingdom made its request, Admiral Stark of the US Navy decided to put these plans into motion and recommended that the British order be approved. Gibbs and Cox, the marine architects charged with creating working plans, had to make several alterations to the production methods and to Captain Cochrane's original design, most notably dropping another production bottleneck – the 5-inch/38-caliber gun – and replacing it with the 3-inch/50-caliber gun, which allowed adding a superfiring third gun (at the "B" position, forward); also, the original design specified eight engines for 24 knots (44 km/h; 28 mph) but other priority programs forced the use of only four with a consequent shortening of the hull and reduction of the ship's maximum speed by an estimated 4 knots (7.4 km/h; 4.6 mph). The design had relatively light armour with for example the steel plate used on the Buckleys ranging from 1/2 inch to 7/16 inch with 1/4 inch plate being used for the majority of the hull and deck plating.

The result was a vessel that could be produced quickly (for example Halsted was built in just 24 and half days) at half the cost of a fleet destroyer, ($3.5 million compared to $10.4 million for a 1,620-ton destroyer such as the US Benson class or $6.4 million for British Hunt-class destroyer.)

On 15 August 1941 President Franklin D. Roosevelt authorised the construction of 50 of the new Evarts-class design as BDE 1–50 (British destroyer escort) as part of the 1799 program. The turbo-electric powered Buckley class were not part of the first order and were authorised later by Public Law 440 effective 6 February 1942. The Royal Navy placed orders in November 1941 with four shipyards: the Boston Navy Yard, the Mare Island Navy Yard, the Philadelphia Naval Shipyard and the Puget Sound Navy Yard. When the United States entered the war, they too adopted the BDE design. The BDE designation was retained by the first six destroyer escorts (BDEs 1, 2, 3, 4, 12 and 46) transferred to the United Kingdom. Of the initial 50 ordered, these were the only ones the Royal Navy received; the rest were reclassified as destroyer escorts (DE) on 25 January 1943 and taken over by the United States Navy. By the end of World War II the Royal Navy had received 31 Evarts from Boston Navy Yard, 1 from Philadelphia Navy Yard and 46 Buckleys from Bethlehem-Hingham.

The Royal Navy classified these ships as frigates, as they lacked the torpedo tubes needed for a destroyer classification. For those used to Admiralty-designed ships the Captains were unfamiliar: they had no break forward of the forecastle but instead had a graceful shear to deck-line from the forecastle to midship, and the Evarts had raked cowls on top of the funnels. Those who served on these ships came to view these features as being very handsome. Amongst the differences with British-designed vessels were using bunks instead of hammocks and welds instead of rivets.

== Propulsion ==
The Evarts subclass had diesel-electric machinery, based on an arrangement used for submarines. There were two shafts. Four Winton 278A 16-cylinder engines, with a combined rating of 7,040 bhp (5,250 kW), drove General Electric Company (GE) generators (4,800 kW) that supplied power to two GE electric motors, with an output of 6,000 shp (4,500 kW), for a speed of 20 knots (37 km/h; 23 mph). It had been intended to provide another set of this machinery for an output of 12,000 shp (8,900 kW), to make the design speed of 24 knots (44 km/h; 28 mph), but hull production greatly outstripped that of the machinery; therefore, only one set of machinery was used per ship.

In order to make the designed speed, the Buckley subclass had turbo-electric machinery. Two Foster Wheeler Express "D"-type water-tube boilers supplied steam to GE 13,500 shp (10,070 kW) steam turbines and generators (9,200 kW). Electric motors for 12,000 shp (8,900 kW) drove the two shafts, each fitted with a three-bladed propeller of solid manganese-bronze that was 8 ft 6 in (2.59 m) in diameter. This all-electric drivetrain was considered particularly innovative at the time, although the Auk-class minesweepers (known as Catherine class in RN) had a similar arrangement.

== Royal Navy alterations ==
The first port of call in the United Kingdom for most of the Captain-class vessels was Pollock Dock, Belfast where the ships were modified in order to match Admiralty requirements. In all there were 109 items in the alterations and additions list for the Evarts and 94 for the Buckleys.

One major design difference between the Royal Navy Buckley-class frigates and the US Navy Buckley-class destroyer escorts was that the Royal Navy frigates did not mount torpedo tubes. (The Evarts class was not designed to carry torpedoes.) The resulting reduction in top weight combined with the previous reduction in the gun battery resulted in excessive stability, causing sharp and violent rolling behaviour in the relatively short North Atlantic swells. Several solutions were discussed including reshipping the torpedo tubes and replacing the American 3"/50 caliber guns with heavier British 4.5 inch but all proved impractical due to production bottlenecks and wartime congestion in British shipyards. The problem was ultimately addressed by increasing the number of depth charges stowed on the upper deck and fitting larger bilge keels, which tamed the roll to manageable levels.

Further alterations were:

=== Sea-keeping equipment ===
A crow's nest was affixed to the mainmast. A standard Royal Navy 27-foot (8 m) whaler was fitted on the port side of the funnel in addition to the US-issue ship's boat on the starboard side; additional Carley lifesaving rafts were also fitted: big ones on sloping launch skids aft of the funnel and small ones aft of the searchlights. Wind deflectors were fitted on the leading edge of the bridge area and a canvas-covered shelter was installed on the quarterdeck to provide better weather protection for depth charge crews. Oiling fairleads were fitted to the edge of the hull by the anchor winch. The bilge keels were lengthened and made deeper (a process that took a minimum of three weeks).

=== Gunnery ===
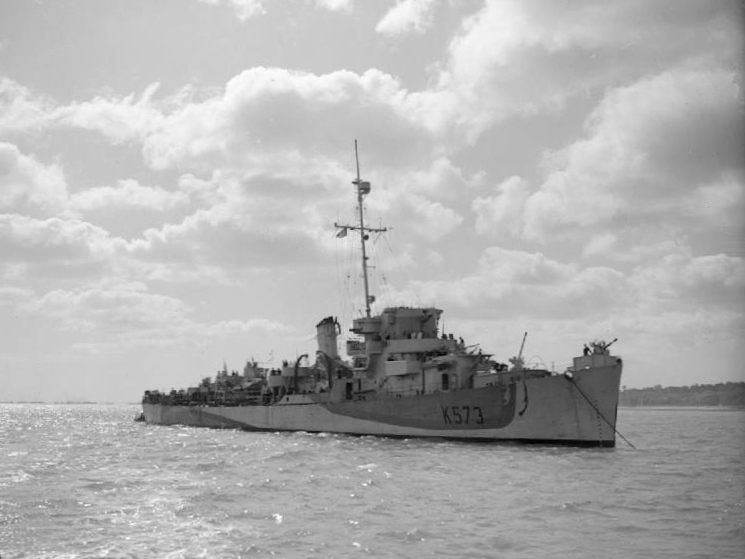
HMS Stayner acting as a Coastal Forces control frigate; note the 2-pounder (40 mm) "pom-pom" bowchaser

More 40 mm Bofors and Oerlikon 20 mm guns were mounted in place of the removed torpedo tubes, and the MK IV elevating column Oerlikon mountings were replaced with the simpler MK VIA mountings; those ships that were to serve as Coastal Forces control frigates hunting E-boats had extra guns fitted. On some ships, either gun shields were fitted to the main armament, or a spray and blast shield was fitted to the B gun. Two-inch rocket flare projectors were fitted to the B gun: six if the spray and blast shield was fitted, three if not. A 40 mm QF 2-pounder Mk VIII "pom-pom" was fitted as bowchaser to ships that were to serve as Coastal Forces control frigates.

The bridge layout was significantly altered; the biggest alteration was the addition of a two-tier director control tower that improved visibility and gave better protection to the equipment. Vertically fired "snowflake" parachute flare projectors were fitted to the bridge wings.

=== Anti-submarine ===
More depth charges were fitted on the upper deck of each side of the ship, allowing for about 200 in total; Royal Navy smoke floats were fitted above the depth charges in addition to the US Navy chemical smoke cylinders fitted to the stern of the Captains. A medium frequency direction finding antenna (MF/DF) was fitted in front of the bridge and a high-frequency direction finding (HF/DF, "Huffduff") Type FH 4 antenna was fitted on top of the mainmast; furthermore, a radio-receiving set tuned to the frequencies used for ship-to-ship communication by German U-boats and E-boats was fitted and a German-speaking rating carried. The Captains were eventually given Type 144 series Asdic (sonar) sets, an upgrade from the original Type 128D, and a Foxer was fitted to the aft of the Captains (and most other Atlantic escort vessels) during 1944 to counter the new G7es acoustic torpedoes.

=== Navigation and communications ===
The steel parts around the binnacle (the enclosure containing the compass) were replaced by non-ferrous materials. In addition to the standard US Navy long-range position-fixing set (LORAN), a Royal Navy GEE short-range position-fixing set was fitted. A radar interrogation system was installed that was able to challenge ships at sea (only ships likewise fitted with the system would be able to reply), along with four coloured fighting lights (signalling lamps installed on the yardarm to aid recognition by friendly forces during night fighting).

=== Camouflage and insignia ===
Following standard Royal Navy protocols, all of the Captains had large pennant numbers painted on the sides and stern of the hull, usually in blue, red or black. The escort groups to which most Captains were assigned had their own individual insignia; these distinctive and colourful designs were painted on the side of the ship's funnel, and if the ship was home to the escort group's senior officer it would also have a coloured band painted around the top of the funnel (usually in blue or red). The ship's waterline was always in black.

A total of five different ship camouflage schemes were employed on the Captains. The ships came from the shipyards in white with light blue polygons, the US Navy's camouflage pattern for northern latitudes. For those ships assigned to the North Atlantic, a scheme consisting of light and dark blues and greens with some soft white was adopted as it was believed that this would blend with the sea colour in bad weather. Ships assigned to the English Channel in 1944 (Coastal Forces control frigates and those assigned to Operation Neptune as headquarters ships) received a design in black, blue, light grey and white. For ships assigned to the 16th Flotilla (Harwich) and 21st Flotilla (Sheerness) operating in the North Sea and English Channel, a scheme consisting of horizontal upper deck divisions of light and dark grey (as used by the US Navy) was used. Early in 1945, a scheme was adopted that was to be common to all Royal Navy ships, consisting of white with a sky-blue stripe along the hull.

=== Modifications to Normandy landing HQ ships ===
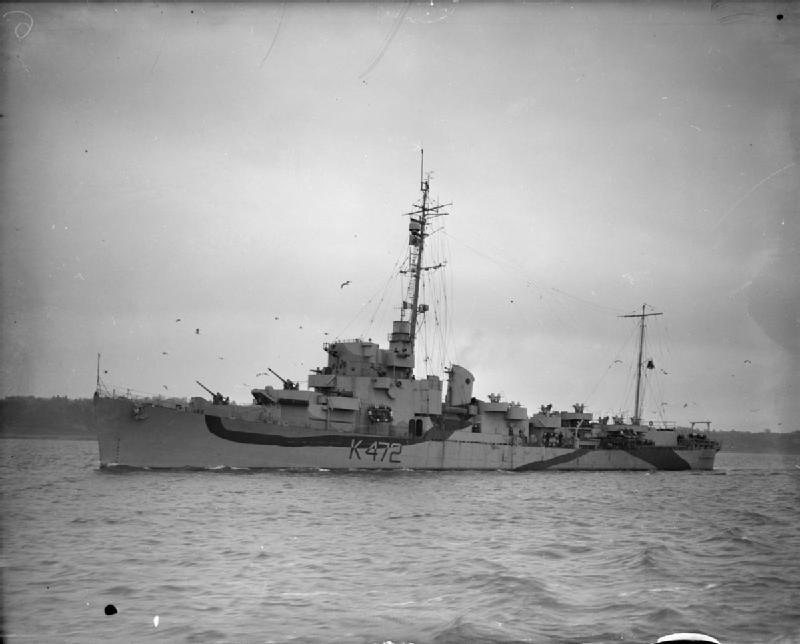
HMS Dacres, converted to act as a headquarters ship for the Normandy landings; note the additional smaller mainmast to support the extra aerials.

HMS Dacres, HMS Kingsmill and HMS Lawford were converted to headquarters ships for use during Operation Neptune (the Normandy landings). These ships had their aft three-inch (76 mm) gun and all the depth charge gear removed, and the superstructure extended, to provide accommodations for extra Staff Officers; two deckhouses were built for the additional radios needed and a smaller extra mainmast was added to support the many additional aerials. Four more Oerlikons were fitted bringing the total to 16, and a number of radar sets fitted (Type 271 centimetric target identification and Type 291 air warning, and the associated Types 242 and 253 IFF sets). The complement was reduced to 141, but with a headquarters staff of 64.

== Ships' companies ==
The Captains had a typical crew of either 156 (Evarts) or 186 (Buckley) officers and ratings. The bulk of the ratings enlisted after the outbreak of World War II, thus having little military or seafaring experience, and had to be trained in whichever branch of the Navy they chose to serve; after about six weeks drilling, marching and generally getting physically fit they went into specific job training. Many of the senior non-commissioned officers were pre-war Royal Navy ratings who had been promoted.

Engineering personnel were faced with the added complication of power plants not normally found in the Royal Navy. Initially, they were trained alongside US Navy personnel at purpose-built facilities in the General Electric Company factories at Cleveland and Syracuse, and were awarded certificates at the end of their training; later, training was provided in the United Kingdom.

Ship's companies were shipped over to the US by them taking passage from the Clyde or Liverpool to New York on ocean liners such as Queen Mary. On arriving in New York, the crews were initially assigned to HMS Saker until they were reassigned to a Captain-class frigate. Later, some of the Captains were ferried across the Atlantic by crews of the Royal Canadian Navy coming to the United Kingdom to collect River-class frigates ordered by the Canadians.

== Operations ==
These ships were primarily deployed to Escort Groups that were then used to provide anti-submarine cover to the convoys that they escorted. The four or more ships in an escort group, by operating together under a single commander, were able to use group tactics so that with the issue of a single short command the various ships of the group, often out of sight of each other, could be relied upon to act in a co-ordinated fashion.

A small number of Captains were converted to act as headquarters ships during Operation Neptune (the Normandy landings) and as coastal forces control frigates. Captains who operated with Coastal Forces (motor torpedo boats, motor gun boats and US Navy PT boats) sank at least two two-man submarines, and were involved in the destruction of at least 26 E-boats, one KFK patrol vessel (coastal escort vessels constructed so as to resemble a fishing-vessel), two minesweepers, and the shooting down of a Junkers Ju 88 aeroplane.

Submarine sinkings in which Captain-class frigates participated
Submarine	Date	Ships	Fate of submarine crew	Position sunk
U-841	17 October 1943	Byard	27 lost and 27 survivors	59°57′N 31°06′W
U-538	21 November 1943	Foley	55, all hands Lost	southwest of Ireland 45°40′N 19°35′W
U-600	25 November 1943	Bazely, Blackwood	54, all hands lost	40°31′N 22°07′W
U-757	8 January 1944	Bayntun	49, all hands lost	50°33′N 18°03′W
U-91	26 February 1944	Affleck, Gore, Gould	36 lost and 16 survivors	49°45′N 26°20′W
U-358	1 March 1944	Affleck, Gore, Gould, Garlies	50 lost and 1 survivor	45°46′N 23°16′W
U-392	16 March 1944	Affleck	52, all hands lost	35°55′N 05°41′W
U-765	6 May 1944	Bickerton, Bligh, Aylmer with Swordfish aircraft from HMS Vindex	37 lost and 11 survivors	North Atlantic 52°30′N 28°28′W
U-269	25 June 1944	Bickerton	13 lost and 39 survivors	50°01′N 02°59′W
U-988	29 June 1944	Duckworth, Cooke, Domett, Essington together with Liberator aircraft	50, all hands lost	English Channel 49°37′N 03°41′W
U-672	18 July 1944	Balfour	52 survivors	English Channel, north of Guernsey 50°03′N 02°30′W
U-212	21 July 1944	Curzon, Ekins	49 all hands lost	English Channel south of Brighton 50°27′N 00°13′W
U-214	26 July 1944	Cooke	48, all hands lost	English Channel 49°58′N 03°30′W
U-671	5 August 1944	Stayner	47 lost and 5 survivors	English Channel 50°23′N 00°06′E
U-618	14 August 1944	Duckworth, Essington	61, all hands lost	47°22′N 04°39′W
U-445	24 August 1944	Louis	52, all hands lost	47°21′N 05°50′W
U-1051	26 January 1945	Aylmer, Bentinck, Calder, Manners	47, all hands lost	53°39′N 05°23′W
U-1172	27 January 1945	Tyler, Keats, Bligh	52, all hands lost	52°24′N 05°42′W
U-1279	3 February 1945	Bayntun, Braithwaite	48, all hands lost	61°21′N 02°00′E
U-989	14 February 1945	Bayntun, Braithwaite	47, all hands lost	61°36′N 01°35′W
U-1278	17 February 1945	Bayntun	48, all hands lost	61°32′N 01°36′E
U-1208	27 February 1945	Duckworth, Rowley	49, all hands lost	English Channel 49°56′N 06°06′W
U-399	26 March 1945	Duckworth	46 lost and 1 survivor	English Channel 49°56′N 05°22′W
U-722	27 March 1945	Fitzroy, Redmill, Byron	44, all hands lost	57°09′N 06°55′W
U-905	27 March 1945	Conn	45, all hands lost	58°34′N 05°46′W
U-1169	29 March 1945	Duckworth, Rowley	49, all hands lost	49°58′N 05°25′W
U-965	30 March 1945	Conn, Rupert, Deane	51, all hands lost	58°19′N 05°31′W
U-1001	8 April 1945	Fitzroy, Byron	45, all hands lost	North Atlantic south-west of Land's End 49°19′N 10°23′W
U-774	8 April 1945	Bentinck, Calder	44, all hands lost	49°58′N 11°51′W
U-1063	15 April 1945	Cranstoun, Burges Sank by depth charges from HMS Loch Killin	29 lost and 17 survivors	50°08′N 03°53′W
U-285	15 April 1945	Grindall, Keats	44, all hands lost	50°13′N 12°48′W
U-636	21 April 1945	Bentinck, Bazely, Drury	42, all hands lost	55°50′N 10°31′W
U-286	29 April 1945	Cotton	51, all hands lost	69°29′N 33°37′E

Captain-class frigates sunk or seriously damaged
Ship	Date	Incident
Gould	1 March 1944	Torpedoed and sunk by U-358 south-west of Ireland at 45°46′N 23°16′W. Loss of 123 hands.
Lawford	8 June 1944	Hit by a Glide bomb launched from a Luftwaffe aeroplane in her hull, port side midships, that blew out the bottom of the ship which quickly sank, off J1 Sector of Gold Beach on D-Day+2. Loss of 26 hands.
Halstead	11 June 1944	Torpedoed by an E-boat in mid channel off Normandy that blew off her bow section, she was written off as a constructive total loss. Loss of 27 hands.
Blackwood	15 June 1944	Torpedoed by U-764, the forward part of ship was blown off; the hulk sank at 04:10 15 June 1944. Loss of 60 hands.
Goodson	26 June 1944	Torpedoed by U-984 approximately 38 nautical miles (70 km) south of Portland Bill in position 50°00′N 02°48′W; badly damaged towed back to port and assessed as a constructive total loss. No fatalities.
Bickerton	22 August 1944	Torpedoed by U-354 during Operation Goodwood in the Barents Sea; at 72°42′N 19°11′E seriously damaged and ship abandoned, sunk by own forces. Loss of 39 hands.
Whitaker	1 November 1944	Torpedoed by U-483 off Malin Head, near Loch Swilly, Ireland; she was seriously damaged, and towed back to Belfast. Declared a constructive total loss. Loss of 92 hands.
Mounsey	2 November 1944	Torpedoed by U-295 outside the Kola Inlet but managed to limp back to Polyarnoe, where she was patched up by the Soviets and managed to get back to Belfast before Christmas for permanent repairs. Loss of 10 hands.
Bullen	6 December 1944	Torpedoed midships and sunk off Cape Wrath by U-775 at 58°42′N 04°12′W. Loss of 55 hands.
Dakins	25 December 1944	Hit a ground mine off the Belgium coast; she was towed into Antwerp where she was declared a constructive total loss. No fatalities.
Capel	26 December 1944	Torpedoed by one of two torpedoes fired by U-486, she sank having had her bow blown off north-north-east of Cherbourg, at 49°50′N 01°41′W. Loss of 76 hands.
Affleck	26 December 1944	Torpedoed off Cherbourg by one of two torpedoes fired by U-486, which seriously damaged her stern. She was towed back to port and assessed as a constructive total loss. Loss of 9 hands.
Manners	26 January 1945	Torpedoed by U-1051 off the Isle of Man. She was towed back to Barrow-in-Furness and declared a constructive total loss. Loss of 43 hands.
Ekins	15 April 1945	Hit two ground mines in the Scheldt Estuary, towed back to port and put into dry dock, when water was pumped out she broke her back and was written off as a constructive total loss. No fatalities
Redmill	27 April 1945	Torpedoed by U-1105 25 nautical miles (46 km) west of Sligo Bay, Ireland at 54°23′N 10°36′W towed into Belfast with serious damage. Written off as a Constructive Total Loss. Loss of 24 hands.
Goodall	29 April 1945	Torpedoed by U-286 outside the Kola Inlet 69°29′N 33°38′E. Goodall was the last ship of the Royal Navy sunk in the European theatre of World War II. Loss of 98 hands.

Collectively, the Captain class gained battle honours for service in Arctic (Russian) Convoys, Atlantic, Biscay, English Channel, Normandy (D-Day on 6 June 1944 and subsequent related operations), North Foreland and Walcheren. During the course of World War II they destroyed more German submarines than any other Royal Navy ship class.

== Post-war ==
At the end of World War II, most of the surviving Captains were returned to the US Navy as quickly as possible to reduce the amount payable under the provisions of the Lend-Lease agreement. The last of the Captains returned was Hotham, which in the post-war period served as a floating power station in Singapore until early 1948, when she sailed for Portsmouth, becoming the base for a Royal Navy Engineering research team experimenting with gas turbine engines. Hotham was returned on 25 April 1952 and simultaneously transferred back to the United Kingdom under the Mutual Defence Assistance Program. The partially stripped vessel was returned to United States custody on 13 March 1956.

== In film ==
Much of the Robert Mitchum film The Enemy Below (1957) was filmed in USS Whitehurst, a Buckley-class destroyer escort, of the same type as the Captain class. The rest of the film is set in the U-boat that it is hunting. USS Alfred A. Cunningham (DD-752) has a cameo in the final burial scene.

== Memorial ==
On 17 April 2005 a memorial to the Captain class, those who served and those killed in action while serving in them was dedicated at the National Memorial Arboretum near Alrewas, Staffordshire.

Today we come in thanksgiving for all who served on Captain-Class Frigates in the Royal Navy in the Second World War.

In particular we give thanks to those who made the supreme sacrifice on behalf of us all.

We remember all those who were shore-based, especially the Wrens who gave valuable support to those who served at sea, and who are represented here today.

— Introduction to the Order of Service from the memorial dedication, 17 April 2005

== See also ==
- Coastal Forces of the Royal Navy
- Colony-class frigate
- The Enemy Below (a 1957 war film partially filmed on a Buckley-class destroyer escort)
- List of destroyer escorts of the United States Navy
- List of frigate classes of the Royal Navy
- USS Slater (DE-766) (the Destroyer Escort Historical Museum).
- List of ship classes of World War II
