= German submarine U-295 =

German World War II submarine

History

Nazi Germany
- Name: U-295
- Ordered: 14 October 1941
- Builder: Bremer Vulkan Werft, Bremen-Vegesack
- Yard number: 60
- Laid down: 31 December 1942
- Launched: 13 September 1943
- Commissioned: 20 October 1943
- Fate: Surrendered on 9 May 1945; sunk as part of Operation Deadlight on 17 December 1945

General characteristics
- Class & type: Type VIIC/41 submarine
- Displacement: 759 tonnes (747 long tons) surfaced; 860 t (846 long tons) submerged
- Length: 67.10 m (220 ft 2 in) o/a; 50.50 m (165 ft 8 in) pressure hull
- Beam: 6.20 m (20 ft 4 in) o/a; 4.70 m (15 ft 5 in) pressure hull
- Height: 9.60 m (31 ft 6 in)
- Draught: 4.74 m (15 ft 7 in)
- Installed power: 2,800–3,200 PS (2,100–2,400 kW; 2,800–3,200 bhp) (diesels); 750 PS (550 kW; 740 shp) (electric)
- Propulsion: 2 shafts; 2 × diesel engines; 2 × electric motors
- Speed: 17.7 knots (32.8 km/h; 20.4 mph) surfaced; 7.6 knots (14.1 km/h; 8.7 mph) submerged
- Range: 8,500 nmi (15,700 km; 9,800 mi) at 10 knots (19 km/h; 12 mph) surfaced; 80 nmi (150 km; 92 mi) at 4 knots (7.4 km/h; 4.6 mph) submerged
- Test depth: 250 m (820 ft); Crush depth: 275–325 m (902–1,066 ft)
- Complement: 4 officers, 40–56 enlisted
- Armament: 5 × 53.3 cm (21 in) torpedo tubes (four bow, one stern); 14 × torpedoes; 1 × 8.8 cm (3.46 in) deck gun (220 rounds); 1 × 3.7 cm (1.5 in) Flak M42 AA gun; 2 × 2 cm (0.79 in) C/30 AA guns

Service record
- Part of: 8th U-boat Flotilla; 20 October 1943 – 31 July 1944; 11th U-boat Flotilla; 1 August – 30 September 1944; 13th U-boat Flotilla; 1 October 1944 – 31 March 1945; 14th U-boat Flotilla; 1 April – 8 May 1945
- Identification codes: M 52 195
- Commanders: Kptlt. Günther Wieboldt; 20 October 1943 – 19 May 1945
- Operations: 6 patrols: 1st patrol: a. 13 – 17 July 1944; b. 28 – 29 July 1944; c. 12 – 14 September 1944; d. 1 – 5 October 1944; 2nd patrol: 6 October – 9 November 1944; 3rd patrol: 18 November – 18 December 1944; 4th patrol: 7 – 10 January 1945; 5th patrol: 16 – 28 January 1945; 6th patrol: a. 15 April – 7 May 1945; b. 12 May 1945; c. 15 – 19 May 1945
- Victories: 1 warship damaged (1,150 tons)

German submarine U-295 was a Type VIIC/41 U-boat of Nazi Germany's Kriegsmarine during World War II.

She was laid down on 31 December 1942 by the Bremer Vulkan Werft (yard) at Bremen-Vegesack as yard number 60, launched on 13 September 1943 and commissioned on 20 October with Kapitänleutnant Günther Wieboldt in command.

In six patrols, she damaged one warship.

She surrendered at Loch Eriboll in Scotland on 9 May 1945 and was sunk as part of Operation Deadlight on 17 December 1945.

== Design ==
German Type VIIC/41 submarines were preceded by the shorter Type VIIB submarines. U-295 had a displacement of 759 tonnes (747 long tons) when at the surface and 860 tonnes (850 long tons) while submerged. She had a total length of 67.10 m (220 ft 2 in), a pressure hull length of 50.50 m (165 ft 8 in), a beam of 6.20 m (20 ft 4 in), a height of 9.60 m (31 ft 6 in), and a draught of 4.74 m (15 ft 7 in). The submarine was powered by two Germaniawerft F46 four-stroke, six-cylinder supercharged diesel engines producing a total of 2,800 to 3,200 metric horsepower (2,060 to 2,350 kW; 2,760 to 3,160 shp) for use while surfaced, two AEG GU 460/8–27 double-acting electric motors producing a total of 750 metric horsepower (550 kW; 740 shp) for use while submerged. She had two shafts and two 1.23 m (4 ft) propellers. The boat was capable of operating at depths of up to 230 metres (750 ft).

The submarine had a maximum surface speed of 17.7 knots (32.8 km/h; 20.4 mph) and a maximum submerged speed of 7.6 knots (14.1 km/h; 8.7 mph). When submerged, the boat could operate for 80 nautical miles (150 km; 92 mi) at 4 knots (7.4 km/h; 4.6 mph); when surfaced, she could travel 8,500 nautical miles (15,700 km; 9,800 mi) at 10 knots (19 km/h; 12 mph). U-295 was fitted with five 53.3 cm (21 in) torpedo tubes (four fitted at the bow and one at the stern), fourteen torpedoes, one 8.8 cm (3.46 in) SK C/35 naval gun, (220 rounds), one 3.7 cm (1.5 in) Flak M42 and two 2 cm (0.79 in) C/30 anti-aircraft guns. The boat had a complement of between forty-four and sixty.

== Service history ==
The boat's service life began with training with the 8th U-boat Flotilla in October 1943. She was then transferred to the 9th flotilla for operations on 1 August 1944. She was reassigned to the 13th flotilla on 1 October and moved again to the 14th flotilla on 1 April 1945.

=== First and second patrols ===
U-295's first patrol was uneventful.

She then embarked on a series of short journeys between Bergen, Kristiansand, Stavanger and Trondheim.

Her second foray, between Trondheim and Harstad was the most successful. She damaged the British frigate HMS Mounsey east northeast of Murmansk on 2 November 1944.

=== Third and fourth patrols ===
The submarine's third sortie took her into the Barents and Norwegian Seas. She returned to Harstad on 18 December 1944.

Her fourth patrol started in Harstad and finished in Narvik. She had spent three days off Murmansk, to no avail.

=== Fifth patrol ===
Her fifth effort was just as barren, even though it was longer.

=== Sixth patrol and fate ===
The boat departed Narvik on 15 April 1945. Her route took her once again to the Barents Sea. She returned to the Nordic port on 7 May.

She was then moved to Skjomenfjord on 12 May 1945 and in accordance with the surrender terms, she was transferred to Loch Eriboll in northern Scotland for Operation Deadlight on the 19th. She was sunk on 17 December by the guns of ORP Błyskawica.

== Summary of raiding history ==
Date	Ship Name	Nationality	Tonnage (Note: Merchant ship tonnages are in gross register tons. Military vessels are listed by tons displacement.)	Fate
2 November 1944	HMS Mounsey	Royal Navy	1,150	Damaged

== See also ==
- Battle of the Atlantic (1939-1945)

== Bibliography ==
- Busch, Rainer; Röll, Hans-Joachim (1999). German U-boat commanders of World War II : a biographical dictionary. Translated by Brooks, Geoffrey. London, Annapolis, Md: Greenhill Books, Naval Institute Press. ISBN 1-55750-186-6.
- Busch, Rainer; Röll, Hans-Joachim (1999). Deutsche U-Boot-Verluste von September 1939 bis Mai 1945 [German U-boat losses from September 1939 to May 1945]. Der U-Boot-Krieg (in German). Vol. IV. Hamburg, Berlin, Bonn: Mittler. ISBN 3-8132-0514-2.
- Gröner, Erich; Jung, Dieter; Maass, Martin (1991). U-boats and Mine Warfare Vessels. German Warships 1815–1945. Vol. 2. Translated by Thomas, Keith; Magowan, Rachel. London: Conway Maritime Press. ISBN 0-85177-593-4.
