= German submarine U-246 =

German World War II submarine

History

Nazi Germany
- Name: U-246
- Ordered: 10 April 1941
- Builder: Germaniawerft, Kiel
- Yard number: 680
- Laid down: 30 November 1942
- Launched: 7 December 1943
- Commissioned: 11 January 1944
- Fate: Sunk on 17 March 1945

General characteristics
- Class & type: Type VIIC submarine
- Displacement: 769 tonnes (757 long tons) surfaced; 871 t (857 long tons) submerged
- Length: 67.23 m (220 ft 7 in) o/a; 50.50 m (165 ft 8 in) pressure hull
- Beam: 6.20 m (20 ft 4 in) o/a; 4.70 m (15 ft 5 in) pressure hull
- Height: 9.60 m (31 ft 6 in)
- Draught: 4.74 m (15 ft 7 in)
- Installed power: 2,800–3,200 PS (2,100–2,400 kW; 2,800–3,200 bhp) (diesels); 750 PS (550 kW; 740 shp) (electric)
- Propulsion: 2 shafts; 2 × diesel engines; 2 × electric motors
- Speed: 17.7 knots (32.8 km/h; 20.4 mph) surfaced; 7.6 knots (14.1 km/h; 8.7 mph) submerged
- Range: 8,500 nmi (15,700 km; 9,800 mi) at 10 knots (19 km/h; 12 mph) surfaced; 80 nmi (150 km; 92 mi) at 4 knots (7.4 km/h; 4.6 mph) submerged
- Test depth: 230 m (750 ft); Crush depth: 250–295 m (820–968 ft)
- Complement: 4 officers, 40–56 enlisted
- Armament: 5 × 53.3 cm (21 in) torpedo tubes (four bow, one stern); 14 × G7e torpedoes or 26 TMA mines; 1 × 3.7 cm (1.5 in) Flak M42 AA gun; 2 × twin 2 cm (0.79 in) C/30 anti-aircraft guns

Service record
- Part of: 5th U-boat Flotilla; 11 January – 31 July 1944; 3rd U-boat Flotilla; 1 August – 30 September 1944; 11th U-boat Flotilla; 1 October 1944 – 17 March 1945
- Identification codes: M 53 307
- Commanders: Kptlt. Ernst Raabe; 11 January 1944 – 17 March 1945
- Operations: 1st patrol: a. 7 October – 11 November 1944; b. 12 November 1944; 2nd patrol: 21 February – 17 March 1945
- Victories: None

German submarine U-246 was a Type VIIC U-boat of Nazi Germany's Kriegsmarine during World War II. The submarine was laid down on 30 November 1942 at the Friedrich Krupp Germaniawerft yard at Kiel, launched on 7 December 1943 and commissioned on 11 January 1944 under the command of Kapitänleutnant Ernst Raabe.

After training with the 5th U-boat Flotilla at Kiel, U-246 was transferred to the 3rd U-boat Flotilla for front-line service on 1 August 1944. However, before the U-boat had sailed on her first combat patrol the flotilla was disbanded, and the U-boat was transferred to the 11th flotilla based at Bergen in Norway, on 1 October 1944. She was sunk on 17 March 1945.

== Design ==
German Type VIIC submarines were preceded by the shorter Type VIIB submarines. U-246 had a displacement of 769 tonnes (757 long tons) when at the surface and 871 tonnes (857 long tons) while submerged. She had a total length of 67.10 m (220 ft 2 in), a pressure hull length of 50.50 m (165 ft 8 in), a beam of 6.20 m (20 ft 4 in), a height of 9.60 m (31 ft 6 in), and a draught of 4.74 m (15 ft 7 in). The submarine was powered by two Germaniawerft F46 four-stroke, six-cylinder supercharged diesel engines producing a total of 2,800 to 3,200 metric horsepower (2,060 to 2,350 kW; 2,760 to 3,160 shp) for use while surfaced, two AEG GU 460/8–27 double-acting electric motors producing a total of 750 metric horsepower (550 kW; 740 shp) for use while submerged. She had two shafts and two 1.23 m (4 ft) propellers. The boat was capable of operating at depths of up to 230 metres (750 ft).

The submarine had a maximum surface speed of 17.7 knots (32.8 km/h; 20.4 mph) and a maximum submerged speed of 7.6 knots (14.1 km/h; 8.7 mph). When submerged, the boat could operate for 80 nautical miles (150 km; 92 mi) at 4 knots (7.4 km/h; 4.6 mph); when surfaced, she could travel 8,500 nautical miles (15,700 km; 9,800 mi) at 10 knots (19 km/h; 12 mph). U-246 was fitted with five 53.3 cm (21 in) torpedo tubes (four fitted at the bow and one at the stern), fourteen torpedoes, one 3.7 cm (1.5 in) Flak M42 and two twin 2 cm (0.79 in) C/30 anti-aircraft guns. The boat had a complement of between forty-four and sixty.

== Service history ==
U-246 had a very short career. She only participated in two war patrols and did not sink any enemy vessels. Her last report was made on 7 March 1945, while in the middle of her second patrol. Shortly afterwards, she sank due to depth charges from British ASW trawler HMS Lady Madeleine in the Irish Sea with the loss of her entire crew of 48 men.

=== First patrol ===
U-246 sailed from Kiel to Horten Naval Base in Norway, from 28 to 30 September 1944, continuing on to Kristiansand on 4 and 5 October. From there she sailed on her first patrol on 7 October, around the British Isles to the waters south-west of Ireland. On 26 October she was attacked by an unknown Allied aircraft with depth charges, causing severe damage and forcing the U-boat to return to base at Stavanger on 11 November. The next day U-246 sailed from Stavanger to Bergen for repairs.

=== Second patrol ===
The U-boat sailed from Bergen on 21 February 1945. On 7 March she reported for the last time while en route for her operational area in the Irish Sea. No further reports were received, she was sunk on 17 March 1945. Her wreck lies at 53°40′N 04°53′W.

== See also ==
- German U-boat bases in occupied Norway

== Bibliography ==
- Busch, Rainer; Röll, Hans-Joachim (1999). German U-boat commanders of World War II : a biographical dictionary. Translated by Brooks, Geoffrey. London, Annapolis, Md: Greenhill Books, Naval Institute Press. ISBN 1-55750-186-6.
- Busch, Rainer; Röll, Hans-Joachim (1999). Deutsche U-Boot-Verluste von September 1939 bis Mai 1945 [German U-boat losses from September 1939 to May 1945]. Der U-Boot-Krieg (in German). Vol. IV. Hamburg, Berlin, Bonn: Mittler. ISBN 3-8132-0514-2.
- Gröner, Erich; Jung, Dieter; Maass, Martin (1991). U-boats and Mine Warfare Vessels. German Warships 1815–1945. Vol. 2. Translated by Thomas, Keith; Magowan, Rachel. London: Conway Maritime Press. ISBN 0-85177-593-4.
