= German submarine U-988 =

German World War II submarine

History

Nazi Germany
- Name: U-988
- Ordered: 25 May 1941
- Builder: Blohm & Voss, Hamburg
- Yard number: 188
- Laid down: 2 October 1942
- Launched: 3 June 1943
- Commissioned: 15 July 1943
- Fate: Sunk on 22 June 1944

General characteristics
- Class & type: Type VIIC submarine
- Displacement: 769 tonnes (757 long tons) surfaced; 871 t (857 long tons) submerged
- Length: 67.10 m (220 ft 2 in) o/a; 50.50 m (165 ft 8 in) pressure hull
- Beam: 6.20 m (20 ft 4 in) o/a; 4.70 m (15 ft 5 in) pressure hull
- Draught: 4.74 m (15 ft 7 in)
- Installed power: 2,800–3,200 PS (2,100–2,400 kW; 2,800–3,200 bhp) (diesels); 750 PS (550 kW; 740 shp) (electric)
- Propulsion: 2 shafts; 2 × diesel engines; 2 × electric motors
- Speed: 17.7 knots (32.8 km/h; 20.4 mph) surfaced; 7.6 knots (14.1 km/h; 8.7 mph) submerged
- Range: 8,500 nmi (15,700 km; 9,800 mi) at 10 knots (19 km/h; 12 mph) surfaced; 80 nmi (150 km; 92 mi) at 4 knots (7.4 km/h; 4.6 mph) submerged
- Test depth: 230 m (750 ft); Crush depth: 250–295 m (820–968 ft)
- Complement: 4 officers, 40–56 enlisted
- Armament: 5 × 53.3 cm (21 in) torpedo tubes (4 bow, 1 stern); 14 × torpedoes or 26 TMA mines; 1 × 8.8 cm (3.46 in) deck gun (220 rounds); 1 × twin 2 cm (0.79 in) C/30 anti-aircraft gun

Service record
- Part of: 5th U-boat Flotilla; 15 July 1943 – 31 May 1944; 7th U-boat Flotilla; 1 – 22 June 1944
- Identification codes: M 53 999
- Commanders: Oblt.z.S. Erich Dobberstein; 15 July 1943 – 22 June 1944
- Operations: 1 patrol: 22 May – 22 June 1944
- Victories: None

German submarine U-988 was a Type VIIC U-boat built for Nazi Germany's Kriegsmarine for service during World War II. She was laid down on 2 October 1942 by Blohm & Voss, Hamburg as yard number 188, launched on 3 June 1943 and commissioned on 15 July 1943 under Oberleutnant zur See Erich Dobberstein.

== Design ==
German Type VIIC submarines were preceded by the shorter Type VIIB submarines. U-988 had a displacement of 769 tonnes (757 long tons) when at the surface and 871 tonnes (857 long tons) while submerged. She had a total length of 67.10 m (220 ft 2 in), a pressure hull length of 50.50 m (165 ft 8 in), a beam of 6.20 m (20 ft 4 in), a height of 9.60 m (31 ft 6 in), and a draught of 4.74 m (15 ft 7 in). The submarine was powered by two Germaniawerft F46 four-stroke, six-cylinder supercharged diesel engines producing a total of 2,800 to 3,200 metric horsepower (2,060 to 2,350 kW; 2,760 to 3,160 shp) for use while surfaced, two Brown, Boveri & Cie GG UB 720/8 double-acting electric motors producing a total of 750 metric horsepower (550 kW; 740 shp) for use while submerged. She had two shafts and two 1.23 m (4 ft) propellers. The boat was capable of operating at depths of up to 230 metres (750 ft).

The submarine had a maximum surface speed of 17.7 knots (32.8 km/h; 20.4 mph) and a maximum submerged speed of 7.6 knots (14.1 km/h; 8.7 mph). When submerged, the boat could operate for 80 nautical miles (150 km; 92 mi) at 4 knots (7.4 km/h; 4.6 mph); when surfaced, she could travel 8,500 nautical miles (15,700 km; 9,800 mi) at 10 knots (19 km/h; 12 mph). U-988 was fitted with five 53.3 cm (21 in) torpedo tubes (four fitted at the bow and one at the stern), fourteen torpedoes, one 8.8 cm (3.46 in) SK C/35 naval gun, 220 rounds, and one twin 2 cm (0.79 in) C/30 anti-aircraft gun. The boat had a complement of between forty-four and sixty.

== Service history ==
U-988′s career began on 15 July 1943 with training as part of the 5th U-boat Flotilla. On 8 September 1943, she collided with U-983 in the Baltic Sea north of Loba (54°46′N 17°14′E). As a result of the collision, U-983 sank with the loss of five of her 43 crew.

U-988 began active service on 1 June 1944 as part of the 7th U-boat Flotilla.

=== Wolfpacks ===
U-988 took part in no wolfpacks.

=== Fate ===
U-988 was sunk by depth charges from a US Liberator on 22 June 1944. There were no survivors.

=== Previously recorded fate ===
U-988 sent her last radio message on 18 June, informing about an air attack, and was lost with all hands thereafter, and her fate is not certain. It is believed that U-988 attacked three ships on 27–29 June and then was sunk on 29/30 June 1944 in the English Channel west of Guernsey at 49°37′N 03°41′W at dawn by the Royal Navy frigates HMS Essington, HMS Cooke, HMS Duckworth, and HMS Domett, after being damaged by Royal Air Force Liberators of No. 244 Squadron.

=== Alternate fate ===
There appeared however a theory, that U-988 could have been sunk after an attack of Polish Wellington Mk XIV from 304 Squadron, piloted by Leopold Antoniewicz, which was credited with sinking a submarine on 18 June in the approximate position 49°03′N 04°48′W. Then, the submarine sank on 29/30 June could have been U-1191.

== Bibliography ==
- Busch, Rainer; Röll, Hans-Joachim (1999). German U-boat commanders of World War II : a biographical dictionary. Translated by Brooks, Geoffrey. London, Annapolis, Md: Greenhill Books, Naval Institute Press. ISBN 1-55750-186-6.
- Gröner, Erich; Jung, Dieter; Maass, Martin (1991). U-boats and Mine Warfare Vessels. German Warships 1815–1945. Vol. 2. Translated by Thomas, Keith; Magowan, Rachel. London: Conway Maritime Press. ISBN 0-85177-593-4.
- Kemp, Paul (1997). Ships hit by U-Boats Destroyed – German Submarine Losses in the World Wars. Arms and Armour Press. p. 200. ISBN 1-85409-321-5.
- Sharpe, Peter (1998). Ships hit by U-Boat Fact File. Great Britain: Midland Publishing. ISBN 1-85780-072-9.
