= German submarine U-618 =

German World War II submarine

History

Nazi Germany
- Name: U-618
- Ordered: 15 August 1940
- Builder: Blohm & Voss, Hamburg
- Yard number: 594
- Laid down: 29 May 1941
- Launched: 20 February 1942
- Commissioned: 16 April 1942
- Fate: Sunk on 14 August 1944

General characteristics
- Class & type: Type VIIC submarine
- Displacement: 769 tonnes (757 long tons) surfaced; 871 t (857 long tons) submerged
- Length: 67.10 m (220 ft 2 in) o/a; 50.50 m (165 ft 8 in) pressure hull
- Beam: 6.20 m (20 ft 4 in) o/a; 4.70 m (15 ft 5 in) pressure hull
- Height: 9.60 m (31 ft 6 in)
- Draught: 4.74 m (15 ft 7 in)
- Installed power: 2,800–3,200 PS (2,100–2,400 kW; 2,800–3,200 bhp) (diesels); 750 PS (550 kW; 740 shp) (electric)
- Propulsion: 2 shafts; 2 × diesel engines; 2 × electric motors
- Speed: 17.7 knots (32.8 km/h; 20.4 mph) surfaced; 7.6 knots (14.1 km/h; 8.7 mph) submerged
- Range: 8,500 nmi (15,700 km; 9,800 mi) at 10 knots (19 km/h; 12 mph) surfaced; 80 nmi (150 km; 92 mi) at 4 knots (7.4 km/h; 4.6 mph) submerged
- Test depth: 230 m (750 ft); Crush depth: 250–295 m (820–968 ft)
- Complement: 4 officers, 40–56 enlisted
- Armament: 5 × 53.3 cm (21 in) torpedo tubes (four bow, one stern); 14 × torpedoes or 26 TMA mines; 1 × 8.8 cm (3.46 in) deck gun (220 rounds); 1 x 2 cm (0.79 in) C/30 AA gun

Service record
- Part of: 5th U-boat Flotilla; 16 April – 31 August 1942; 7th U-boat Flotilla; 1 September 1942 – 14 August 1944
- Identification codes: M 46 602
- Commanders: Oblt.z.S. / Kptlt. Kurt Baberg; 16 April 1942 – 15 April 1944; Oblt.z.S. Erich Faust; 16 April – 14 August 1944
- Operations: 10 patrols: 1st patrol: 1 September – 28 October 1942; 2nd patrol: 25 November 1942 – 18 January 1943; 3rd patrol: 21 February – 7 May 1943; 4th patrol: 8 June – 5 September 1943; 5th patrol: 11 November 1943 – 4 January 1944; 6th patrol: 23 February – 8 April 1944; 7th patrol: 25 May 1944; 8th patrol: 26 – 30 July 1944; 9th patrol: 2 – 4 August 1944; 10th patrol: 11 – 14 August 1944
- Victories: 3 merchant ships sunk (15,788 GRT)

German submarine U-618 was a Type VIIC U-boat built for Nazi Germany's Kriegsmarine for service during World War II. She was laid down on 29 May 1941 by Blohm & Voss, Hamburg as yard number 594, launched on 20 February 1942 and commissioned on 16 April 1942 under Oberleutnant zur See Kurt Baberg.

== Design ==
German Type VIIC submarines were preceded by the shorter Type VIIB submarines. U-618 had a displacement of 769 tonnes (757 long tons) when at the surface and 871 tonnes (857 long tons) while submerged. She had a total length of 67.10 m (220 ft 2 in), a pressure hull length of 50.50 m (165 ft 8 in), a beam of 6.20 m (20 ft 4 in), a height of 9.60 m (31 ft 6 in), and a draught of 4.74 m (15 ft 7 in). The submarine was powered by two Germaniawerft F46 four-stroke, six-cylinder supercharged diesel engines producing a total of 2,800 to 3,200 metric horsepower (2,060 to 2,350 kW; 2,760 to 3,160 shp) for use while surfaced, two Brown, Boveri & Cie GG UB 720/8 double-acting electric motors producing a total of 750 metric horsepower (550 kW; 740 shp) for use while submerged. She had two shafts and two 1.23 m (4 ft) propellers. The boat was capable of operating at depths of up to 230 metres (750 ft).

The submarine had a maximum surface speed of 17.7 knots (32.8 km/h; 20.4 mph) and a maximum submerged speed of 7.6 knots (14.1 km/h; 8.7 mph). When submerged, the boat could operate for 80 nautical miles (150 km; 92 mi) at 4 knots (7.4 km/h; 4.6 mph); when surfaced, she could travel 8,500 nautical miles (15,700 km; 9,800 mi) at 10 knots (19 km/h; 12 mph). U-618 was fitted with five 53.3 cm (21 in) torpedo tubes (four fitted at the bow and one at the stern), fourteen torpedoes, one 8.8 cm (3.46 in) SK C/35 naval gun, 220 rounds, and a 2 cm (0.79 in) C/30 anti-aircraft gun. The boat had a complement of between forty-four and sixty.

== Service history ==
The boat's career began with training at 5th U-boat Flotilla on 16 April 1942, followed by active service on 1 September 1942 as part of the 7th Flotilla for the remainder of her service.

In ten patrols she sank three merchant ships, for a total of 15,788 gross register tons (GRT).

=== 1943 ===
On 20 November 1943, U-618 shot down an RAF Liberator bomber of 53 Squadron near to Convoy SL 139.

On 30 December 1943, U-618 rescued 21 survivors from German destroyer Z27 and her escort. Earlier U-505 had rescued 34, and MV Kerlogue (Ireland) had rescued 164.

=== 1944 ===
On 19 March 1944, U-618, while trying to enter the Mediterranean Sea, sustained a week long sustained Allied attack from both aircraft and surface ships before being forced to return to France with heavy battle damage.

On 6 April 1944, U-618 was attacked by a RCAF Liberator bomber. She was able to return fire and damage the aircraft sufficiently that the air attack was broken off.

On 30 July 1944, U-618 shot down an RAF Wellington bomber in the Bay of Biscay. All six of the aircrew were killed when the bomber crashed into the sea.

=== Fate ===
U-618 was sunk on 14 August 1944 in the North Atlantic in position 47°22′N 04°39′W, by depth charges from HMS Duckworth, HMS Essington and RAF Liberator. All hands were lost.

=== Wolfpacks ===
U-618 took part in 18 wolfpacks, namely:

- Pfeil (12 – 22 September 1942)
- Blitz (22 – 26 September 1942)
- Tiger (26 – 30 September 1942)
- Wotan (5 – 19 October 1942)
- Neuland (4 – 6 March 1943)
- Ostmark (6 – 11 March 1943)
- Stürmer (11 – 20 March 1943)
- Seewolf (21 – 30 March 1943)
- Adler (11 – 13 April 1943)
- Meise (13 – 20 April 1943)
- Specht (21 – 25 April 1943)
- Schill 3 (18 – 22 November 1943)
- Weddigen (22 November – 7 December 1943)
- Coronel (7 – 8 December 1943)
- Coronel 2 (8 – 14 December 1943)
- Coronel 3 (14 – 17 December 1943)
- Borkum (18 – 26 December 1943)
- Hela (28 December 1943 – 1 January 1944)

== Summary of raiding history ==
Date	Ship Name	Nationality	Tonnage (GRT)	Fate
14 October 1942	Empire Mersey	United Kingdom	5,791	Sunk
18 October 1942	Angelina	United States	4,772	Sunk
2 July 1943	Empire Kohinoor	United Kingdom	5,225	Sunk

== See also ==
- Convoy SC 104

== Bibliography ==
- Busch, Rainer; Röll, Hans-Joachim (1999). German U-boat commanders of World War II : a biographical dictionary. Translated by Brooks, Geoffrey. London, Annapolis, Md: Greenhill Books, Naval Institute Press. ISBN 1-55750-186-6.
- Busch, Rainer; Röll, Hans-Joachim (1999). Der U-Boot-Krieg, 1939-1945: Deutsche U-Boot-Verluste von September 1939 bis Mai 1945 [German U-boat losses from September 1939 to May 1945] (in German). Vol. IV. Hamburg, Berlin, Bonn: Mittler. ISBN 3-8132-0514-2.
- Gröner, Eric; Jung, Dieter; Maass, Martin (1991). German Warships 1815-1945: U-boats and Mine Warfare Vessels. Vol. 2. Translated by Thomas, Keith; Magowan, Rachel. London: Conway Maritime Press. ISBN 0-85177-593-4.
- Sharpe, Peter (1998). U-Boat Fact File. Great Britain: Midland Publishing. ISBN 1-85780-072-9.
