= German submarine U-445 =

German world war II submarine

History

Nazi Germany
- Name: U-445
- Ordered: 6 August 1940
- Builder: Schichau-Werke, Danzig
- Yard number: 1505
- Laid down: 9 April 1941
- Launched: 19 March 1942
- Commissioned: 30 May 1942
- Fate: Sunk in the Bay of Biscay on 24 August 1944

General characteristics
- Class & type: Type VIIC submarine
- Displacement: 769 tonnes (757 long tons) surfaced; 871 t (857 long tons) submerged
- Length: 67.10 m (220 ft 2 in) o/a; 50.50 m (165 ft 8 in) pressure hull
- Beam: 6.20 m (20 ft 4 in) o/a; 4.70 m (15 ft 5 in) pressure hull
- Height: 9.60 m (31 ft 6 in)
- Draught: 4.74 m (15 ft 7 in)
- Installed power: 2,800–3,200 PS (2,100–2,400 kW; 2,800–3,200 bhp) (diesels); 750 PS (550 kW; 740 shp) (electric)
- Propulsion: 2 shafts; 2 × diesel engines; 2 × electric motors
- Speed: 17.7 knots (32.8 km/h; 20.4 mph) surfaced; 7.6 knots (14.1 km/h; 8.7 mph) submerged
- Range: 8,500 nmi (15,700 km; 9,800 mi) at 10 knots (19 km/h; 12 mph) surfaced; 80 nmi (150 km; 92 mi) at 4 knots (7.4 km/h; 4.6 mph) submerged
- Test depth: 230 m (750 ft); Crush depth: 250–295 m (820–968 ft)
- Complement: 4 officers, 40–56 enlisted
- Armament: 5 × 53.3 cm (21 in) torpedo tubes (four bow, one stern); 14 × torpedoes; 1 × 8.8 cm (3.46 in) deck gun (220 rounds); 1 x 2 cm (0.79 in) C/30 AA gun

Service record
- Part of: 8th U-boat Flotilla; 30 May – 31 October 1942; 6th U-boat Flotilla; 1 November 1942 – 24 August 1944
- Identification codes: M 06 411
- Commanders: Oblt.z.S. Heinz-Konrad Fenn; 30 May 1942 – 27 January 1944; Oblt.z.S. Rupprecht Fishler, Graf von Treuberg; 27 January – 24 August 1944
- Operations: 9 patrols: 1st patrol: 8 November 1942 – 3 January 1943; 2nd patrol: 7 February – 27 March 1942; 3rd patrol: 27 – 30 April 1943; 4th patrol: a. 10 July – 15 September 1943; b. 9 – 10 November 1943; 5th patrol: 25 November 1943 – 10 January 1944; 6th patrol: 1 – 27 February 1944; 7th patrol: 6 – 15 June 1944; 8th patrol: 12 – 17 August 1944; 9th patrol: 22 – 24 August 1944
- Victories: None

German submarine U-445 was a Type VIIC U-boat of Nazi Germany's Kriegsmarine during World War II.

She carried out nine patrols. She sank no ships.

She was a member of six wolfpacks.

She was sunk in the Bay of Biscay by a British warship on 24 August 1944.

== Design ==
German Type VIIC submarines were preceded by the shorter Type VIIB submarines. U-445 had a displacement of 769 tonnes (757 long tons) when at the surface and 871 tonnes (857 long tons) while submerged. She had a total length of 67.10 m (220 ft 2 in), a pressure hull length of 50.50 m (165 ft 8 in), a beam of 6.20 m (20 ft 4 in), a height of 9.60 m (31 ft 6 in), and a draught of 4.74 m (15 ft 7 in). The submarine was powered by two Germaniawerft F46 four-stroke, six-cylinder supercharged diesel engines producing a total of 2,800 to 3,200 metric horsepower (2,060 to 2,350 kW; 2,760 to 3,160 shp) for use while surfaced, two AEG GU 460/8–27 double-acting electric motors producing a total of 750 metric horsepower (550 kW; 740 shp) for use while submerged. She had two shafts and two 1.23 m (4 ft) propellers. The boat was capable of operating at depths of up to 230 metres (750 ft).

The submarine had a maximum surface speed of 17.7 knots (32.8 km/h; 20.4 mph) and a maximum submerged speed of 7.6 knots (14.1 km/h; 8.7 mph). When submerged, the boat could operate for 80 nautical miles (150 km; 92 mi) at 4 knots (7.4 km/h; 4.6 mph); when surfaced, she could travel 8,500 nautical miles (15,700 km; 9,800 mi) at 10 knots (19 km/h; 12 mph). U-445 was fitted with five 53.3 cm (21 in) torpedo tubes (four fitted at the bow and one at the stern), fourteen torpedoes, one 8.8 cm (3.46 in) SK C/35 naval gun, 220 rounds, and a 2 cm (0.79 in) C/30 anti-aircraft gun. The boat had a complement of between forty-four and sixty.

== Service history ==
The submarine was laid down on 9 April 1941 at Schichau-Werke in Danzig (now Gdansk, Poland) as yard number 1505, launched on 19 March 1942 and commissioned on 30 May under the command of Oberleutnant zur See Heinz-Konrad Fenn.

She served with the 8th U-boat Flotilla from 30 May 1942 for training and the 6th flotilla from 1 November 1942 for operations.

=== First patrol ===
U-432's first patrol was preceded by the short journey from Kiel in Germany to Marviken. The patrol itself commenced with her departure from Marviken on 8 November 1942. She proceeded via the gap separating the Faroe and Shetland Islands and into the Atlantic Ocean. She arrived at St. Nazaire in occupied France on 3 January 1943.

=== Second and third patrols ===
Her second sortie was carried out north of the Azores and west of Gibraltar.

The submarine's third patrol was relatively uneventful.

=== Fourth and fifth patrols ===
The boat's fourth patrol was, at 68 days, her longest. It took her to the west coast of Africa. The most southerly point, between South America and Africa, was reached on 12 August 1943.

She was attacked on patrol number five by a Handley Page Halifax of No. 58 Squadron RAF in the western Bay of Biscay on 2 January 1944. No damage was sustained.

=== Sixth patrol ===
She fired at what her crew thought was a destroyer west of Ireland on 14 February 1944. Retaliation was swift; the Third Support Group caused severe damage, but the U-boat escaped.

=== Seventh and eighth patrols ===
U-445's seventh outing was relatively short, from 6–15 June 1944. She did not leave the Bay of Biscay, but she did move to La Pallice, south of St. Nazaire.

Her eighth patrol was also brief and entailed another move; this time to Lorient.

=== Ninth patrol and loss ===
U-445 was sunk in the Bay of Biscay by depth charges dropped by the British frigate HMS Louis on 24 August 1944.

Fifty-two men died; there were no survivors.

=== Wolfpacks ===
U-445 took part in six wolfpacks, namely:

- Drachen (22 November – 3 December 1942)
- Panzer (3 – 9 December 1942)
- Büffel (9 – 15 December 1942)
- Ungestüm (15 – 25 December 1942)
- Robbe (16 February – 13 March 1943)
- Igel 2 (6 – 14 February 1944)

== Bibliography ==
- Busch, Rainer; Röll, Hans-Joachim (1999). German U-boat commanders of World War II : a biographical dictionary. Translated by Brooks, Geoffrey. London, Annapolis, Md: Greenhill Books, Naval Institute Press. ISBN 1-55750-186-6.
- Busch, Rainer; Röll, Hans-Joachim (1999). Deutsche U-Boot-Verluste von September 1939 bis Mai 1945 [German U-boat losses from September 1939 to May 1945]. Der U-Boot-Krieg (in German). Vol. IV. Hamburg, Berlin, Bonn: Mittler. ISBN 3-8132-0514-2.
- Gröner, Erich; Jung, Dieter; Maass, Martin (1991). U-boats and Mine Warfare Vessels. German Warships 1815–1945. Vol. 2. Translated by Thomas, Keith; Magowan, Rachel. London: Conway Maritime Press. ISBN 0-85177-593-4.
- Kemp, Paul (1999). U-Boats Destroyed – German Submarine Losses in the World Wars. London: Arms & Armour. ISBN 1-85409-515-3.
