= HMS Mounsey (K569) =

Royal Navy Captain-class frigate

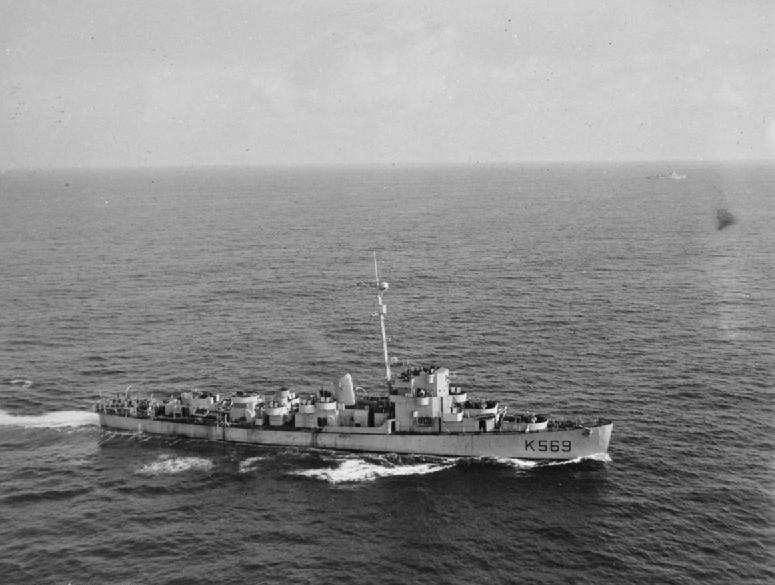
- HMS Mounsey on 20 August 1944.

History

United States
- Name: unnamed (DE-524)
- Builder: Boston Navy Yard, Boston, Massachusetts
- Laid down: 14 August 1943
- Launched: 24 September 1943
- Completed: 23 December 1943
- Fate: Transferred to United Kingdom 23 December 1943
- Acquired: Returned by United Kingdom 25 or 27 February 1946
- Stricken: 28 March 1946
- Fate: Sold 8 November 1946 for scrapping; Scrapping completed 4 November 1948

United Kingdom
- Name: HMS Mounsey (K569)
- Namesake: Captain William Mounsey (1766–1830), British naval officer who was commanding officer of HMS Bonne Citoyenne when she captured the French Navy frigate Furieuse in 1809
- Acquired: 23 December 1943
- Commissioned: 24 December 1943
- Decommissioned: February 1946
- Fate: Returned to United States 25 or 27 February 1946

General characteristics
- Displacement: 1,140 long tons (1,158 t)
- Length: 289.5 ft (88.2 m)
- Beam: 35 ft (11 m)
- Draught: 9 ft (2.7 m)
- Propulsion: Four General Motors 278A 16-cylinder engines; GE 7,040 bhp (5,250 kW) generators (4,800 kW); GE electric motors for 6,000 shp (4,500 kW); Two shafts
- Speed: 20 knots (37 km/h)
- Range: 5,000 nautical miles (9,260 km) at 15 knots (28 km/h)
- Complement: 156
- Sensors & processing systems: SA & SL type radars; Type 144 series Asdic; MF Direction Finding antenna; HF Direction Finding Type FH 4 antenna
- Armament: 3 × 3 in (76 mm) /50 Mk.22 guns; 1 × twin Bofors 40 mm mount Mk.I; 7–16 × 20 mm Oerlikon guns; Mark 10 Hedgehog antisubmarine mortar; Depth charges; QF 2-pounder naval gun

The second HMS Mounsey (K569) was a British Captain-class frigate of the Royal Navy in commission during World War II. Originally constructed as the United States Navy Evarts-class destroyer escort DE-524, she served in the Royal Navy from 1943 to 1946.

== Construction and transfer ==
The ship was laid down as the unnamed U.S. Navy destroyer escort DE-524 by the Boston Navy Yard in Boston, Massachusetts, on 14 August 1943 and launched on 24 September 1943. The United States transferred the ship to the United Kingdom under Lend-Lease on 23 December 1943.

== Service history ==
The ship was commissioned into service in the Royal Navy as HMS Mounsey (K569) on 24 December 1943, the day after her transfer. She served on escort duty, protecting convoys in the North Atlantic Ocean as well as Arctic convoys carrying equipment and supplies to the Soviet Union. She also operated in support of the Allied invasion of Normandy in the summer of 1944.

On 2 November 1944, Mounsey was escorting Convoy RA 61 in the Barents Sea outbound from the Soviet Union when the German submarine U-295 damaged her with a G7es – known to the Allies as "GNAT" – acoustic torpedo, forcing her to return to the Kola Inlet for temporary repairs. Once those repairs were complete, she departed the Soviet Union with Convoy RA 62 and returned to the United Kingdom for permanent repairs, after which she returned to service.

At 2300 hours on 10 May 1945, just after the end of World War II, Mounsey accepted the surrender of the German submarine U-1023, which held the distinction of being the last German submarine to sink an Allied warship during the war, off Land's End. The submarine later made a well-publicised tour of British ports.

Early in 1946, Mounsey steamed to the United States, arriving at the Philadelphia Naval Shipyard in Philadelphia, Pennsylvania, on 7 February 1946. The Royal Navy returned her to the U.S. Navy there on either 25 or 27 February 1946 (sources vary).

== Disposal ==
Mounsey officially was declared not essential to the defense of the United States on 6 March 1946, and the U.S. Navy struck her from its Naval Vessel Register on 28 March 1946. She was sold to the North American Smelting Company of Philadelphia on 8 November 1948 for scrapping, which was completed on 9 November 1948.
