= No. 244 Squadron RAF =

Royal Air Force squadron

- Active: 25 July 1918 – 22 January 1919; 1 November 1940 – 1 May 1945
- Country: United Kingdom
- Branch: Royal Air Force
- Motto: None

Insignia
- Squadron Badge: None
- Squadron Codes: VM (Apr 1939 – Sep 1939)

No. 244 Squadron RAF was a Royal Air Force Squadron formed as an anti–submarine unit in World War I and a bomber and anti-submarine unit in the Middle East in World War II.

== History ==
=== Formation and World War I ===
No. 244 Squadron Royal Flying Corps was formed on 25 July 1918 as part of the reorganization of 255 Squadron and operated DH.6s from Bangor, Wales on anti-submarine patrols and disbanded on 22 January 1919.

=== Reformation in World War II ===
'S' Squadron was reformed at RAF Habbaniya in Iraq on 21 August 1939 by re-designating the Communication Flight, Iraq & Persia. When 'S' squadron moved to RAF Shaibah on 1 November 1940 it was redesignated No. 244 Squadron RAF. It was equipped with Vincents and was involved in quelling the Iraqi uprising in May 1941. It re-equipped in April 1942 with Blenheims for anti-submarine patrols and in May 1942 moved to RAF Sharjah in Sharjah. Whilst based at RAF Sharjah there were detachment to airfields at Jask, Ras al Hadd and Masirah. Wellingtons were delivered in February 1944 and the squadron moved to RAF Masirah on Masirah Island where it continued anti-submarine patrols. The Squadron was disbanded there on 1 May 1945.

== Aircraft operated ==
Aircraft operated by no. 244 Squadron RAF
From	To	Aircraft	Variant
Jul 1918	Jan 1919	Airco DH.6	
Nov 1940	Jan 1943	Vickers Vincent	IIB
Apr 1942	Dec 1942	Bristol Blenheim	IV
Oct 1942	Apr 1944	Bristol Blenheim	V
Feb 1944	May 1945	Vickers Wellington	XIII
