= HMS Speedwell =

Fifteen ships of the Royal Navy and its predecessors have borne the name Speedwell:

- English ship Speedwell (1560) was a galley captured from the French in 1560 and broken up in 1580.
- English ship Swiftsure (1573) was a 41-gun galleon, rebuilt in 1592, renamed Speedwell and rearmed to 40 guns in 1607, and was lost in 1624.
- HMS Speedwell (1660) was a 20-gun ship, launched in 1656 as Cheriton, renamed HMS Speedwell in 1660, and wrecked in 1676.
- HMS Speedwell (1688) was an 8-gun fireship purchased in 1688 and sunk as a breakwater in 1692.
- HMS Speedwell (1690) was an 8-gun fireship, rebuilt in 1702 as a 28-gun fifth rate, and wrecked in 1720.
- HMS Speedwell (1744) was a 14-gun sloop-of-war launched in 1744 and sold in 1750.
- HMS Speedwell (1752) was an 8-gun sloop, converted to a fireship and renamed HMS Spitfire in 1779, and sold in 1780.
- HMS Speedwell (1761) was a cutter of unknown origin, that the French captured in 1761.
- HMS Speedwell (1775) was an 18-gun sloop listed in 1775 that the Spanish frigate Santa Bárbara captured on 26 October 1781 near Gibraltar.
- HMS Speedwell (1780) was a 16-gun cutter purchased in 1780, converted to a brig in 1796, and foundered in 1807.
- HMS Speedwell (1815) was a 5-gun schooner purchased in 1815 and sold in 1834.
- HMS Speedwell (1841) was a survey cutter purchased in 1841 and sold in 1855.
- HMS Speedwell (1861) was a wooden screw Philomel-class gunvessel launched in 1861 and broken up in 1876.
- HMS Speedwell (1889) was a torpedo gunboat, converted to a minesweeper in 1909, and was sold in 1920.
- HMS Speedwell (J87) was a Halcyon-class minesweeper launched in 1935, renamed Topaz and sold into civilian service in 1946.
- Speedwell, possibly a Revenue cutter or a privateer, captured two French privateers in early December 1782 near Weymouth. One was Complaisant, and the other was Poisson Volant. This Speedwell does not appear to be HMS Speedwell as at that time the latter was at Gibraltar.

== See also ==
- HM Hired armed lugger Speedwell
- HMS Speedwell Prize
- HMS Speedy
- Speedwell (ship), for other ships named Speedwell
- Speedwell (disambiguation)
