= Barges of the Wey Navigation =

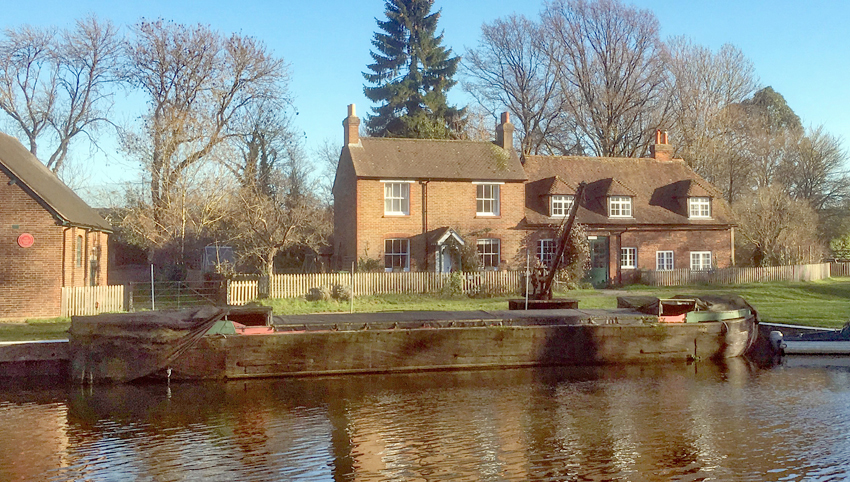
Wey barge Perseverance IV moored at Dapdune Wharf

The Wey barge was based on the earlier West Country barge designs and the first barges built specifically for use on the Wey were probably built at Honeystreet Wharf, near Devizes. The earliest that this could be was 1810 as the Kennet and Avon Canal was opened through to the Thames that year.

== Barge building ==
There is little evidence of barge building on the Wey before 1876. Many of the barges used before then were constructed at the Honeystreet Wharf near Devizes. The Kennet and Avon Canal opened in 1810 which allowed the passage of barges to enter the Thames and thus the Wey. The first barges from here to be used on the Wey were known as "West Country" or "Western" barges which were designed to be used on the western waterways such as the Kennet and Avon Canal and the Thames and Severn Canal. These became the standard for the Wey Navigation.

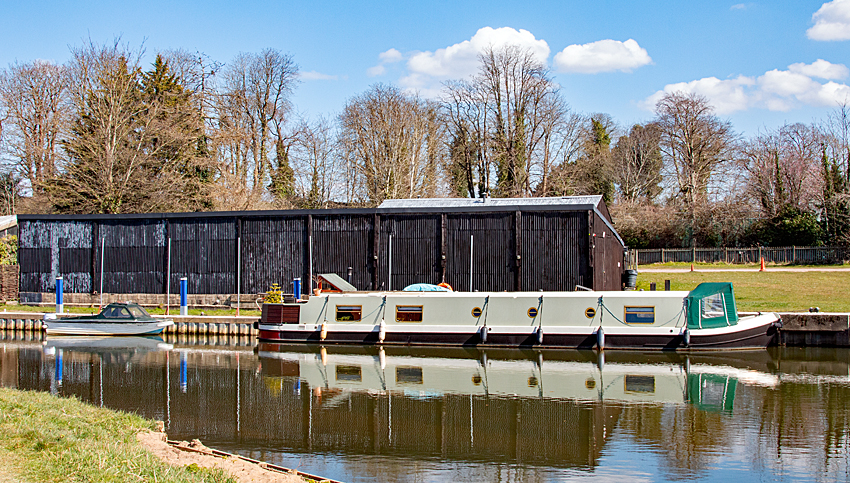
Barge building shed at Dapdune Wharf

Around 1876 the Edwards family moved from Honeystreet to Dapdune Wharf setting up a barge building business. The Surrey Advertiser published an article in 1909 on the launch of the barge Dapdune built by George Edwards and his three sons.

== Types of barges ==
The main method of propulsion on the navigation was by horse. Barges were rowed, sailed or towed by larger vessels from the various London quays to Thames Lock at Weybridge where they were 'horsed up' for a price of 9/6d.: The sizes of these barges were determined by the size of the locks they needed to travel through. These were

Lock sizes
Canal	Length	Width
River Wey and Navigation	73 ft 6 in (22.40 m)	13 ft 10.5 in (4.229 m)
Basingstoke Canal	72 ft 6 in (22.10 m)	13 ft 6 in (4.11 m)
Wey and Arun Canal	74 ft 9 in (22.78 m)	13 ft 0 in (3.96 m)

== Construction ==
Typical Wey barge design

The barges were generally a flat structure with a small cabin at the stern and a locker in the bows for stowing ropes and other equipment. The cargo hold was covered by either wooden hatches or a canvas tarpaulin which were held above the cargo by the hatch beam.

The boats were built in a large shed at the north end of the wharf. The ribs of the hull were built from oak. There was a steam chest behind the shed where the wood could be shaped. However the Edwards family preferred to find wood naturally shaped.

The hull was planked with pitch pine. Pitch pine was used because it was lightweight and came in long lengths so required less joints. Elm was tried, and although it was more water resistant, it was heavier and therefore the barge had a lower cargo capacity. The gaps between the planks were sealed by caulking, a process involving mixing a fibrous substance, often unpicked old rope, with tar and ramming the mixture into the joints while the tar was hot.

The barge was flat bottomed and straight sided, this meant that it could operate in shallow water with a reasonable cargo, also it could be safely grounded in tidal waters. Once the hull was complete it was covered in pitch to create a watertight finish. The barge was built on trestles to keep it off the ground and assist in launching. Only the hull was built in the shed. On completion the water side of the shed was removed and the barge was launched sideways into the river. The barge was then towed up to the area where the pleasure boats are moored today and it was here that fitting out was completed. This was also the area used to repair barges.

The Wey barge was 73 ft 6 in (22.40 m) in length and the width was constrained by the narrowest lock to 13 ft 10.5 in (4.229 m). A barge would have only inches to spare when going through the lock. They could carry 80 tonnes of cargo from the Thames to Coxes mill. From Coxes going upstream the capacity was reduced to 50 tonnes as far as Guildford and further reduced for the journey to Godalming owing to the decrease in the depth of water available.

== Barges of the Wey Navigations ==
Over time there have been many barges, each with its own name. Names were reused, such as Perseverance which has been used on four different barges.

Name	Date	Built	Registered	Number	Notes
Arun	1846				Recorded in Stevens Barge Master Accounts
Reliance	1847				Recorded in Stevens Barge Master Accounts
	1885				Recorded in Stevens Barge Master Accounts
Perseverance	1877				Recorded in Stevens Barge Master Accounts
Industry	1880				Complaint letter about 'Captain Cox worse for drink'
	1880				Recorded in Stevens Barge Master Accounts
Providence	1907				Insurance Premium
	1880				Recorded in Stevens Barge Master Accounts
Diligent	1907				Insurance Premium
	1885				Recorded in Stevens Barge Master Accounts
Hope	1885				Recorded in Stevens Barge Master Accounts
Wey	1907				Insurance Premium
	1895				Recorded in Stevens Barge Master Accounts
Alert	1907				Insurance Premium
	1895				Recorded in Stevens Barge Master Accounts
Surrey	1907				Insurance Premium
Unity	1907				Insurance Premium
Dapdune	1909	1909	31/03/1910	8848	Built Dapdune Wharf, Launched, last used Oct-1940
Industry (II or later)	1913	1913	5/12/1913	8833	Built Dapdune Wharf, Last Used Nov-1946
Providence (II or later)	1914	1914		8830	Built Dapdune Wharf
Wey (II or later)	1914	1914	18/10/1915	8843	Built Dapdune Wharf, Last used May-1951
Kate	1915	1915	4/04/1917	8848	Built Dapdune Wharf
Victory	1920	1920	18/10/1913	8840	Built Dapdune Wharf, Last used Nov-1956
Renown	1923	1923	8/03/1924	8812	Built Dapdune Wharf, Last used Jun-1956
Speedwell	1924	1924	19/10/1925	13298	Built Dapdune Wharf, Last used Jun-1969
Hope (II or later)	1929	1929	06/09/1929	5507	Built Dapdune Wharf, Last used Jan-1969
Reliance (II or Later)	1931	1931	25/07/1932	14652	Built Dapdune Wharf
Perseverance IV	1934	1934	04/06/1937	15639	Built Dapdune Wharf, Last used Jun-1969

== Usage ==
The Wey and Godalming Navigations was a major distribution route for the distribution of goods in south England and along with the Wey and Arun Canal it provided an inland route from London to the South Coast. The goods transported varied from gunpowder from the Gunpowder Mills at Chilworth to more usual raw materials such as timber, coal, grain and wool. The amount of goods that could be carried was governed by the size of the barges used which were restricted by the size of the locks in the various waterways. As each waterway was constructed and owned by a different company the size of the locks varied.
