= Speedwell (ship) =

Speedwell could refer to the following ships:

== Sailing ships ==
- Speedwell (1577 ship), transported Pilgrims with Mayflower in 1620
- Speedwell, a different vessel of the same name and size as the 1577 ship travelled to North America in 1603 under Martin Pring
- Speedwell, in 1656 made a voyage from England to Boston, carrying a party of Quakers including Christopher Holder and John Copeland. Arriving in Massachusetts Bay Colony under the Governorship of John Endecott, they were deported for religious reasons and obliged to return to Britain. In the following year another party, including six of the Speedwell company, returned via Rhode Island aboard Woodhouse: one of them became one of the Boston martyrs, judicially executed by Endecott.
- Speedwell, built in 1663 by Francis Baylie in Bristol, England
- Speedwell, privateer, captained by George Shelvocke, wrecked 1720
- Speedwell, in 1751 made a voyage from Rotterdam to Halifax, Nova Scotia, carrying a party of "Foreign Protestants" including Johann Andreas Fultz. Captained by a Joseph Wilson, she left Rotterdam on 18 May 1751 with 229 passengers, and arrived in Halifax with 212, on either 10 or 21 July 1751.
- Speedwell, in 1761 arrived in New London, Connecticut, captained by Timothy Miller. The ship left the region of Senegambia with 95 slaves aboard. According to the New London Gazette, the ship landed in New London with 74 slaves surviving the voyage.
- Speedwell, merchant ship operated by Madras trading firm Jourdain, Sullivan & Desouza and captained by Francis Light, founder of Penang, in the 1760s

== Naval and coastguard ships ==
- HMS Speedwell, the name of several ships of the Royal Navy
- HMRC Speedwell (1797), later HMS Linnet
- USS Hancock (1775), the former schooner Speedwell
- Speedwell (WAGL-245), a Speedwell-class USCG seagoing buoy tender

== Other users ==
- Speedwell, a Wey barge in the UK National Waterways Museum

== See also ==
- Speedwell (disambiguation)
