= HM hired armed lugger Cockchafer =

History

Great Britain
- Name: HM hired armed lugger Cockchafer
- Namesake: Cockchafer
- In service: 6 May 1794
- Fate: Foundered 1 November 1801

General characteristics
- Tons burthen: 3680/94 (bm)
- Armament: 8 guns

HM hired armed lugger Cockchafer was a hired armed vessel, possibly actually a shallop, that served the Royal Navy from 6 May 1794 to her loss on 2 November 1801.

== Career ==
On 8 June 1794 Cockchafer played a small, ignoble part in a striking encounter between a frigate squadron under the Guernseyman Captain Sir James Saumarez, and a larger, stronger French squadron. On 6 June, Saumarez received an order from Admiral Macbride to take frigates Crescent and Druid, the 24-gun post ship Eurydice, and six cutters and luggers (Cockchafer and Valiant among them), to Guernsey and Jersey, and then to reconnoiter the French coast around Cancale and Saint Malo for signs of the French fleet.

The squadron sailed on 7 June and on 8 June they were some leagues northwest of Guernsey when Saumarez sighted six sails in the distance. He did not think they were French, but he sent Valiant to investigate. As Valiant approached, the vessels hoisted French colours and fired on her. The French squadron sailed between the cutters and luggers on the one side and the three British ships on the other, so the small vessels fled back to Plymouth.

Valiant was the first to arrive at Plymouth. When Cockchafer reached Plymouth, Mr. Hall, of Cockchafer, reported to Rear-Admiral John MacBride that the French had captured Captain Saumarez and his frigates. MacBride asked Hall if he had seen the frigates captured. Hall replied that he had not, but that the British frigates could not have escaped. MacBride lost his temper and ordered Hall to sail back to Guernsey to deliver a letter to Saumarez.

Saumarez had escaped the French by leading them south towards the Hannoways, both sides firing at each other but at such a distance that the fire was pro forma. He sent Eurydice, his slowest ship, ahead, while Crescent and Druid turned towards the Guernsey coast. Saumarez then sent Druid after Eurydice. Both vessels made it around the south coast of Guernsey into Saint Peter Port. Saumarez sailed close to Guernsey's western shore and through some rocks. What made this possible was that Saumarez's pilot, Jean Breton, a Guernseyman, knew the waters well. The French gave up the chase, not being willing to risk their vessels in rocky waters they did not know. Tacking back and forth, Crescent sailed around Guernsey's north side and then south to Saint Peter Port.

Cockchafer was at Plymouth on 20 January 1795 and so shared in the proceeds of the detention of the Dutch naval vessels, East Indiamen, and other merchant vessels that were in port on the outbreak of war between Britain and the Netherlands.

In March 1797 Cockchafer captured Two Friends.

On 20 January 1795, the British government seized the Dutch men of war, East Indiamen, and merchant vessels then in Plymouth. Cockchafer was among the more than 40 Royal Navy vessels that shared in the gratuity awarded for the seizure.

On 4 June 1800 Cockchafer was in Plymouth and firing her guns in a salute to His Majesty's birthday when one of the guns went off while it was being reloaded. (The vent had not been blocked.) Two crew members had their arms damaged and had to be taken to the Naval Hospital where they underwent amputations.

On 20 May 1801 HMS Clyde, Captain Charles Cunningham, and Cockchafer sailed from Plymouth to Jersey where they were to be part of a squadron with Philippe d'Auvergne as commodore. Cockchafer returned to Plymouth and on 13 June.

Loss: On 1 November 1801 Cockchafer was under the command of V. Philpot, variously referred to as her master, or a lieutenant, when she foundered off Guernsey in a gale. All her crew were saved.
