= Hired armed lugger Valiant =

His Majesty's hired armed lugger Valiant served the Royal Navy on a contract from 5 May 1794 to 10 November 1801. She was of 109 90/94 tons (bm), and was armed with eleven 3-pounder guns.

Lieutenant Thomas Baker commanded Valiant from 20 May 1794 until he moved to HMS Fairy in November as her acting-captain. At the time, Valiant served in the Channel as part of the forces under Rear-Admiral John MacBride.

On 8 June 1794 Valiant played a small part in a striking encounter between a frigate squadron under the Guernseyman Captain Sir James Saumarez, and a larger, stronger French squadron. On 6 June, Saumarez received an order from Admiral Macbride to take his frigate, the 36-gun Crescent, the 32-gun frigate Druid, the 24-gun post ship Eurydice, and six cutters and luggers (Valiant and Cockchafer among them), to Guernsey and Jersey, and then to reconnoiter the French coast around Cancale and Saint Malo for signs of the French fleet.

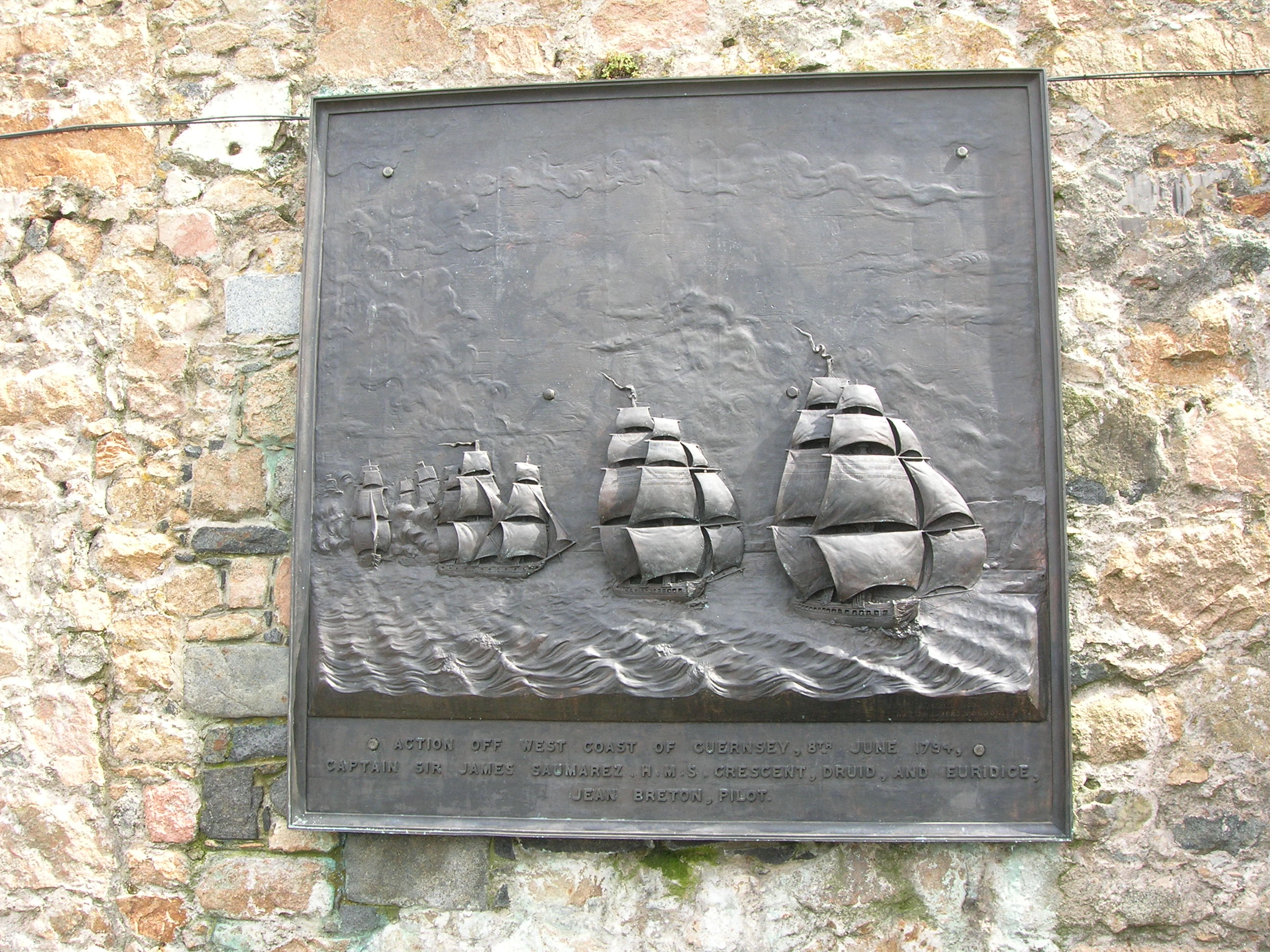
Frieze of HMS Crescent escaping from the French squadron

The squadron sailed on 7 June and on 8 June they were some leagues northwest of Guernsey when Saumarez sighted six sails in the distance. He did not think they were French, but he sent Valiant to investigate. As Valiant approached, the vessels hoisted French colours and fired on her. The French squadron sailed between the cutters and luggers on the one side and the three British ships on the other, so the small vessels fled back to Plymouth.

The French squadron consisted of the two 50-gun French razees - Scévola and Brutus - the two 36-gun frigates Danaé and Félicité, and a 14-gun brig. The French squadron mounted 192 guns firing 5056 pounds of shot; Saumarez's three ships mounted 92 guns firing 1500 pounds of shot.

Saumarez led the French south towards the Hannoways, both sides firing at each other but at such a distance that the fire was pro forma. He sent Eurydice, his slowest ship, ahead, while Crescent and Druid turned towards the Guernsey coast. Saumarez then sent Druid after Eurydice. Both vessels made it around the south coast of Guernsey into Saint Peter Port. Saumarez sailed close to Guernsey's western shore and through some rocks. What made this possible was Saumarez's pilot, Jean Breton, a Guernseyman who knew the waters well. The French gave up the chase, not being willing to risk their vessels in rocky waters they did not know. Tacking back and forth, Crescent sailed around Guernsey's north side and then south to Saint Peter Port. By 14 June Valiant had rejoined Saumarez.

In early 1795, Valiant brought 82 officers and men of the 2nd (The Queen's Royal) Regiment of Foot to Guernsey.

Valiant's next contribution to an action occurred on 20 March 1796, off the Bec du Raz. A squadron under Sir John Borlase Warren in Pomone, and including Artois, Anson and Galatea, engaged a French squadron escorting a convoy. The British captured four brigs from the convoy and Warren instructed Valiant to take them to the nearest port. (The four brigs were Illier, Don de Dieu, Paul Edward, and Félicité.)

The British then engaged the French warships escorting the convoy but were not able to bring them to a full battle before having to give up the chase due to the onset of dark and the dangerous location. Galatea was the only vessel in the British squadron to suffer casualties; she lost two men killed and six wounded. The store-ship Etoile, under the command of lieutenant de vaisseau Mathurin-Théodore Berthelin, struck. She was armed with thirty 12-pounder guns and had a crew of 160 men. The rest of the convoy escaped.

By 22 August 1796, Valiant was in the Mediterranean, carrying dispatches for Admiral John Jervis.

Valiant's greatest success occurred on 5 and 6 December 1799. She was under the command of Lieutenant Arthur Maxwell, and in the company of His Majesty's hired armed schooner Speedwell, which was under the command of Lieutenant Robert Tomlinson. On the 5th, they chased a French lugger privateer for six hours before they finally captured her some five leagues NW of Guernsey. The privateer was Heureuse Esperance, of Saint Malo, armed with fourteen 3-pounder guns, but with a crew of only 24 men, having placed a number of men aboard the four prizes she had captured before Speedwell and Valiant ended her cruise. Heureuse Esperance had thrown eight guns overboard during the chase.

The next day Speedwell and Valiant chased another privateer brig for nine hours (the last hour and ten minutes being a running fight). The British vessels forced the privateer to strike some two miles north of the Swin (sic) Islands. The privateer was Heureux Speculateur, of Granville. She was armed with fourteen 6-pounder guns and had a crew of 58 men under the command of Citizen Louis Joseph Quoniam. She had been cruising for four days but had not taken anything. In the exchange of fire the privateer had had one man killed and seven wounded; there were no British casualties. Tomlinson described Heureux Speculateur as "a remarkably fast Sailer [that] has done a great deal of Mischief to the English Trade."

At some point, probably in 1800, Valiant captured Louisa.

On 18 April 1801, Providence, of Jersey, came into Plymouth. Valiant had recaptured her some ten leagues off The Lizard. A French 14-gun privateer had captured Providence; after recapturing Providence, Valiant had sailed in search of the privateer. Then on 7 June Valiant escorted the East Indiaman Highland Chief and a convoy to the River Thames.
