= Dapdune Wharf =

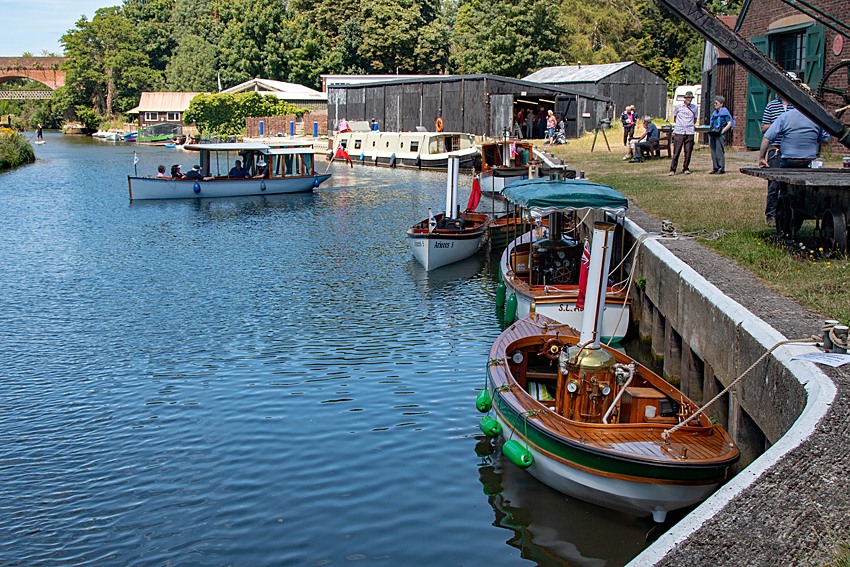
- Steam launches at Dapdune Wharf

- Location within Surrey
- 51°14′35″N 0°34′45″W
- Type: Wharf and boat-builders yard
- Location: Wharf Road, Guildford

Site notes
- Area: Surrey
- Owner: National Trust

Dapdune Wharf is a former industrial wharf and boat yard on the Wey and Godalming Navigations in Guildford, England, UK, close to the Surrey County Cricket Club ground. It is now maintained by the National Trust.

Originally a goods transshipment point, before the construction of the Godalming Navigation the principal cargos were timber from the Surrey forests and gunpowder from the works at Chilworth, as the Guildford authorities refused to let it pass through the town centre for loading at the town wharf. For a period of time at the beginning of the 20th Century, Dapdune Wharf was the centre of barge building on the Wey Navigation.

Dapdune is now the starting point for boat trips, including boat hire. The Visitor Centre has interactive displays, a smithy, a stable, and two of the three remaining Wey barges in the world - the Reliance, permanently damaged and kept in a graving (dry) dock, and Perseverance IV, still floating but in need of repair and the subject of a 2010 National Trust restoration appeal.

Dapdune Wharf is now the head office of the Navigation. As part of the continued preservation of British history the National Trust has a group of volunteers, the Wey Navigation Research Group, researching and publishing information about the Godalming and Wey Navigation.

== Wharf buildings ==
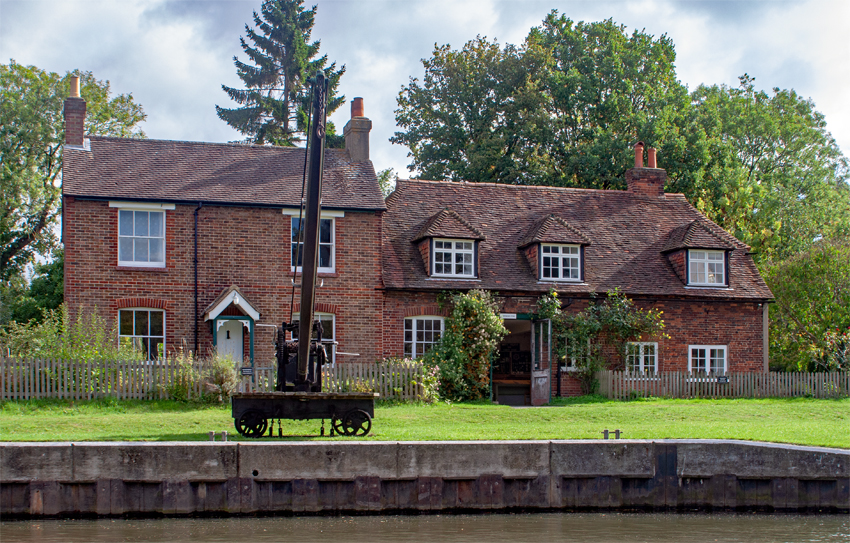
Dapdune Lea and Dapdune Wharf Cottage

Dapdune Wharf comprises a complex of a dozen buildings. Most are concerned with the construction and maintenance of the barges and stores for the various materials needed. They include a smithy, a barge repair shed at the end of a short cut from the bend in the river, a carpenters shed, formerly the sail loft, and the barge building shed at the north end of the site. There was also a graving dock with associated capstans for barges needing repairs below the water line. Two specialist buildings were the steam chest for bending wood to shape for boat ribs, and the tar chest for caulking. There were separate stores for gunpowder, part of the oldest building on the site, and for carbide, which was delivered from London for fuel for lamps. In the late 17th century, the gunpowder wharehouse was used by William Tinkler, manager of the Chilworth gunpowder mills. The gunpowder was delivered to the wharf by cart from the mills for transhipment to barges to be taken to customers in London. A cottage on the wharf, renovated in 1894 for the Edwards family, is a Grade II listed building. The other cottage, Dapdune Lea, was built at the same time for William Stevens III's sister, Mary Jane Stevens. Later their brother, John, added a first floor balcony in order to be able to watch the cricket in comfort. Dapdune Lea is now the National Trust's administrative offices for the navigations.

== Barge building at Dapdune ==
The Wey Navigation opened in 1653. Traffic on the Navigation grew very quickly. In its first year the owners took £800 in tolls on goods carried. This quickly grew to £15,000 per annum. One reason for this growth was the many mills that were built along the Wey plus the slow alternative means of transport. One of the largest remaining mills was built at Coxes Lock, near Addlestone.

In the early days the Navigation was owned by the local landowners and business people. It was Sir Richard Weston of Sutton Place, Guildford who first had the idea of making the Wey navigable. By 1723 the Navigation was in the hands of the Langton family and the Earl of Portmore from Weybridge.

Two families dominated the river and barge building on the Wey, the Stevens and the Edwards.

=== Stevens family ===
Over a period of 150 years the Stevens family played an important role in the development of the Wey Navigation. They started from being humble lock keepers to ownership and management of a substantial transport business along the Navigation and around the Guildford area. Four generations of the family were linked to the Navigation.

- William Stevens (1777–1856)

William was a trained carpenter and moved to the Wey in 1812 to take up the position of lock keeper at Trigg's Lock. In 1820 he and his family moved to Thames Lock. Thames Lock, being the entry and exit to the navigation, meant that William had wider duties than the other lock keepers. One of the duties was to calculate the tolls due from the barge owners. This is probably where William got his first taste of the business side of the Navigation.

- William Stevens II (1810–1890)

Born on the river, William followed his father into the business and it was under him that the family expanded into building and operating their own barges from 1840. William having learnt his trade by working in several yards as an apprentice. The family moved from Thames Lock and lived over the Navigation offices at 3 Friary Street, Guildford. One of their early barges, Perseverance was built at Guildford in 1840, though not at Dapdune. A number of barges carried the name but it was only the last, Perseverance IV, that was built at Dapdune.

- William Stevens III (1844–1936)

It was William III who brought the Edwards family to the Navigation and started to build the Wey barges at Dapdune. William also ran several steam tugs and a towage business on the river Thames. In 1902 the Stevens brothers gained full financial control and ownership of the Navigation.

- Harry W. Stevens (1887–1970)

The last of the family to be involved with the Navigations, Harry bequeathed the Wey Navigation to the National Trust on his retirement in 1964.

=== Edwards family ===
In 1894 William Stevens persuaded Edwin Edwards, a barge builder, to move his family of wife and family (4 sons and several daughters) from the Kennet and Avon Canal to work at Dapdune. The Stevens provided a cottage for Edwin and his family on site. Prior to coming to Guildford, Edwin Edwards had been working for a well established manufacturing firm at Honey Street, Devizes, supplying wooden barges for customers in the South-West of England.

Edwin died in 1904 at the age of 46 and a further five years were to pass before William Stevens III could launch a newly built barge suitable for trade on the Wey Navigation. In October 1909 he launched his new barge Dapdune from the barge building shed at Dapdune. The barge had been built by Edwin's four sons in their spare time. The boys’ main job was maintaining the Navigation, especially the locks. Dapdune remained in service until 1944.

After 1909 the Edwards continued to build barges for the Stevens as a part-time occupation and completed eleven barges over the next thirty years. As well as their duties along the Navigation the Edwards brothers also maintained the barges and carried out any necessary repairs.

== Construction of a Wey barge ==
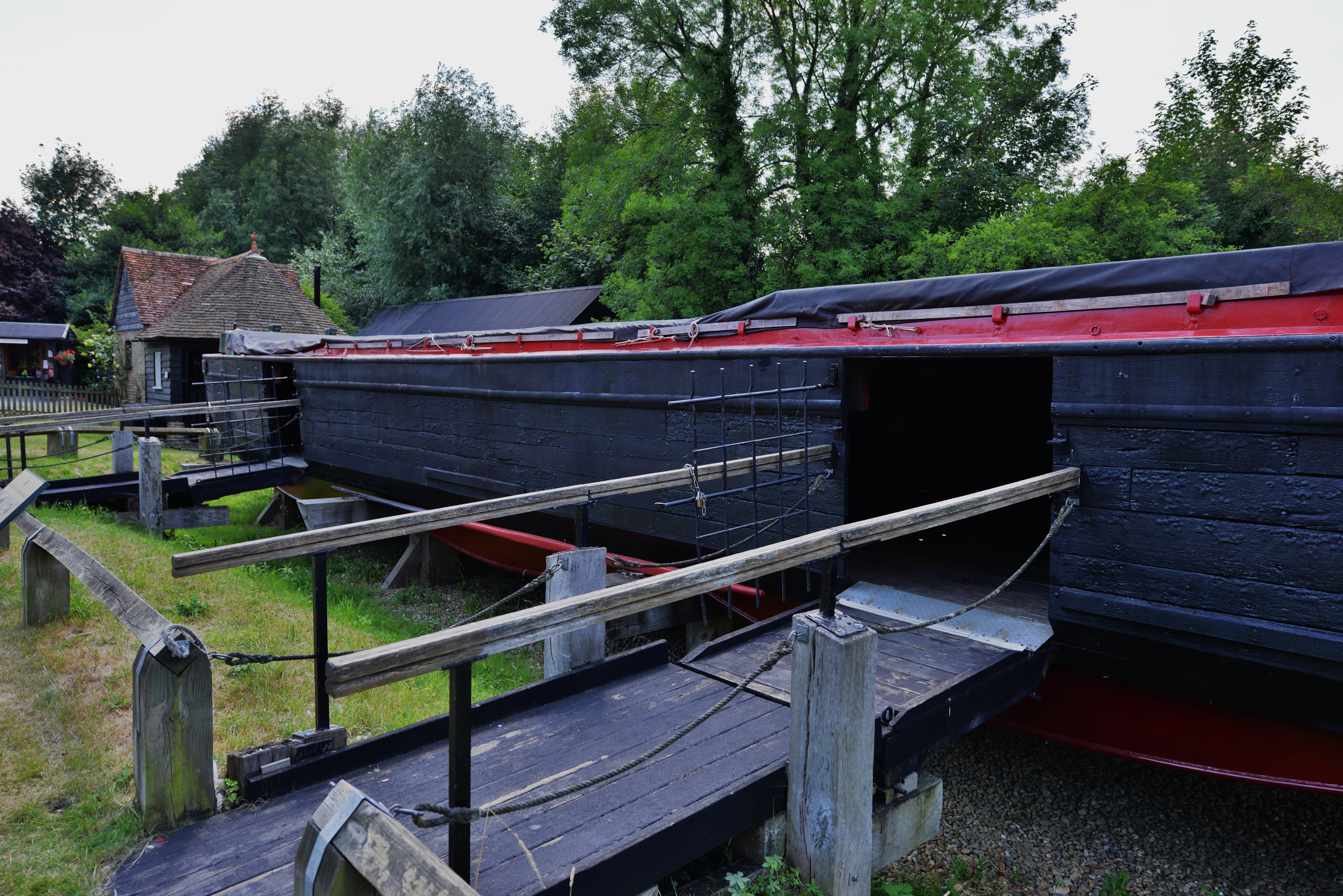
Wey barge Reliance

The Wey barge was built on the earlier western barge designs and the first barges built specifically for use on the Wey were probably built at Honey Street Wharf, Devizes. The earliest that this could be was 1810 as the Kennet and Avon Canal was opened through to the Thames that year.

The ribs of the hull were built from oak. There was a steam chest behind the shed (now the public toilet block) where the wood could be shaped. However the Edwards family preferred to find wood naturally shaped.

The hull was planked with pitch pine. Pitch pine was used because it was lightweight and came in long lengths so required less joints. Elm was tried, and although it was more water resistant, it was heavier and therefore the barge had a lower cargo capacity.

The barge was flat bottomed and straight sided, this meant that it could operate in shallow water with a reasonable cargo. Once the hull was complete it was covered in pitch to create a watertight finish. The barge was built on trestles to keep it off the ground and assist in launching. Only the hull was built in the shed. On completion the water side of the shed was removed and the barge was launched sideways. The barge was then towed up to the area where the pleasure boats are moored today and it was here that fitting out was completed. This was also the area used to repair barges.

The Wey barge was 22.5 metres (74 ft) in length and the width was constrained by the narrowest lock to 4.3 metres (14 ft). A barge would have only centimetres to spare when going through the lock.

A Wey barge could carry 80 tonnes of cargo from the Thames to Coxes mill. From Coxes going upstream the capacity was reduced to 50 tonnes as far as Guildford and further reduced for the journey to Godalming owing to the decrease in the depth of water available.

== Goods carried by the barges ==
A variety of goods were transported along the navigation, for example:

- Wheat grain or barley from Royal Victoria Dock in London to Coxes Mill.
- Gunpowder from Chilworth to Barking or Woolwich
- Wood pulp from London docks to Woking paper mill
- Timber from Guildford to London.

With no engines or sails the barges were towed by horses or people, and occasionally poled or rowed. Once a Wey barge reached the Thames it would be towed by tug boats. The horses were rested in stables along the Navigation. The Navigation owned three stables, at Thames lock, Coxes Mill and Friary Street. The bargemen would pay to use the stables. Local inns along the towpath also provided stabling facilities.

== See also ==
- Canals of the United Kingdom
- History of the British canal system
- Wey barge Perseverance IV
