= Stoke Mill, Guildford =

19th century corn mill in England

Stoke Mill
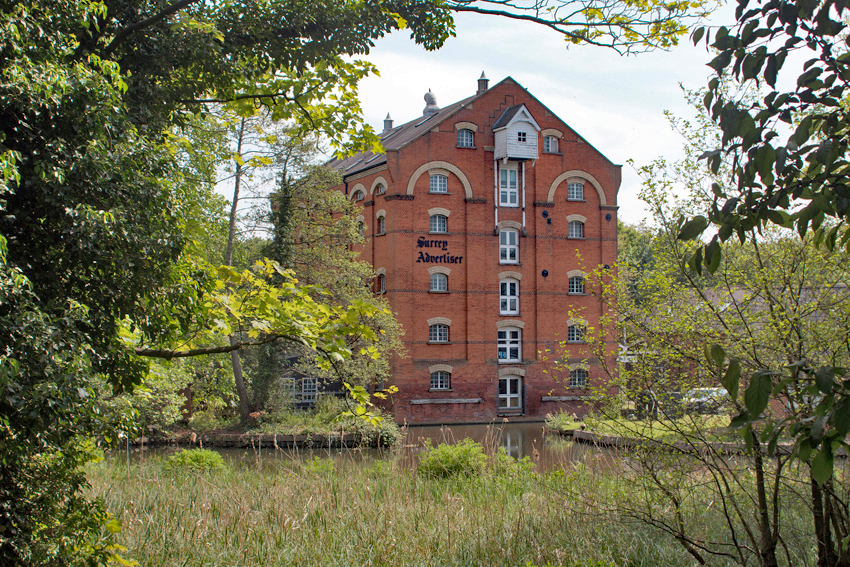

- Location within Surrey
- 51°14′59″N 0°34′15″W
- Type: Watermill
- Location: Guildford, Surrey
- OS grid reference: SU 998 510

History
- Built: 1879

Site notes
- Owner: McMullen and Sons

Stoke Mill is a 19th century corn mill on the River Wey that has been converted into offices. It is situated off the Woking Road just north of Guildford town centre. It forms the centrepiece of a small group of buildings that includes the Grade II listed Stoke Mill House.

== History ==
Domesday lists a mill at Stochae on the King's land. About 1635, Sir Richard Weston built the first paper mill in Surrey here. The building had a ground floor containing the beating engines, surmounted by a tall shuttered drying loft. By 1740 it was also used for grinding corn. This was eventually replaced by a single story mill, with three pairs of stones, after the original was destroyed by fire in 1863. Papermaking ceased in 1869. In 1879 a modern five-story brick built corn mill was constructed alongside and the older mill became a store. In 1894 the new mill was converted to metal rollers to grind the corn and a water turbine had replaced the waterwheel by 1915. The mill ceased working in 1957.

After a period of commercial use as a store and boatyard, the building was converted to offices in 1989, initially for the Crown Prosecution Service, and then occupied by the Surrey Advertiser Group until 2020, when they moved out during the COVID-19 pandemic. In 2025, proposals were put forward to convert it into a pub.

== Millers ==
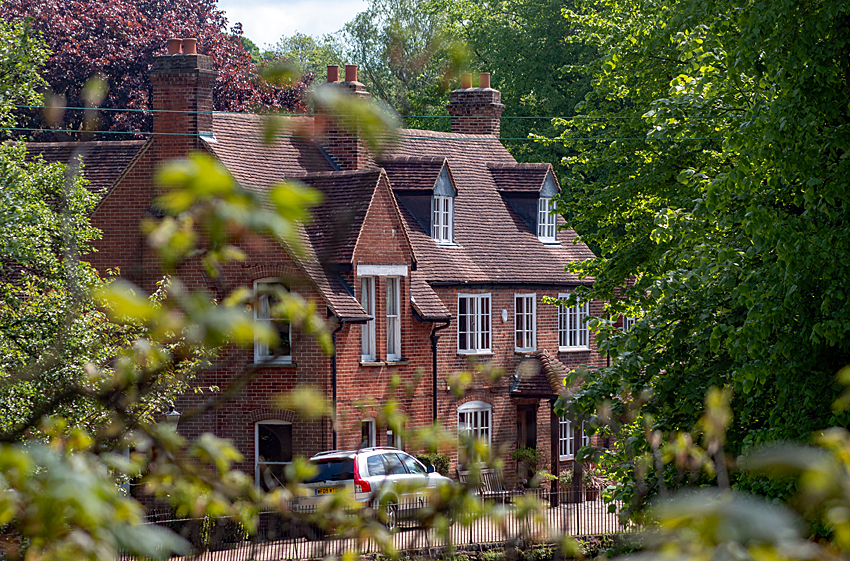
Stoke Mill House

- The first known tenant was John Russel in 1740
- Jasper Franks was tenant in 1842
- John Holden was miller until 1847
- H Saunders held the lease from 1850 to 1855.
- Taken over by Frederick and Henry Bowyer, whose family ran the mill until 1938.

== See also ==
- Mills on the River Wey and its tributaries
- List of watermills in the United Kingdom
