= Coxes Lock =

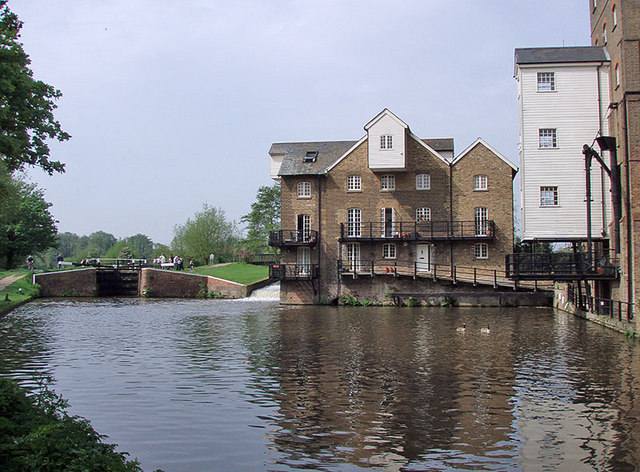
- Coxes Lock and Mill, River Wey, Surrey.
- Interactive map of Coxes Lock
- 51°21′59″N 0°28′37″W
- Waterway: River Wey and Godalming Navigations
- Country: England
- County: Surrey
- First built: 1651
- Latest built: 1770
- Fall: 2.59 m

Coxes Lock is towards the northern end of the Wey Navigation parallel to the River Wey in Addlestone, Surrey,

Most parts of the navigation are canal sections such as this - most only receive flow from the opening of locks, small field ditches and rainfall. However a re-engineered brook (the Old Rive Ditch) alongside the Basingstoke Canal at West Byfleet makes all sections up to a point near Sheerwater Bridge, Woking receive a light minimum flow. The tallest non-ecclesiastical/civic building in South-East England outside London pre-dating about 1880 is the east of the former mill blocks, which are now apartments. A tree-lined towpath and lakeside path run to the lock as does a cul-de-sac for vehicles leading to the apartments. The Mill Pond at Coxes Lock is the largest on the Wey Navigation and helps to control the water depth above an engineered rapid 8 feet 6 inches (2.59 m) millstream cascaded drop, which was originally one drop with a turning waterwheel. In some 19th-century sources, Cox's Lock is recorded.

== History ==
Coxes Lock was built between 1651 and 1653, as part of an important link to transport heavy goods between London and Guildford. The Lock contains a stone inscribed "Built 1770" when improvements were made to the structure and banks. Coxes Lock is the deepest unmanned lock on the Navigation with a rise of 8 feet 6 inches (2.59 m) - and is 1.5 miles (2.4 km) from the Thames.

In 1776 an iron entrepreneur, a Mr Cox, recognised the potential that the site offered and started to build his iron mill which became known as Coxes Lock Mill (pre-dating the adoption of apostrophes in many place names in the English Language).

== Coxes Lock Mill and mill pond ==
The three mill buildings (closely grouped and named Alexander Raby Mill, Daniel Lambert Mill and John Bunn Mill) were a mixture of industrial mill/foundry and accommodation for 207 years. They are now apartments but include a heritage section left untouched. The industrial importance is shown by the closure - on 8 April 1983 - making Coxes Mill the last commercially operated mill in Surrey - a stream-laden county that had in the medieval period more than 6 mills in 1066 and many more in the centuries after acting as a multi-power sources for grain pounding then later also for paper and metal manufacture.

The mill was powered by the waterwheel (drawing its power from the small headwaters locally and large mill pond). The unusually large mill pond was dug to overcome fluctuating water levels caused by the operation of the lock and millstream - it uses a sill at its main downstream entrance to help preserve its level.

Allowing more water down the millstream as the mill expanded became a contentious issue between the mill who favoured this and the commercial barge owners. To avoid grounding most of the year the large mill pond was excavated - but without seeking agreement with the Navigation Commissioners.

In 1808 the lease of the mills was passed from Alexander Raby, an ironmaster from South Wales, to John Bunn who converted it to flour production in the 1830s. Mill owners were well-versed in having to change usage to survive. The mill saw spells of its wheels and linked pulleys used for a silk weaving business for a short period.

Adopting new technology at the end of the 19th century, Coxes was financially strong enough to invest, and unlike many of its contemporaries further upstream went from strength to strength. The mill was rebuilt in 1901 and extended in 1906, becoming one of the most important industrial buildings in the country at the time.

New machinery technology and powerful engines saw the demise of waterpower at the mill when power sources switched at first to steam and lastly to electricity. By the mid 1960s a great wheat silo standing at 137 ft (42 m) had been constructed with a further flour silo erected in 1969. The mill joined with Allied Mills' 21 other mills in the country and by this stage was producing 60 tonnes of flour each day.

== Current adjoining sites ==
Most of the adjoining area is National Trust water and meadows which form a green buffer to London including sharing in most of reduced Surrey's Metropolitan Green Belt status. Shortly after the closure of the mill(s) in 1983 and the ceasing of commercial traffic the navigation was donated to the National Trust. The three mill buildings are listed for heritage or architecture in the starting category, Grade II, and have been converted to residential use. They house well-occupied apartments in a quite deep green-buffered setting inside the M25 motorway close to the fast millstream drop and large mill pond which has many types of fish, dragonfly, mayfly, butterflies and pond skaters. The small complex has a residents-only gym and swimming pool.

== See also ==
- National Trust for Places of Historic Interest or Natural Beauty
- Canals of the United Kingdom
- History of the British canal system
- Mills on the River Wey and its tributaries
