= Perseverance IV =

Wey barge, preserved in Surrey, England

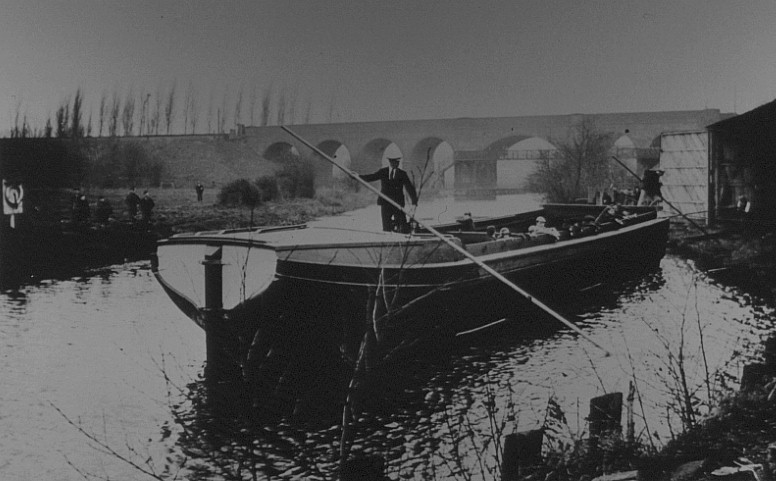
- Perseverance IV immediately after launch in 1937 at Dapdune Wharf, Guildford.

History
- Name: Perseverance IV
- Owner: Wm Stevens & Sons
- Operator: Wm Stevens & Sons
- Route: From Coxes Lock Mill, Weybridge through the Wey and Godalming Navigations and the Thames, to the London Docklands
- Builder: GJV Edwards and Sons, Dapdune Wharf
- Launched: 1934
- Out of service: 1982
- Refit: 1964-6

- Name: Perseverance IV
- Owner: National Trust
- Acquired: 1982
- Refit: 1986–87, 1998
- Home port: Dapdune Wharf

General characteristics
- Type: Wey barge
- Tonnage: 32.25 long tons (32.77 t)
- Length: 74 ft (23 m)
- Beam: 13.66 ft (4.16 m)
- Draught: 4 ft (1.2 m)
- Installed power: Bow-hauled
- Capacity: 80–90 tons

Perseverance IV is a preserved Wey barge, moored at Dapdune Wharf on the River Wey in Surrey, England. She was the final barge to leave that surviving main boatyard on the river. She did so in 1966 and is on the National Register of Historic Ships under registration number 2080, outside of the National Historic Fleet.

== History ==
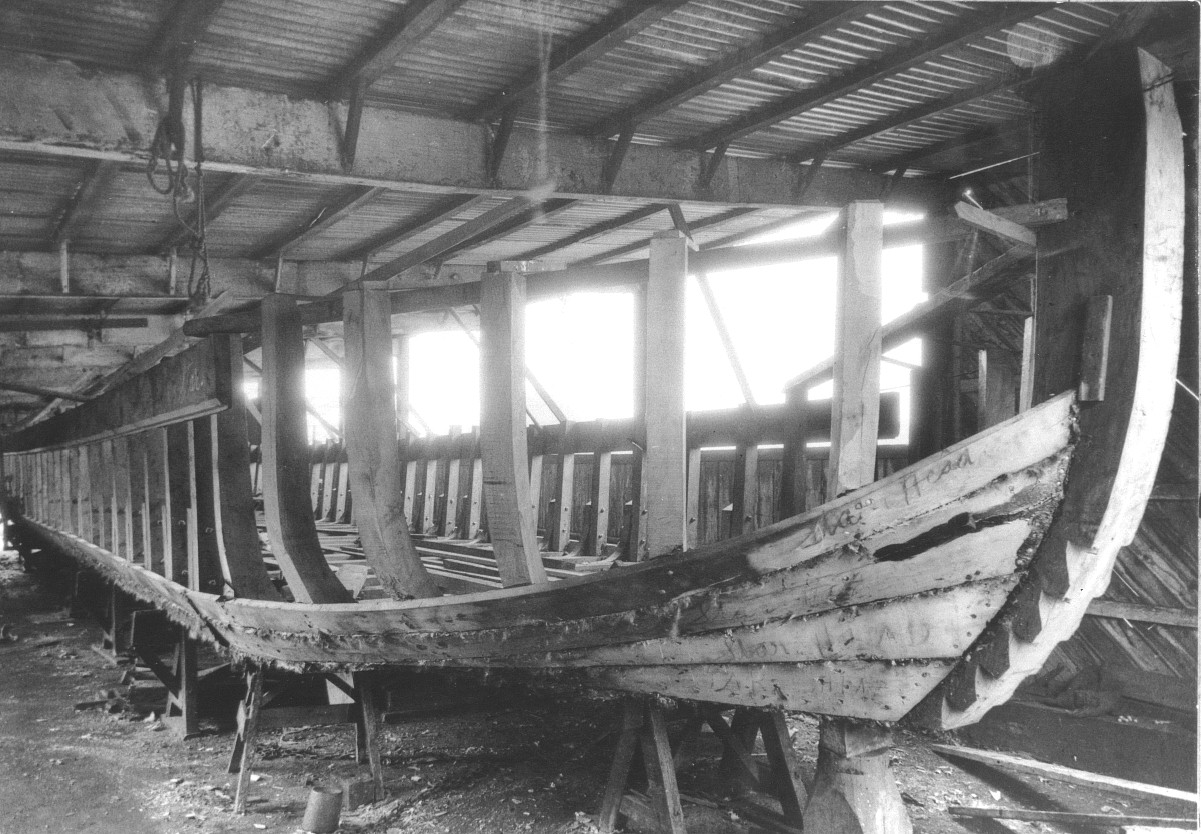
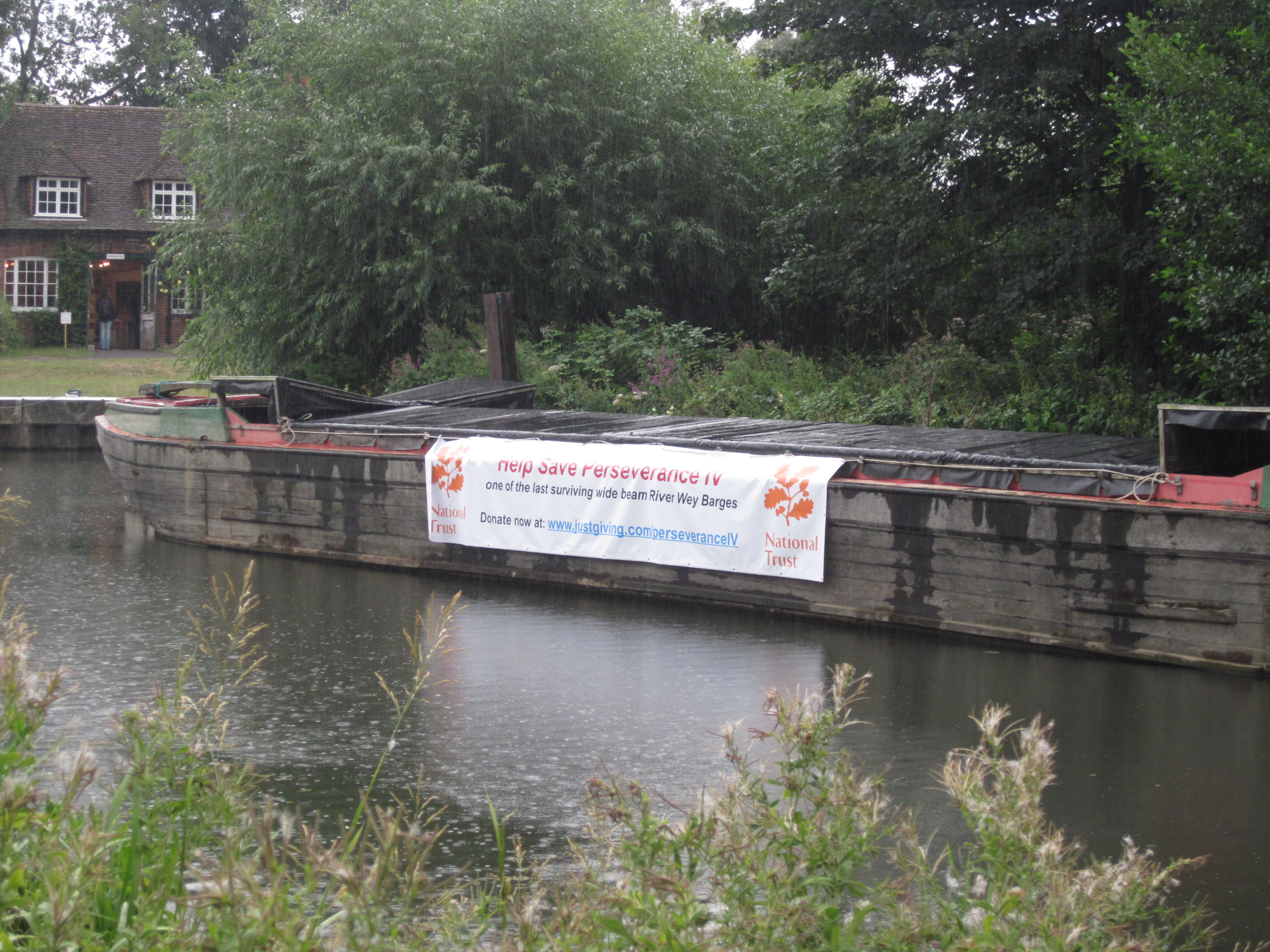
Perseverance IV in 1934 (left) and 2010 (right) at Dapdune Wharf.

Perseverance IV was built in 1934 by G J V Edwards and Sons at Dapdune Wharf, Guildford – the tenth of eleven Wey barges made by the company. The barge was built for the then owners of the Wey Navigation, William Stevens & Sons, and carried bulk wheat between the London Docklands and Coxes Lock Mill, Addlestone. After more than thirty years working the route, she was rebuilt at Dapdune Wharf from 1964 to 1966. She then went back into service, before being sold to another owner who used her as a cable-laying barge on the Regents Canal, where she ended her working life in 1982.

In 1982, she came under the ownership of the Museum of London, and was rebuilt further times: in 1986/87 and 1998.

She is one of only three remaining Wey barges in the world, and is the only floating example – the Reliance is permanently damaged and in a drydock at Dapdune Wharf, whereas Speedwell is in poor condition at the National Waterways Museum in Ellesmere Port.

In future, the National Trust hope to use the barge for public boat trips up and down the Navigations. Unfortunately, due to a lack of annual maintenance, she needs repair, and costs £10,000 per year to maintain. Consequently, the National Trust launched a 2011 appeal to raise £200,000 for the purchase and £300,000 for years of restoration.

== See also ==
- Barges of the Wey Navigation
