= Surrey Advertiser =

Newspaper in Surrey, England, United Kingdom

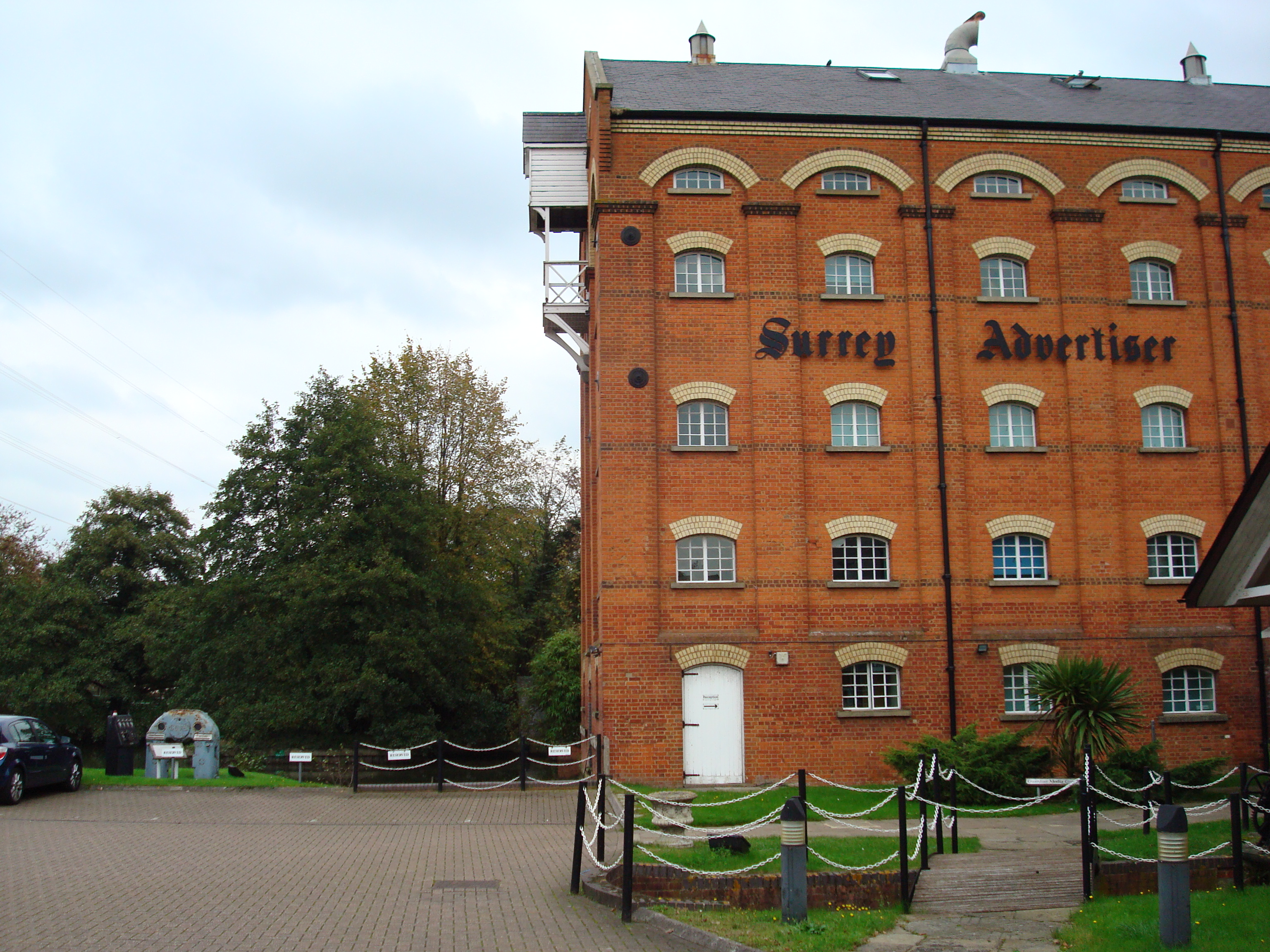
- The Surrey Advertiser offices in Guildford
- Owner: Reach plc
- Founded: 1864
- Circulation: 2,692 (as of 2023)
- Website: getsurrey.co.uk

The Surrey Advertiser is a newspaper for Surrey, England which was established in 1864 and gradually evolved into the Surrey Advertiser Group of seven more localised titles. Guardian Media Group sold the Group to Trinity Mirror in 2010. The owners are now known as Reach plc. The head office is in Stoke Mill, Guildford.

In March 2009 the News and Mail Series ended in the light of the more recent parallel titles within the same group which covered the same areas, principally the Surrey Herald: (various locality editions) and Guardian series. These three current titles, altogether, have the highest local paper circulation in Surrey. The series has moved universally to colour format. The Group is collectively branded also as the Get Surrey group, particularly its web presence.

Its history is one of multiple acquisitions to expand its territory. The largest single expansion was in 2009 when GMG bought the Esher News & Mail Group another broadsheet weekly newspaper first published in 1936. This added five editions, covering towns in the Elmbridge borough of Surrey.

== Newspapers ==
=== Surrey Advertiser ===
The primary newspaper is the weekly Surrey Advertiser itself with seven regional versions (Guildford, Cranleigh, Godalming, Woking, Elmbridge, Leatherhead, and Dorking). The group also produces other, more local, series including the Aldershot News & Mail series. The Surrey Advertiser and the Woking News & Mail were acquired by Surrey and Berkshire Media, a branch of the Guardian Media Group. However, The Surrey Advertiser and associated papers were sold to Trinity Mirror in April while the latter title and the Review series are the only regional paper that remain with the Guardian Media Group.

=== Surrey Herald ===
The more localised series covers the less rurally buffered north of the county and its titles are:

- Surrey Herald:
  - Walton and Weybridge edition
  - Sunbury and Shepperton edition
  - Staines, Ashford & Egham edition
  - Chertsey & Addlestone edition

=== Surrey Times Series ===
Surrey Times currently refers to three newspapers: the Guildford Times, Godalming Times, and the Cranleigh Times. The papers, established in 1855 and now published and printed by Surrey & Berkshire Media Ltd, are distributed free to local residents, with a verified free distribution over thirty-two thousand copies.

== Operational aspects ==
=== Website ===
In 2008 the Surrey Advertiser group of Trinity Mirror Group launched its website: Get Surrey which is also used to describe the Group succinctly and its jobs site: GetTheJob.

In 2018 the online website was rebranded to Surrey Live while still retaining the original domain name.

=== Awards ===
In October 2009 the Surrey Advertiser won two awards at the EDF Energy London and the South of England Media Awards 2009.

The Surrey Advertiser was joint winner of the Community Campaign of the Year award, alongside the Gravesend and Dartford Messenger.

At just under 17 months old, Get Surrey won its award at the first time of asking, the judges remarking that the website “turned a weekly into a daily”.

== History ==
=== Former News and Mail Series ===
The Esher News & Mail was a broadsheet weekly newspaper first published in 1936.

It grew beyond its initial parochial catchment into five editions for towns in the Elmbridge borough of Surrey, England.

The editions were:

- Esher News & Mail
- Walton and Hersham News & Mail
- Cobham News & Mail
- Molesey News & Mail
- Weybridge News & Mail

It was part of the Surrey Advertiser Group, owned by the Guardian Media Group

In March 2009 its closure was announced as part of the restructuring plans of the owning group who opened parallel titles which cover the same areas, principally instead its Surrey Herald: (various locality editions) and Guardian series. The relevant replacements have moved to colour, tabloid format.
