= Hired armed lugger Speedwell =

His Majesty's Hired armed lugger Speedwell served the Royal Navy on contract between 11 June 1796 and 31 October 1801. She had a burthen of 15215/94 tons (bm), and was armed with fourteen 4-pounder guns.

On 28 May 1797, Phaeton, Melpomene, and Speedwell detained Frederickstadt.

At some point, Speedwell, under the command of Lieutenant Robert Tomlinson, recaptured St Patrick, Harford, master.

Tomlinson and Speedwell captured another French privateer on 10 October. Speedwell was about nine leagues south of The Start when she encountered a small French cutter. A chase ensued and after six hours Speedwell captured Les Amis, armed with two brass 6-pounder guns and two swivels, and manned by 18 men. Les Amis was four days out of Granville and had not taken anything. Les Amis was very small, with a burthen of 12 tons (bm).

Three days later, Speedwell captured another French privateer in the same area, after a five hour chase. The privateer was Telemachus, of six brass 6-pounder guns and six swivels, with a crew of 35 men. (Note: Télémaque was a privateer commissioned in Granville in 1797 under Thomas Yon.) Tomlinson put a prize crew aboard her and sent her into Plymouth. Télémaque was a little larger with a burthen of 39 tons (bm).

A Speedwell, either the hired lugger or the cutter HMS Speedwell, next appears as a participant in the Anglo-Russian invasion of Holland (27 August – 19 November 1799). On 24 September Admiral Andrew Mitchell reported that he detached Captain Boorder, in Espeigle, with Speedwell, to scour the Coast from Steveren to Lemmer.

Subsequently, both Speedwells were among the vessels that shared in the proceeds of the Vlieter Incident on 28 August 1799, when the Dutch fleet, with 632 guns and 3700 men, surrendered to Admiral Mitchell, without a shot being fired.

December 1799 gave Speedwell her last two captures. Speedwell was in company with the hired lugger Valiant, under the command of Lieutenant Arthur Maxwell. On the 5th, they chased a French lugger privateer for six hours before they finally captured her some five leagues NW of Guernsey. The privateer was Heureuse Esperance, of Saint Malo, armed with fourteen 3-pounder guns, but with a crew of only 24 men, having placed a number of men aboard the four prizes she had captured before Speedwell and Valiant ended her cruise. Heureuse Esperance had thrown eight guns overboard during the chase. Heureuse Espereance was a small vessel with a burthen of 49 tons (bm).

The next day, Speedwell and Valiant chased another privateer brig for nine hours (the last hour and ten minutes being a running fight). The British vessels forced the privateer to strike some two miles north of the Swin (sic) Islands. The privateer was Heureux Speculateur, of Granville. She was armed with fourteen 6-pounder guns and had a crew of 58 men under the command of Citizen Louis Joseph Quoniam. She had been cruising for four days but had not taken anything. In the exchange of fire the privateer had had one man killed and seven wounded; there were no British casualties. Tomlinson described Heureux Speculateur as "a remarkably fast Sailer [that] has done a great deal of Mischief to the English Trade."

In early April 1800, "the Speedwell Cutter" brought into Yarmouth Fancy de Jersey, which she had recaptured off Goree. Fancy had been sailing from Guernsey to Leith when a French privateer lugger captured her.

In mid-December, "the Speedwell Cutter" towed Recovery into Falmouth. Recovery had no one on board when Speedwell found her at sea. Recovery, Paine, master, had been sailing from Emsworth to Waterford when a French privateer had plundered her.

On 31 December, Speedwell sailed for the Straits of Gibraltar with despatches. In the Gut of Gibraltar Speedwell encountered Spanish gunboats on 10 February. He was able to repel them though the engagement left Speedwell "much shattered", and with two men wounded.

Speedwell arrived back in Britain, at Plymouth, on 23 April, from Rhodes. Tomlinson landed with his despatches at Mount's Bay and took them to London overland. On the way back from Rhodes Speedwell had stopped at Mahón. There she took on board as a passenger Lieutenant Robert Jump, who had been commander of HMS Sprightly until 10 February when she encountered a French squadron under the command of Admiral Ganteume Ganteaume, which captured her. (Jump underwent a court martial on 10 May aboard HMS Gladiator for the loss of his vessel and was acquitted.) On 29 April Speedwell landed 10,000 letters from Egypt, Malta, and Mahon, after the Officers of Health had properly fumigated them.

== Notes, citations, and references ==
Notes

Citations

References

- Crowhurst, Patrick (1989). The French War on Trade: Privateering 1793-1815. Scholar Press. ISBN 0 85967 8040.
- Demerliac, Alain (1999). La Marine de la Révolution: Nomenclature des Navires Français de 1792 A 1799 (in French). Éditions Ancre. ISBN 2-906381-24-1.
- Winfield, Rif (2008). British Warships in the Age of Sail 1793–1817: Design, Construction, Careers and Fates. Seaforth Publishing. ISBN 978-1-86176-246-7.
