= HMS Speedwell (1780) =

Brig of the Royal Navy

History

Great Britain
- Name: HMS Speedwell
- Acquired: May 1780 by purchase
- Fate: Foundered 1807

General characteristics
- Tons burthen: 19343/94 bm
- Length: 75 ft 3 in (22.9 m) (overall); 54 ft 6 in (16.6 m)
- Beam: 25 ft 10 in (7.9 m)
- Depth of hold: 10 ft 2 in (3.1 m)
- Propulsion: Sails
- Sail plan: Cutter; Brig (post-1796)
- Complement: 70
- Armament: 14 × 4-pounder guns (later 16) + 10 × ½-pound swivel guns

HMS Speedwell was a mercantile vessel that the Admiralty purchased in 1780. During the American Revolutionary War she served at Gibraltar during the Great Siege. In 1796 she was converted to a brig. Although she did capture two French privateers and participate in an incident in which the Royal Navy violated Swedish neutrality, her service in the French Revolutionary and Napoleonic Wars was apparently relatively uneventful. A storm in February 1807 destroyed her, causing the loss of her entire crew.

== American Revolutionary War ==
Lieutenant John Gibson commissioned Speedwell in July 1780, for the Mediterranean. She arrived at Gibraltar, which was undergoing the Great Siege, on 20 December, carrying dispatches. While Speedwell was on her way she encountered a small vessel that launched an attack that Speedwell repulsed, though Gibson sustained some wounds. On 1 January 1781 the British took possession of an abandoned settee on which there were letters, with one mentioning that the vessel that had attacked Speedwell had suffered several men killed and wounded.

Speedwell then remained at Gibraltar. Five men deserted Speedwell on 11 April after helping tow the cutter Tartar out of the Mole. On 16 June 1781 Speedwell brought 120 prisoners into Gibraltar, but it is not clear from where. On 5 October some of Speedwell's crew intended a mutiny to seize her and desert with her to the Spanish. However, a Spanish boy, a deserter, who was on board informed Gibson, who arrested four ringleaders. The deserters were then placed in irons on the provost ship. About half the crew were amenable to the planned mutiny, which had the mutineers rising, killing the officers, and then sailing Speedwell to Algerciras. There the mutineers intended to sell her, split the proceeds, and proceed individually to England.

On 3 December a crewman from Speedwell stole a fishing boat and made for the Spanish shore before some fishermen set out after him and brought him back.

Speedwell was re-rated as a sloop-of-war on 22 March 1782, with the news reaching Gibraltar on 22 May. On 16–17 September Speedwell prepared to go to sea.

In June 1782 the garrison launched 12 gunboats. Each was armed with an 18-pounder gun, and received a crew of 21 men drawn from Royal Navy vessels stationed at Gibraltar. Speedwell provided the crew for Vengeance.

On 11 July four men deserted, two of them from Speedwell, and participants in the planned mutiny.

During the siege, Speedwell provided men for the Marine Brigade formed on 9 September 1782. Messrs Malone, Devereux, and Park served as captain and ensigns in the brigade, respectively.

Around 11 October, a storm came up and drove the Spanish two-decker San Miguel close to Gibraltar, apparently in some distress. The batteries fired on her, killing two men and wounding two others. She shortly thereafter grounded, and struck. A boat from Speedwell went out to establish possession. San Miguel, of 72 guns, had a complement of 634 men under the command of Don Juan Moreno. She was a new vessel, built at Havana.

Earlier, on 13 and 14 September, the garrison destroyed a number of floating batteries. In December 1784 there was a distribution of £30,000 in bounty money for the batteries and the proceeds of the sale of ships' stores, including those of San Miguel. A second payment of £16,000 followed in November 1785. A third payment, this of £8,000, followed in August 1786. June 1788 saw the payment of a fourth tranche, this of £4,000. Speedwell's officers and crew shared in all four.

Commander William Bradshaw was appointed to command Speedwell in January 1783.

It is not clear from where Speedwell came, nor when, but on 19 March 1783 she anchored in Rosia Bay. Three days later she and Porcupine sailed for Barbary. She returned, and on 27 May set out from Gibraltar to attempt to sail west. On 6 June Speedwell and Brilliant sailed for Tangier. On 9 August Speedwell departed. She arrived at Portsmouth on 5 September.

== Post-war ==
Speedwell was paid off in August 1783. Then on 14 October she reverted to the status of a cutter. She underwent fitting at Portsmouth, and in November Lieutenant Richard Willis recommissioned her for service off the Isle of Arran. In July 1787 she was paid-off.

Lieutenant Thomas Rayment recommissioned Speedwell in June 1789. In August, King George, with Queen Charlotte and the three princesses, visited Plymouth Dockyard and inspected the Navy there. He took the opportunity to promote a number of officers, Rayment among them.

In October Lieutenant George Brissac recommissioned Speedwell for the Channel. In May 1790 Speedwell was again recommissioned this time under Lieutenant George Paris Monke. Speedwell performed various missions for Admiral Lord Howe. Then in 1782, she was off the Yorkshire coast when she captured a smuggling brig. At 14 guns, the Hell-Afloat was probably as strongly armed as Speedwell, but did not resist capture.

Shortly before the start of the war with France, Monke sailed Speedwell to Hamburg to retrieve some British sailors rescued from various vessels that had wrecked on the coast of Jutland. He brought back about 100. Monke was forced to stay on deck day and night, although on the way back to Britain the weather was bad, to forestall any uprising by the rescued sailors. The fear was that the sailors, who were not anxious to be pressed into the Royal Navy, would try to seize Speedwell and run her ashore.

== French Revolutionary Wars ==
The voyage from Hamburg so hurt Monke's health that he resigned his appointment in September. Lieutenant Edward Williams replaced Monke.

During the night of 22–23 August 1796, the French privateer cutter Brave approached Speedwell off St Catherine's Point on the Isle of Wight and attempted to board her. Speedwell captured Brave, which was armed with one 6-pounder guns and two swivel guns, and had a crew of 25 men. (Note: Demerliac describes as being armed with three guns and having a complement of 35 men.) Brave was only 12 hours out of Cherbourg and had not yet captured anything. Speedwell carried Brave into Spithead.

Between October 1796 and April 1797 the Navy had her altered at Portsmouth to a brig. In March Williams received a promotion to Commander; the next month Lieutenant William Birchall recommissioned Speedwell.

Lieutenant James Reddy replaced Birchall in September 1798, sailing Speedwell for the North Sea. At some point in 1798 the Royal Navy re-rated her as a gun-brig.

On 7 August 1798 Busy and Speedwell intercepted in the North Sea a Swedish convoy under the escort of HSwMS Ulla Fersen. The British vessels demanded that the Swedes come into port to have their cargo inspected for enemy (French) cargo. Although Sweden was neutral, Ulla Fersen's captain acceded to this demand as the two British vessels out-gunned him and he wanted to avoid loss of life. The Swedish merchant vessels were inspected, one was seized, and the rest departed.

Speedwell next appears as a participant in the Anglo-Russian invasion of Holland (27 August 1799 – 19 November 1790). On 24 September Admiral Andrew Mitchell reported that he detached Captain Boorder, in Espeigle, with Speedwell, to scour the Coast from Steveren to Lemmer. Captain William Bolton of Wolverine praised Reddy, whom Bolton sent in a flat boat to retrieve the gun-brig Piercer, which had grounded around end-September.

Subsequently, Speedwell (and also the hired armed lugger Speedwell, were among the vessels that shared in the proceeds of the Vlieter Incident on 28 August 1799, when the Dutch fleet, with 632 guns and 3700 men, surrendered to Admiral Mitchell, without a shot being fired.

In early April 1800 "the Speedwell Cutter" brought into Yarmouth Fancy de Jersey, which she had recaptured off Goree. Fancy had been sailing from Guernsey to Leith when a French privateer lugger captured her.

Next, Speedwell shared with Constance and Netley in the capture on 23 June 1801 of Purissima Concepcion.

Speedwell was paid off in July 1802.

== Napoleonic Wars ==
Between July and August 1803 Speedwell underwent refitting at Sheerness. Lieutenant Donald Fernandez recommissioned her in August. (Note: Fernandez was of a Sephardic Jewish family. Because of the Test Acts, he had to renounce his religion in order to join the Royal Navy. His service on Speedwell was his only command.) By January 1804 Lieutenant William Robertson had replaced Fernandez.

On 15 January 1804, Speedwell, under Robertson's command, was sailing from Guernsey to Dungeness. Speedwell was escorting transports carrying troops of the 43rd Regiment of Foot. She was about five leagues from Beachy Head when she encountered the French privateer lugger Hazard. Hazard, of Boulogne, was under the command of Pierre François Beauvois. She was armed with six guns, but had thrown two overboard during the four-hour chase before she struck. She had a crew of 34 men and had sailed three days earlier from Dieppe. The day before she had captured the sloop Jane, which had been carrying merchandise from Southampton to London. (Note: Demerliac conflates this Hazard with the Hasard that HMS Echo captured in 1805.)

== Fate ==
On 18 February 1807 Robertson was still her captain when a storm drove Speedwell onto the shore near Dieppe. There were no survivors.
