= Speedwell =

Speedwell may refer to:

== Plants ==
- Speedwell, several plants in the genus Veronica

== Places ==
=== Australia ===
- Speedwell, Queensland, a locality in the South Burnett Region, Queensland

=== United Kingdom ===
- Speedwell, Bristol, England
- Speedwell Castle, Staffordshire, England
- Speedwell Cavern, Derbyshire, England, a former 18th Century lead mine
- Speedwell Mill, 18th century mill in Wirksworth, Derbyshire
- Speedwell Farm, Woburn, Bedfordshire, designed in 1795 by Robert Salmon
- Speedwell Hill, Cheshire, former site of the Bluecap Memorial

=== United States ===
- Speedwell, Kentucky, an unincorporated community
- Speedwell, New Jersey, an unincorporated community
- Speedwell, Tennessee, an unincorporated community
- Speedwell, Virginia, an unincorporated community
- Speedwell Township, St. Clair County, Missouri, an inactive township

=== Falkland Islands ===
- Speedwell Island in Falkland Sound

=== Australia ===
- Speedwell in the vicinity of Hivesville, Queensland

== Manufacturing and vehicles ==
- Speedwell Forge, Lancaster County, Pennsylvania
- Speedwell Ironworks, and Speedwell Village, Morristown, New Jersey
- Troublesome Creek Ironworks, from 1771, North Carolina, originally called Speedwell Furnace
- Speedwell Motor Car Company, an early car manufacturer
- Speedwell GT version of the Austin-Healey Sebring Sprite sports car
- Speedwell bicycles, made in Sydney, Australia, from 1882
- Speedwellbus, a former bus company in Manchester, England

== Ships ==
- Speedwell (ship) lists ships with the name Speedwell including:
  - Speedwell (1577 ship) transported Pilgrims with Mayflower

== Fictional characters ==
- Speedwell, a rabbit character in the Watership Down novel
- Mrs Speedwell, a character in Tit for Tat (1921 film)
- Speedwell, a character in Death Comes to Time, a Doctor Who-based audio drama
- Mrs Speedwell, a character in The Glorious Dead (Upstairs, Downstairs)

== Music ==
- "Speedwell" song on the album You Need a Mess of Help to Stand Alone by Saint Etienne
- Dan B. Speedwell, musician on the album Liberty Belle and the Black Diamond Express by The Go-Betweens

== Other uses ==
- Speedwell Weather Limited, a company making Weather derivative software
- "Speedwell" whistle, by Henry Arthur Ward
- Speedwell, an 18th-century Thoroughbred racehorse, winner of the 1894 Middle Park Stakes

== See also ==
- Operation Speedwell, a World War II British raid into Italy
