= Richard Weston (canal builder) =

English canal builder and agricultural improver

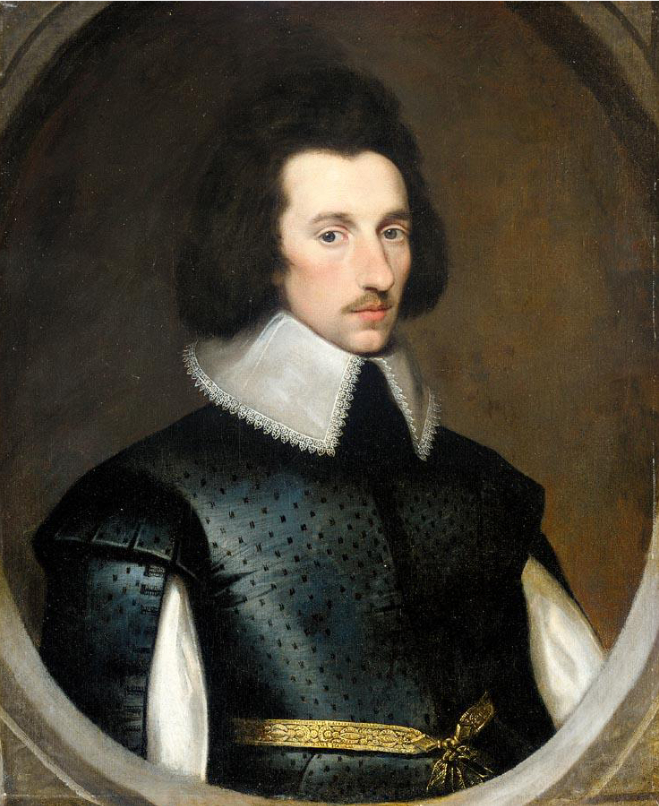
Portrait of Sir Richard Weston, attributed to Cornelis de Neve, c. 1630

Sir Richard Weston (1591–1652) was an English canal builder and agricultural improver. He instigated the construction of the Wey Navigation—one of the first man-made navigations in Britain—and introduced new plants and systems of crop rotation.

== Biography ==
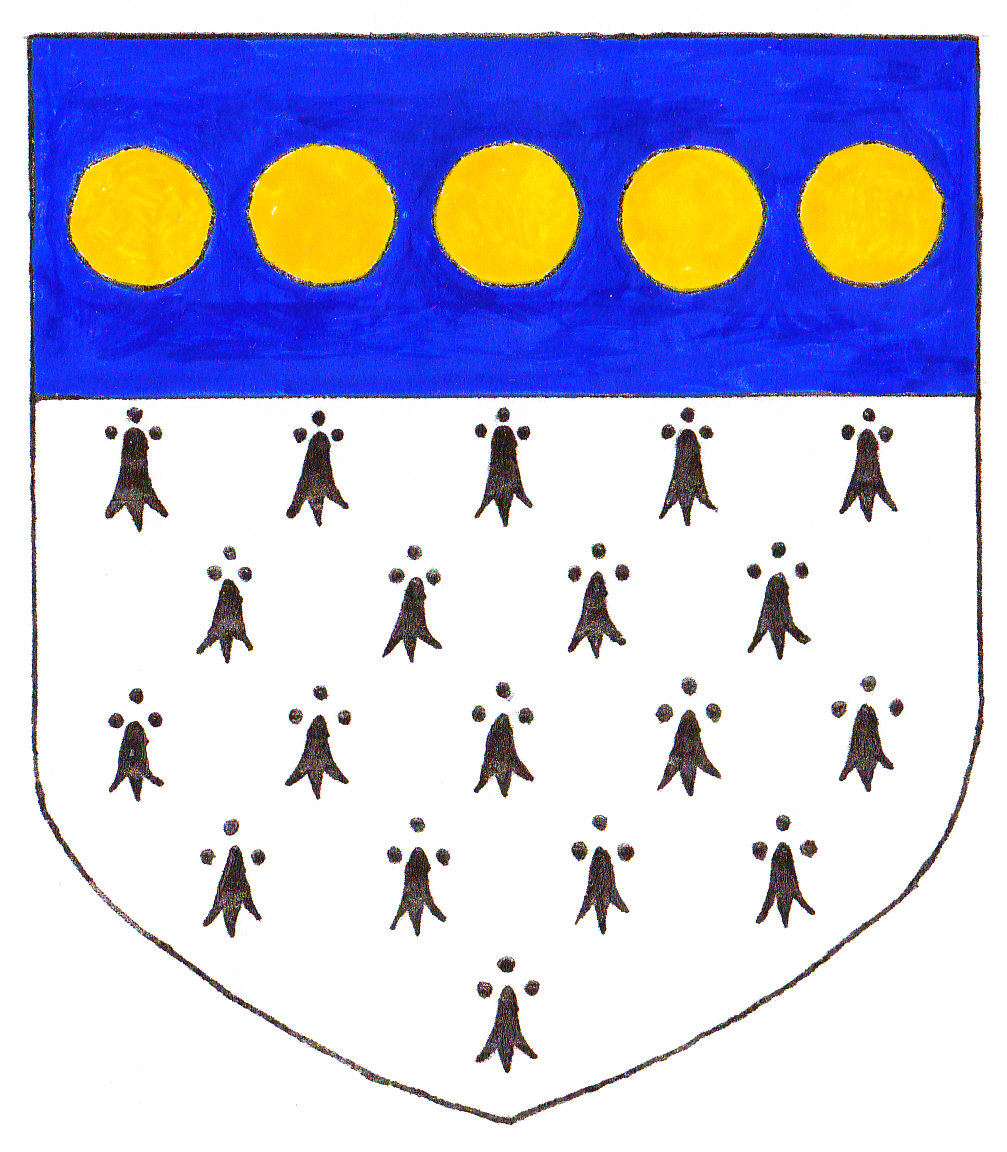
Arms of Weston: Ermine, on a chief azure 5 bezants

Weston was born in 1591, the eldest son of Sir Richard Weston (1564-1613) of Sutton Place, Surrey, by Jane Dister (d.1625), daughter of John Dister of Bergholt, Essex. He was the great-great-grandson of Sir Richard Weston (1465-1541), builder of Sutton Place.

He was educated, or spent part of his early life, in Flanders. In 1613, he succeeded to the family estates at Sutton and Clandon and was knighted on 27 July 1622 at Guildford.

Sir Richard Weston was ambassador from England to Frederic the fifth, Elector Palatine, and King of Bohemia, in 1619. He was present at the famous battle of Prague in 1620.

In the early 1630s, Weston decided to copy the canal and lock system prevalent in The Netherlands to make the River Wey navigable between Weybridge and Guildford. He was appointed one of the Royal Commissioners to oversee the work in 1635. During the English Civil War (1642–1651), his property was sequestrated and he went into exile.

In 1644, he visited Ghent, Bruges and Antwerp and studied agricultural methods in use there. By 1649 he was back in England and instigated a bill in parliament to authorise the construction of the navigation which became an Act of Parliament in 1651. Weston immediately set to work on construction, although he died before the scheme reached completion.

One of his first agricultural schemes was to increase the hay yield, by introducing a new strain of hay and by irrigation schemes. He also introduced from Flanders a crop rotation scheme based on clover, flax and turnips. In 1645 he had written an account of Flemish husbandry which formed the basis of the "Discours" published in various versions in 1651 and 1652.

Weston died aged 61 and was buried at Trinity Chapel Guildford. He married Grace Harper of Cheshunt and by her had seven sons and two daughters.

== Work ==
=== Canal building ===
Sir Richard Weston was the first to introduce, at any rate into the Surrey district, the system, long prevalent in Holland, of rendering rivers and canals navigable by means of locks. He attempted by this means to make the River Wey navigable from Guildford to its junction with the Thames at Weybridge. In 1635 he was appointed one of the royal commissioners for the prosecution of the work. It was perhaps the expenditure necessitated by his canal scheme which forced him in 1641 to sell Temple Court Farm at Merrow, with the mansion at West Clandon, to Sir Richard Onslow, MP for Surrey in the Long Parliament.

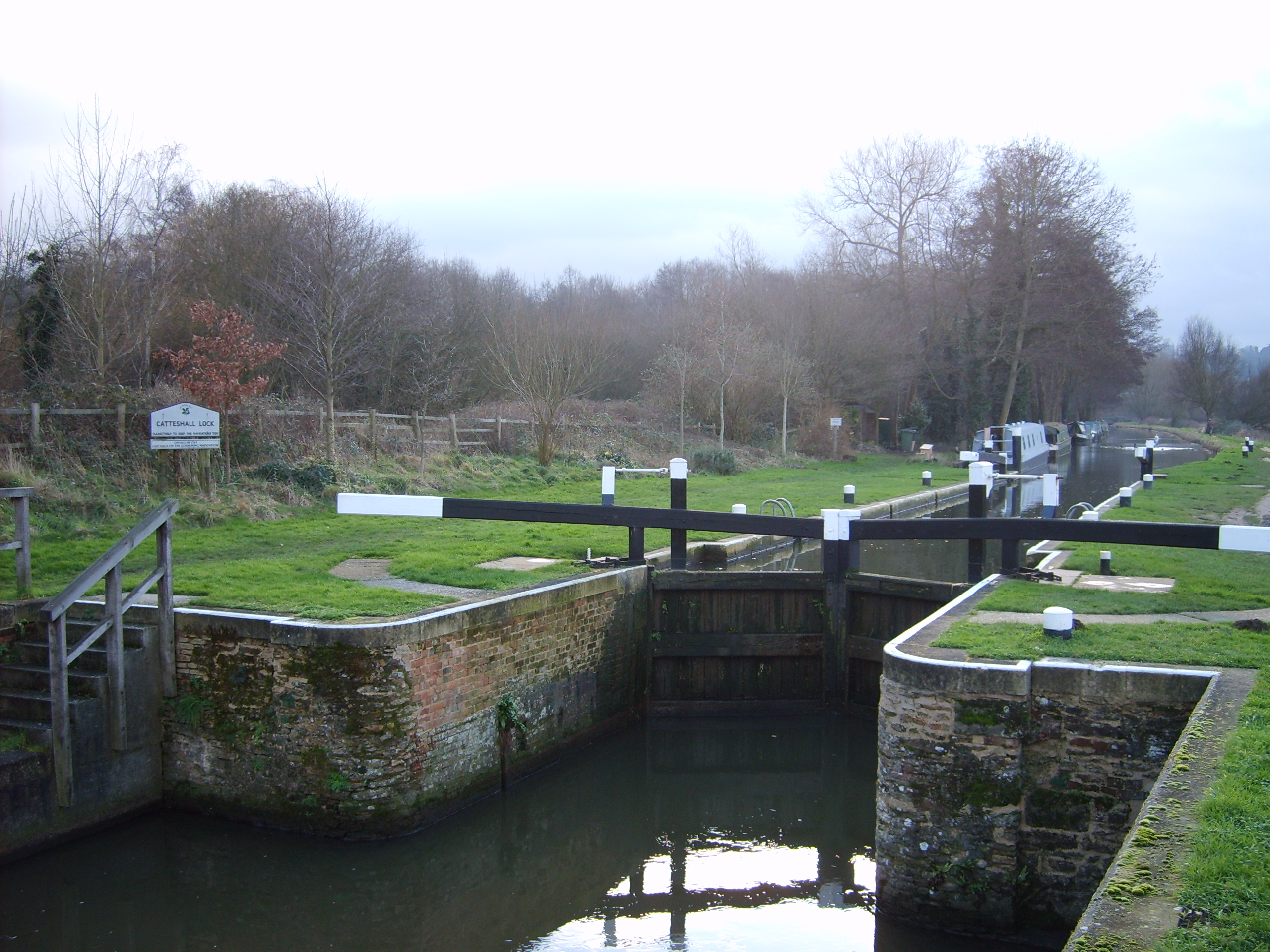
Catteshall Lock, opened in 1764 to complete a Godalming extension to the River Wey Navigation of 1653.

In 1649 Weston entered into an agreement with Major James Pitson, commissioner for Surrey under the parliament, that the latter should solicit the discharge of his sequestration and forward his schemes for rendering the Wey navigable. Accordingly, a petition was presented in the name of Pitson and the corporation of Guildford. A bill authorising the works was brought into the House of Commons on 26 December 1650, and passed as an act on 26 June 1651. The capital was £6,000, of which Sir Richard was to find half, undertaking at the same time to complete the canal within six months.

Sir Richard set to work at once with great energy, employing two hundred men at a time, and using timber of his own to the value of £2,000. Materials and timber were also taken from the king's estates of Oatlands and Richmond by permission of the parliament. Weston died within less than a year of the act's passing, but he had so far expedited the work that ten out of the fourteen miles were completed, though at an expenditure much exceeding the original estimate. The work was carried on after his death by his son and Major Pitson, and the canal was opened in November 1653.

The completed canal had ten locks, four weirs, and twelve bridges; but, though it produced a large revenue, it involved the family in litigation, which, when finally settled in 1671, had more than swallowed up all the profits. At the Restoration an impudent attempt was made by a certain John Radcliffe to get the management of the canal into his own hands. A committee of the House of Commons which sat to investigate his claims concluded that "Sir Richard Weston was the designer of the navigation, and they were satisfied that Mr. [John] Weston's estate was left to him encumbered because of his father undertaking the navigation."

=== Agricultural improvements ===
His agricultural improvements were even more important than Sir Richard Weston's canal schemes. He tells us himself that "at the time he went out of England" he had had "thirtie years" experience in husbandrie" and had "improved his land as much as any man in this kingdom hath done." It was probably Sir Richard Weston who about this time introduced into Surrey "the grass called Nonesuch," and we know that, following on the track of Rowland Vaughan, he raised rich crops of hay from irrigated meadows

Sir Richard's irrigated meadows are referred to by a contemporary writer:

Because hay is dear in those parts this year, near three pound a load, Sir Richard Weston told me he sold at near that rate one hundred and fifty loads of his extraordinary hay which his meadows watered with his new river did yield.

Speed also refers to another improvement of Sir Richard's, the most characteristic of all: his introduction of a new system of crop rotation founded on the cultivation of clover, flax, and turnips. This Sir Richard brought from Flanders, where he had noticed its practice during his exile. A full account of the Flemish husbandry, written about 1645, he had addressed to his sons from abroad. This seems to have been circulated in manuscript, but there is no evidence that it was ever printed until 1650, when an imperfect copy was published by Samuel Hartlib, with a dedication to the council of state, and with the date 1605 (evidently a mistake for 1650, and so corrected in manuscript in many copies). Hartlib did not at this time know who the author was.

Subsequently, on 2 May 1651, and again on 10 Oct. of the same year, Hartlib wrote to Sir Richard, whom he had been "credibly informed" was the author of the "Discours," asking him for some further information on the subject of clover cultivation, and requesting him to ‘make compleat and sufficiently enlarged’ for the benefit of all "his former treatise." As Sir Richard took no notice, Hartlib republished the pamphlet in 1652 from a more correct copy, adding transcripts of his two letters to Sir Richard. Hartlib's "Legacy of Husbandry" (a collection of anonymous notes on agricultural matters written by Robert Child, Cressy Dymock, and others, which Hartlib edited and published at the same time as he pirated Sir Richard's work) has sometimes been erroneously attributed to Sir Richard Weston. This error would not need comment were it not for the fact that in 1742 one T. Harris published a very incorrect copy of this "Legacy," which he attributed to Sir Richard Weston, and then proceeded to support this assertion by foisting Sir Richard's name into the text.

=== Discourse on the Husbandry of Brabant and Flanders, 1645 ===
In Weston’s Discourse on the Husbandry of Brabant and Flanders, published by Hartlib in 1645, we may mark the dawn of the vast improvements which have since been effected in Britain. Weston had the merit of being the first who introduced the great clover, as it was then called, into England agriculture, about 1645, and probably turnips also.

His directions for the cultivation of clover are better than was to be expected. It thrives best, he says, when you sow it on the worst and barrenest ground, such as our worst heath ground is in England. The ground is to be pared and burnt, and unslacked lime must be added to the ashes. It is next to be well ploughed and harrowed; and about ten pounds of clover seed must be sown on an acre in April or the end of March.

If you intended to preserve seed, then the second crop must be let stand till it come to a full and dead ripeness, and you shall have at the least five bushels per acre. Being once sown, it will last five years; and then being ploughed, it will yield, three or four years together, rich crops of wheat, and after that a crop of oats, with which clover seed is to be sown again. It is in itself an excellent manure, Weston adds; and so it should be, to enable land to bear this treatment. In less than ten years after its introduction, that is, before 1655, the culture of clover, exactly according to the present method, seems to have been well known in England, and it had also made its way to Ireland.

== Selected publications ==
- Sir Richard Weston (1645) Discourse on the Husbandry of Brabant and Flanders, published by Samuel Hartlib, 24 pages.
- Richard Weston, Samuel Hartlib (1655) Discourse on the Husbandry of Brabant and Flanders, enlarged edition.
