= Richard Willis =

Richard Willis may refer to:

- Sir Richard Willis, 1st Baronet (1614–1690), Royalist officer during the English Civil War
- Richard Willis (bishop) (1664–1734), English bishop
- Richard Storrs Willis (1819–1900), American composer, music critic and journal editor
- Richard Willis (Medal of Honor) (1826–1896), U.S. Navy sailor and Medal of Honor recipient during the American Civil War
- Richard Gardiner Willis (1865–1929), politician in Manitoba, Canada
- Richard Raymond Willis (1876–1966), English recipient of the Victoria Cross
- Richard Willis (publicist and agent) (1876–1945)
- Richard Willis (cricketer) (1799–1877), English cricketer
- Richard H. Willis, American economist
- Richard Willis (Royal Navy officer) (1755–1829)
- Richard Willis (actor) (born 1958), formerly married to June Page and Kate O'Mara
