= Robert Willis (engineer) =

English academic

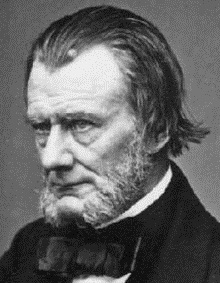
Robert Willis

The Reverend Robert Willis (27 February 1800 – 28 February 1875) was an English academic. He was the first Cambridge professor to win widespread recognition as a mechanical engineer, and first to set the scientific study of vowels on a respectable foundation. He is now best remembered for his extensive writings on architectural history, including many studies of mediaeval cathedrals and a four-volume treatise on the architecture of the University of Cambridge. He was described by Pevsner as "the greatest English architectural historian of the 19th century".

== Biography ==
=== Early life and first years in Cambridge ===
Willis was born in London on 27 February 1800. His father was Dr Robert Darling Willis, physician to King George III. He was a grandson of Francis Willis. His paternal uncle was Rear Admiral Richard Willis.

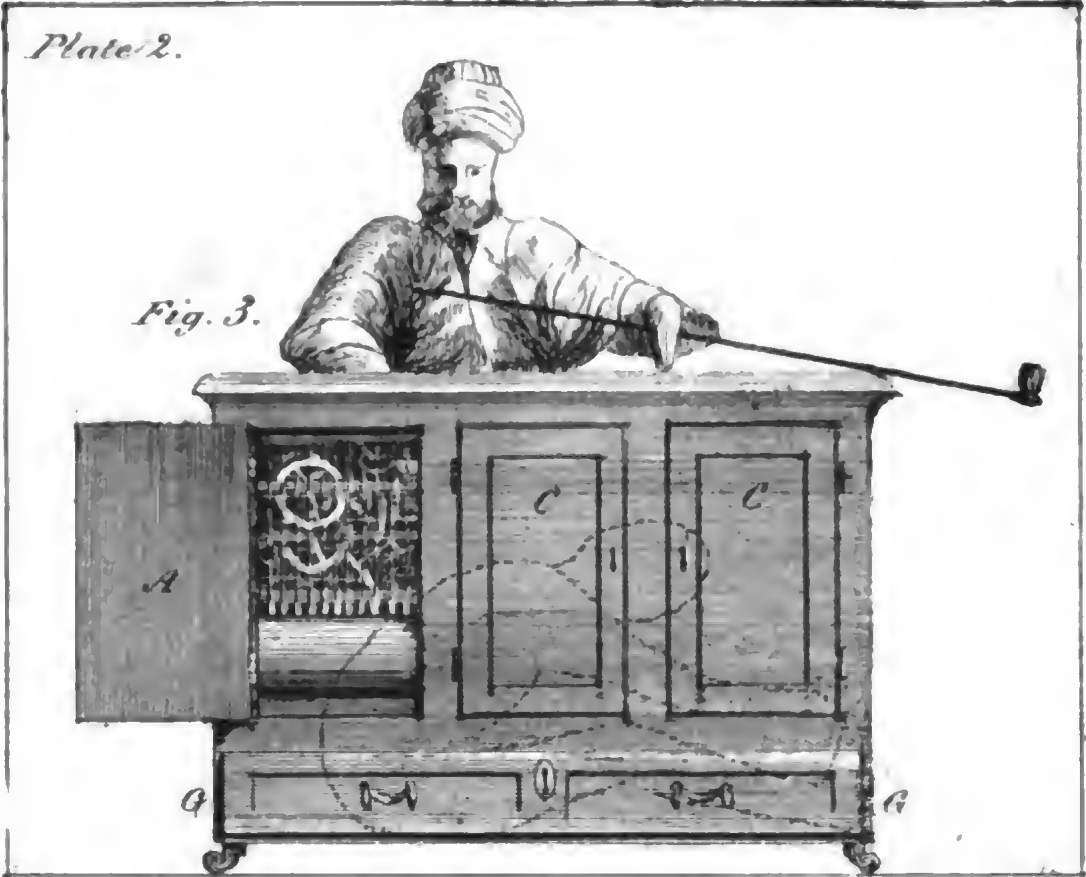
Willis's 1821 illustration of how a human could be concealed within the supposed chess automaton

His health was delicate, which prevented him from going to school, and he was privately tutored. He showed talent in music, and as a draughtsman, and when he was 19 took out a patent on an improved pedal harp. In 1820 he went to a demonstration of Wolfgang von Kempelen's "Turk", a supposed automaton chess player, and the following year published An attempt to Analyze the Automaton Chess Player, in which he showed how a human player could be concealed within the chest housing the supposed machinery.

In 1821 he studied with the Rev. Thomas Kidd, a noted classical scholar, at King's Lynn. In this town, with its mediaeval churches and guildhalls, Willis's interest in architecture developed, and he made his first known architectural drawings. Buchanan (2013) reproduces some of these drawings, and comments on his ability not just to draw, but to show the underlying structural relationships of a building, especially remarkable as he had no known training in the craft. In 1822 he entered Gonville and Caius College, Cambridge, from which he received his B.A. in 1826. He was elected a Frankland Fellow of the College the same year and in 1827 he was ordained deacon and priest. He was promoted to a Foundation Fellow in 1829, and became Steward of the College, positions he held until his marriage, in 1832, to Mary Anne, daughter of Charles Humfrey of Cambridge. They were resident in Cambridge for the remainder of their lives, but also later had a London house.

Cambridge in the 1830s was a time in which science was becoming increasingly important, and was home to a group of scholars known as the "Cambridge Network". Two of these men were of particular importance, Charles Babbage and William Whewell. Babbage was building his difference engine at this time, a mechanical precursor of the digital computer. Willis drew detailed sketches of parts of the machinery. Whewell shared interests with Willis in science, history of architecture and mathematics, and was a lifelong colleague.

=== Phonetics ===
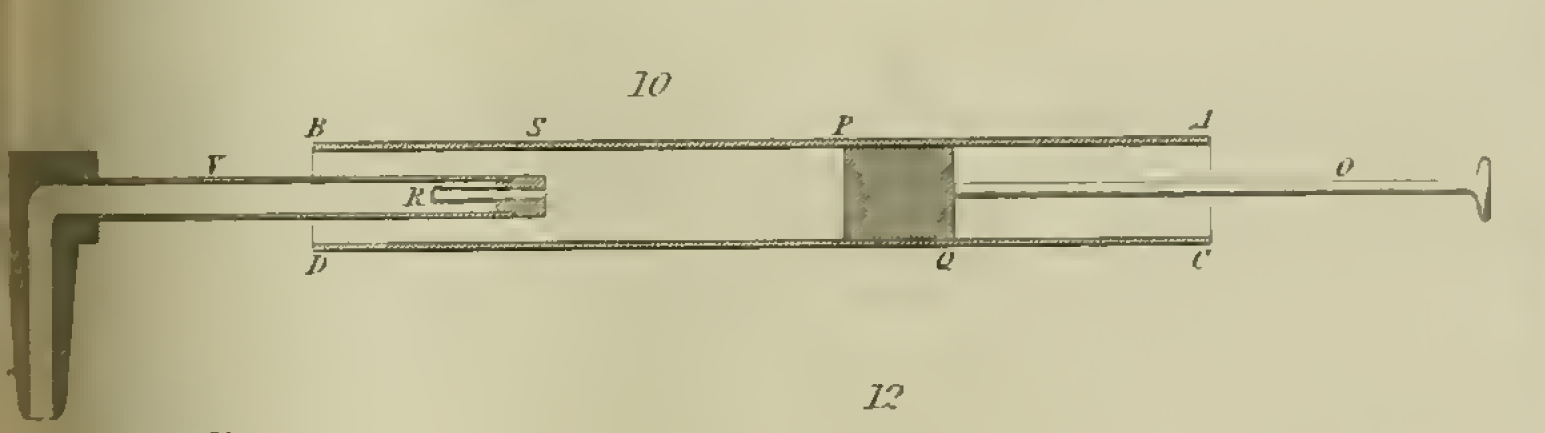
One of the pieces of apparatus used by Willis to generate vowel sounds. The reed is at R, air is pumped through the L-shaped tube at the left. The plunger P-Q-O varies the acoustic length of the outer tube.

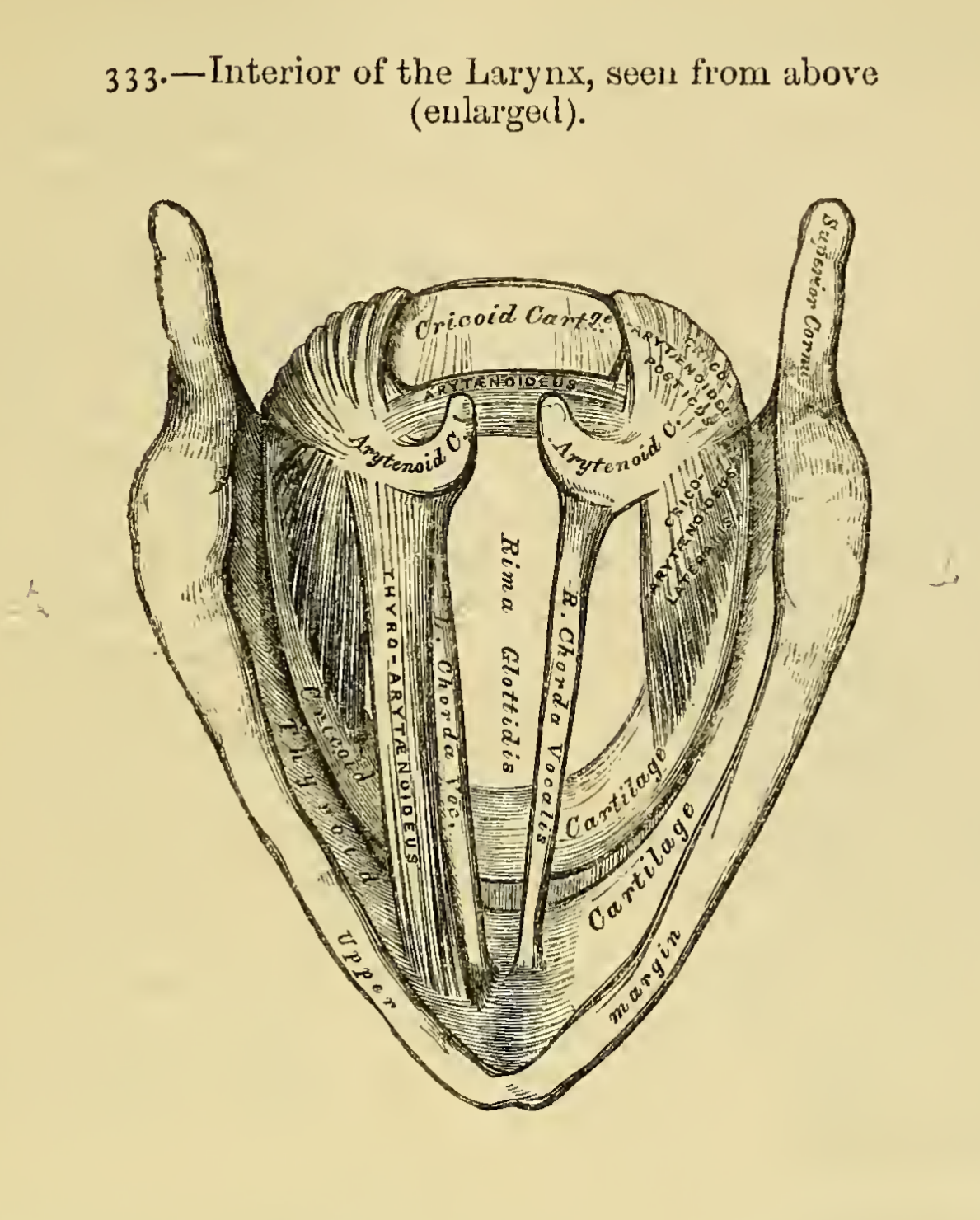
Willis's diagram of the larynx as used in Gray's Anatomy.

In 1828 and 1829, Willis presented two papers on the production of vowel sounds to the Cambridge Philosophical Society, which were published in 1830 as On vowel sounds, and on reed-organ pipes. In 1830 he was made a Fellow of the Royal Society, partly on the basis of that work. In his work on vowel sounds, following on from that of von Kempelen and Kratzenstein, he rejected too close an imitation of the human vocal apparatus, noting that the mouth has important functions other than speech, and that parrots, with very different mouth parts, can produce recognisable speech. His apparatus typically used a reed, driven by a flow of air to produce a note, and a tube whose length could be varied. At different lengths, different vowel sounds were produced. His theory that the vowel sound depended on a single harmonic frequency in addition to the principal pitch is today regarded as too simple, but his work was the first systematic investigation in the field, and provided a valuable basis for later studies. In 1833 he published a paper On the Mechanism of the Larynx. This work used both mechanical analogues and anatomical analysis of the larynx to provide a mechanical model of its operation. Willis noted that a leather or india-rubber band laid along a wooden surface could act as a reed, and that the pitch would change as the band was stretched. He argued that the vocal ligaments (vocal chords in modern usage) operated in this way. He correctly identified the muscles that acted to stretch and relax the vocal chords in sound production, and equally importantly those that opened and closed the airways, allowing either sound production or normal breathing, when air passes the vocal chords without producing a sound. A quarter of a century later, Gray used Willis's diagram of the Larynx in his Anatomy (1858). Hart (1966) states that these observations are "basic to the laws of laryngeal physiology today".

=== Engineering ===
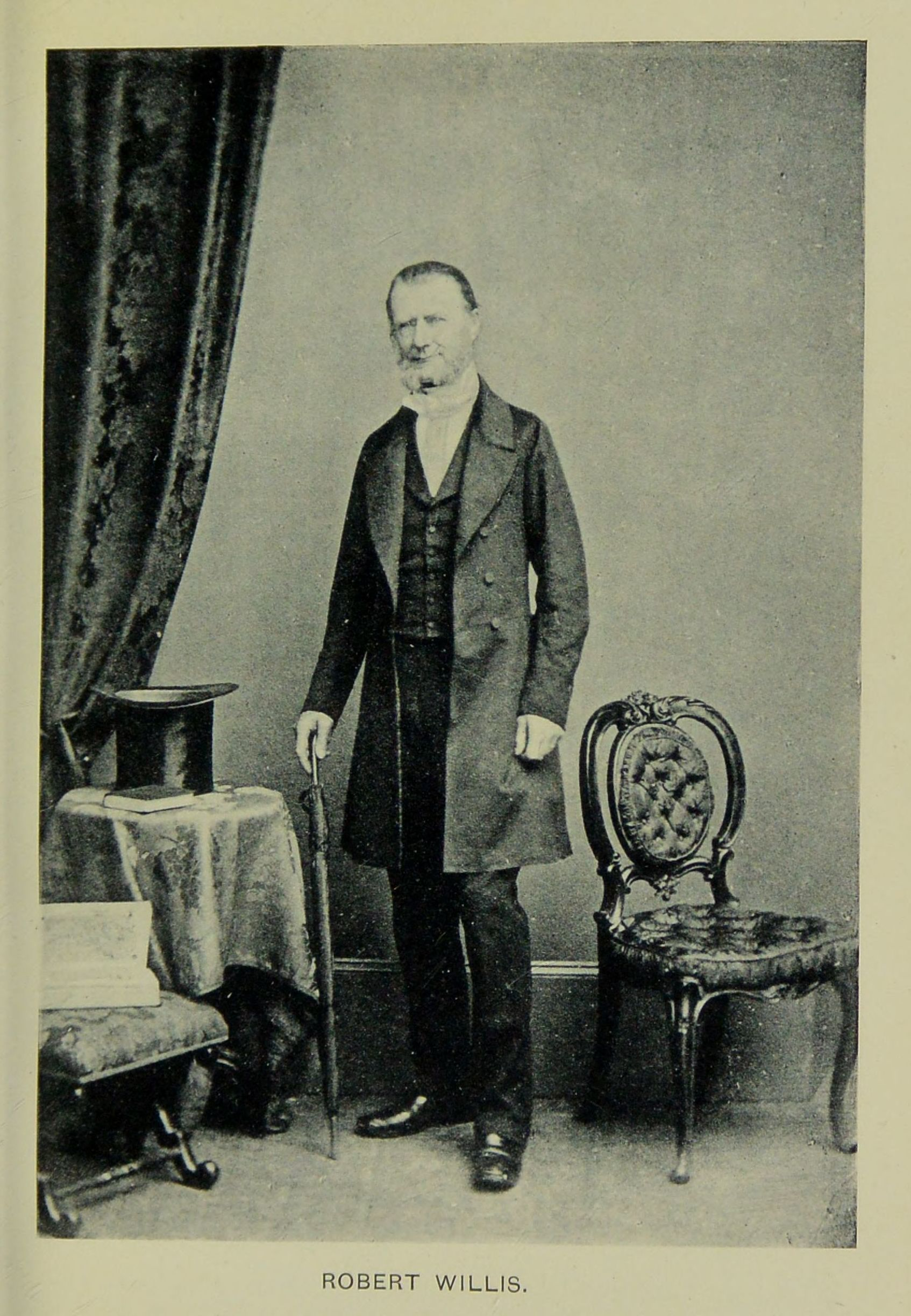
Robert Willis at about the time he lectured at the School of Mines

From 1837 to 1875 Willis served as Jacksonian Professor of Natural Philosophy at Cambridge, and from 1853 onward he was a lecturer in applied mechanics at the government school of mines. In 1837 he read a paper On the teeth of wheels, and in the following year published this in more detail, proposing the Odontagraph, (also called "Odontograph") a device to allow a craftsman to determine the proper shape of teeth on wheels of different diameters. This was widely used for many years. In 1841 he published his Principles of Mechanism, and in 1851 A System of Apparatus for the Use of Lecturers and Experimenters in Mechanical Philosophy.

Principles of Mechanism, Willis's major engineering work, provided a mathematical analysis of the "relations of motions". It contrasted with earlier approaches in that it was not concerned with utility – a crank is defined as a machine for converting reciprocating to circular motion, or vice versa, whether it is used for raising water, grinding flour or sawing timber. He classified machines in two ways, firstly in terms of the type of contact: rolling, sliding, wrapping, linking and reduplicating; and second on whether the relationship between the connected motions was fixed or variable. His examples were not confined to man-made machines. He showed that the joints of a crab's claw worked in the same way as Hooke's universal joint. Willis's classification was influential, being adopted by other writers, including William Whewell By 1870, thirteen works on mechanism had used Willis's scheme of classification.

Examples of classification of mechanisms, from Willis (1841)
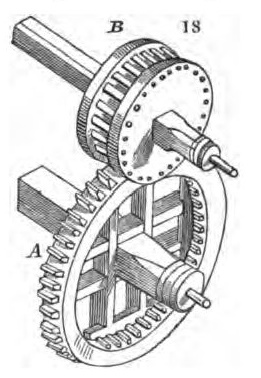
Rolling contact

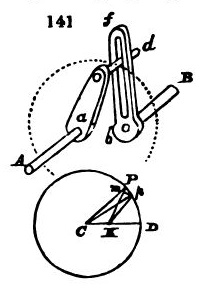
Sliding contact

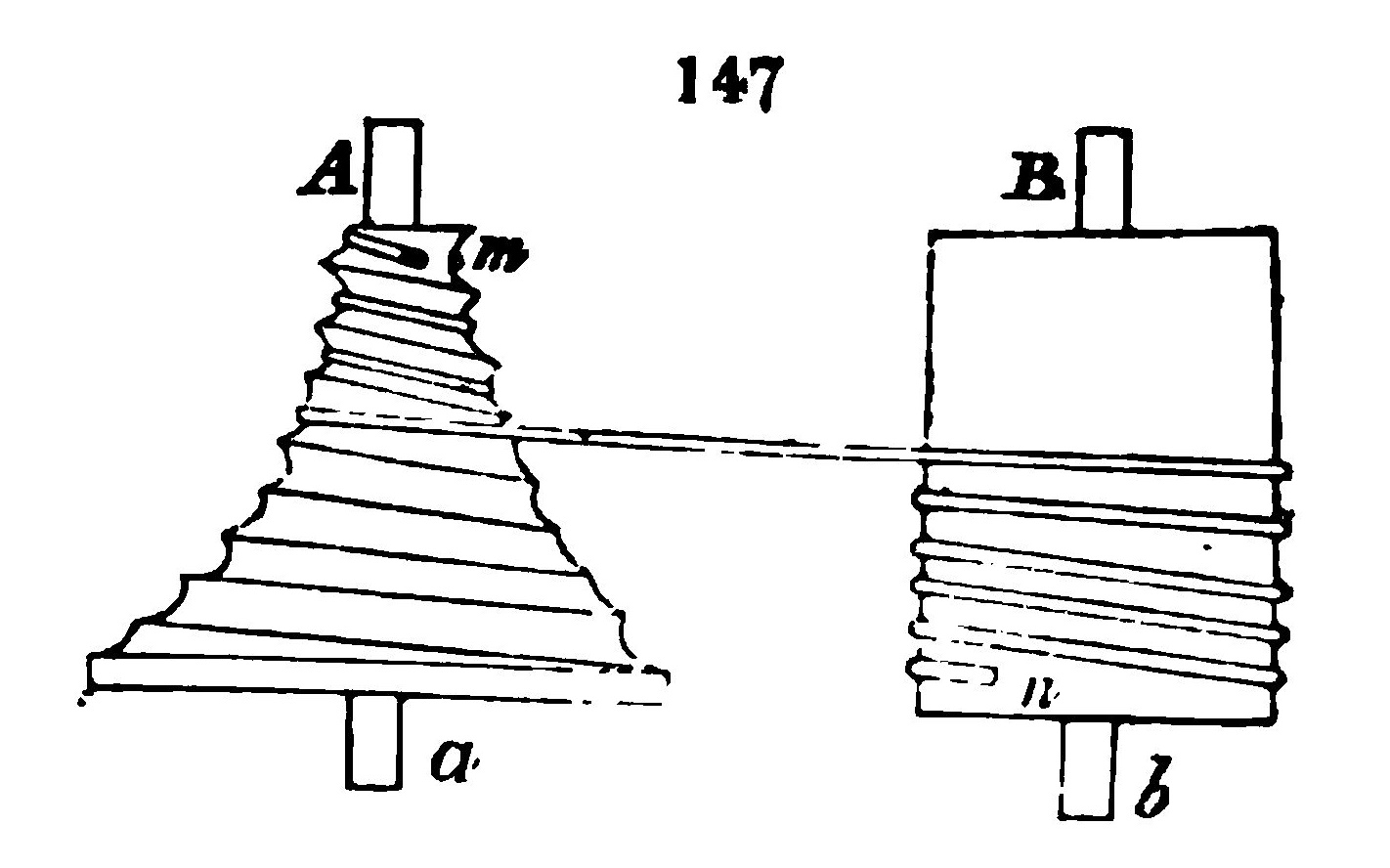
Wrapping contact

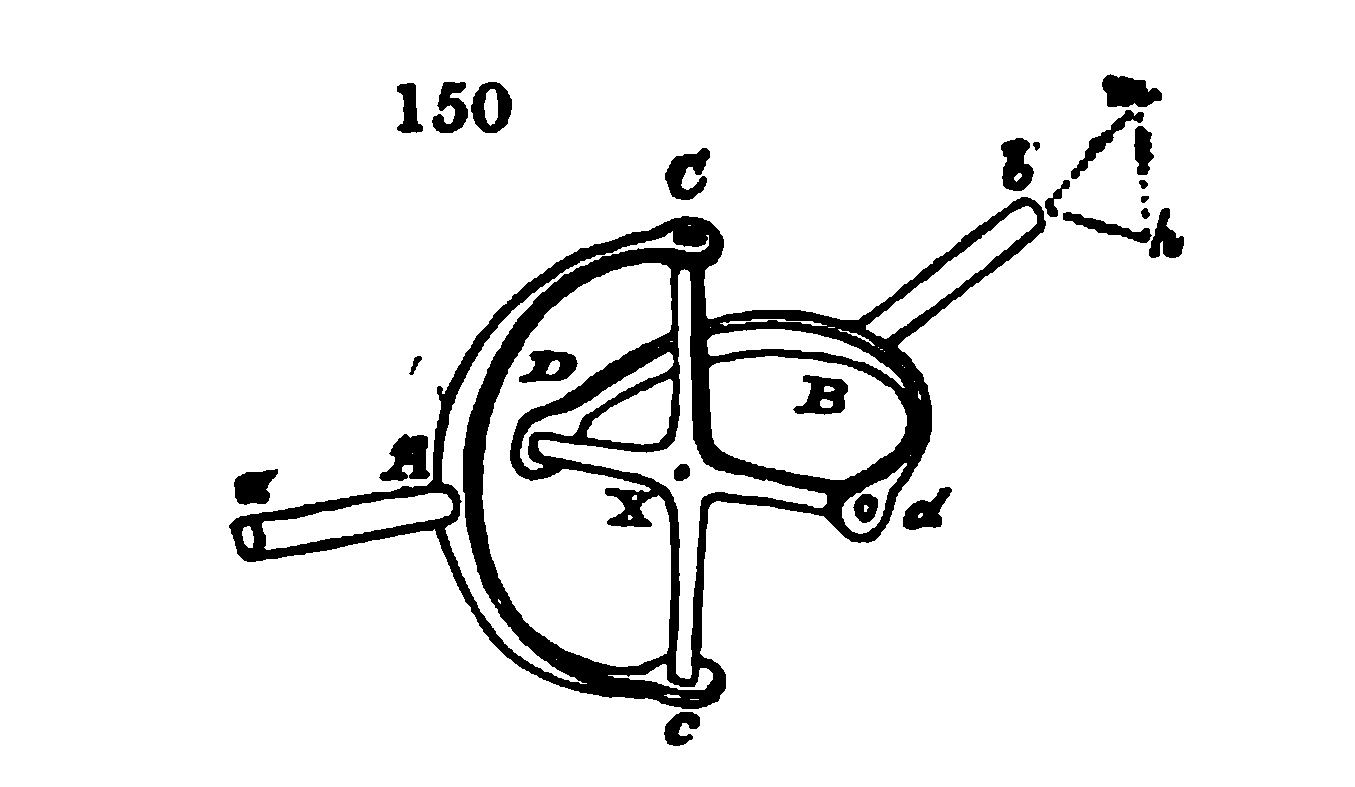
Linking contact (Hooke's universal joint)

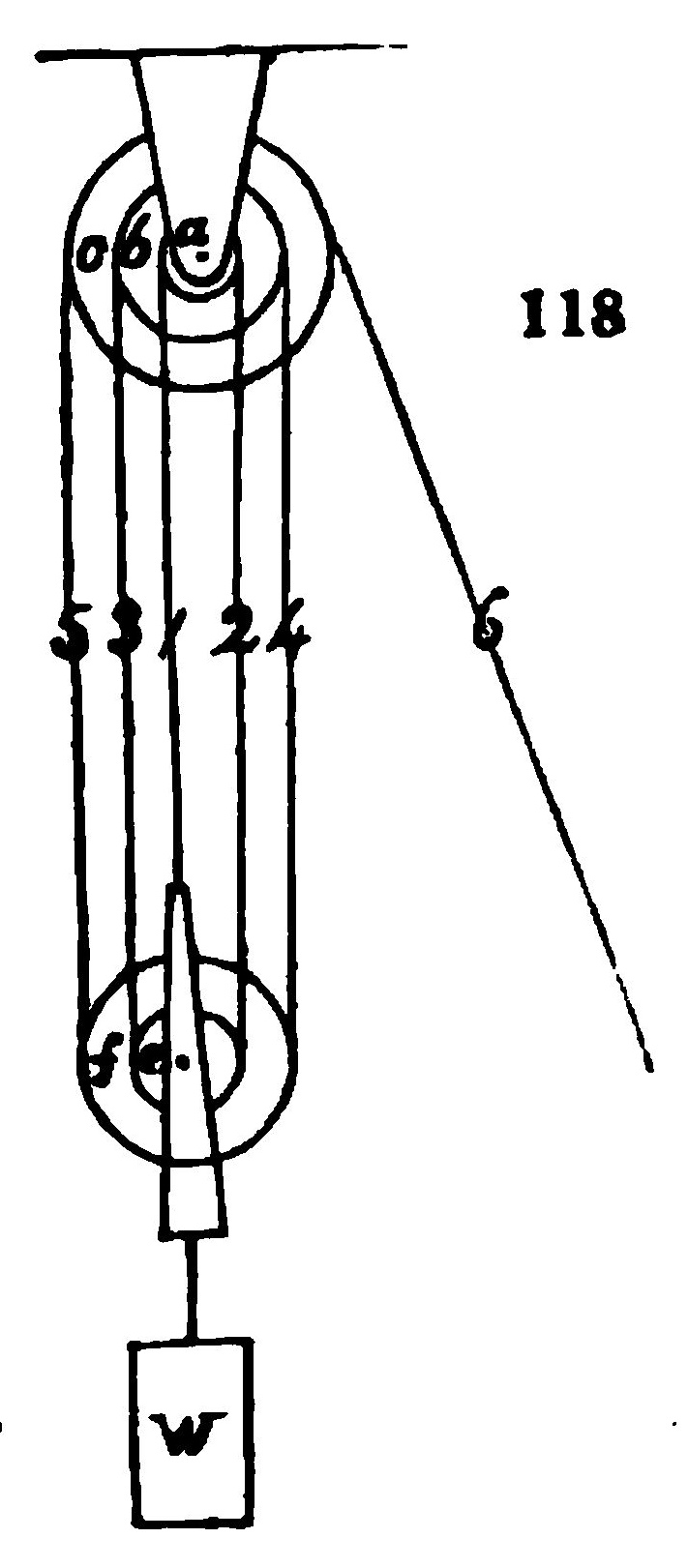
Reduplicating contact

=== Architecture and the Cathedral Histories ===
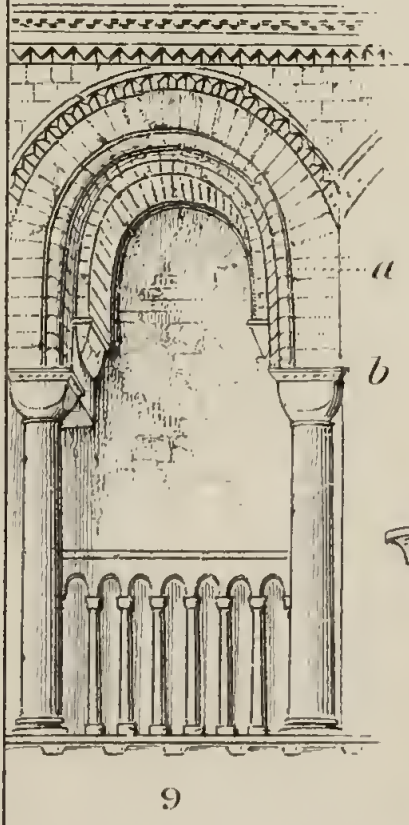
Figure from Remarks showing the real (a) and apparent (b) springing points of an arch

Willis's earliest published work on architecture was the Remarks on the architecture of the middle ages, especially of Italy based on material collected during the 1832-3 honeymoon trip, and published in 1835. The book was as much an analysis of the gothic style in general as a work on Italian buildings in particular. His approach to architectural style recognised a difference between the real and the apparent structure of a building, which he referred to as the mechanical and the decorative aspects, respectively. In a Greek temple, the weight of the entablature is borne by the columns – both force and column are vertical and there is no difference between the real and apparent structure. With arched structures such as vaults and arcades, this no longer the case. An arch appears to be supported by the capital from which is springs, but the actual forces may be exerted at a different point, as illustrated in the figure to the right. The ribs of a vault are often continued down on separate shafts of a clustered column, which appear to bear the individual loads of the ribs. In reality the structure is the entire column, supplemented by the lateral buttressing that is needed to take the transverse thrust of the vault. For the result to be aesthetically pleasing, it is the apparent (decorative) structure that must satisfy the eye as to the stability and harmony of the building Willis also considered the origin of the pointed arch. Whewell had supported the idea that pointed forms derived from techniques for cross-vaulting rectangular spaces. Willis disagreed, arguing that the arch itself was a key stylistic feature, and that gothic introduced several related innovations, including the pointed arch, foliation, and tracery.

Willis's historical and descriptive work on architecture included works on individual buildings, including (Hereford Cathedral, 1842; Sextry Barn, Ely, 1843; Canterbury Cathedral, 1845; Winchester Cathedral, 1846; Chichester Cathedral,1861; Worcester Cathedral, 1863; Sherborne Minster, 1865; Glastonbury Abbey, 1866) as well as analyses of vaulting (1842) and the Flamboyant style (1842). Most of his cathedral studies were initially presented as lectures, often accompanied by guided tours of the buildings. Many, but not all, were subsequently written up for publication.

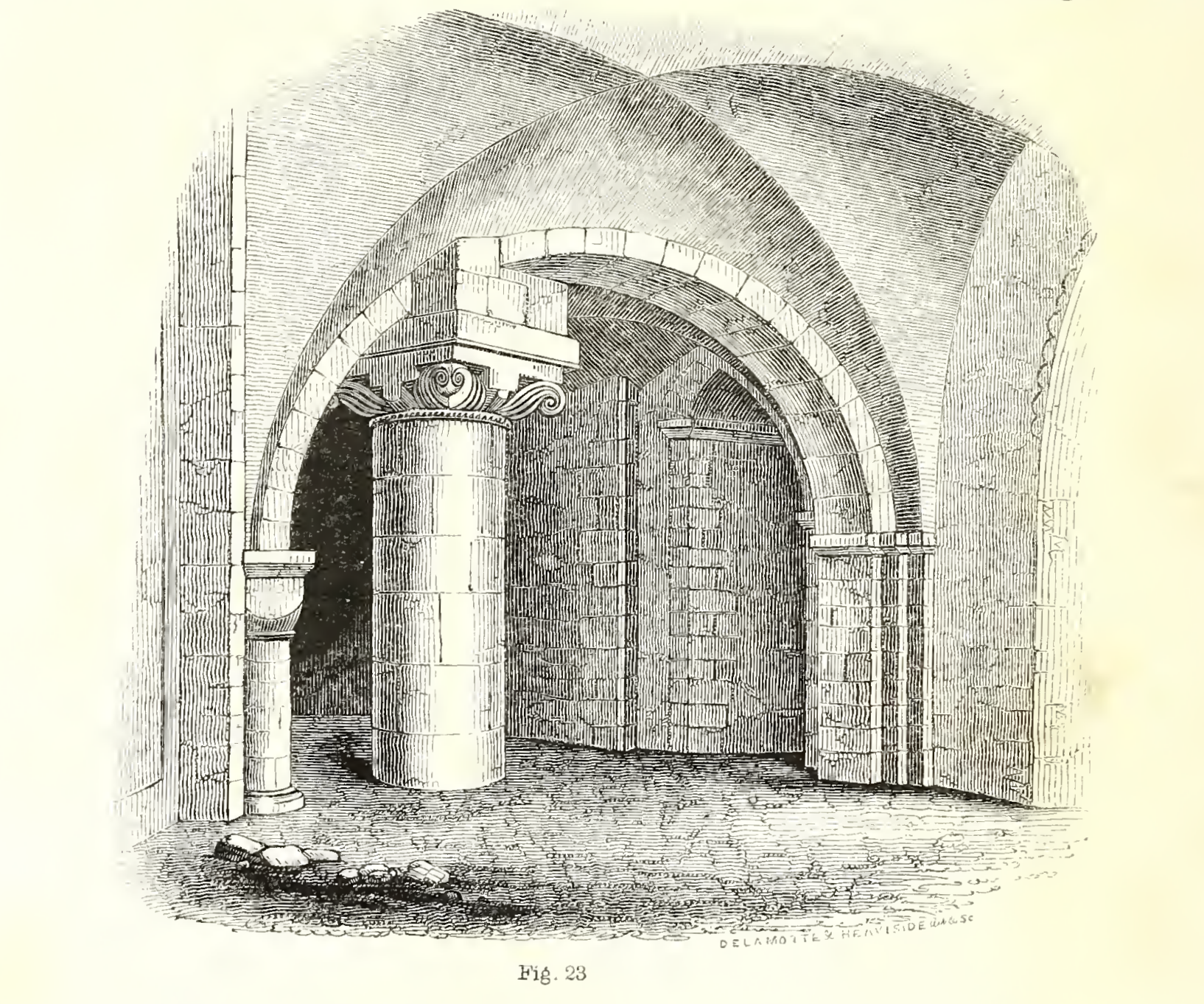
Willis's illustration of the Canterbury crypt, showing a column inserted when the new choir was built in the late 12th-Century

Willis's analyses used both documentary evidence and a detailed examination of the building. As he put it in his Architectural history of Canterbury Cathedral: "My plan therefore has been, first to collect all the written evidence, and then by a close comparison of it with the building itself, to make the best identification of one with the other that I have been able." He was noted for his ability to discriminate different periods of building both on stylistic grounds, and using discontinuities in the structure. His 1845 publication on Canterbury was, as noted by Buchanan, the first work in the English language to be entitled an "architectural history"". Canterbury is the best documented of all the mediaeval Cathedrals in England, with two detailed contemporary accounts by Edmer (c. 1060 – c. 1126) and Gervase (c.1141 – c.1210), both monks of Canterbury. Willis quotes extensively from the sources, including his own complete translation of Gervase's account, which covers the fire of 1174 and the subsequent rebuilding. The fire destroyed the norman choir, but not the crypt, which remains to the present day. So differences in the layout of the new work of the late 12th-Century could be traced. Willis pointed out visible consequences, in particular columns that had been inserted into the crypt to provide support for those in the upper structure, that no longer corresponded to the old layout.

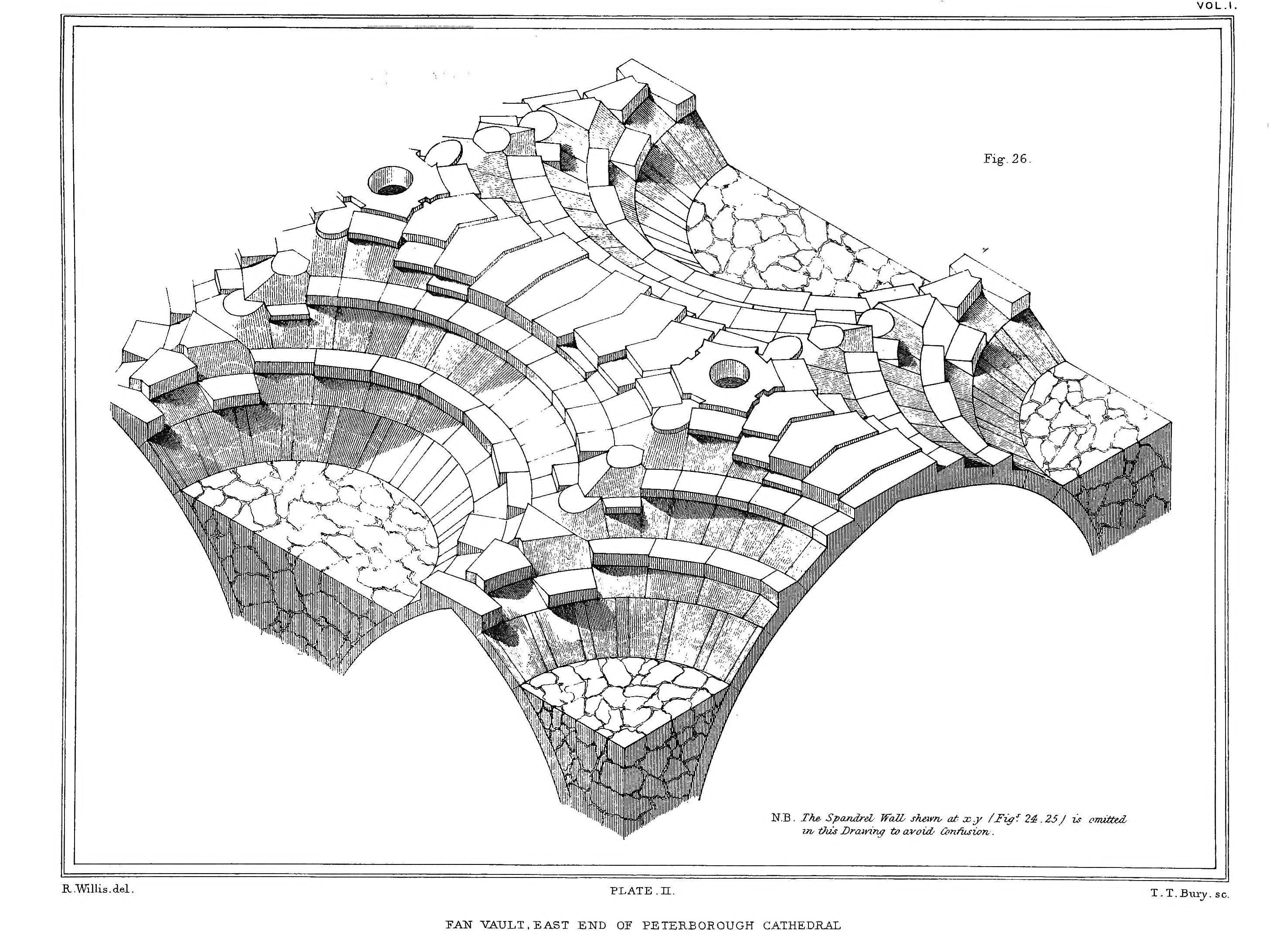
Willis's illustration of the structure of a fan vault in Peterborough Cathedral

Willis's 1860 and 1861 lectures to the Archaeological Institute on Gloucester and Peterborough Cathedrals were not published. For Gloucester, Freeman (1883) gives a historical description of the cathedral based on Willis's lecture, and Buchanan has summarised Willis's manuscript notes on the topic. In the work on Gloucester, Willis for the first time initiated excavation, investigating possible Saxon work in the crypt. His examination of the later 14th-Century work, particularly of the south transept, showed that Gloucester represented the earliest use of the perpendicular style (not later than 1337). Willis had earlier identified the vaults of the Gloucester cloister as the earliest example of fan vaulting in England. In the case of Peterborough, Willis gives descriptions of several of the vaults, and illustrations of the fan vaulting, in On the Construction of the Vaults of the Middle Ages. Buchanan (2019) gives an account of the 1861 Peterborough meeting, contrasting the roles of local antiquarians and national experts such as Willis.

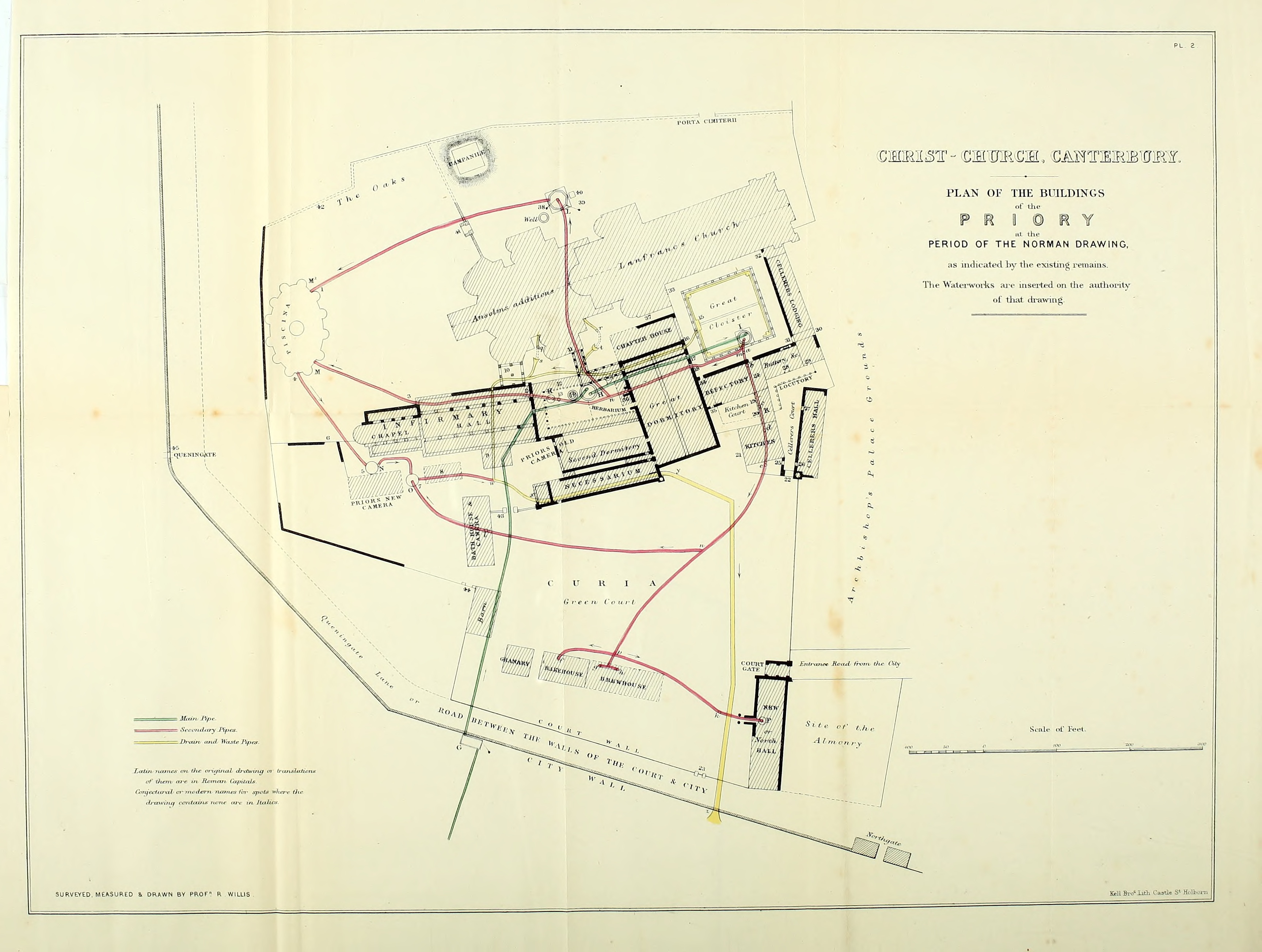
Willis's version of the 12th-Century "Waterworks Plan" showing the buildings aligned to existing structures

The last of the historical studies to appear in Willis's lifetime was the work on the monastic buildings at Canterbury. It was published in 1868, although based on examination of the buildings 20 years earlier. Christ Church Canterbury was the largest monastery in England, with around 150 monks. Monastic buildings raised a rather different set of problems from churches. While there have been changes in the way churches have been used over the centuries, the main functions continued, and the various parts of a church are easily identified. The monasteries were suppressed in the 16th century, which involved considerable destruction. What remained was adapted to new functions often with much structural change. Thus identifying the various parts of the monastic complex was an important task. For Canterbury, again, the documentation was unusually full. In particular the famous "waterworks plan" shows the system of pipes and cisterns installed in the 12th century. But equally important for the historian, it also shows the buildings that existed at the time. Willis reproduces a 17th-Century engraving of the plan, and also his own version which aligns the plan to the positions of known existing structures. He shows his usual skill in explicating the various stages of the buildings he examines, but also pays more attention to aspects of everyday life. For example in discussing the building known as the necessarium, i.e. latrine, he cites the instructions give by Archbishop Lanfrance to the watchman to examine all the sedilia at night in case any of the monks have fallen asleep. Willis suggests that this might have been the origin of the other name for this facility, the "Third Dormitory".

As an aid to his descriptive work he invented the Cymagraph to copy the shapes of architectural mouldings (1842).

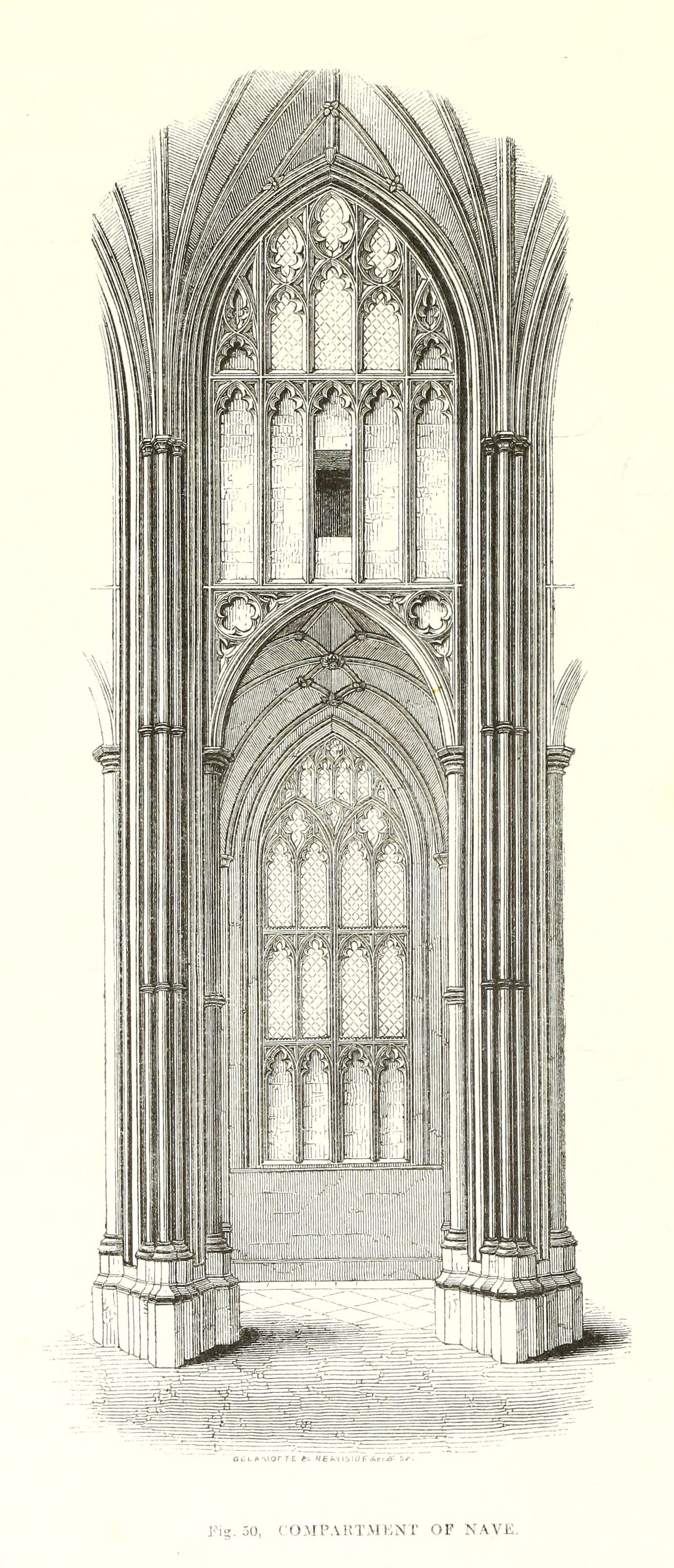
Compartment of the nave of Canterbury Cathedral

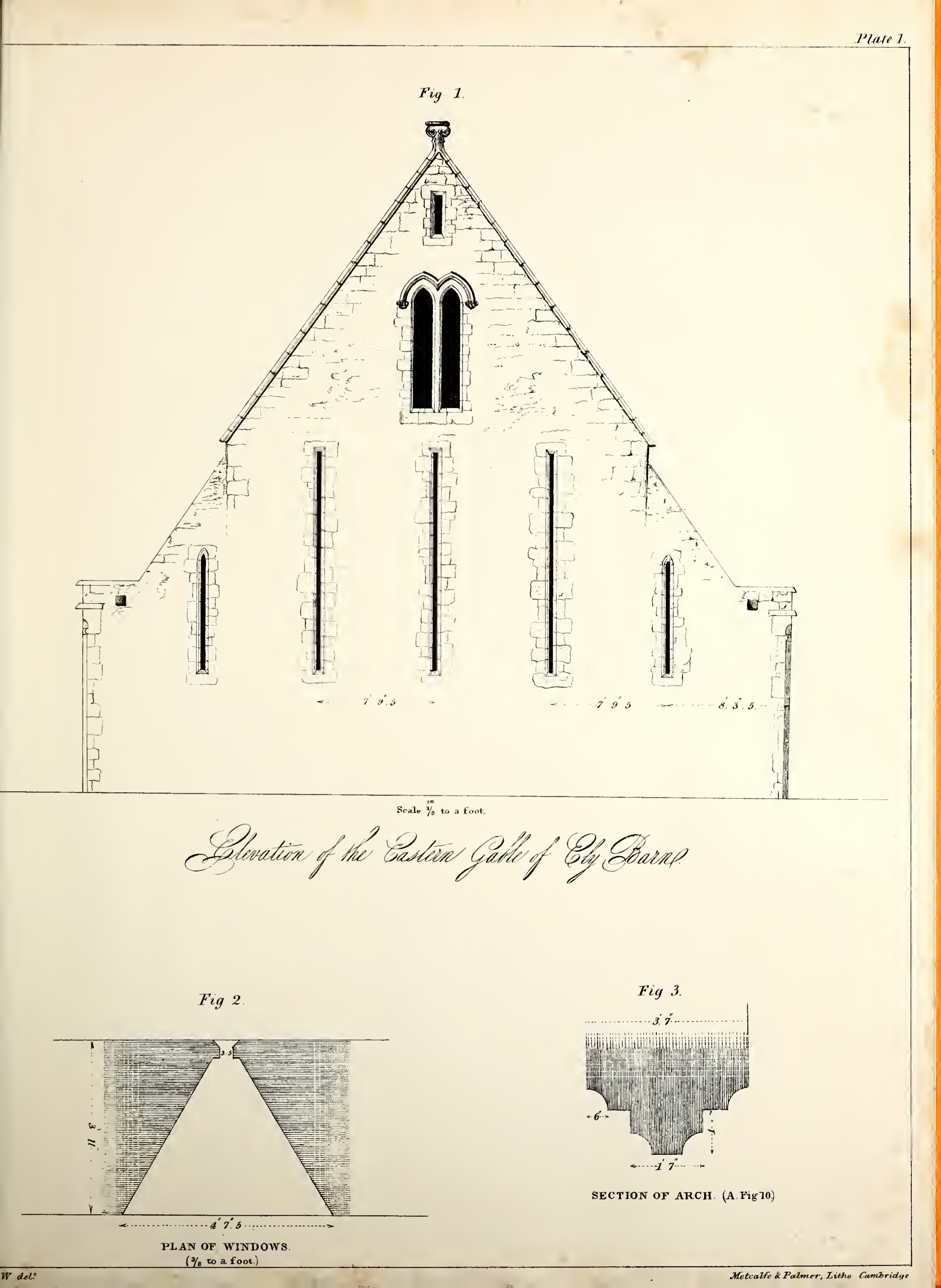
Eastern gable of the Sextry Barn, Ely

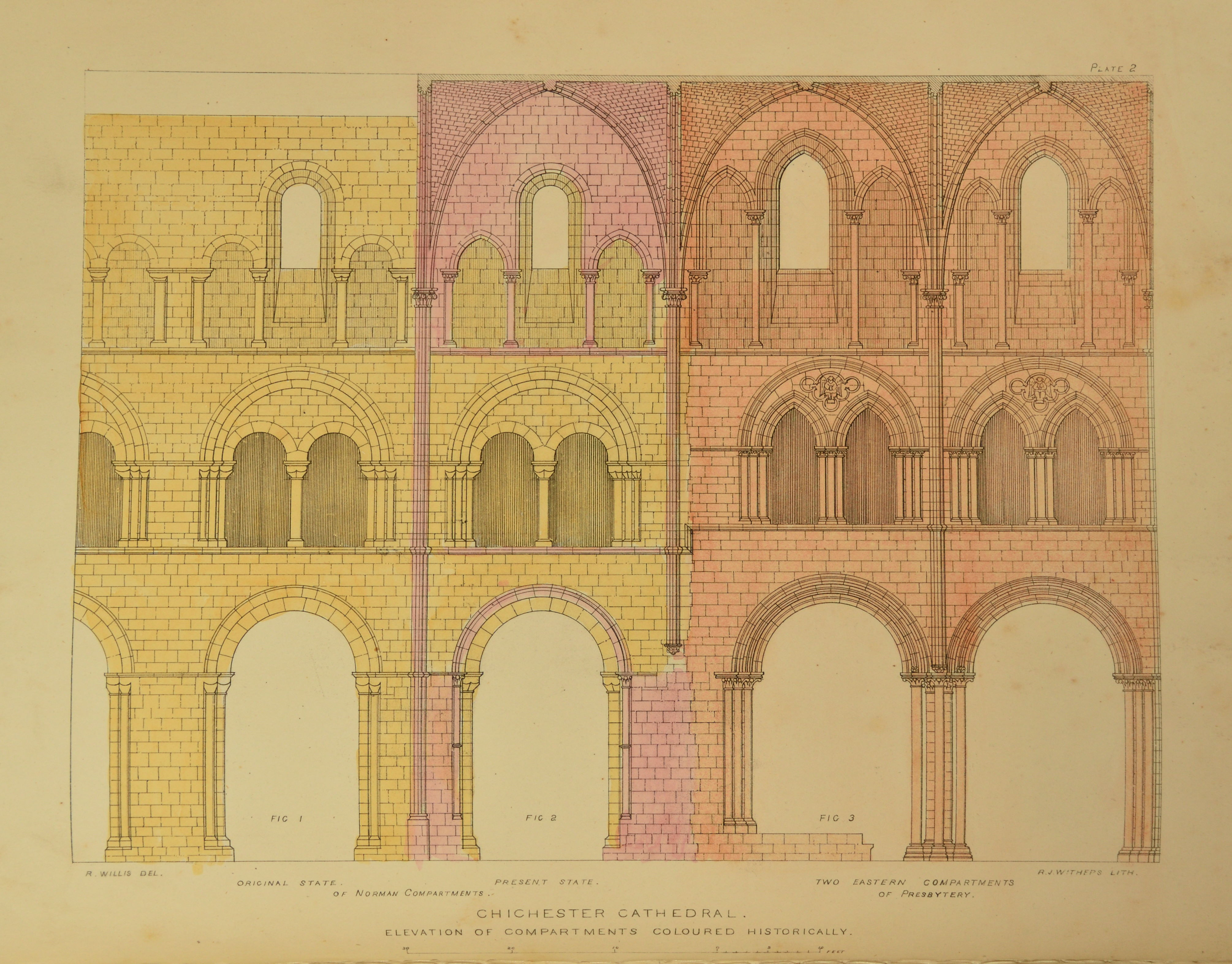
Elevation of Chichester Cathedral

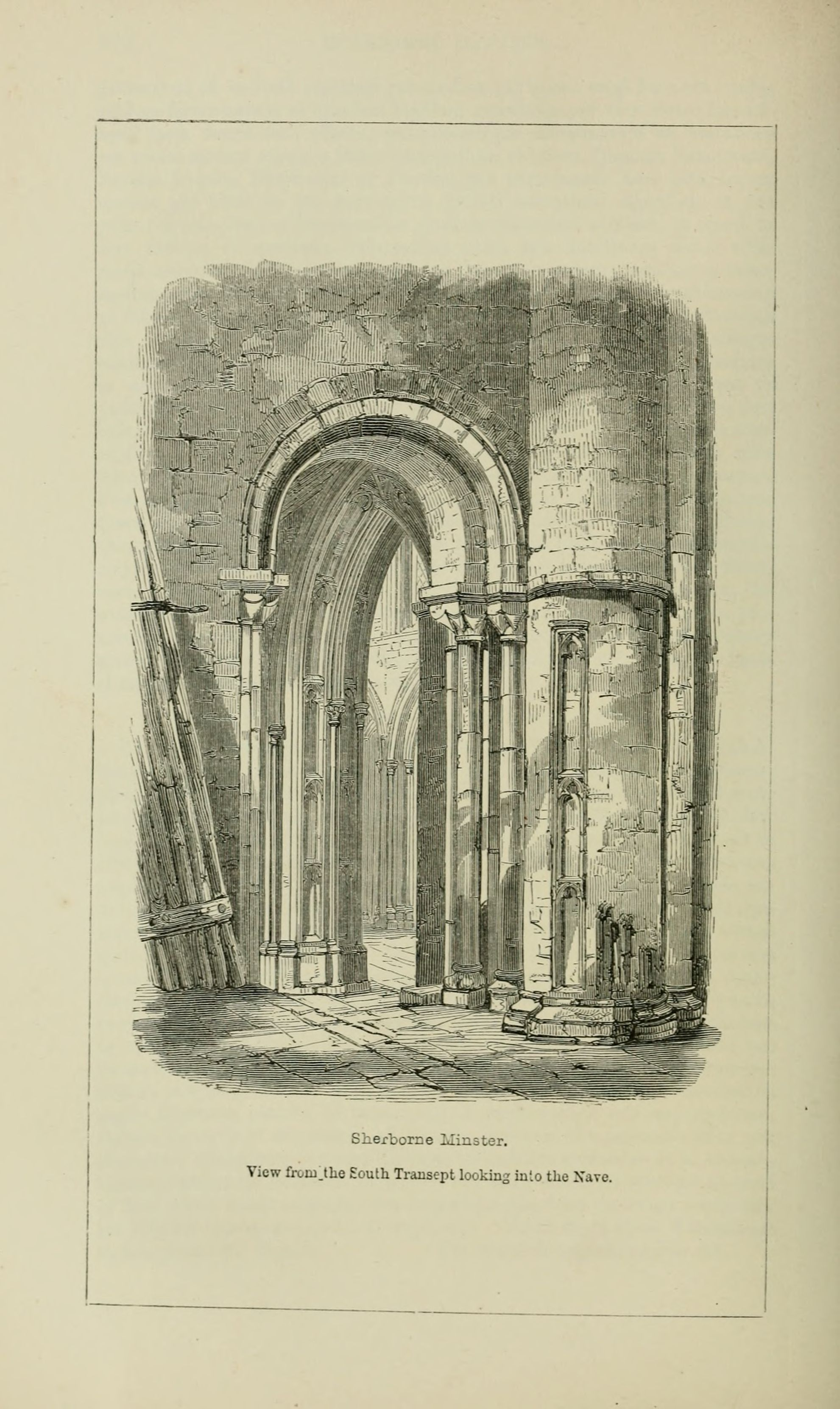
Transept of Sherborne Abbey showing perpendicular carved panel on column, destroyed in restoration

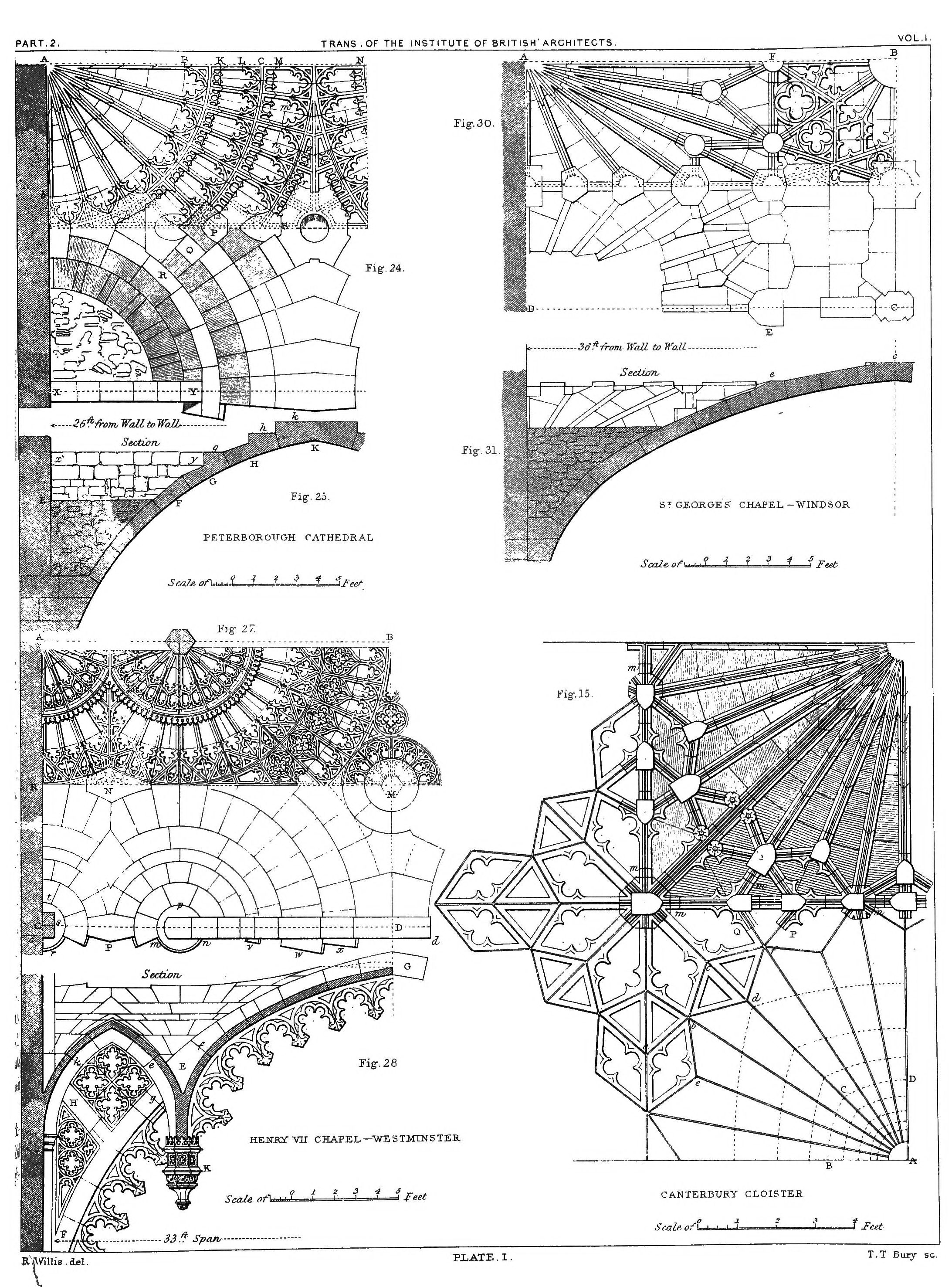
Illustrations of vaults

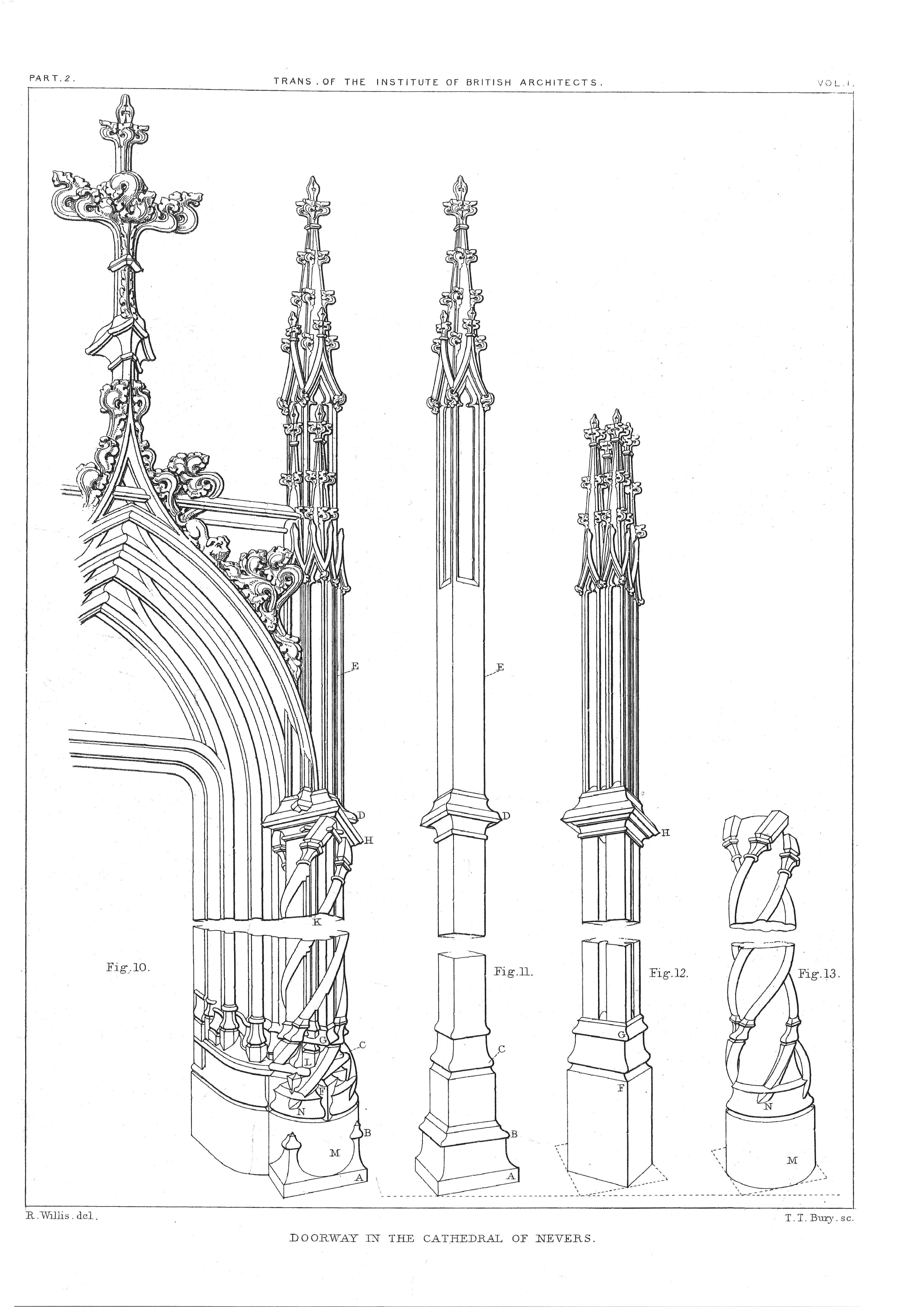
Doorway at Nevers illustrating the interpenetrations of the flamboyant style

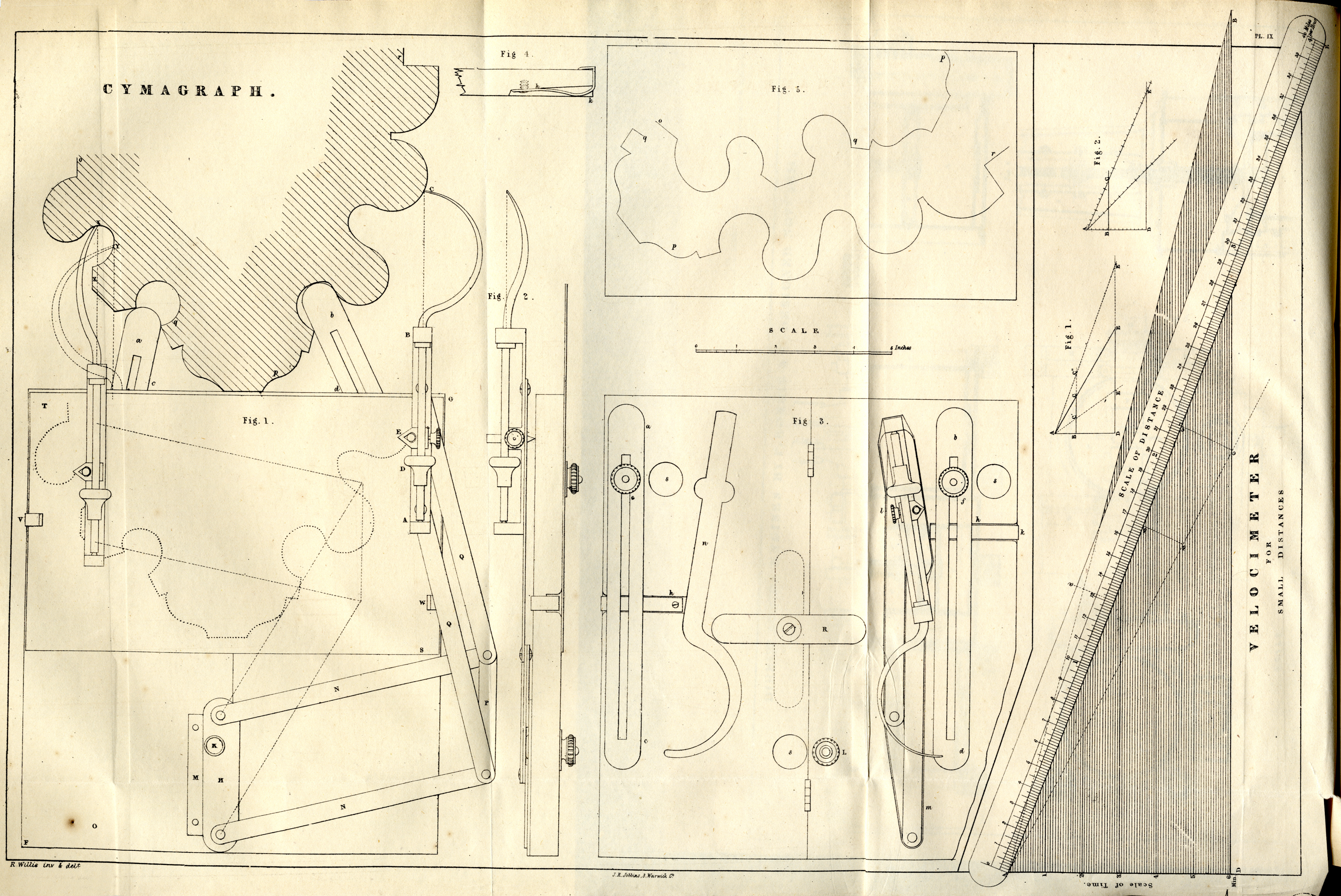
Willis' Cymagraph, instrument for copying the outline of mouldings

=== Societies and commissions ===
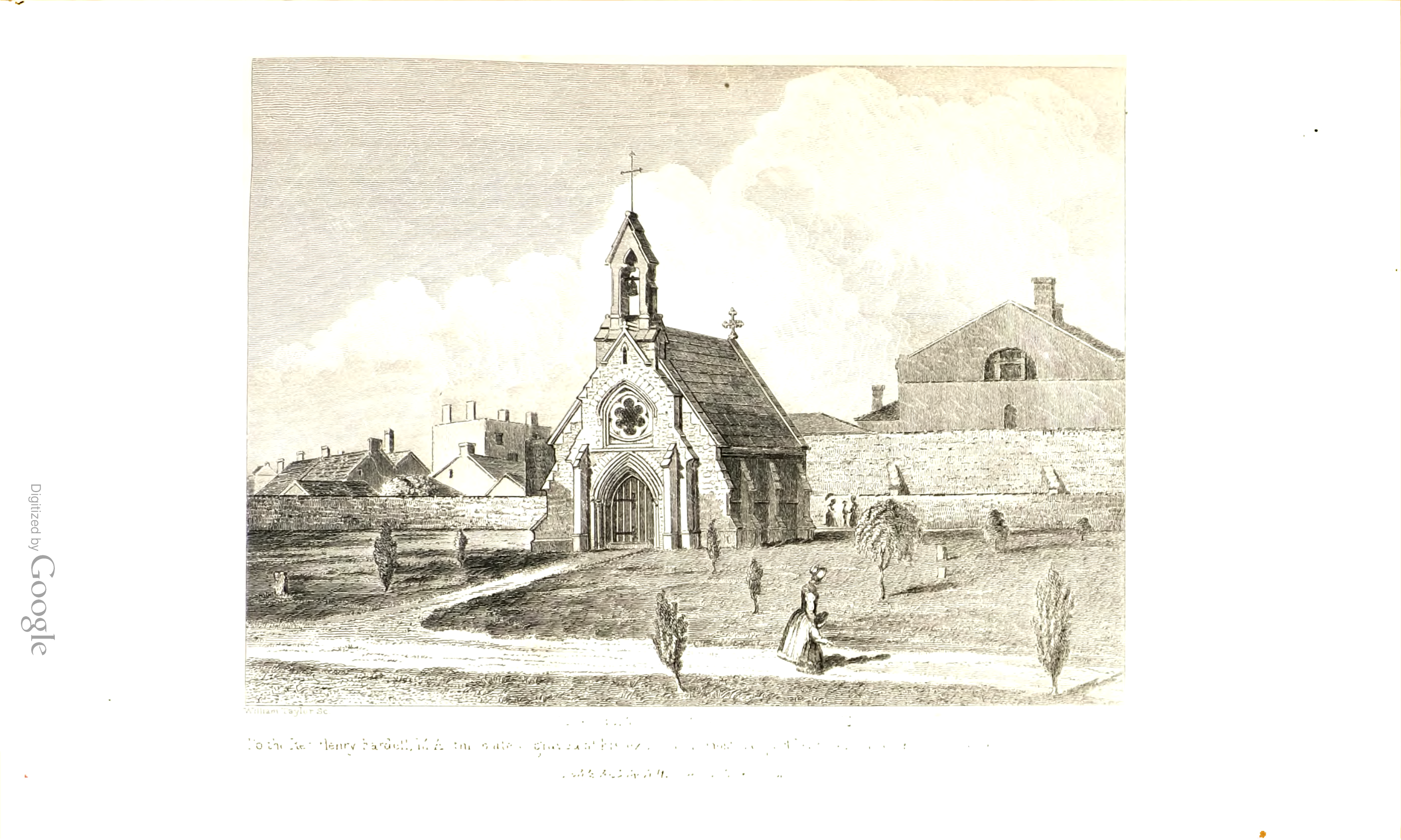
King's Walk Cemetery Chapel, Wisbech

In 1839, the Cambridge Camden Society was formed by undergraduate students at Cambridge University to promote "the study of Gothic Architecture, and of Ecclesiastical Antiques", and Willis became a Vice-President. While Willis was happy to agree that mediaeval gothic was the appropriate form for new churches, he objected to the increasing preoccupation of the society with pre-reformation rituals, and the insistence on high-church forms such as long chancels, from which the laity were excluded, and stone altars. In 1841 he and others signed a remonstrance against the desire "to convert the Society into an engine of polemical theology" and resigned his position. Also in 1841, Willis designed his only complete building, a cemetery chapel in Wisbech. This was an early example of historically accurate gothic in England, and in this respect Willis was in agreement with the prescriptions of the Society. The Society, however, did not approve of the restoration of Ely Cathedral, for which Willis provided advice and drawings, including a design for a stone arcade for the communion table. George Peacock, Dean of Ely, was a reformer, and wished to open up the eastern part of the cathedral for the congregation. The Society's journal described the changes as 'desecration'.

Willis was an early member of the British Archaeological Association, and gave his paper on Canterbury Cathedral at their first meeting in 1844. Soon after this, the Association split, leading to the formation of the Archaeological Institute (later Royal). Willis transferred to the new Institute, giving his paper on Winchester Cathedral at their first meeting the following year. In 1849 a Royal Commission was set up to investigate the use of iron in railway structures. Willis was one of the commissioners, and carried out experiments to determine the effects of moving loads on iron structures. He was one of the jurors in the Great Exhibition of 1851, and his lecture On machines and tools for working in metal, wood and other materials was published in the following year. In 1855 he served as vice-president of the Paris Exposition, and in 1862 received the Royal Gold Medal in architecture.

=== Last years and posthumous publications ===
In 1870, his wife Mary Ann died. After completing work on the second edition of Principles of Mechanism in that year, Willis wrote no more. In 1872, he sold his library, which consisted of 1458 items. Pevsner (1970) lists some the books which included 26 editions of Vitruvius, works on Palmyra and on Chinese buildings, as well as those on German, French, Italian and British architecture. He died of bronchitis in 1875 at Cambridge, where his papers are archived at the Cambridge University Library. He willed his manuscript on the Architectural History of the University of Cambridge to his nephew John Willis Clark who completed it (published 1886). He was survived by four sons and one daughter.

The Cambridge History was Willis's magnum opus, even though it owes a great deal to his nephew. It extends to four volumes, the first three of which are each longer than any of his other published works. It includes detailed descriptions of each of the colleges, and of the main University buildings, as well as chapters on each of the main component parts of a college. As with his cathedral studies, he made extensive use of documentary material, including University and College statutes and account books. From such sources he was able to show that the early colleges did not initially have chapels, the students using the local parish church. This contradicted some Victorian beliefs as to the centrality of the chapel to college life. In architectural terms, he emphasised the relationship between Oxford and Cambridge colleges on the one hand and monastic foundations, and also similarities in the layouts of private houses. Willis used Haddon Hall in Derbyshire as an example. The Cambridge History remains current, having been re-published by the University Press in 1988.

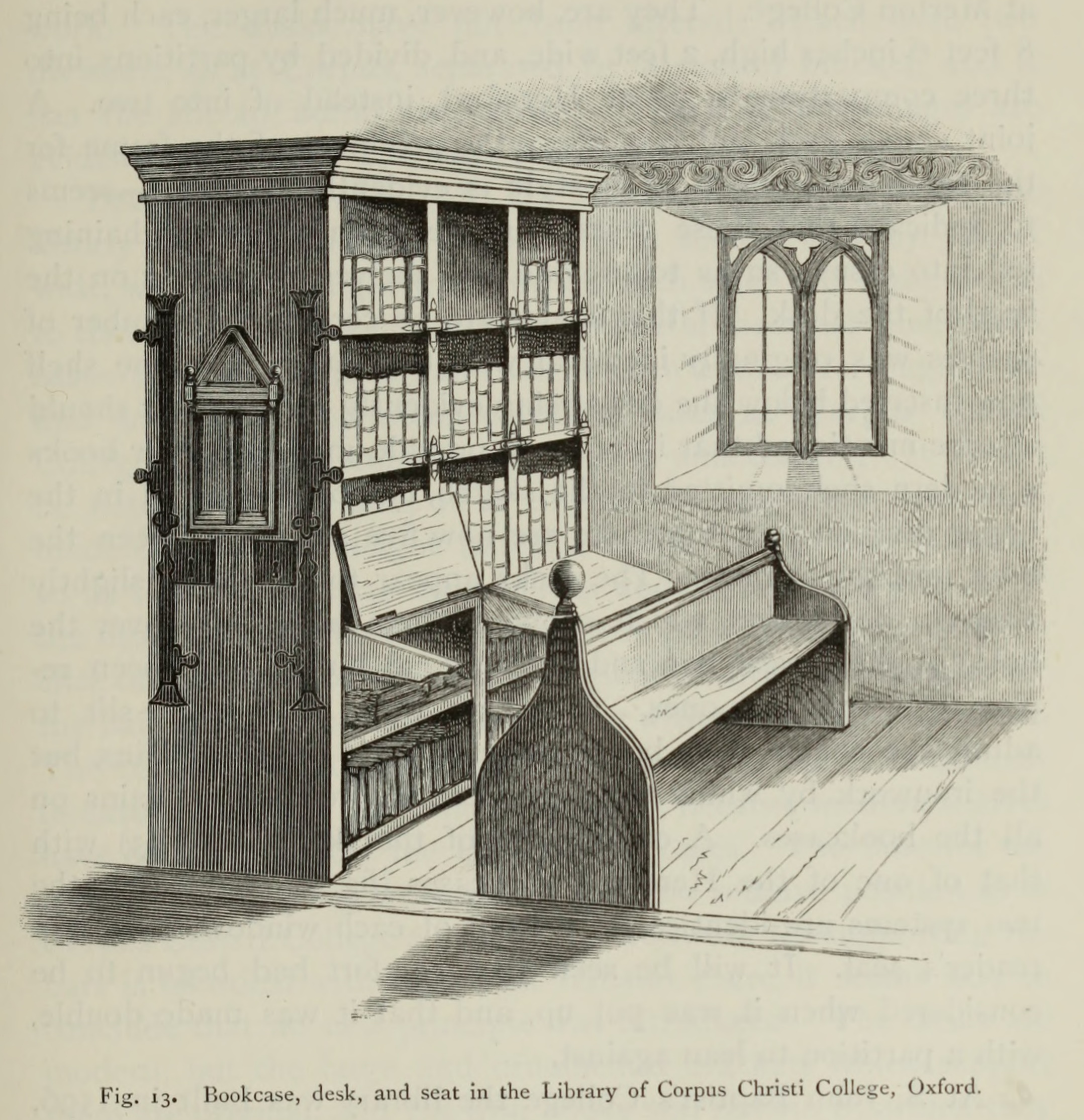
Corpus Christi College library

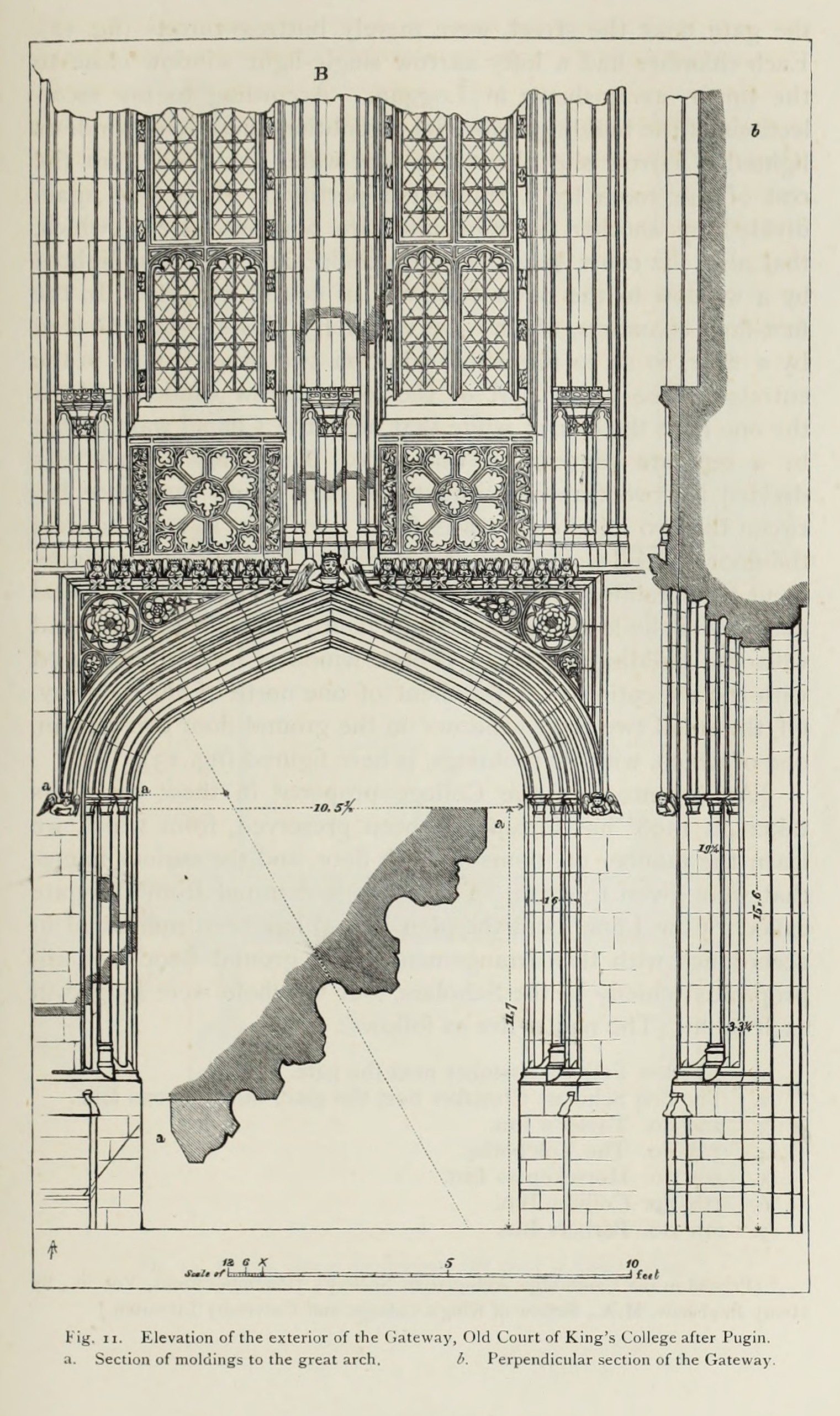
King's College Old Court Gateway

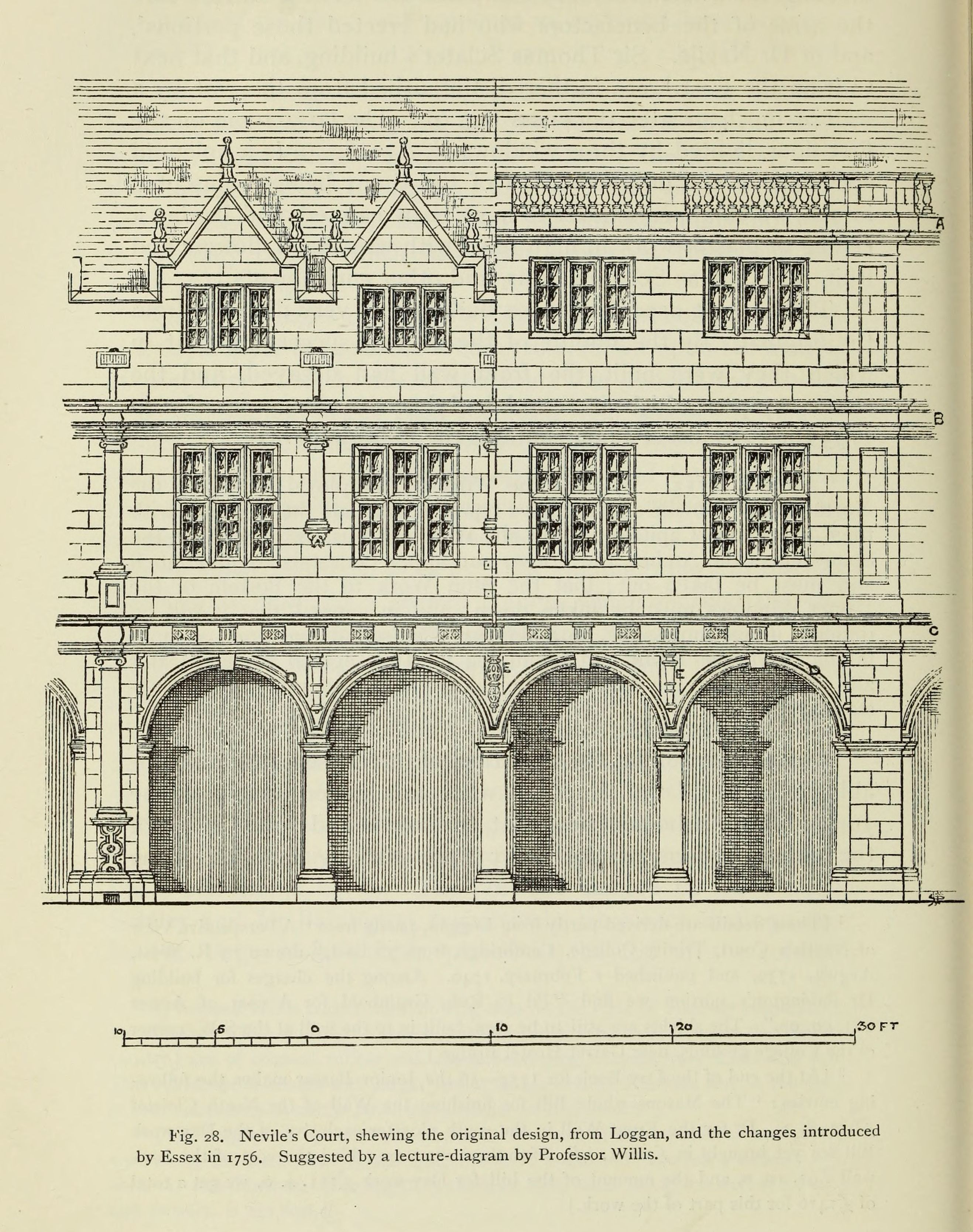
Nevile's Court, Trinity College

=== Legacy ===
Willis's theory of vowel production assumed a close correspondence between vowel production and the production of musical notes using an organ: the lung acted as a bellows, the vocal folds acted as the reed, and the mouth cavity acted as the organ pipe. Different vowels corresponded to mouth cavities(/organ pipes) of different lengths, which were independent of the properties or vibrations of the vocal folds(/reed). Willis's 1830 paper "On vowel sounds, and on reed-organ pipes" is usually given as the reference for this theory, and is often contrasted with Wheatstone's "harmonic" theory of vowel production. Russell devotes two chapters to the discussion of these two theories in his 1928 book on The Vowel, and Willis and Wheatstone figure prominently in the discussion of vowel theories given by Tsutomu Chiba and Masato Kajiyama.

Willis is now best-known for his architectural work. Pevsner, in a 1959 paper correcting an omission in Willis' account of Winchester Cathedral, writes: "His work was done a hundred and more years ago, and yet, whichever building or group of buildings he decided to tackle, his results have remained valid to this day. Nowhere has he been superseded to the extent that a scholar now could afford to neglect his writings". Bony (1983) writes that Willis's 1845 publication on Canterbury Cathedral "remains the fundamental monograph". More recently, Huerta describes Willis' work on vaults as "still today the best exposition of the topic, a work to be studied with care by anyone wishing to know in depth how the cross-vaults of the Middle Ages were traced and built". de Andrés and Álvarez (2015) have emphasised Willis' contribution to elucidating the flamboyant style, at a time when most historians were focusing either on the origins of the gothic style or on the central period of Chartres and Bourges. A comprehensive evaluation of Willis' life and his work on architectural history can be found in Buchanan (1994) and (2013), the latter being the only full-length monograph on Willis.

=== Confusion with Robert Willis (1799–1878) ===
The work of Willis on acoustics is often mistakenly attributed to Robert Willis (1799–1878). This is for instance the case in Beyer's Sounds of Our Times (1998). Sometimes, it is the other way round, and Thierry Mandoul's Entre raison et utopie: l'Histoire de l'architecture d'Auguste Choisy (2008) gives the dates (1799–1878) for our Willis who worked in architecture.

== Bibliography ==
- Willis, Robert (1821). An Attempt to Analyse the Automaton Chess Player, of Mr. de Kempelen ... to which is Added, a ... Collection of the Knight's Moves Over the Chess Board. London: Booth.
  - —— (1830a). "On the pressure produced on a flat plate when opposed to a stream of air issuing from an orifice in a plane surface". Transactions of the Cambridge Philosophical Society. 3: 129–140.
  - —— (1830b). "On vowel sounds, and on reed organ pipes". Transactions of the Cambridge Philosophical Society. 3: 231–268.
  - —— (1833). "On the mechanism of the larynx". Transactions of the Cambridge Philosophical Society. 4: 323–352.
  - —— (1835). Remarks on the architecture of the middle ages, especially of Italy. Cambridge: J & J.J. Deighton.
  - —— (1838). "On the teeth of wheels". Transactions of the Institution of Civil Engineers. 2: 89–112. doi:10.1680/itrcs.1838.24389.
  - —— (1841). Principles of Mechanism. London: John W. Parker.
  - —— (1842a). "On the Construction of the Vaults of the Middle Ages". Transactions of the Royal Institute of British Architects (1910 reprint).
  - —— (1842b). "On the characteristic interpenetrations of the flamboyant style". Transactions of the Royal Institute of British Architects of London. I: 81–87.
  - —— (1842c). "Description of the Cymagraph for Copying Mouldings" (PDF). Civil Engineer and Architects' Journal. 5: 219–221.
  - —— (1842d). Report of a Survey of the Dilapidated Portions of Hereford Cathedral in the Year 1841 (PDF). Dean and Chapter of Hereford Cathedral.
  - —— (1843). "A description of the Sextry Barn at Ely, lately demolished". Publications of the Cambridge Antiquarian Society. 1 (7).
  - —— (1844). Architectural Nomenclature of the Middle Ages (PDF). Cambridge: J. & JJ Deighton, and T. Stevenson.
  - —— (1845a). The Architectural History of Canterbury Cathedral. London: Longman.
  - —— (1845b). "On the History of the Great Seals of England, especially those of Edward III". Archaeological Journal. 2: 14–41 – via Wikisource.
  - —— (1846). "The architectural history of Winchester Cathedral" (PDF). Proceedings at the Annual Meeting of the Archaeological Institute of Great Britain and Ireland.
  - —— (1848). "Description of the Ancient Plan of the Monastery of St. Gall, in the Ninth Century". Archaeological Journal. 5: 85–117. doi:10.1080/00665983.1848.10850686.
  - —— (1851). A System of Apparatus for the use of Lecturers and Experimenters in Mechanical Philosophy (PDF). London: J. Weale.
  - —— (1852). On Machines and Tools for Working in Metal, Wood, and Other Materials (PDF). London: D. Bogue.
  - —— (1859). Facsimile of the sketch-book of Wilars de Honecort, an architect of the thirteenth century : illustrated by commentaries and descriptions. London: John Henry and James Parker.
  - —— (1861). The architectural history of Chichester Cathedral. Chichester: William Hayley Mason.
  - —— (1863). "The Architectural History of the Cathedral and Monastery at Worcester". Archaeological Journal. 20: 83–132, 254–272, 301–318. doi:10.1080/00665983.1863.10851243.
  - —— (1865). "The architectural history of Sherborne Minster". Archaeological Journal. 22: 179–199. doi:10.1080/00665983.1865.10851315.
  - —— (1866). The architectural history of Glastonbury Abbey. Cambridge: Deighton, Bell, and Co.
  - —— (1868). "The Architectural History of the Conventual Buildings of the Monastery of Christ Church in Canterbury". Archaeologia Cantiana. 7: 1–206. Published as a book in 1869.
  - —— (1870). Principles of Mechanism, Second Edition. London: Longmans, Green. (contains after p. 463 a list of Willis' publications up to 1870 and these include the works on the chess player, and the articles on vowel sounds and the larynx)
  - —— (1886). The Architectural History of the University of Cambridge, and of the Colleges of Cambridge and Eton. Cambridge University Press. Volume 1; Volume 2; Volume 3; Volume 4.

Academic offices
Preceded by William Farish	Jacksonian Professor of Natural Philosophy; 1837–1875	Succeeded by James Dewar
