= John Willis Clark =

English academic and antiquarian (1833–1910)

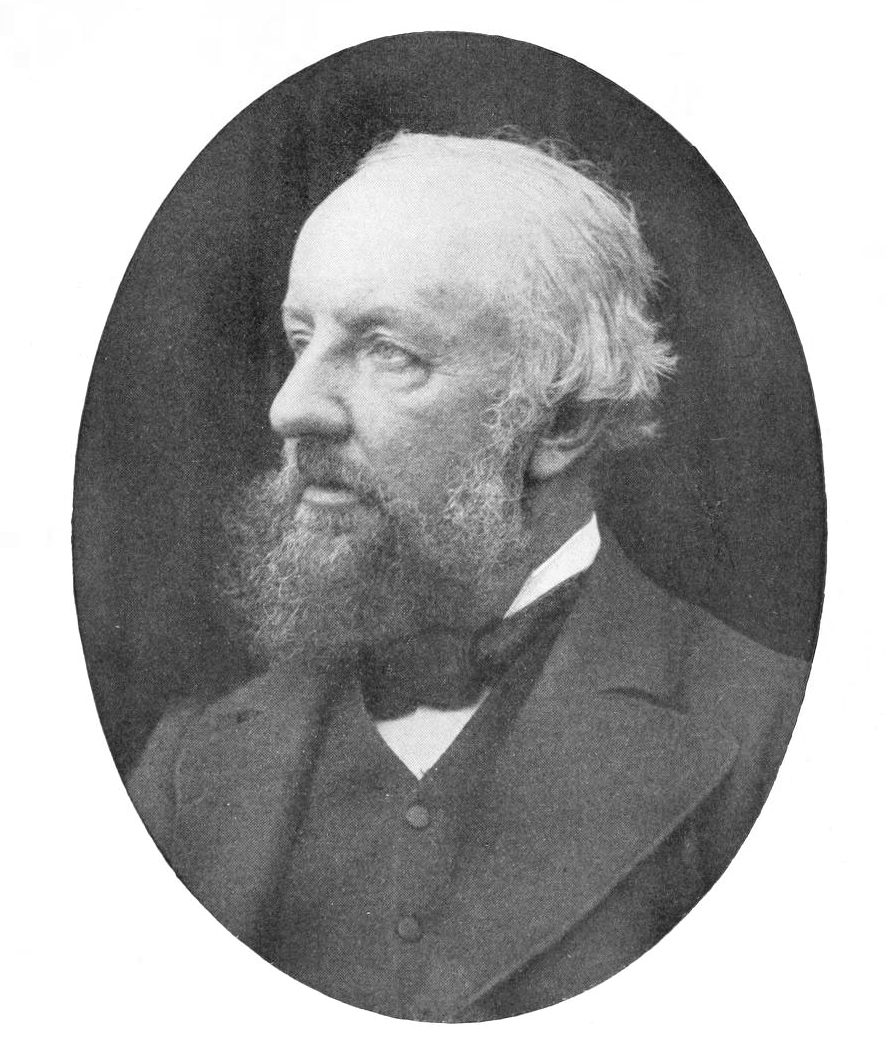
John Willis Clark, ca. 1880, photographed by A. G. Dew-Smith

John Willis Clark (1833 – 1910), sometimes J. W. Clark, was an English academic and antiquarian.

== Academic career ==
Clark was born into a Cambridge University academic family, and was a nephew of Prof. Robert Willis. Educated at Eton and Trinity College, Cambridge, he spent his life at the university, serving as Fellow of Trinity, Superintendent of the Cambridge University Museum of Zoology from 1866 to 1892, and Registrary of the university. He was also Secretary of the Cambridge Antiquarian Society.

He received the honorary degree Doctor of Letters (D.Litt.) from the University of Oxford in October 1902, in connection with the tercentenary of the Bodleian Library.

In 1899 he held the Sandars Readership in Bibliography titled "the Care of Books."

Clark died in 1910, and is buried in the Mill Road cemetery, Cambridge.

His son was Sir William Henry Clark.

== Works ==
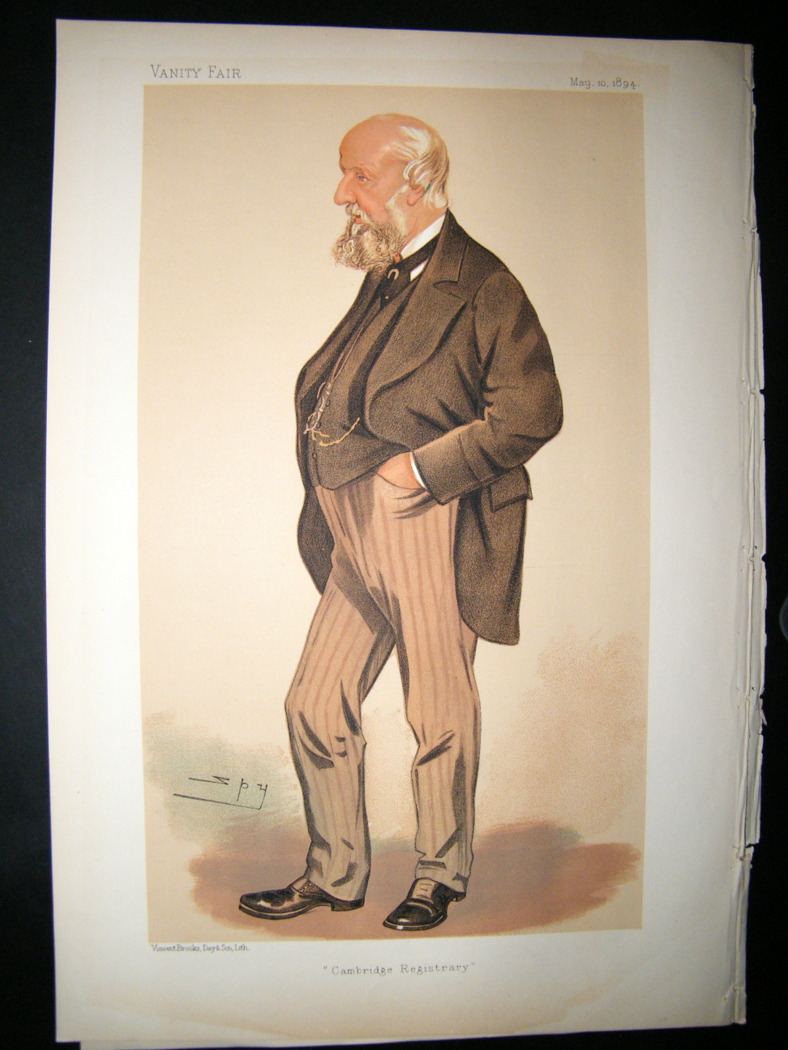
"Cambridge Registrary". Caricature of Mr JW Clark MA. by Spy published in Vanity Fair in 1894.

- Architectural History of the University and Colleges of Cambridge, with Robert Willis, 4 volumes, 1886.
- The Life and Letters of The Reverend Adam Sedgwick (1890) in 2 volumes
- Libraries in the Medieval and Renaissance Periods (1894)
- The observances in use at The Augustinian Priory of S. Giles : and S. Andrew at Barnwell, Cambridgeshire (1897)
- On the Vatican Library of Sixtus IV (1899)
- A descriptive catalogue of the manuscripts in the library of Peterhouse (1899)
- Old friends at Cambridge and elsewhere (1900)
- The Care of Books (1901)
- Cambridge; a concise guide to the town & university in an introduction and four walks (2nd edition, 1902); (1st edition, 1898)
- Endowments of the University of Cambridge (1904)
- Cambridge (1908)

=== Contributions to the DNB ===
- James Burrough
- William Clark
- Nicholas Close
- John Dawson (surgeon) (1734–1820)
- Philip Douglas
- James Essex
- Richard Harraden
- Joseph Jowett
- David Loggan
- Henry Richards Luard
- Isaac Milner
- John Montagu (Trinity) (1655?–1728)
- George Peacock (1791–1858)
- George Phillips (canon lawyer) (1804–1892)
- Robert Plumptre
- Thomas Postlethwaite
- Joseph Power
- George Pryme
- Connop Thirlwall
- William Hepworth Thompson
- Francis Willis
- Robert Willis (engineer) (1800–1875)
- Francis John Hyde Wollaston
- Christopher Wordsworth (1774–1846)

== Works about Clark ==
- "John Willis Clark", Obituary, The Times, 1910
