= Admiral Willis =

Admiral Willis may refer to:

- Algernon Willis (1889–1976), British Royal Navy admiral
- James Willis (admiral) (1923–2003), Royal Australian Navy vice admiral
- Richard Willis (Royal Navy officer) (1755–1829), British Royal Navy rear admiral
