= John Edward Carew =

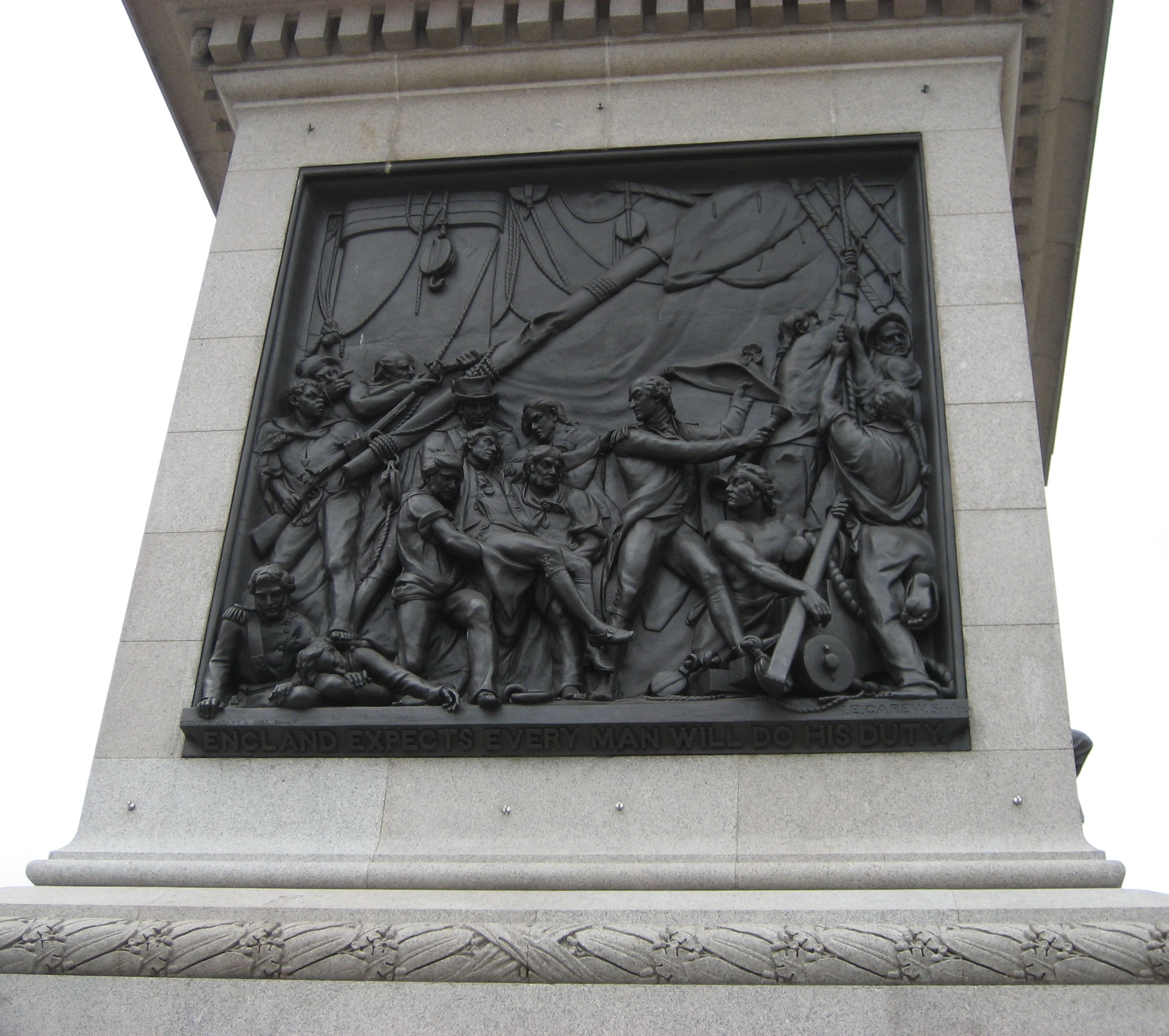
The Death of Nelson, by John Edward Carew, at the foot of Nelson's Column

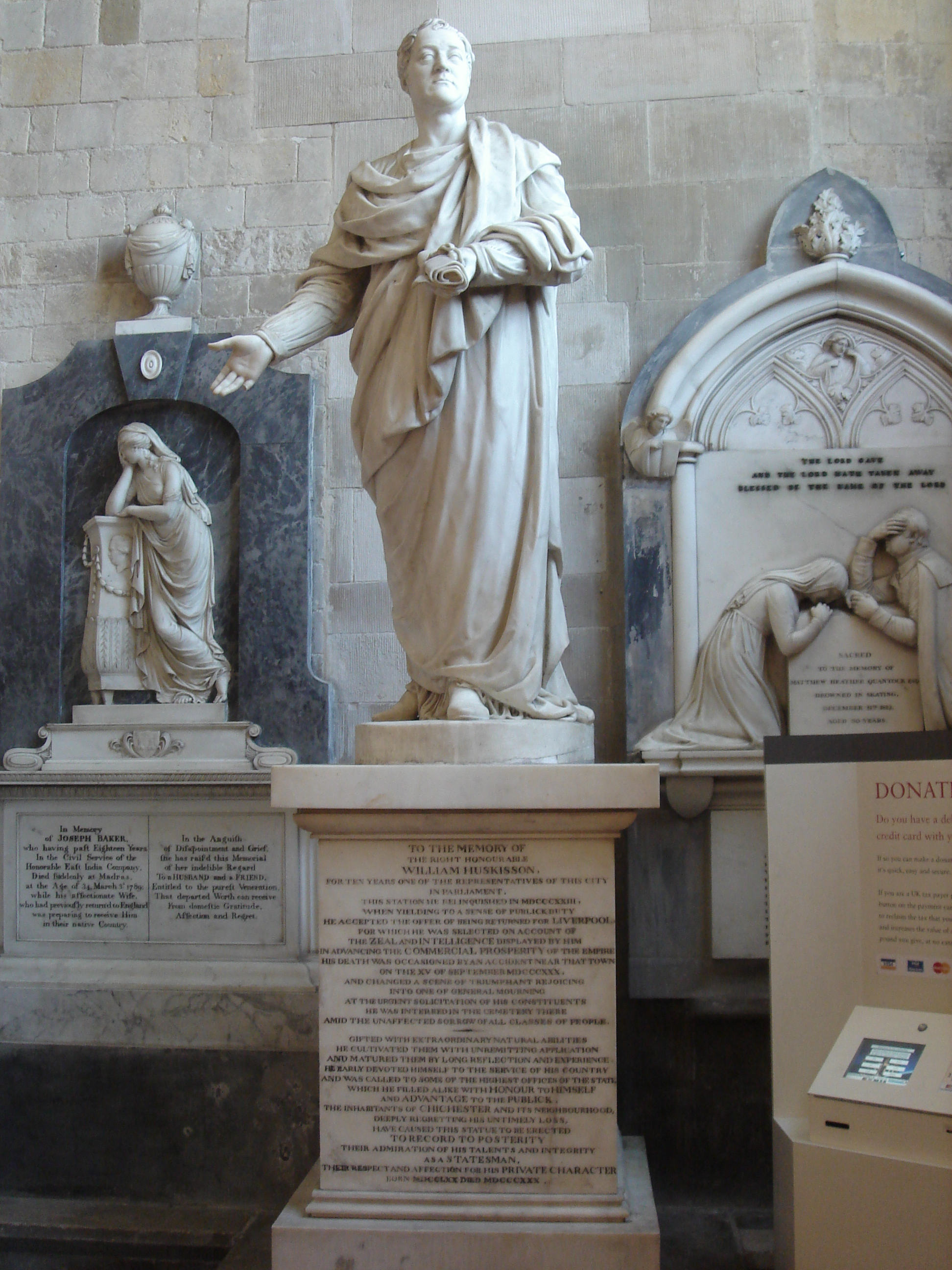
William Huskisson in Chichester Cathedral

John Edward Carew (c. 1782 – 1 December 1868) was an Irish sculptor during the 19th century. His most prominent work is The Death of Nelson, one of the four bronze panels on the pedestal of Nelson's Column in Trafalgar Square.

== Life ==
Thought to be the son of a local stonemason and sculptor, Carew was born in Tramore near Waterford on the southern Irish coast. He studied art in Dublin. Around 1809, he came to London to work for Sir Richard Westmacott. For part of the time which he worked with Westmacott he also had his own studio in the Edgware Road.

In 1831 he moved to a studio in Brighton, to be nearer Petworth House, home of George Wyndham, 3rd Earl of Egremont who was his main patron from the mid-1820s until the earl's death in 1837. Carew later moved to Grove House near Petworth.

When Lord Egremont died leaving no provision for him in his will, the sculptor sued the Earl's executors for £50,000. Ten thousand pounds of this was for "loss of time in the attendance on the late Lord Egremont". Carew claimed that he had not been properly paid for the sculptures made for Petworth, and that he had sacrificed commercial success by moving to Sussex to be near the earl. The defence produced evidence that Carew had been generously paid, at least £20,000 for completed works, and that Lord Egremont had done all he could to promote Carew's reputation. Carew's counsel withdrew the case. Carew was declared bankrupt in 1842.

Petworth still has a superb collection of Carew's work in marble, including the neo-classical mythological subjects Arethusa (1823), Adonis and the Boar (1826), The Falconer (1831) and Prometheus and Pandora (1838), and a series of busts, among them a portrait of Egremont (1831). He also produced a monument to the Earl's Percy ancestors in the baptistry of St Mary's, Petworth.

In the years following the court case, Carew received several prominent public commissions, including the Royal Arms and the statue of Richard Whittington for the façade of the Royal Exchange (1844), and a statue of Henry Grattan for St Stephen's Hall in the Palace of Westminster (1857). He was selected to make the bronze relief of the death of Nelson, for the pedestal of Nelson's Column; it was installed in December 1849. For the Catholic cathedral at St John's, Newfoundland, Carew executed several statues and an elaborate altarpiece.

Carew exhibited at the Royal Academy between 1812 until 1848 when his eyesight began to fail. He was buried in Kensal Green Cemetery.

== Works ==
- Bust of Lord Thurlow (1820)
- Two chimneypieces for Buckingham Palace (1829)
- Bust of Lord John Townshend in Woburn Abbey (1831)
- Statue of William Huskisson in Chichester Cathedral (1832)
- Bust of Captain Marryat RN (1834)
- Statue of Henry Grattan in St Stephen's Hall, Houses of Parliament (1844)
- Statue of Edmund Kean for the Drury Lane Theatre (1833)
- Statue of Sir Richard Whittington for the Royal Exchange, London, (1844)
- Bust of Lady Georgiana Fane (1846)
- Statue of John Curran in Westminster Palace (1856)

Church work includes:

- Memorial of General Sir John Floyd in St James' Church, Hampstead Road (1818)
- Memorial to Henry Hoare of Mitcham Grove in Moredun, Surrey (1828)
- Memorial to Rear Admiral Richard Willis in Petworth Parish Church (1829)
- Memorial to Edmund Woods in Chichester Cathedral (1834)
- Memorial to the Percy family of Petworth House in Petworth Parish Church (1837)
- Memorial to Sir Henry Tichborne in Tichborne (1845)
- Memorial to Michael Nugent in Kensal Green Cemetery (1846)
- Memorial to the Duke of Northumberland in Alnwick (1847)
- Monument with figures to Sir Thomas Caryll, St Mary's Church, Shipley, Sussex (1831)
- Baptism of Christ for St John the Baptist's Church, Brighton (1835)
- Reredos in the Church of Our Lady of the Assumption and St Gregory, London (1853)
- Four works – statue of St. John the Baptist, the Immaculate Conception (erected 1858), St Francis of Assisi and St. Patrick – in Basilica of St. John the Baptist, St. John's, Newfoundland

== Bibliography ==
- Wroth, Warwick William (1887). "Carew, John Edward" . In Stephen, Leslie (ed.). Dictionary of National Biography. Vol. 9. London: Smith, Elder & Co.
- Carew, John Edward (1840). Report on the trial of the cause Carew against Burrell, Bt. and another, executors of the late Earl of Egremont at the Sussex Spring Assizes, held at Lewes on Wednesday March 18th, 1840, before Mr Justice Littledale and a special jury; taken in shorthand by Mr Cooke. London.
