= Lady Georgiana Fane =

English heiress

Lady Georgina Fane
- Born: Lady Cecily Jane Georgiana Fane; 25 January 1801; Apethorpe Hall, Northamptonshire
- Died: 4 December 1874 (aged 73); Mayfair, London, England
- Occupation: Heiress
- Known for: Pursuit of the Duke of Wellington

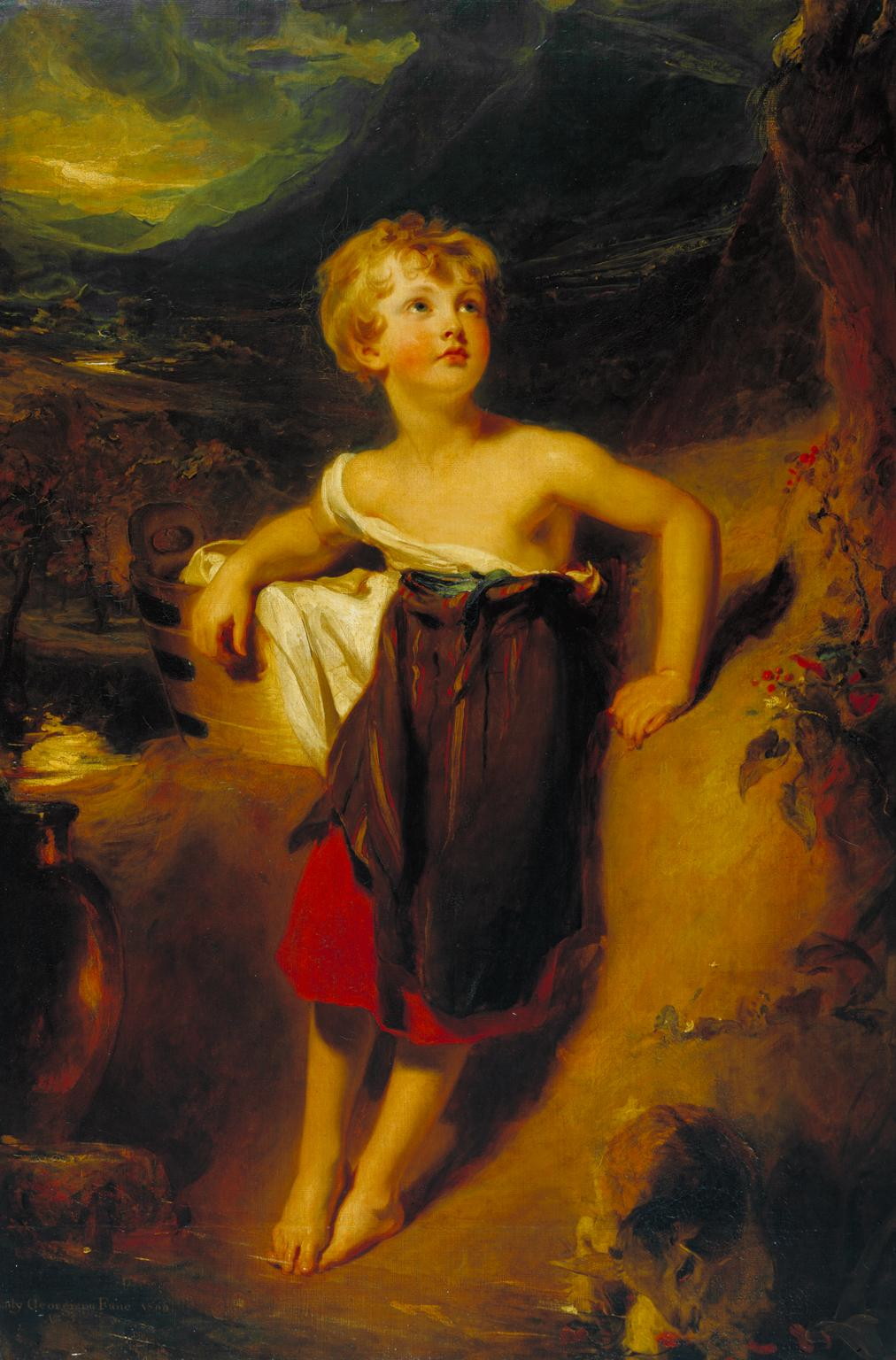
This portrait, by Thomas Lawrence, of Lady Georgiana Fane, as a peasant girl, is described as a good example of a trend in painting to represent the rich in fantastic scenes, as individuals from mythology, classical literature, or simple peasants.

Lady Cecily Jane Georgiana Fane (25 January 1801 – 4 December 1874) was an English heiress from the Fane family. She was the daughter of John Fane, 10th Earl of Westmorland and his second wife the former Jane Huck-Saunders. Her mother bore four other children before separating from her father, after ten years of marriage.

Lady Georgiana is known for two things, a much commented upon portrait of her, when she was five or six years old, dressed as a peasant girl, and for her apparent stalking of the Duke of Wellington.

She met Wellington in 1815, shortly after his final victory over Napoleon Bonaparte at the Battle of Waterloo; she was 14 years old, and he was 47.

Lord Palmerston, who was carrying on an affair with her married half-sister, Sarah Villiers, Countess of Jersey, proposed to Lady Georgiana, twice, in 1823, but she turned him down.

The existence of suggestive letters, from Wellington, seems to confirm they did have a sexual relationship in the 1820s. After his wife, the former Kitty Pakenham, died in 1830, Lady Georgiana, and several other women intensified their interest in Wellington, hoping to become his second wife. She could not accept his rejection of her, and harassed him for the rest of his life.

In 1846, she was sculpted by John Edward Carew.

She died at 5 Upper Brook Street, in Mayfair, London, aged 73.
