= Richard Child Willis =

English clergyman

Personal information
- Full name: Richard Child Willis
- Born: England
- Died: 27 January 1877; Isle of Sheppey, Kent, England
- Batting: Unknown

Domestic team information
- Years: Team
- 1829: Sussex

Career statistics
Competition	First-class
Matches	1
Runs scored	6
Batting average	3.00
100s/50s	–/–
Top score	4
Balls bowled	–
Wickets	–
Bowling average	–
5 wickets in innings	–
10 wickets in match	–
Best bowling	–
Catches/stumpings	1/–
- Source: Cricinfo, 19 December 2011

Richard Child Willis (4 March 1799 – 27 January 1877) was an English clergyman and first-class cricketer.

== Early life and education ==
Richard Child Willis was born at Petworth in Sussex, third and only surviving child of Admiral Richard Willis and his wife Ann, daughter of Captain William Child, of the King's Light Dragoons. He was a student at University College, Oxford (BA 1822, MA 1824).

== Clerical career ==
On 31 March 1822 he was ordained Deacon at St. George's, Hanover Square by the Bishop of Ely, and the next day (1 April 1822) he was appointed curate at Albourne and at Twineham, both in Sussex. He was ordained priest in the Chapel of St Marylebone by the Bishop of Lincoln on 9 March 1823, and then appointed perpetual curate of North Stoke, Sussex on 26 March 1823.

In 1840, Willis became a grand compounder (DD) of the University of Oxford. In 1842, Willis wrote to the Bishop of Lincoln for permission to act as a curate for his cousin, Rev. John Willis, in Buckinghamshire. However, a week later, the Bishop received an anonymous letter advising him to "suspend granting" Willis the curacy until having "communicated with the Bishop of Exeter, the Rector of Falmouth, and the Vicar of Toller in Dorsetshire, the two last Incumbents, with whom he officiated as curate". The Rector of Falmouth reported that Willis "served my curacy for several months on trial and that trial was not satisfactory and we parted." Willis was however licensed, despite misgivings, and was successful in his work. It was reported that he "behaved himself in a very becoming and promise worthy manner", was "much beloved by the Parishioners", and was "thought a fine preacher". In October 1845, Willis was licensed to the Rectory of Warden, on the Isle of Sheppey in Kent. Two years later he was also licensed to the perpetual curacy of the nearby parish of Minster in Sheppey, and he would hold both livings until his death. Holding two livings required a dispensation from the Archbishop of Canterbury, but as the population of Warden was a mere 27 Willis was probably coping. Willis's finances were in poor condition; because his living was poor, he was entitled to money from Queen Anne's Bounty, and got into the habit of promising it to people. Unfortunately, he promised it to more than one person at a time, so that although the first person to turn up at the Queens Anne's bounty office with Willis's receipt might get paid, the subsequent ones didn't. He first did this in 1848; on 11 April 1849 he did it again, having gone "to Hatchett's Hotel, Piccadilly, and having run up a bill of 3l. 3s. 6d., he gave a cheque for 14l. 13s. 1d., and being known as a customer of the house, no suspicion was entertained, and the difference was handed over to him, the cheque, as in the other cases, turning out to be of no value." On 9 April 1850 he was found guilty at the Old Bailey of obtaining money upon false pretences. For this he was sentenced to one year's hard labour.

In 1864, Richard Child Willis was reported to be the Curate of St Luke's, Baldwin, Isle of Man. The Archbishop of Canterbury, however, subsequently refused to sanction his appointment. In 1872 he was declared bankrupt. He was presented to the vacant Buckinghamshire living of Drayton Parslow (worth £477) by a friend in 1876. The Bishop of Oxford, however, refused to institute him, on the basis that Willis was "non idoneus et minus sufficiens in literatura"- not fit and insufficiently learned. Willis responded by asking on what grounds was he not sufficiently learned, as a Doctor of Divinity of Oxford University; the Bishop said that he did not have to give grounds, because his judgement as a Bishop was final. The Court of Arches decided that the Bishop was required to explain his reasoning;

Willis died on 27 January 1877 whilst this dispute continued. His obituary in the local paper makes clear the affection in which he was held: "during these last ten years the Rev. Dr. Willis has been vicar of Minster, and well known for his able ministry and preaching. That he was beloved by all who knew him, and by his parishioners, and generally respected, we can testify; assiduous in his duties, his Church was never neglected, and he won the favourable opinion of all classes. To the poor he was ever considerate and kind, and was most respectfully treated by the Archbishop of his diocese (Canterbury). His urbanity, his eloquence as a preacher, and his finished elocution as a reader, drew numbers of people to hear him. Sunday after Sunday many persons from Sheerness wended their way to Minster for the express purpose of listening to the excellent and scholarly discourses of the venerable doctor. In summer the people literally flocked to hear him, so universal was his fame. We sincerely believe that he always lived as he has died, "in peace and harmony with all men," his dying words. It is thought that the worry caused by the litigation brought about by the Bishop of Oxford had a very depressing effect on Dr. Willis, and on the whole hastened his death. Sic itur ad astra." His churchwarden went so far as to make a sworn statement to the Court of Arches: "The discussions which have taken place in this Court on the pleadings in this suit reports of which have appeared in the Public papers have I believe tended to do injustice to the memory of the late Vicar".

== Cricket ==
While living at Petworth, Willis played a single game of cricket for a Sussex XI, scoring 2 and 4 vs. England at Lords on 13–15 July 1829. England were dismissed for 248 runs in their first-innings, while in response Sussex were dismissed for just 48, with Willis being dismissed for 4 by James Burt. England were dismissed for 88 in their second-innings, leaving Sussex a target of 189 to chase. Sussex could only make 124 in their chase, with Willis being run out for 2.

== Personal life ==
In 1826, Willis married Frances, youngest daughter of William Hale, of Petworth, Sussex. In 1835, at his mother's death, Willis inherited his maternal grandfather's property, Ravenhill (also known as Peak House and Raven Hall), near Staintondale. He and his wife were subsequently separated.
