= Richard H. Willis =

American economist

Richard H. Willis is an American economist, currently the Anne Marie and Thomas B. Walker Jr. Professor of Accounting at Owen Graduate School of Management, Vanderbilt University.
