= Richard Willis (publicist and agent) =

1913 publicity photo from Moving Picture World.

Richard Willis (October 15, 1876 - April 8, 1945) was a publicist, agent, general manager, screenwriter, scenario editor, actor and poet. By 1912 he was scenario editor for the Nestor Motion Picture Company in Los Angeles. When Nestor merged into Universal, Willis became scenario editor for Universal. He left Universal in 1913 and joined with W. A. (Gus) Inglis to found Willis & Inglis, an agency offering publicity, representation, management and bookings within the motion picture industry. Willis & Inglis later claimed they were "the first to do personal publicity for the photoplayers in the west" and "the first agency on the west coast to become established as an institution negotiating business between producers and artists." Among the many screen artists represented by Willis & Inglis were actors Mary Pickford, John Gilbert, Charles Ray, Norma Talmadge, Lon Chaney Sr., and directors D. W. Griffith, Henry King, Frank Borzage, and William Desmond Taylor. During 1914-1917 Richard Willis wrote columns and articles published in the New York Clipper, Photoplay, Movie Pictorial, Motion Picture Magazine, and other publications, sometimes writing under the name Dick Willis, Dick Melbourne, or Wil. In 1917, Willis & Inglis bought the old Kalem Studio at 1425 Fleming St., Los Angeles, and produced several Fay Tincher comedies for World Film Company, then leased the studio to producer Jesse D. Hampton. In 1920 the studio was taken over by Charles Ray Productions, with Richard Willis as Vice-President and General Manager. Willis also served as treasurer of the Photoplay Authors League and the Screen Writers Guild. He died in Los Angeles on April 8, 1945.
