= Richard Willis (Royal Navy officer) =

Royal Navy officer

Rear-Admiral Richard Willis (1755–1829) was a late 18th century and early 19th century Royal Navy commander perhaps best remembered as a member of the Willis family who, having cured George III of his madness, thereafter spent much time in royal circles.

== Life ==
He was born in Dunston, Lincolnshire on 7 May 1755, the fourth child of Rev Dr Francis Willis (a noted minister and physician) and his wife, Mary Curtois. His father later became famous in England as the physician tending George III during his "madness".

In March 1778 he joined the Royal Navy and in October was promoted to Lieutenant. In November 1783 he joined the new HMS Speedwell, a small 16-gunner as its Commander. They were put to service off the Isle of Arran working for the Excise, patrolling for smugglers.

From July 1787 until May 1790, he had a period of extended leave from Navy service. The reason is not clear.

In May 1790 he returned to service as Commander of the tiny HMS Swan, again working for the Excise looking for smugglers. After a three-month break (August to November 1790) he joined HMS Andromache which had seen action in the Battle of the Saintes. This was at the rank of Captain and Commander. However, he stayed with the ship less than a month. He appears to have then gone travelling with his father, who was by then a celebrity. He returned with his father to England from Portugal on 24 August 1792 at Plymouth staying at the King's Arms before travelling together to see and stay with George III.

Following the King's relapse in 1801 it was Richard's brothers, John Willis and Robert Darling Willis, both physicians, who treated the King. Richard seems to have thereafter shadowed them to some degree to bask in the "family glory". His official role in the Royal Navy was Port Admiral of Portsmouth but he lived in Petworth.

He was officially retired from the Royal Navy in June 1808 and given the rank of Rear Admiral.

He died on 29 January 1829. His grave in Petworth Parish Church was sculpted by John Edward Carew.

== Family ==
Richard was uncle of the engineer Robert Willis.

In 1793 Richard married Ann Child (d.1837) in St James' Church in Piccadilly. They had a son in 1794 named Richard Child Willis. In 1799 a second son was born and again named Richard Child Willis, described as their third and only surviving son who went to Oxford University and became a priest like his grandfather.
