= Francis Willis (physician) =

English physician (1718–1807)

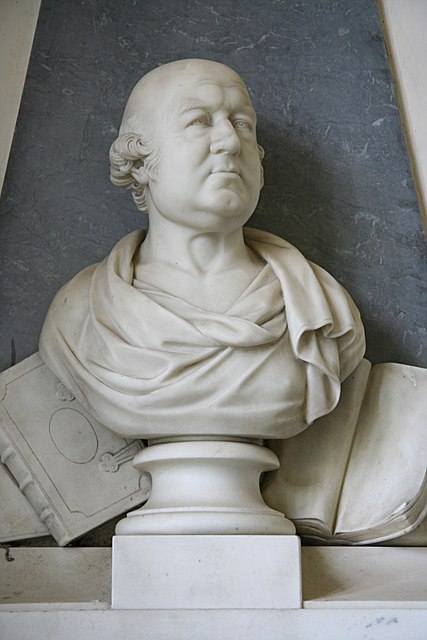
- The Nollekens bust of Willis in the church at Greatford
- Born: 17 August 1718
- Died: 5 December 1807 (aged 89); Bourne, Lincolnshire
- Known for: Pioneering work in the field of mental health and his treatment of George III
- Scientific career
- Fields: Psychiatry

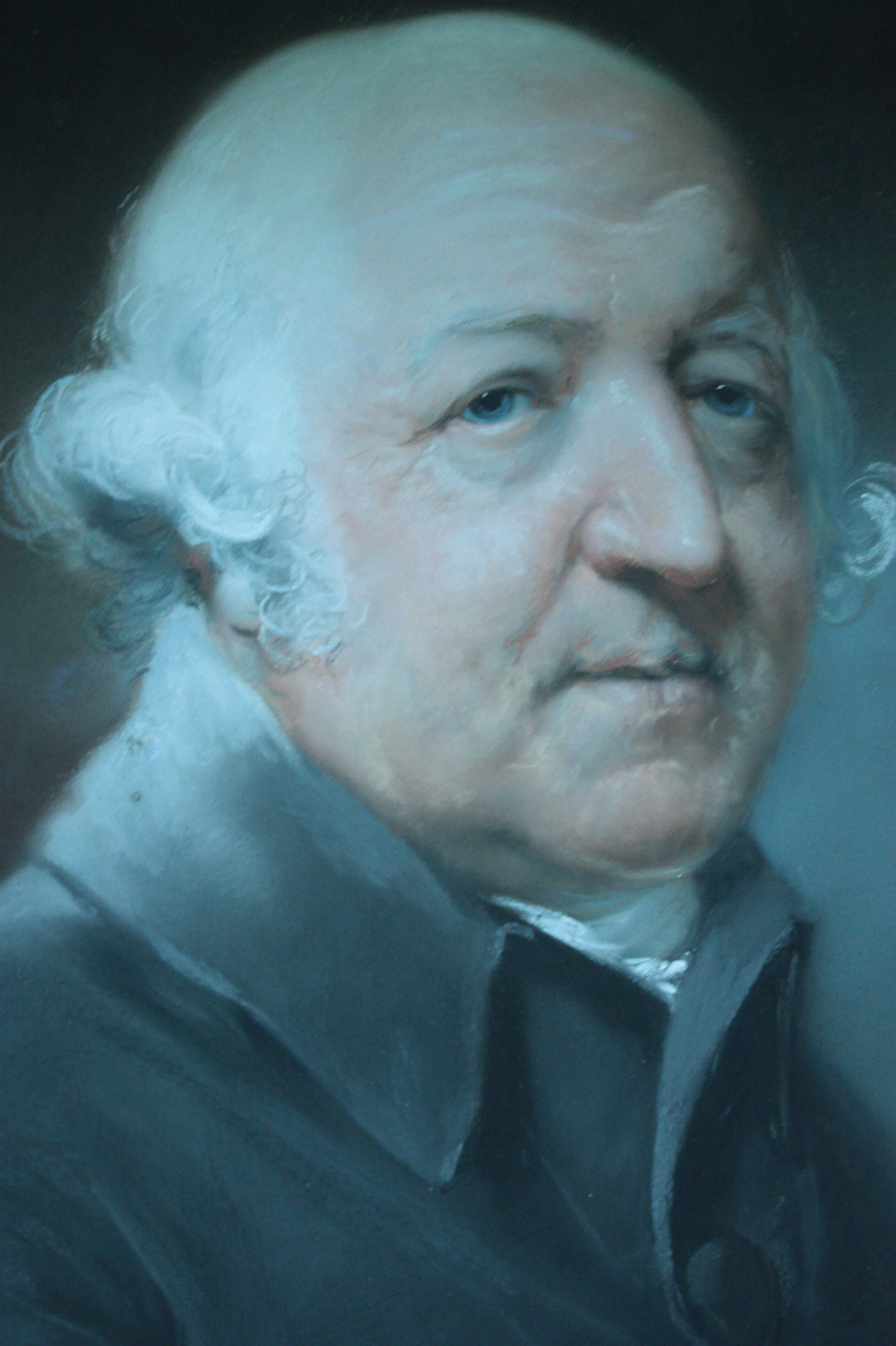
Dr Francis Willis (detail) by John Russell, 1789, National Gallery, London

Francis Willis (17 August 1718 – 5 December 1807) was an English physician and clergyman best known for his treatment of King George III of Great Britain and Queen Maria I of Portugal.

== Early career ==
Willis was the third son of the Rev. John Willis of Lincoln. He claimed to be a descendant of the Willis family of Fenny Compton, Warwickshire, a kinsman of the George Wyllys who became Governor of Connecticut, New England, and the Willis baronets of Fen Ditton, Cambridgeshire.

After an undergraduate career at Lincoln College, Oxford and St Alban Hall he was elected a Fellow of Brasenose College, Oxford in 1740 and was ordained as a priest. Willis was Rector of the college living of Wapping 1748–1750. He resigned his Fellowship in 1750, as he was required to do on his marriage, and he and his wife took up residence at Dunston, Lincolnshire, where he looked after the local interests of Sir Francis Dashwood whilst apparently practising medicine. In 1755 he published 'The Case of a Shepherd near Lincoln' in the London Gazette, and in 1760 'An account of an extraordinary Case of a Lady who Swallowed Euphorbium'.

== Willis the physician ==
Although Willis was ordained in accordance with his father's wishes, his chief interest was in medicine and he received the degrees of Bachelor and Doctor of Medicine from Oxford in 1759 before serving as a hospital physician in Lincoln, where his early successes with the mentally ill, or "wrongheads" as they were commonly known at the time, led to him treating such patients in his own home:

It is said that the great success that attended the eminent Dr Willis had its origin in an experiment tried upon a tradesman of Lincoln, who on becoming insane was taken to Dunston, where the treatment of his malady was such that in a short time he was enabled to return to this city and resume his duties behind the counter.

In 1776, Willis moved to Greatford Hall, near Bourne, Lincolnshire, which he developed as a private rural sanitorium. As part of the treatments his patients were encouraged to perform manual work in and around the stables and fields of the Greatford estate, the fresh air and exercise likely contributing to their recovery. On visiting the estate in 1796, Frederick Reynolds recorded:

As the unprepared traveller approached the town, he was astonished to find almost all the surrounding ploughmen, gardeners, threshers, thatchers and other labourers attired in black coats, white waistcoats, black silk breaches and stockings, and the head of each "bewigged, well powdered, neat and arranged.

These were the doctor's patients with dress, neatness of person, and exercise being a principle feature of his admirable treatment system where health and cheerfulness conjoined to aid recovery of every person attached to that most valuable asylum.

== Family ==
Dr Willis married Mary Curtois and their children included Rear Admiral Richard Willis.

== Treating the King ==
George III had his first attack of madness, possibly attributable to porphyria, which could have been triggered by an excess of rich wines, or more likely an over exposure to the arsenic related to the elaborate hats commonly worn in the Georgian period (though this diagnosis has been challenged, with various other causes being put forward, such as bipolar disorder). The court physicians were baffled by the symptoms and failed to treat the King successfully. In 1788 Willis was recommended to the increasingly concerned Queen Consort by an equerry's wife, whose mother Willis had treated successfully.

Willis's treatment of the King at The White House, Kew, included many of the standard methods of the period, including coercion, restraint in a strait jacket and blistering of the skin, but there was also more kindness and consideration for the patient than was then the norm.

When on 26 February 1789 Willis's bulletin described the "entire cessation of his Majesty's illness" he became a British celebrity and was soon recognised through five portraits by John Russell, one of the most renowned portrait painters of the day. Willis commissioned a special medal to commemorate his own achievements. The Reverend Doctor Francis Willis was rewarded by the King with £1,500 a year for 21 years and assistant and son Dr John Willis with £650 a year for the rest of his life. The King's recovery made Willis's national reputation and he had to open a second establishment at nearby Shillingthorpe Hall (in the parish of Braceborough) to accommodate the numbers of patients seeking his help. Shillingthorpe Hall was demolished in 1949.

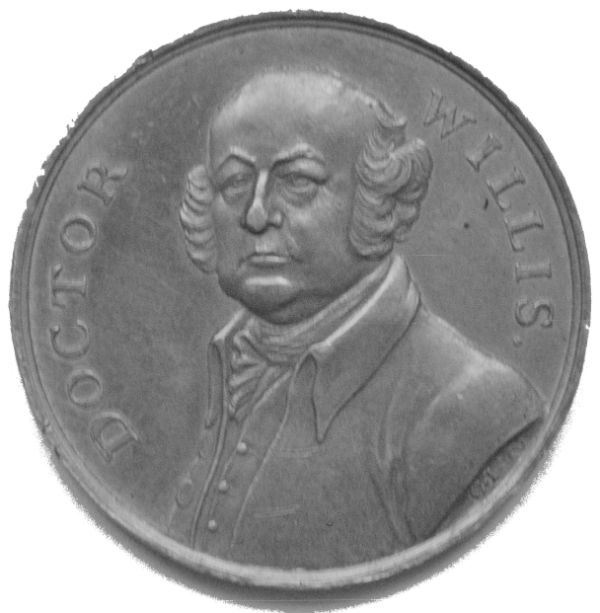
The front of the medal issued by Dr Willis to commemorate his 'cure' of King George III. The rear says Britons Rejoice, Your King's Restored, along with the date of 1789.

Twelve years later in 1801 King George suffered a relapse and his symptoms returned. On the second occasion he was treated by two of Francis's sons, also physicians, John Willis and his younger brother, Robert Darling Willis. The King had a final relapse in 1810 that proved incurable and he lapsed into an illness and madness that lasted until his death in 1820.

=== Treating Queen Maria I of Portugal ===
Willis' fame would lead him to help Queen Maria I of Portugal in 1792 who suffered from episodes of madness. His role was advisory and did not see success as in the case of King George III. His recommendations included psychotherapy and proper nutrition as opposed to medication. The job earned him a total of £16,000.

== Legacy ==
The original Greatford Hall sanatorium closed in 1838 and was mostly destroyed by fire in 1930, but was mostly rebuilt and is now a private residence.

There is a monument to Dr Willis in the form of a Joseph Nollekens bust, in the transept of his local Church of Thomas Becket in Greatford. The commemorative inscription reads:

Sacred to the memory of
The Revd. Francis Willis MD
Who died on 5 December 1807
In the 90th year of his age
He was the third son of the Revd. John Willis of Lincoln
A descendant of an ancient family of the same name
That resided formerly at Fenny Compton in Warwickshire
He studied at Oxford; was Fellow and sometime Vice-Principal of Brazen Nose College: Where in
obedience to his father, he entered into holy orders. But pursuing the bent of his natural taste and
inclination he took the degree of Doctor of Physic in the same University and continued the practice
of the profession to the last hour of his life.
By his first wife Mary, the youngest daughter of the Revd. John Curtois of Branston in this County,
he had five sons who survived him. By his second wife he had no issue.
Initiated early into habits of observation and research, he attained the highest eminence in his
profession and was happily the chief agent in removing the malady which affected his present majesty
in the year 1789. On that occasion he displayed an energy and acuteness of mind which excited the
admiration and procured for him the esteem of the Nation. The kindness and benevolence of his
disposition were testified by the tears and lamentations which followed him to the grave.

Lincolnshire Partnership NHS Foundation Trust's inpatient low secure unit is the Francis Willis Unit. It 'provides assessment and treatment for males aged 18 to 65 years with a primary diagnosis of mental illness who may exhibit challenging or high risk behaviours... We aim to promote recovery and rehabilitation, enable the reduction of risks posed and ultimately enable the individual to leave the secure environment for one less restrictive.'

== References in literature ==
Willis's reputation was revived by Alan Bennett's play The Madness of George III, and its later film adaptation, The Madness of King George with a sympathetic portrayal by actor Ian Holm. The Willises are portrayed as the callous jailers of Windsor Castle in Susanna Clarke's novel Jonathan Strange & Mr Norrell, under the impression that visitors, exercise, or other distractions would provoke hysteria in King George III. He is also referenced by Stephen Maturin in Patrick O'Brian's novel The Thirteen-Gun Salute.
