= Magicienne-class frigate =

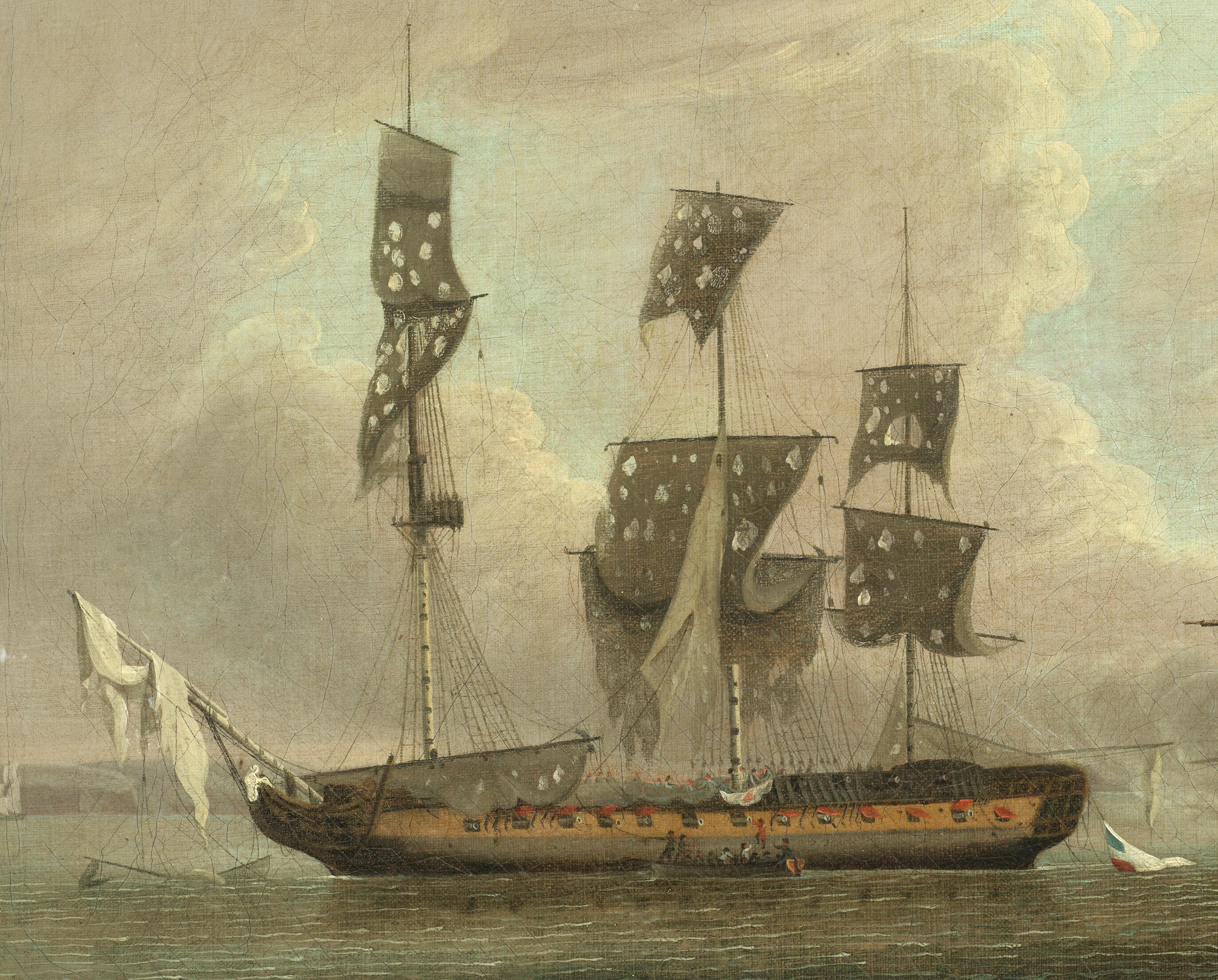
- Réunion at the action of 20 October 1793

Class overview
- Name: Magicienne
- Builders: Toulon
- Operators: French Navy; Royal Navy
- Planned: 12
- Completed: 12

General characteristics
- Type: Frigate
- Displacement: 1,100 tonneaux
- Tons burthen: 600 port tonneaux
- Length: 44.2 m (145 ft 0 in)
- Beam: 11.2 m (36 ft 9 in)
- Draught: 5.2 m (17 ft 1 in)
- Armament: 32 guns: 26 × 12-pdr long guns; 6 × 6-pdr long guns

The Magicienne class was a class of twelve fifth rate 32-gun frigates of the French Navy, each with a main battery of 26 × 12-pounder long guns, and with 6 × 6-pounder guns on the quarterdeck and forecastle. They were designed by Joseph-Marie-Blaise Coulomb.

- Magicienne

Builder: Toulon
Ordered: 7 February 1777
Begun: March 1777
Launched: 1 August 1778
Completed: October 1778
Fate: captured by the Royal Navy off Boston on 2 July 1781 and commissioned.

- Précieuse

Builder: Toulon
Ordered: 7 February 1777
Begun: March (or August?) 1777
Launched: 22 August 1778
Completed: November 1778
Fate: out of service in January 1804; broken up in July 1816.

- Sérieuse

Builder: Toulon
Ordered: 28 August 1778
Begun: March 1779
Launched: 28 August 1779
Completed: October 1779
Fate: sunk at the Battle of the Nile on 1 August 1798

- Lutine

Builder: Toulon
Ordered: 23 October 1778
Begun: March 1779
Launched: 11 September 1779
Completed: November 1779
Fate: captured by the Royal Navy in August 1793 and commissioned before being wrecked on 9 October 1799; her ship's bell was salvaged and still hangs in Lloyd's of London.

- Vestale

Builder: Toulon
Ordered: 20 April 1780
Begun: May 1780
Launched: 14 October 1780
Completed: February 1781
Fate: captured by the Royal Navy off Bordeaux on 19 August 1799.

- Alceste

Builder: Toulon
Ordered: 20 April 1780
Begun: May 1780
Launched: 28 October 1780
Completed: February 1781
Fate: captured on 29 August 1793 by the Royal Navy at Toulon, but retaken by the French Boudeuse on 8 June 1794, then captured again on 18 June 1799.

- Iris

Builder: Toulon
Ordered:
Begun: May 1781
Launched: 29 October 1781
Completed: March 1782
Fate: captured in August 1793 by the Royal Navy at Toulon, but burnt on 18 December 1793 during the evacuation.

- Réunion

Builder: Toulon
Ordered:
Begun: February 1785
Launched: 23 February 1786
Completed: January 1787
Fate: captured by the Royal Navy off Cherbourg on 18 October 1793 and commissioned.

- Modeste

Builder: Toulon
Ordered:
Begun: February 1785
Launched: 18 March 1786
Completed: January 1787
Fate: captured by the Royal Navy at Genoa on 7 October 1793 and commissioned.

- Sensible

Builder: Toulon
Ordered: 23 January 1786
Begun: February 1786
Launched: 29 August 1787
Completed: March 1788
Fate: captured by the Royal Navy off Malta on 28 June 1798 and commissioned.

- Topaze

Builder: Toulon
Ordered: 14 March 1789
Begun: August 1789
Launched: 26 September 1790
Completed: February 1791
Fate: captured by the Royal Navy at Toulon on 29 August 1793 and commissioned.

- Artémise

Builder: Toulon
Ordered:
Begun: end 1791
Launched: 25 September 1794
Completed: November 1794
Fate: sunk at the Battle of the Nile on 2 August 1798
