= French frigate Iris (1781) =

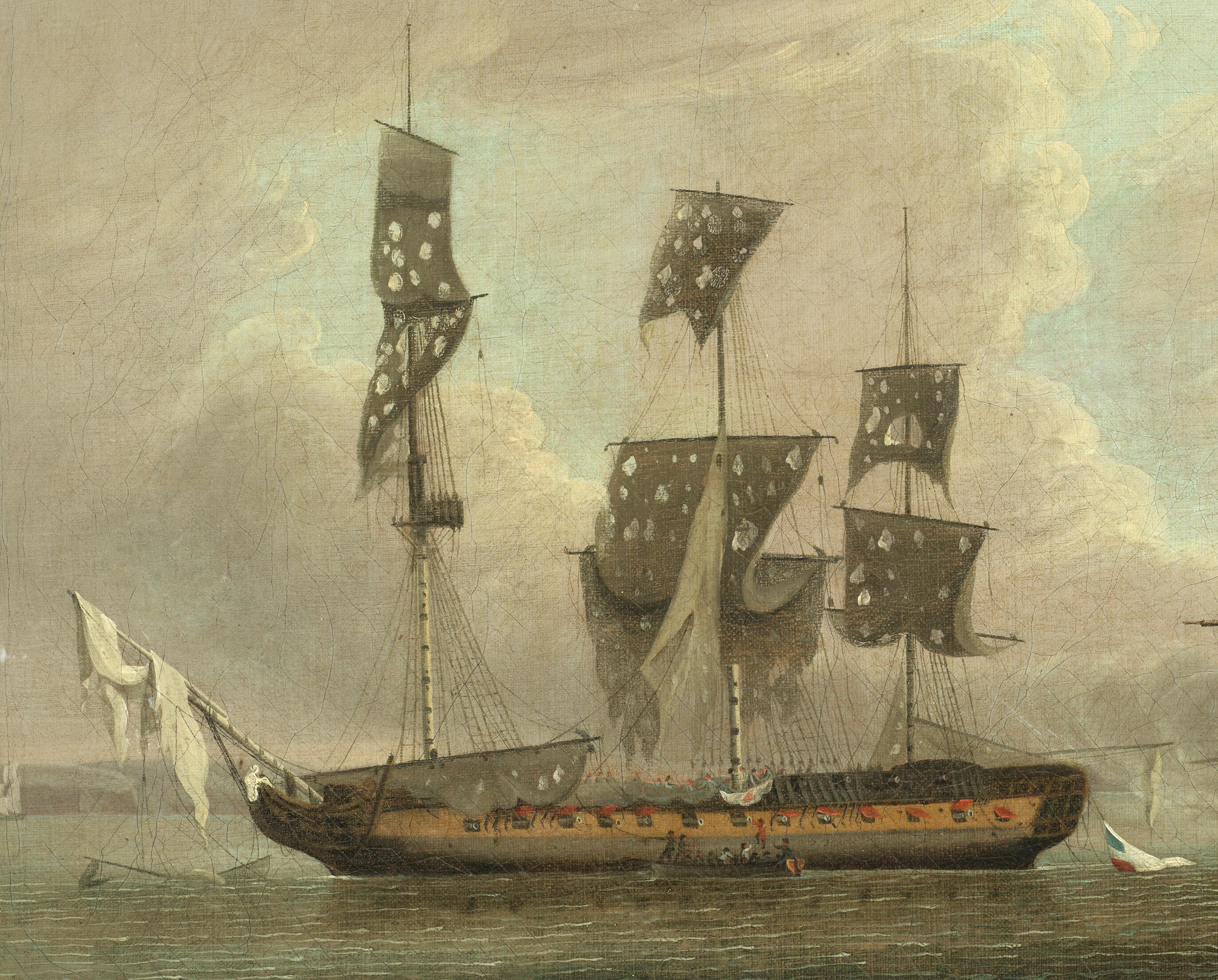
- Réunion, Iris's sister ship

History

France
- Name: Iris
- Builder: Toulon shipyard
- Laid down: May 1781
- Launched: 29 October 1781
- Completed: February 1782
- Captured: August 1793
- Fate: Destroyed December 1793

General characteristics
- Class & type: Magicienne-class frigate
- Displacement: 1,100 tonneaux
- Tons burthen: 600 port tonneaux
- Length: 44.18 m (144.9 ft) (overall); 38.66 m (126.8 ft) (keel)
- Beam: 11.21 m (36.8 ft)
- Draught: 5.2 m (17 ft) (laden)
- Depth of hold: 5.79 m (19.0 ft)
- Sail plan: Full-rigged ship
- Complement: 265–285
- Armament: 26 × 12-pounder long guns; 6 × 6-pounder guns

Iris was a Magicienne-class frigate, one of seven, launched at Toulon in 1781 for the French Navy. Between 1781 and 1784, there were two French frigates Iris, this newly launched frigate, and the former USS Hancock, which the British had captured in 1781 in the American theatre and renamed Iris, and which the French had captured in 1781 and sold in 1784. The British captured the new Iris at Toulon on 28 August 1793, and burned her on their evacuation of the city in December.

== Fate ==
When the Royalist French surrendered Toulon to Lord Hood in 1793, they found Iris dismantled and being used as a powder hulk. As the republicans advanced on the town, the Anglo-Spanish forces evacuated, destroying the arsenal and as many ships as they could of those that they could not sail out of the port. Captain Sidney Smith took charge of a small squadron of three English and three Spanish gunboats and went into the inner harbour to scuttle the ships. Against orders, instead of sinking one of the frigates, the Spanish crew of one gunboat set the frigate alight. The vessel, possibly Iris, was being used to store one thousand barrels of gunpowder. The resulting explosion blew the British gun boat Terrible, commanded by Lieutenant Patey, to pieces; however, the men were picked up alive. Another British gunboat, Union, which was nearest to Iris, too was blown to pieces; her commander, Mr Young, was killed, together with three of his men. At least one other powder hulk, French frigate Montréal, was also destroyed in the evacuation, and Iris was recorded as being one of those burnt in the retreat.
