= French frigate Sérieuse =

French frigate

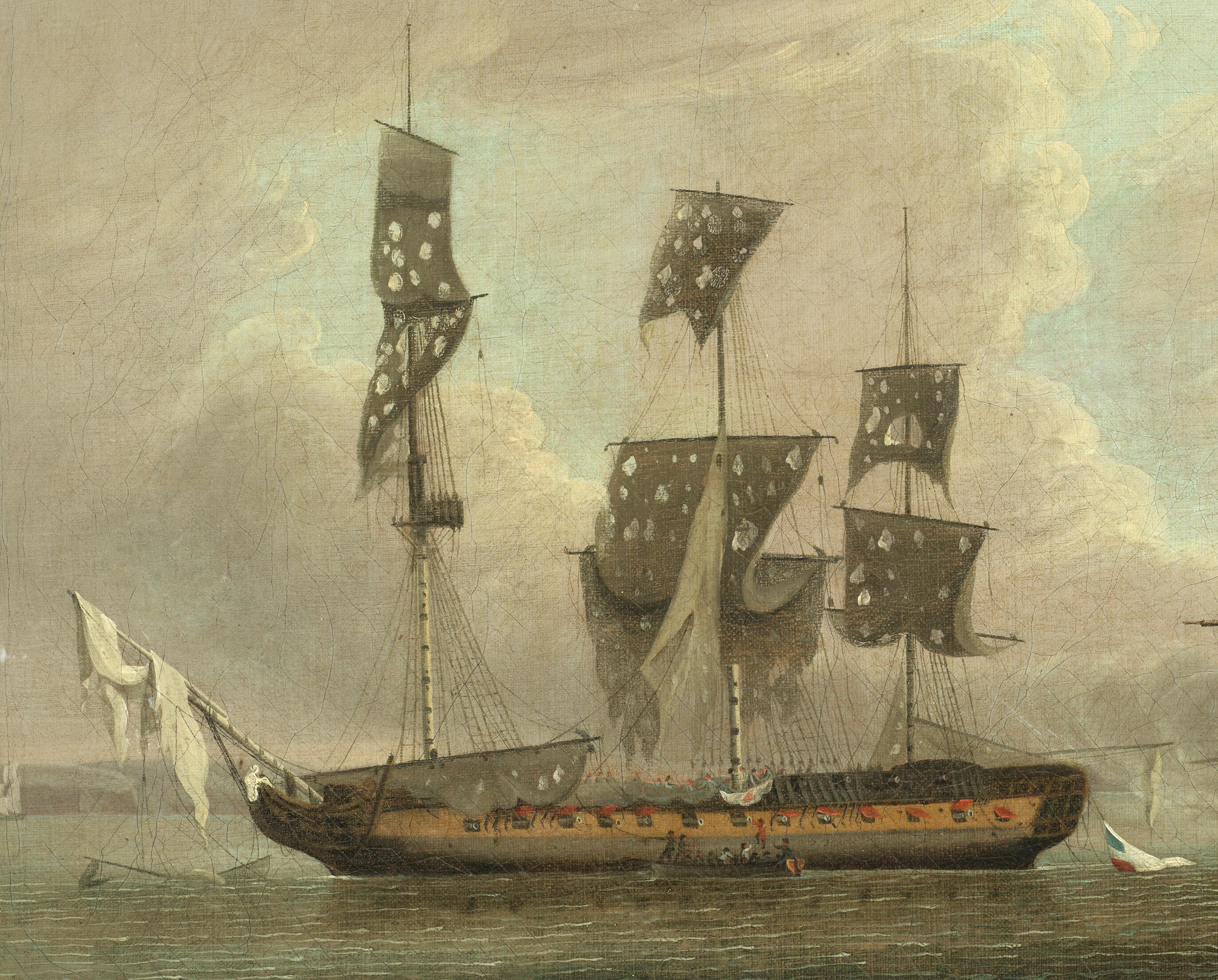
- Réunion, Sérieuse's sister ship

History

France
- Name: Sérieuse
- Namesake: "serious"
- Ordered: 28 August 1778
- Builder: Toulon
- Laid down: March 1779
- Launched: 28 August 1779
- Commissioned: October 1779
- Fate: Destroyed 1 or 2 August 1798 Battle of the Nile

General characteristics
- Class & type: Magicienne-class frigate
- Displacement: 1,100 tonneaux
- Tons burthen: 600 port tonneaux
- Length: 44.12 m (144 ft 9 in) (overall); 38.66 m (126 ft 10 in) (keel)
- Beam: 11.21 m (36 ft 9 in)
- Draught: 5.2 m (17 ft 1 in) (laden)
- Complement: 265–285
- Armament: Upperdeck:26 × 12-pounder long guns; Spardeck:6 × 6-pounder long guns

Sérieuse was a Magicienne-class frigate of the French Navy, launched in 1779.

== Career ==
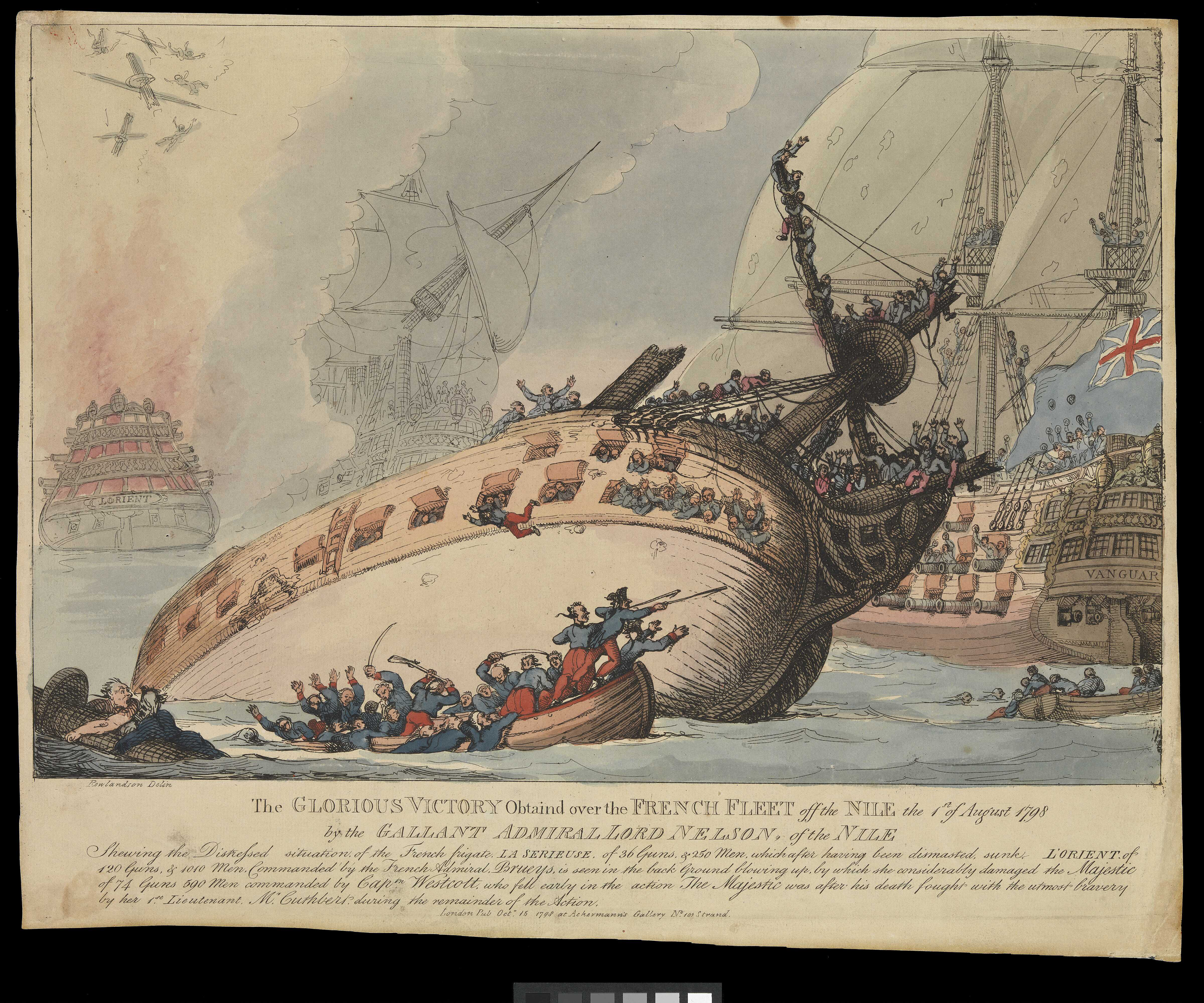
The distressed situation of Sérieuse by Thomas Rowlandson

In 1781, Sérieuse ferried soldiers after the Invasion of Minorca.

She was at Toulon when the Coalition captured the city. When they left, on 18 December 1793, they attempted to burn her. However, the French managed to extinguish the fire and save the ship.

On 9 June 1794, Sérieuse captured HMS Speedy off Nice.

In 1798, she took part in the Expedition of Egypt, and in the Battle of the Nile. She attempted to reinforce the crew of Tonnant by sending 150 men of her own crew. The next night, 1 August 1798, HMS Orion sank Sérieuse.
