= Richard Saumarez =

British surgeon and medical author (1764–1835)

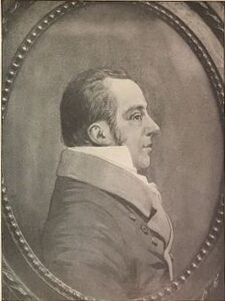
- Born: 13 November 1764; Saint Peter Port
- Died: 27/28 January 1835; The Circus
- Occupation: Surgeon
- Spouse(s): Martha Le Mesurier, Elizabeth Enderby Hetherington
- Relatives: James Saumarez, 1st Baron de Saumarez; Thomas Saumarez

Richard Saumarez FRS FRSE FSA FRCS (13 November 1764 – 27/28 January 1835) was a British surgeon and medical author.

Saumarez was a prolific writer, with advanced ideas regarding the subject of medicine and medical education. Coleridge identified and praised Saumarez for his "masterly force of reasoning, and the copiousness of induction, with which he has assailed, and (in my opinion) subverted the tyranny of the mechanic system in physiology; established not only the existence of final causes, but their necessity and efficiency to every system that merits the name of philosophical; and, substituting life and progressive power for the contradictory inert force, has a right to be known and remembered as the first instaurator of the dynamic philosophy in England." (Biographia Literaria, Chapter 12)

== Life ==
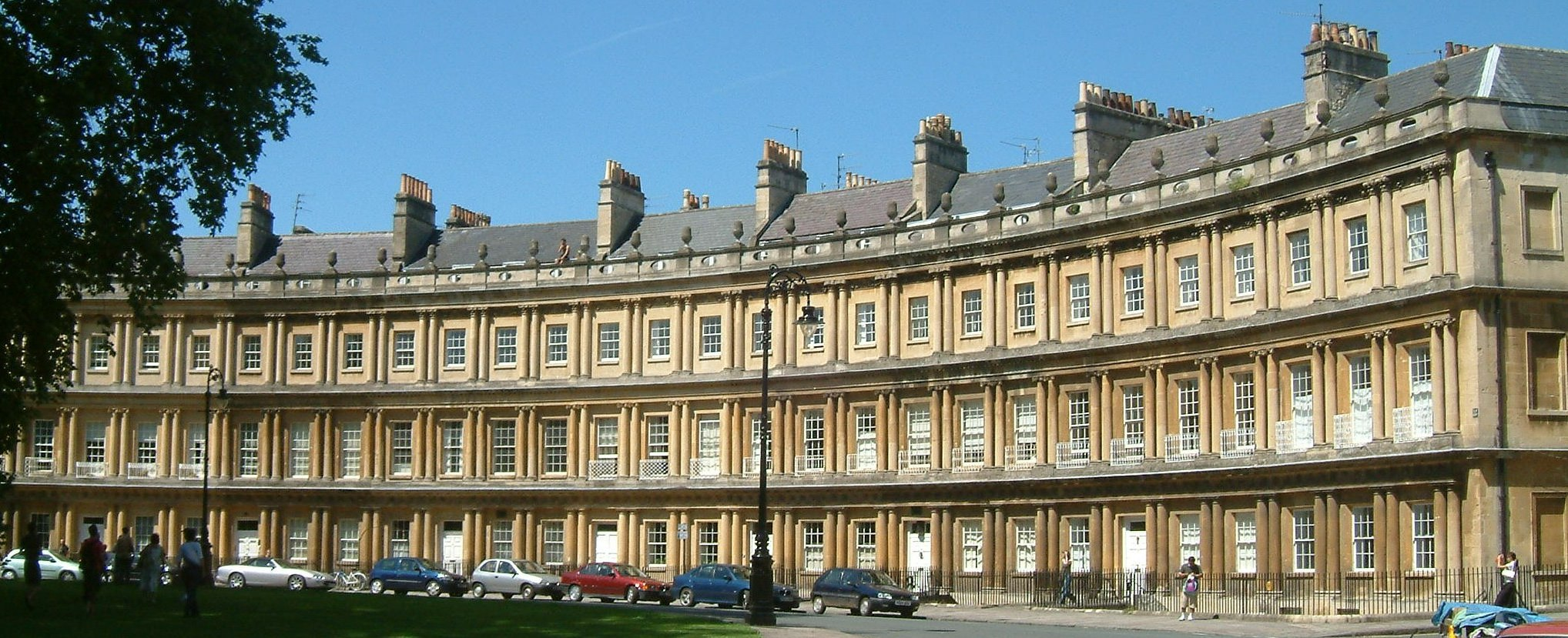
The Circus in Bath

Saumarez was born in Guernsey on 13 November 1764 to Matthieu Saumarez and Cartarette Le Marchant. Both parents died when he was young, and he later went to London to study medicine at the London Hospital. His older brothers were Admiral James Saumarez, 1st Baron de Saumarez and General Sir Thomas Saumarez

Saumarez trained under Sir William Blizard. He was admitted a member of the Company of Surgeons on 7 April 1785.

He married Martha Le Mesurier on 7 January 1786 in Guernsey. She died in 1801 and on 29 May 1804 he married a widow, Mrs Elizabeth Hetherington (née Enderby).

He was also elected a Fellow of the Royal Society in 1834.

In 1788, Saumarez became surgeon to the Magdalen Hospital, Streatham, until 1 March 1805 when he was appointed an honorary governor.

Saumarez had a large and lucrative practice in London until 1818. He then retired to Bath, where he died at 21 The Circus on 28 January 1835.

== New Physiology ==
=== Bacon, Hunter and True Science ===
Saumarez dedicates his book on physiology to Dr. John Hunter amongst others.

To the late MR. J. HUNTER, to DR. GOODWIN, SPALLANZANI, and a few others, we are eminently indebted for many valuable facts obtained through the medium of experiments ... thereby manifesting the natural condition of things without altering it.

Saumarez also praises Bacon for having set down a true method of approach to nature, through direct observation based on clear ideas, not just the collection of facts.

The carpenter who chips the timber, and the mason who polishes the marble, are not to be considered as the men of science; but he alone, who, from a precise knowledge of principles and of causes, is able to direct those materials to be arranged with order, form, and symmetry. It was with that end in view, that his lordship analysed before he generalised; that he has separated the individual from the species; the species from the genus; and, from a multitude of effects, endeavoured to arrive at cause.

True science for Saumarez is designed to analyse facts to arrive at the necessary historical understanding and basic or first principles which takes sense impression to understanding.

Without the full possession of these permanent and universal facts, a general, not a particular knowledge of any subject can ever be obtained: without history, we can never have definition; and without axiom, there can be no science.

Knowledge, properly so called, does not simply consist in the impressions made on the senses by the operations of external phenomena; true knowledge can only be admitted to exist, when we are in full possession of the cause whence the effects are derived; and he alone can be denominated the man of science, who is able to connect the cause with the effect.

Saumarez argued that the level of knowledge in his day was poor and corrupted by false principles. In particular, the study of chemistry was not only still ignorant of the principles of "elective attraction," but sought to extend the principles that only held for dead and common matter to the realm of living matter.

It is greatly to be lamented that the pursuits of the chemists, instead of being confined to their proper objects—to the examination of the qualities of matter, dead and common—have been equally, but improperly, directed and extended to the investigation of living matter also; hoping to explore the causes of animation, and of vital action, from chemical phenomena, which are the inevitable attributes of decomposition and decay.

=== Three Systems of Matter ===
Instead of the usual classification into animal, vegetable and mineral, Saumarez proposes a classification based on 'matter.'

I shall class the whole system of nature, as it has been called, and the matter of which it is composed, under the three distinct heads,— of common,—of living,—and of dead matter.

FIRST, By living matter, I comprehend the various orders of living beings with which the universe is replenished and adorned.

SECONDLY, By dead matter, I confine myself to the exuviæ of animals, and of vegetables; as well as to the whole substance of which these beings are composed, after the actions of life are at an end, and the state which is known by the appellation of death.

THIRDLY, By common matter, I mean the primitive, or original materials, or elements, of which the world is composed; matter which either, has never received the participation of life, or having received, has lost it, and been resolved back into a common state.

Saumarez distinguishes between the property of living matter that is general and diffused through the whole system, and active - materia vitae diffusa - and that which is particular and dormant. The former maintains the preservative (sustentive) and participative (generative) capacity of a living organism. The principle of life is the principium vitae diffusum. We could also say that the former is the inherent capacity of the system to respond, and the latter is the result of the interaction of the former with the exciting powers, the stimuli of Dr. Brown and the Brunonian system of medicine. Saumarez claims that Hunter preceded Brown with his principle of a living principle, which Brown then expressed in the idea of excitation as the stimuli for bringing potential life or excitability to actual life or excitement.

Saumarez then also distinguishes between physiology and physics.

To physiology, belongs the province of investigation [of] the properties of living matter. To physics such as is dead, or common...

=== Different Laws for Different Systems of Matter ===
Each system of matter "not only in the progress of its evolution, but in the actions it performs, is governed and impelled by laws, distinct and peculiar".

The laws and principles governing dead or common matter (chemistry) cannot be employed to any useful end in understanding living matter (physiology). As an example, the "assimilating and convertible power" or "converting power of the assimilating organ" found in digestion, as "proved by Mr. Hunter and Spallanzani" cannot be explained by chemical laws and actions, but must be performed by a "living power resident in the organ and its secretions, in this case, that of the gastric juice of animals and man." From all of his observations of the facts from previous experiments, Saumarez is led to the logical conclusion that "the process of digestion...is not a chemical, but a living, act." He is further led to conclude that this living power, which is able to first dissolve, diffuse and then re-arrange external matter into a new unified form, "pervades throughout the whole range of animated existence" whether animal or vegetable. And the essence of this living power is that it is able to overcome the chemical laws, so that they resist being reduced to the elements (entropy).

Saumarez also addresses the living power of the mind which is necessary to relate to living sense experience.

Although the organs of sense are the avenues through which impressions from external objects are first made, it is from the native vigor and power of the mind, that ideas are made to flow; while the spark comes from without, the flame resides within; although it is set in motion by external means, it is from the power of mind alone, by which those ideas and motions ought to be directed.

The mind on the contrary, which subsists not like the organs in parts, but as a whole total and universal, receives the impressions wholly and totally, and contemplates altogether, and at once, the various attributes of the body, a perception of which the organs of sense had separately obtained. While the organs of sense, therefore, distinguish the particular attributes of a body, the mind, on the contrary, receives and conceives these perceptions, universally; things partible it views impartibly; things divisible, indivisibly; things temporal, eternally.

This correlates with his contemporary Coleridge's view of the imagination as a creative power (governed by laws that are 'the very powers of growth and production"), that is "vital, even as all objects (as objects) are essentially fixed and dead"). As with Coleridge, Saumarez sees mind and consciousness to be a creative function that is higher and greater than sense-experience, indeed, as Coleridge puts it, "in the mind's self-experience there are evidently two powers at work, which relatively to each other are active and passive; and this is not possible without an intermediate faculty, which is at once both active and passive."

Thus, the act of thinking presents two sides for contemplation, – that of external causality, in which the train of thought may be considered as the result of outward sensations, of accidental combinations, of fancy, or the associations of memory, –and on the other hand, that of internal causality, or of the energy of the will on the mind itself. In philosophical language, we must denominate this intermediate faculty in all its degrees and determinations, the IMAGINATION, the compleating power which unites clearness with depth, the plenitude of the sense with the comprehensibility of the [intellect], impregnated with which the [intellect] itself becomes [understanding]– an intuitive and living power. (Biographia Literaria)

=== Duality of Living Power ===
Saumarez also sees that the nature of this living power is both sustentive and generative, and has been spoken of throughout history in different ways, including most recently by Dr. John Brown.

It is by the energy of this same living power, resident in the seed of plants, and in the fecundated ova of animals, that the acorn becomes evolved into an oak,—the infant foliage expanded into leaves,—and the whole process of nutrition and of growth carried on. It is this power which constitutes the architect and the fabricator, by which the whole machine is erected; it is the base on which the whole stands, it forms the bond of its elementary parts,—the cement that unites them into one whole; it is the cause primary and efficient, whence the individuality of every living system arises, in which the form and the sex it assumes, essentially reside; by which, the human species differs from the brute, the brute from the vegetable, the vegetable itself from matter inanimate and common; this power it is, which I call life. The matter, which this power has assimilated and organised, it is, which I call living matter. It is this principle, which has been named by ARISTOTLE, eidoz,—by HARRIS, form—by STAHL, vis medicatrix naturæ—by HALLER, vis vitæ—by BLUMENBACH, nisus formativus—by J. BROWN, excitability ... and by HUNTER, principle of life. This last term appears to me so appropriate and distinct, that I shall consequently retain it. The principle of life may be defined to be "that power, by whose energy different species of matter are assimilated to one kind, a living system organised and formed; and the various parts of which it is composed, are protected and preserved from decomposition and decay.

=== Organization of Life ===
Thus, what we see in living organisms is simply an organisation of powers, forces and energies according to real prototypes or ideas in the non-material, super-sensible domain. It is by way of this living power that health and disease derive.

Admitting these undeniable truths, the conclusion presses itself upon the mind with force irresistible, that these attributes must, of necessity, belong to a principle immaterial, and incorporeal, by whose activity, matter formless becomes organised;—by whose vivacity it becomes endowed with the power of action, and of motion; exerting the same influence, and governing by the same laws, every particle of this matter which it has assimilated; and constituting the power whence the organisation originates—the fountain, whence health and disease are made to flow.

This living power exists prior to any "organic action" and this pre-existing state Saumarez terms 'pre-disposition'. Like Brown, he also sees that the potential or dormant living power must be brought into action and motion.

It is the same thing with respect to the living principle, and the different organs which it has produced; it not only demands a certain state and temperature of the medium in which it is placed, but particular kinds of food, as well as particular conditions of it, before that dormant power can become power active, and the phenomena be produced of organic action.

Saumarez sees in the regular, organised functions and processes of living beings a unifying cause within the system itself, the living principle that keeps everything operating in a harmonious whole, both through the power of expansion, growth and that of containment or formation.

When we behold the regularity with which the actions of vegetables are performed, as well as the simplicity in the construction of their frame,—we are naturally led to conclude, that those actions, constant and definite as they seem to be, must flow from the operation of causes which exist uniformly and invariably the same, without any opposing or controlling power; residing within the system itself, by the energy of which those actions can either be suppressed, or prevented...

=== Living Power Not Simply Irritability ===
This living power is not to be equated or reduced to the nervous or sensitive power of plants and animals. The first is extensive throughout and the second is more limited in extent, as not all plants and animals have it, or it does not operate throughout the organism, absolutely or equally (in health). The sensitive power, however, is generally prevalent in animals and gives them knowledge of the external world. The cause of sensation lies not so much in the object, but in the sensory organ receiving the impression. This sensitive power is the basis for the pleasure principle, and in its lower form, the instincts and their actions. In humans, however, there is something else besides the instincts.

=== Polarity Between Instinct and Consciousness ===
In terms of the capacity for instinct and the use of the sensory organs, man is inferior compared to a given animal. Vegetables, equally, have a superior power of propagation to that of animals and man. As one rises higher, the power of propagation is exchanged for that of sensation, and sensation exchanged for something else in man - mind or consciousness.

In man, the animal instincts must be mastered and converted by a higher power, that of self-consciousness through the power of rational thought. Instinctual action is not freedom, but the path of degeneration for man. Saumarez also speaks of the power of the mind to integrate sensations. These connect with Locke's ideas on self-consciousness (see Romantic medicine) and Coleridge's ideas, noted above regarding the power of imagination, both primary and later, in a more conscious way, secondary imagination.

Although the organs of sense are the avenues through which impressions from external objects are first made, it is from the native vigor and power of the mind, that ideas are made to flow; while the spark comes from without, the flame resides within; although it is set in motion by external means, it is from the power of mind alone, by which those ideas and motions ought to be directed.

== Mind and Consciousness ==
Man is a reasoning and ideating being, not simply an instinctual one, and the development and evolution of consciousness allows him to direct and free himself from the compulsion of the instincts. As Saumarez states,

the more he indulges his senses, the power of his mind becomes progressively weakened; that instead of attaining the prerogative of being a free agent, he continues in the condition of a child, or of a man who lives like a brute, impelled and chained down.

And this power of thought, an internal experience, is higher than that of sense experience ("the objects of intellect [cognition] cannot be derived from objects of sense; otherwise, they would be subordinate, and not superior to sensible things"). The objects of sense experience are there to help man perfect his self-awareness and self-consciousness and "perfect", that is, raise his mind and consciousness to higher levels, all the way up to spirit, the main concern of Romantic epistemology (to overcome the split between Nature and God or Spirit).

Instead of being confined, like vegetables, to the production of the species; or, as in the brute, to the gratification of the senses; these objects constitute, in man, the lowest of the ends which he is designed to attain: those which are most congenial to his nature, and which form the true end of his existence, more especially consist, in the perfection of his MIND.

Like Brown, it is also those experiences that are agreeable or "congenial" that act to raise the mind and consciousness, and these resonant experiences then activate the mind to dwell on a higher and deeper, objective need against the subjective wants derived from the baser instincts.

It is by the proper exercise of these powers... directed to those objects which seem to be congenial to its nature, that man feels conscious that he constitutes the first of all generated beings; that although excited by appetite and sense, he is nevertheless able to resist, to subdue, and even to act in opposition to those wants; often compelling the body to fast, when it craves for food,—to receive medicines which convey impressions nauseous and painful;—to expose itself to the inclemency of the seasons, and to various dangers: to labor and to fatigue; and patiently to submit to death itself.

This power of the mind (cognition) for Saumarez is self-contained and self-referential.

It is, however, very plain that we have a power of interrupting a train of thoughts, and of dwelling more intensely upon particular ideas, and even of occasionally directing our reflections and contemplations into new channels; and this power alone, is sufficient to constitute man, a free agent.

== Physiology: Examples ==
Saumarez provides many examples of living actions which cannot be explained by or reduced to chemical/physical processes.

After vegetable or animal food has been digested by a living system, the commutation it has sustained is total and complete...

The process of digestion therefore, by means of which different kinds of food are assimilated into one kind, is not a chemical but a living [alchmical] act...

... it is lawful, and we are from necessity led to conclude, that the commutation food obtains in the living system, is a vital and not a chemical act, and that the efficient cause of this commutation does not arise from any active property which the food contains, but is owing to the power of the system in which it is received, and by which the new arrangement of its parts is formed.
.. the quality of the matter acted upon and changed by the organ, bears no similitude to that which it originally possessed: instead therefore of things external acting upon the living system, it is the living system that acts upon things external.
Far different indeed are the effects that are produced when things external act upon the living system, when the organs have not the power of acting upon, or even resisting the action of, the substances they receive...Instead of animal or vegetable matter being converted into chyle, putrefaction and fermentation take place.
It is to the power by the energy of which every living system is protected and preserved from decomposition and decay, and by which the different substances it receives are assimilated and changed, that I attach the idea of Life; the Vis Medicatrix Naturæ of Stahl; the Vis Vitæ of Haller; the Nisus Formativus of Blumenbach; the Living Principle of Mr. Hunter; the Excitability of Dr. Brown...

Saumarez also takes from Hunter his example concerning the action of plant sap in a living and isolated context.

Such is the nature of the vegetable system, that the temperature of its parts seems in a considerable degree to depend on that of the surrounding medium. Mr. Hunter, in a number of experiments which he made upon the sap of different trees, found it frequently to be as low as 15 degrees of Fahrenheit, and that then it preserved its natural and unfrozen state; but, on the contrary, when it was taken out of the vessels of the tree, it would freeze at the elevated temperature of 32°. The cause of this diversity evidently arose from the different circumstances under which it was situated: in the one it was in union with the whole of the living system, resisting, by virtue of its living power, the external operation of cold; its vitality therefore preserved its fluidity: in the other, the loss of vitality which the sap had sustained by separation from the system to which it belonged, weakened its powers of preservation and of resistance; it therefore underwent the same changes of congelation that matter of an inanimate kind is found to sustain.

In another case that Saumarez provides we can also see the degeneration of living fluids, in this case hepatic bile, from a yellow, active state, to a greenish, almost black state when it becomes cystic bile. For Saumarez, this is a function of a law of nature governing organic action and involving a polarity between 'sensible' properties and 'living' properties, or between living matter and common matter.

The question then is, whether the sensible properties of cystic bile above enumerated, arise from any addition it receives from the gall-bladder, or whether they do not proceed from a privation of its living principle, the loss of which makes the whole to be decomposed into its constituent parts.

It seems more probable that the sensible properties cystic bile ultimately assumes, arise from a deprivation of its preservative power, by which it begins to lose the identity of its own nature, and undergoes nearly the same changes by residence in the gall-bladder that it would have done out of the living system.

It is a law universally true, that the further effects depart from their causes, the power of retaining their own qualities is proportionally weakened and diminished.

Since then the gall-bladder is the part of the whole hepatic system most remote from the liver (the cause and source of biliary secretion), every instant of time bile remains in the gall-bladder, it is constantly changing from a better to a worse condition — from a living to a dying state. It is by the principle of this law that we are to take hepatic bile as the standard by which the quality of cystic bile is to be measured, and by which we are to conclude that the sensible qualities it assumes are foreign to the excellence of its nature.

In this regard, Saumarez also refers to functions of the mind, which increase as corporeal powers or vitality wanes, an idea also correlative to Coleridge's views on the creative imagination and mind, but also the reverse.

If I were disposed to admit that maternal desires or propensities could have any influence on the offspring, it would only be a stronger proof of the imperfection of the species; it would shew, that when the imagination is most strong the power of corporeal perfection is most weak; weaker, therefore, in the most enlightened than in the most imbecile of mankind; and, finally, weaker in the brute than in the vegetable tribe.

== Writings ==
1. ‘A Dissertation on the Universe in general and on the Procession of the Elements in particular,’ London, 8vo, 1795.
2. ‘A New System of Physiology,’ London, 8vo, 1798, 2 vols.; 2nd edit. 8vo, 1799, 2 vols.; 3rd edit. 8vo, 1813, 2 vols. in 1.
3. ‘Principles of Physiological and Physical Science,’ London, 8vo, 1812.
4. ‘Oration before the Medical Society of London,’ 8vo, London, 1813.
5. ‘A Letter on the evil Effects of Absenteeism,’ 8vo, Bath, 1829.
6. ‘On the Function of Respiration in Health and Disease,’ Guernsey, 1832.
7. ‘Observations on Generation and the Principles of Life,’ in the ‘London Medical and Physical Journal,’ 1799, ii. 242, 321. [contains the germ of most of his subsequent writings].
8. 'On the principles and ends of philosophy: Comprehending an examination of the systems which now prevail and also a detail of the erroneous principles on ... founded, and of the evils to which they tend' 1811.
