= James Saumarez, 1st Baron de Saumarez =

Royal Navy officer (1757–1836)

Admiral The Right Honourable The Lord de Saumarez GCB
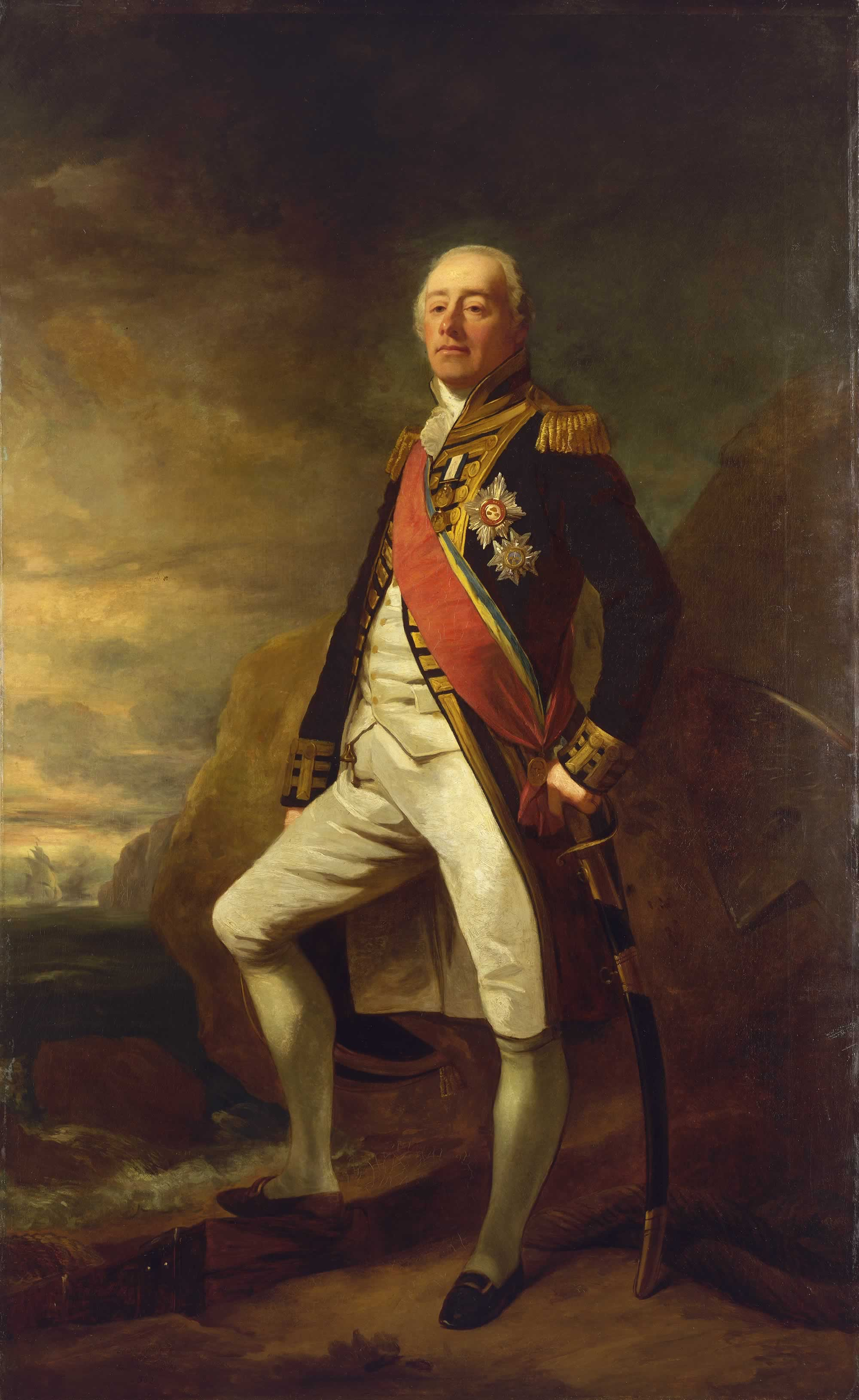
- Portrait by Edwin Williams, 1862
- Born: 11 March 1757; St Peter Port, Guernsey
- Died: 9 October 1836 (aged 79); Guernsey
- Military career
- Allegiance: Great Britain; United Kingdom
- Branch: Royal Navy
- Service years: 1770–1821
- Rank: Admiral of the Red
- Commands: Channel Islands Station; Baltic Fleet; Plymouth Station
- Conflicts: Fourth Anglo-Dutch War; Battle of the Dogger Bank; American Revolutionary War; Battle of the Saintes; French Revolutionary Wars; Battle of Groix; Battle of Cape St Vincent; Battle of the Nile; First Battle of Algeciras; Second Battle of Algeciras; Napoleonic Wars
- Awards: Peerage; Baronetcy; Knight Grand Cross of the Order of the Bath; Commander Grand Cross of the Order of the Sword (Sweden); Freedom of the City of London

Admiral of the Red James Saumarez, 1st Baron de Saumarez, (Note: Saumarez is pronounced "Sommeray".) GCB (11 March 1757 – 9 October 1836) was a Royal Navy officer known for his victory at the Second Battle of Algeciras.

== Early life ==
Saumarez was born at Saint Peter Port, Guernsey, to an old island family, the eldest son of Matthew de Saumarez (1718–1778) and his second wife Carteret, daughter of James Le Marchant. He was a nephew of Captain Philip Saumarez and John de Sausmarez (1706–1774) of Sausmarez Manor. He was also the elder brother of General Sir Thomas Saumarez (1760–1845), Equerry and Groom of the Chamber to the Duke of Kent, and afterwards Commander-in-Chief of New Brunswick and of Richard Saumarez (1764–1835), a surgeon and medical author. Their sister married Henry Brock, the uncle of Major-General Sir Isaac Brock and Daniel de Lisle Brock. Many of de Sausmarez's ancestors had distinguished themselves in the naval service, and he entered it as midshipman at the age of thirteen. Upon joining the Navy, he dropped the second 's' to become de Saumarez.

== Naval service ==
=== Early service in the Mediterranean and American Revolutionary War ===
In 1767, Saumarez was entered as a volunteer on the books of HMS Solebay although he never set foot in the ship, studying at a school near London until in 1770, Saumarez joined the Montreal in the Mediterranean. Placed on board HMS Winchelsea, he was rated midshipman in November 1770. A transfer to HMS Levant in February 1772 until she returned to Spithead in 1775 gave an opportunity to take his examination for lieutenant.

In 1775, at the age of 18, Saumarez was ordered to Sir Peter Parker's flagship HMS Bristol in North America. Saumarez distinguished himself under Parker, showing courage and being promoted to acting lieutenant at the July 1776 Battle of Sullivan's Island which required the Bristol to fire broadsides at Fort Sullivan. The engagement lasted 13 hours and 111 men were killed in the Bristol.

Saumarez moved to HMS Chatham as temporary 5th lieutenant. He received his first command, the tender Lady Parker. On promotion to lieutenant in 1778 he received his second command, the 8-gun galley Spitfire. After forty-seven engagements, unfortunately he had to run Spitfire ashore and burn her on 30 July 1778 when a French fleet under Admiral d'Estaing arrived at Narrangansett Bay. Saumarez then served on land at the Battle of Rhode Island before returning to Portsmouth.

Saumarez next served as third lieutenant in HMS Victory, under various admirals until it became Vice Admiral Hyde Parker's flagship, by which time he had moved up to 1st lieutenant. He moved with the Admiral to HMS Fortitude, in which he was present at the Battle of Dogger Bank on 5 August 1781, when he was wounded. He was promoted commander and appointed to the fireship Tisiphone. In 1782, Saumarez sailed his ship to the West Indies with despatches for Samuel Hood and arrived in time to witness the closing stages of Hood's operations at St Kitts on 25 January 1782.

=== Battle of the Saintes ===
While commanding HMS Russell (74 guns), Saumarez contributed to Rodney's victory over de Grasse at the Battle of the Saintes on 12 April 1782. During the battle and on his own initiative, Saumarez took his ship out of line to assist in the capture of de Grasse's flagship, Ville de Paris. This action prompted Admiral Rodney to remark that, "The Russell's captain is a fine fellow, whoever he is."

When the war in America was finished, Saumarez went ashore and did not go to sea again until 1793 when he was given command of the frigate HMS Crescent, a 36-gun fifth rate frigate.

=== Action of 20 October 1793 ===
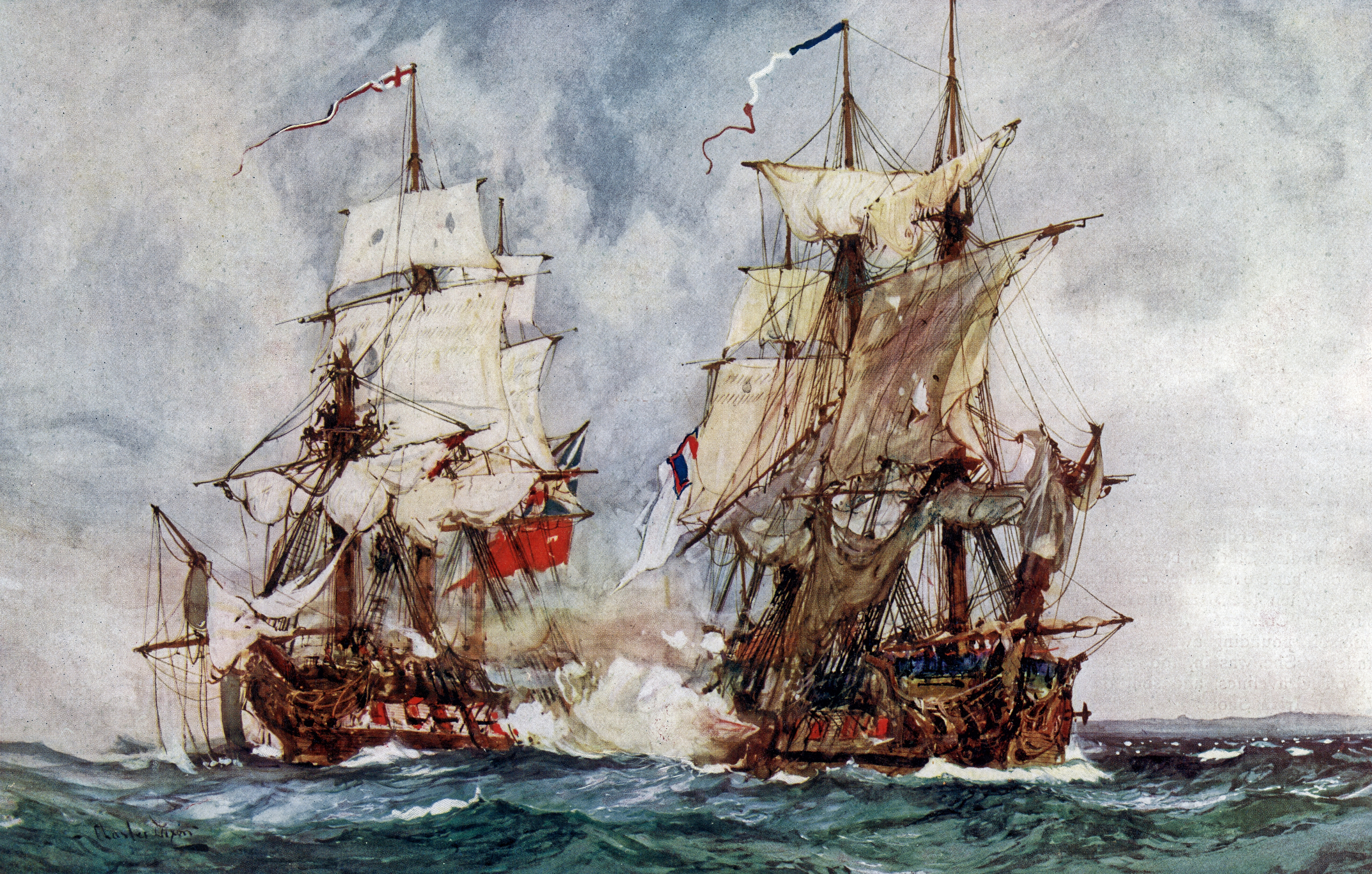
Illustration of Crescent, under Saumarez, engaging Réunion by Charles Dixon

It was in Crescent that Saumarez was involved in one of the first major single-ship actions of the war when he captured the French frigate Réunion, in the action of 20 October 1793. British casualties were exceptionally light, with only one man wounded during the engagement. In reward, Saumarez was knighted by King George III and given a presentation plate by the City of London, although he later received a bill for £103 6s 8d (equivalent to £13,000 in 2025), from a Mr. Cooke for "the honour of a knighthood". Saumarez refused to pay, telling Cooke to charge whoever had paid for Edward Pellew's knighthood after his successful action. Saumarez later wrote to his brother that "I think it hard to pay so much for an honour which my services have been thought to deserve".

=== Channel Islands Station (1794) ===
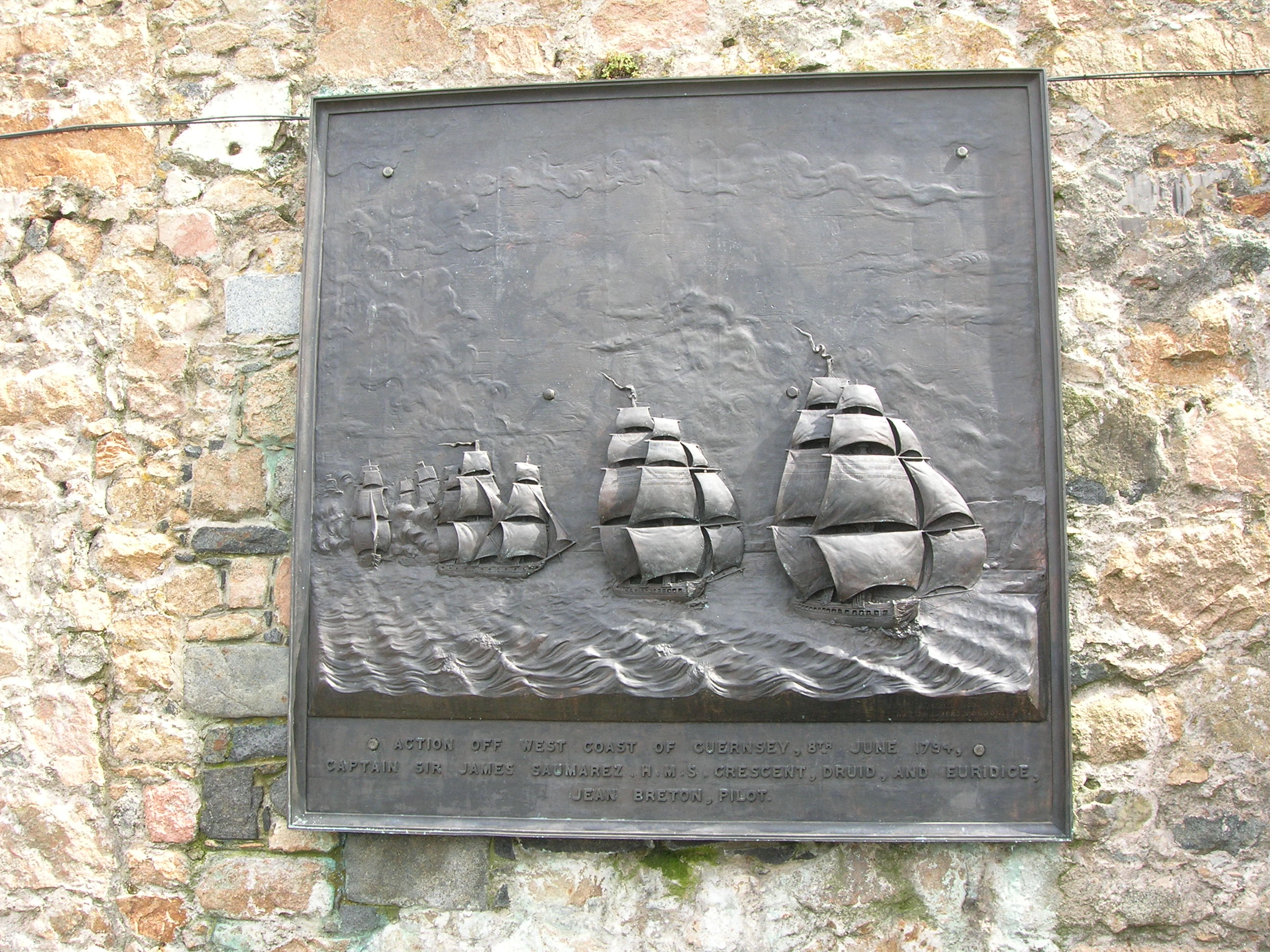
Frieze of HMS Crescent escaping from the French squadron

While in command of a Guernsey-based squadron consisting of three frigates, HMS Crescent, HMS Druid, and HMS Eurydice, and some smaller vessels a planned invasion by 20,000 French soldiers of the Channel Islands scheduled for February 1794 was frustrated and cancelled due to Saumarez's vigilant eye. On 8 June 1794 on the way from Plymouth to Guernsey, the squadron, which included six smaller vessels, including hired armed lugger Cockchafer and Valiant, encountered a superior French force of two razees, three frigates, and a cutter. The French squadron outgunned the British by 192 guns to 92, but Saumarez succeeded in getting his frigates to safety by sailing between rocks on the west coast of Guernsey and around the island to the St Peter Port anchorage. The British luggers and cutters had returned to Plymouth before the start of the action. The British threat to any invasion force stayed intact.

=== Battle of Cape St Vincent ===
In 1795, Saumarez was appointed to the 74-gun HMS Orion in the Channel fleet, where he took part in the defeat of the French fleet at the Battle of Groix off Lorient on 22 June. Orion was one of the ships sent to reinforce Sir John Jervis in February 1797, when Saumarez distinguished himself in the Battle of Cape St. Vincent. During the early stages he helped repel a sustained attack on the British line and covered the retreat of HMS Colossus when she was forced to retire from the action. Colossus had sustained serious damage, her sails being virtually shot away and it looked as though she would be raked by Spanish warships, until Orion intervened. Later, when the engagement had turned to a general melee, Saumarez forced the Salvador del Mundo to surrender before attacking the Santissima Trinidad with the help of HMS Excellent. Saumarez was certain he had forced her surrender too when the arrival of the remainder of the Spanish fleet forced Jervis to break off the engagement.

=== Blockade of Cádiz and the Battle of the Nile ===
Saumarez remained with Jervis's fleet and was present at the blockade of Cádiz from February 1797 to April 1798. In May 1798, the Orion joined the squadron under Nelson's command that was sent into the Mediterranean to seek and destroy the French. Saumarez was Nelson's second in command at the Battle of the Nile where he distinguished himself once more, forcing the surrender of the Peuple Souverain and the 80-gun Franklin.

=== Battle of Algeciras and Gut of Gibraltar ===
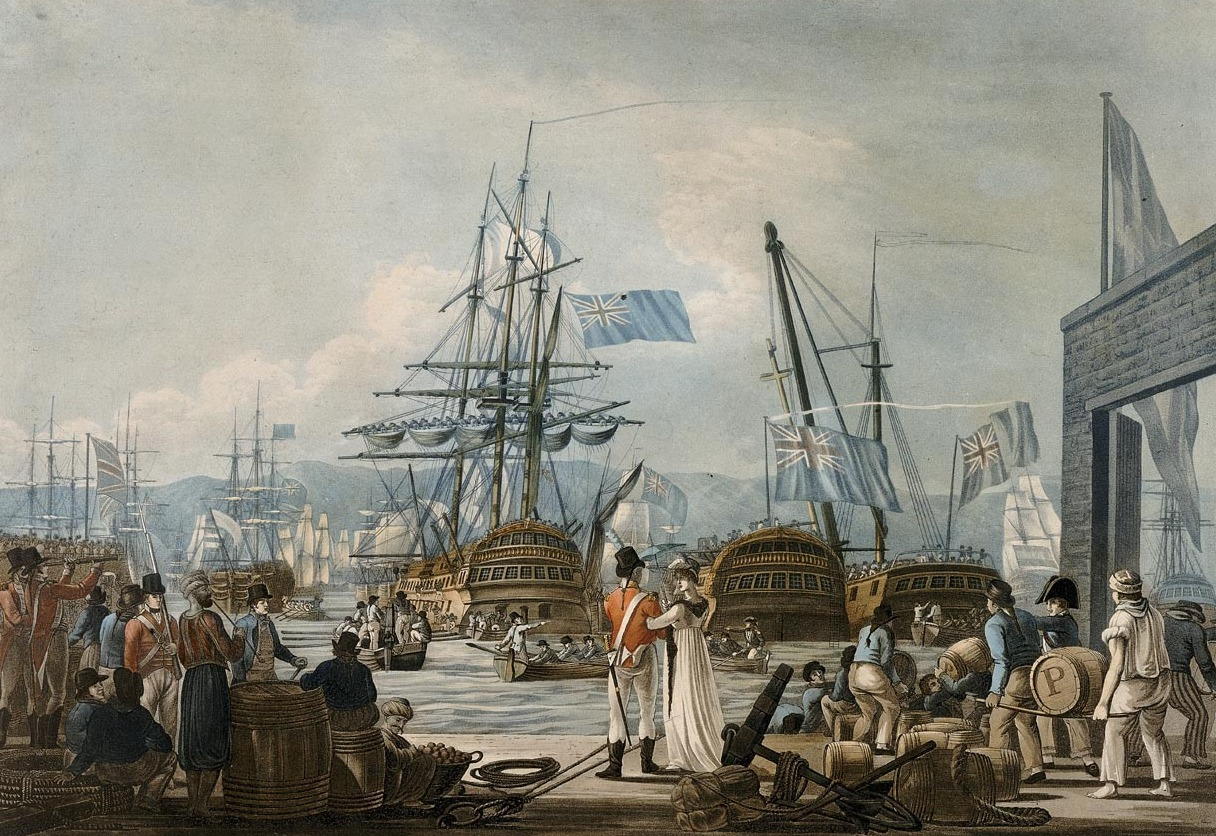
Saumarez's fleet preparing to set sail from Gibraltar on 12 July 1801

Annuity to Admiral Saumarez Act 1803
- Act of Parliament
- Parliament of the United Kingdom
- Long title: An act to enable his Majesty to grant a certain Annuity to Rear Admiral Sir James Saumarez Baronet, and Knight of the most Honourable Order of the Bath, in Consideration of his eminent Services which he has performed on various Occasions.
- Citation: 43 Geo. 3. c. 37
- Territorial extent: United Kingdom

Dates
- Royal assent: 22 April 1803
- Commencement: 22 April 1803 (Note: The Acts of Parliament (Commencement) Act 1793.)
- Repealed: 6 August 1872
Other legislation
| Repealed by | Statute Law Revision Act 1872 |

Status: Repealed

Text of statute as originally enacted

On his return from Egypt Saumarez received the command of HMS Caesar, of 80 guns, with orders to watch the French fleet off Brest during the winters of 1799 and 1800. In 1801 he was promoted to the rank of Rear-Admiral of the Blue, was created a baronet, and received the command of a small squadron which was to watch the movements of the Spanish fleet at Cádiz. Between 6 and 12 July he performed an excellent piece of service in the Algeciras campaign. In the first battle of Algeciras he launched an attack on a French squadron anchored under the protection of shore batteries in Algeciras Bay. Extensive shoals and a fickle breeze hindered his chances of success and HMS Hannibal was captured by the French.

Saumarez refused to accept this first defeat and repaired his ships and regrouped for a further attack. When the French squadron, reinforced by Spanish ships sent from Cádiz, tried to leave the bay, Saumarez, although substantially outnumbered, went in pursuit. He sent HMS Superb, Captain Richard Keats, ahead and that ship almost singlehandedly brought about the destruction of two Spanish three-deckers and the capture of a French 74 in the Second Battle of Algeciras. For his services, Saumarez received the Order of the Bath and the Freedom of the City of London. In 1803, the United Kingdom Parliament bestowed upon him an annuity of £1,200 a year (Annuity to Admiral Saumarez Act 1803).

On 30 April 1802 HMS Caesar, under his command, made contact with USS Constellation near Gibraltar. During the Peace of Amiens, 1802–3, Saumarez remained at home with his family in Guernsey, and when war broke out again he was given command of the naval forces defending the Channel Islands. He therefore was not present at the 1805 Battle of Trafalgar. On 23 April 1804 he was promoted to Rear-Admiral of the White.

=== Channel Islands Station (1806–1808) ===
On 9 November 1805 he was advanced to the rank of Rear-Admiral of the Red. In 1806 he took command of the Channel Islands squadron on that station for the second time, his flagship was HMS Inconstant. While in command he was promoted Vice-Admiral in April 1807, his flagship was HMS Prince of Wales. He remained in command of the station until February 1808.

=== The Baltic Campaign ===
In March 1808 Saumarez was given command of the Baltic fleet with his flag in HMS Victory. Saumarez's mission was to protect the British trade which was of vital importance for Royal Navy supplies and to blockade enemy ports such as those under French control in northern Germany. The Russian fleet was also kept under blockade until Alexander I reopened Russian ports. On 13 July 1810 he was promoted to the rank of Vice-Admiral of the Red. Sweden, under pressure from France, declared war on Britain in November 1810 but Saumarez showed conspicuous tact towards the government of Sweden and her shipping, correctly guessing that the Swedes, like their Russian neighbours, would eventually defy Napoleon. Charles XIII later bestowed on him the Grand Cross of the military Order of the Sword. Denmark, a French satellite, also needed to be kept under observation until it was invaded by the Swedish Army in 1814. In 1812 Napoleon invaded Russia with half a million troops and Saumarez's fleet was instrumental in hampering French operations.

=== Latter years and Plymouth Station ===
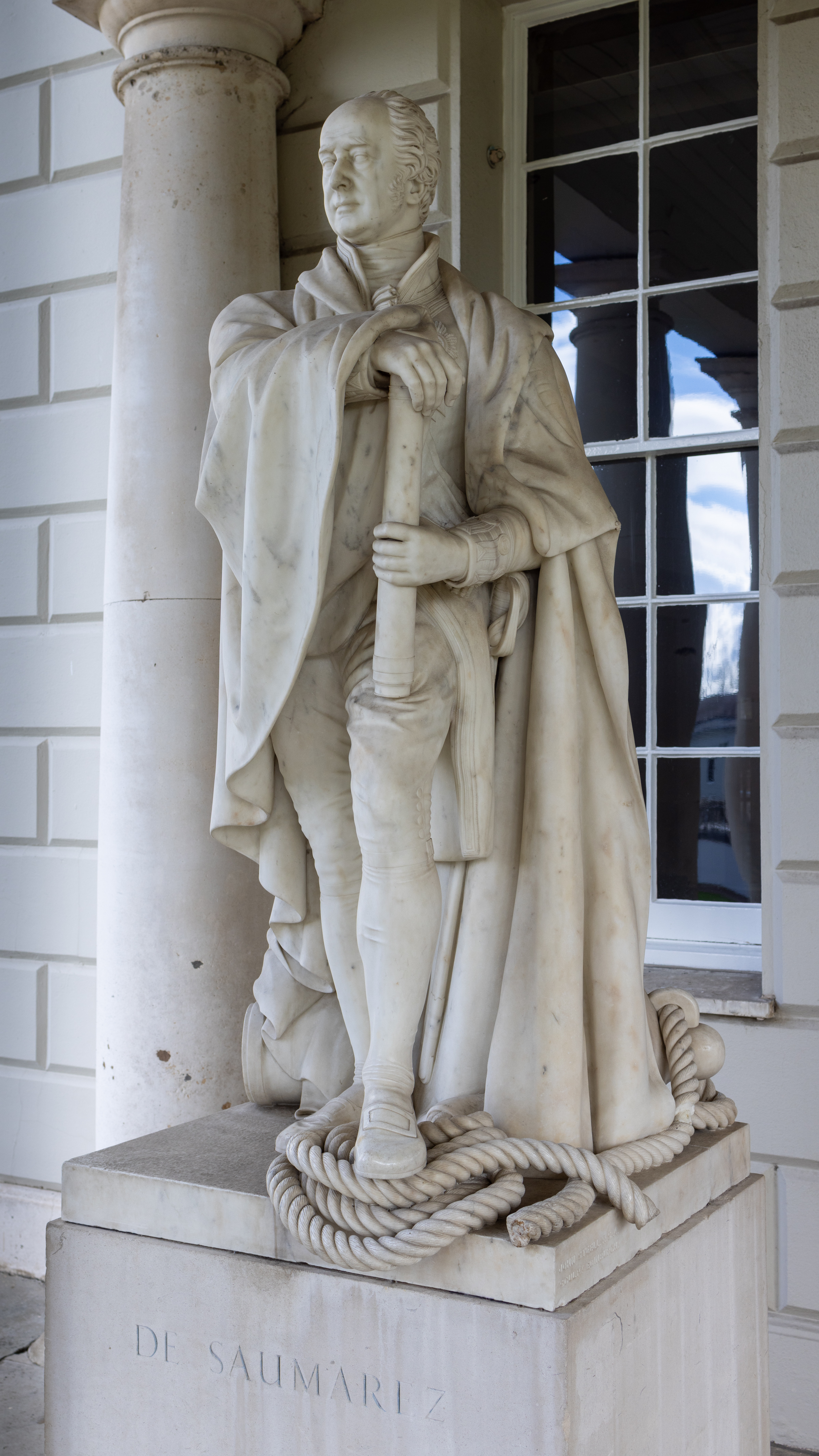
Statue of Saumarez by John Steell at the National Maritime Museum, Greenwich

At the Peace of 1814, Saumarez attained the rank of Admiral of the Blue, On 18 July 1819 he was made Rear-Admiral of the United Kingdom. On 12 August 1819 he was advanced to the rank of Admiral of the White. On 21 November 1821 he was appointed Vice-Admiral of the United Kingdom. From 1824 to 1827 he was Commander-in-Chief, Plymouth. On 22 July 1830 he was promoted to the rank of Admiral of the Red. He was raised to the peerage as Baron de Saumarez in 1831 and died in Guernsey in 1836. In memory of Saumarez's achievements, there is a statue of him by John Steell in the National Maritime Museum in London. The public bar at the Duke of Normandie Hotel in Saint Peter Port was named after Saumarez and features a portrait of him.

=== Relationship with Nelson ===
Saumarez and Nelson served together in 1797 and 1798, but their relationship was not a close one. In fact on a number of occasions it became quite strained. They first clashed after the Battle of Cape St Vincent. Saumarez had forced the surrender of the Santissima Trinidad but was unable to capture her because Jervis was forced to break off the engagement. Nelson attempted to console Saumarez by telling him that the Spanish had confirmed that the Trinidad had indeed surrendered. Saumarez tersely replied "Whoever doubted it, sir? I hope there is no need for such evidence to establish the truth of a report of a British officer."

In May 1798, when Saumarez was appointed to Nelson's squadron in the Mediterranean, Nelson preferred to confer with Troubridge and even though, as the senior captain, Saumarez was technically second in command, he was often left out of their conversations. After the Battle of the Nile, while in conversation with Nelson, on the quarterdeck of HMS Vanguard, Saumarez suggested that the tactic of doubling the French line had been a dangerous one as it exposed British ships to 'friendly fire'. Before he had a chance to explain, Nelson cut him off and angrily went below. Nelson decided that Saumarez should escort the prizes home, and they never served together again. Later Nelson wrote a letter saying, "I could have formed no opinion of Orion that was not favourable to her gallant and excellent commander [Saumarez] and crew". However, the awkwardness between them remained.

== Family ==
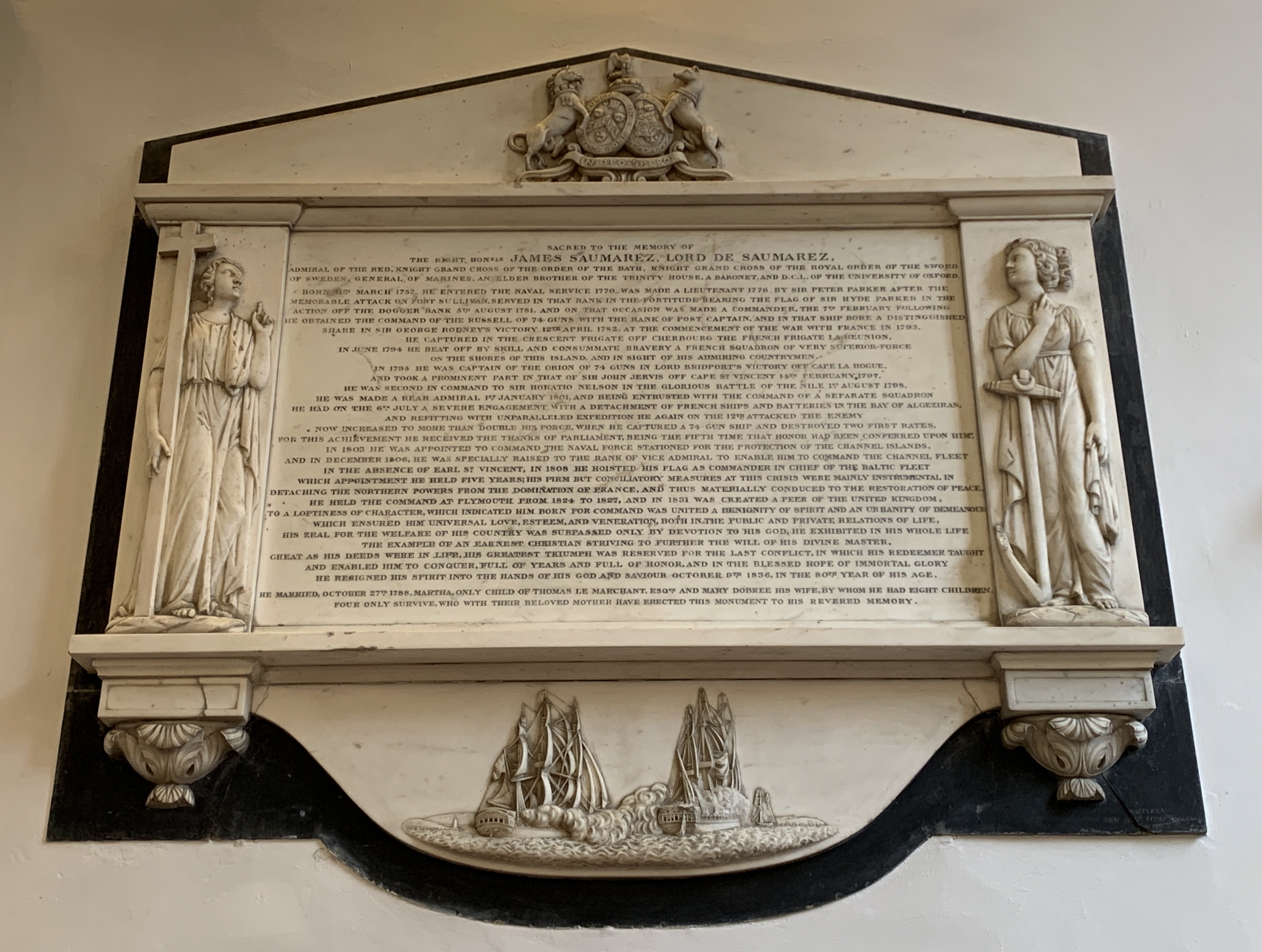
Memorial in Town Church, Guernsey

In 1788, Saumarez married Martha le Marchant (d. 1849) of a wealthy Guernsey family, who brought the estate now known as Saumarez Park into the marriage. They had three sons and four daughters: The eldest, James (1789–1863), succeeded to the peerage, was a clergyman and died without children; he was succeeded in the peerage by his brother, John St. Vincent Saumarez (1806–1891).

== Appearances in naval fiction ==
Saumarez appears as a minor character in C. S. Forester's Hornblower novel The Happy Return as a rear-admiral and is mentioned again in the later Hornblower novel The Commodore as the admiral soon to be commanding in the Baltic.

Saumarez appears as admiral of the Gibraltar Squadron in Master and Commander and also as admiral of the Baltic Fleet in The Surgeon's Mate, books from Patrick O'Brian's Aubrey–Maturin series.

In Treachery (2008) (US title The Privateer's Revenge) by Julian Stockwin, Saumerez's purported orders (actually a forgery) result in the disgrace of Thomas Kydd. Saumarez returns as commander of the Baltic Fleet in The Baltic Prize (2017).

== Coat of arms ==
Coat of arms of James Saumarez, 1st Baron de Saumarez
| Coronet A coronet of a Baron Crest A Falcon displayed proper. Escutcheon Argent on a Chevron Gules between three Leopards' Faces Sable as many Castles triple-towered Or. Supporters Dexter: an Unicorn tail between the legs Argent navally gorged Azure charged on the shoulder with a Castle triple-towered Or; Sinister: a Greyhound Argent collared Gules rimmed Or charged on the shoulder with a Wreath of Laurel Vert encircling an anchor Sable. Motto In Deo Spero (I hope in God) |

== Bibliography ==
- Sir John Ross, Memoirs of Admiral Lord de Saumarez (2 vols, 1838)
- Shayer, David James Saumarez: The Life and Achievements of Admiral Lord de Saumarez of Guernsey (La Société Guernesiaise 2006)
- The Naval Chronicle, Volume 6. J. Gould, 1801. (reissued by Cambridge University Press, 2010. ISBN 978-1-108-01845-6)
- Nelson and His Captains Dr W H Fitchett (Smith, Elder & Co. 1911 5th Edition pages 200–231)

Military offices
| Preceded by Sir Alexander Cochrane | Commander-in-Chief, Plymouth; 1824–1827 | Succeeded by Lord Northesk |
Honorary titles
| Preceded by Sir William Young | Rear-Admiral of the United Kingdom; 1819–1821 | Succeeded by The Earl of Northesk |
| Preceded by Sir William Young | Vice-Admiral of the United Kingdom; 1821–1832 | Succeeded by The Viscount Exmouth |
Peerage of the United Kingdom
| New creation | Baron de Saumarez; 1831–1836 | Succeeded by James Saumarez |
Baronetage of the United Kingdom
| New creation | Baronet (of Guernsey); 1801–1836 | Succeeded by James Saumarez |
