= HMS Circe (1785) =

Enterprise-class Royal Navy frigate

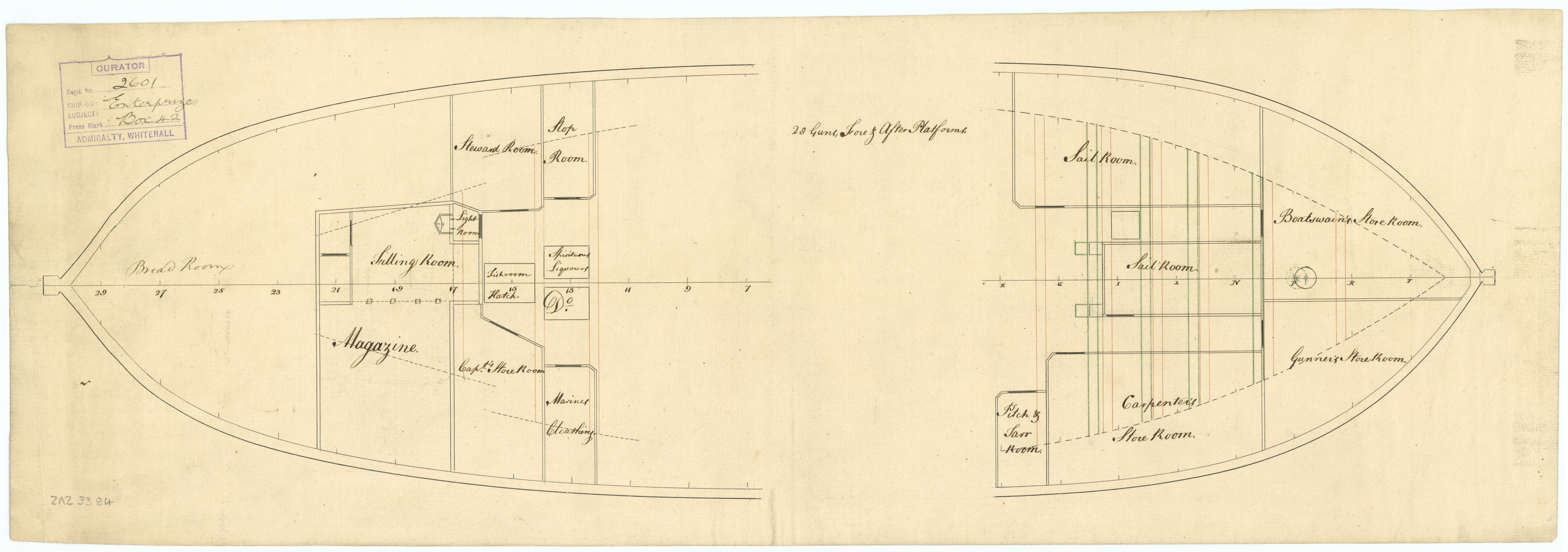
- Lower deck plan of Circe

History

Great Britain
- Name: HMS Circe
- Ordered: 6 March 1782
- Builder: Henry Ladd, Dover
- Laid down: December 1782
- Launched: 30 September 1785
- Completed: 2 November 1790
- Commissioned: September 1790
- Honors and awards: Naval General Service Medal (NGSM) with clasp "Camperdown"
- Fate: Wrecked 17 November 1803

General characteristics
- Class & type: Enterprise-class sixth-rate frigate
- Tons burthen: 599 55/94 (bm)
- Length: 120 ft 6 3/8 in (36.738 m) (gundeck); 99 ft 5 in (30.30 m) (keel)
- Beam: 33 ft 7 3/4 in (10.255 m)
- Depth of hold: 11 ft 0 in (3.35 m)
- Sail plan: Full-rigged ship
- Complement: 200 officers and men
- Armament: Gun deck: 24 × 9-pounder guns; QD: 4 × 6-pounder guns + 4 × 18-pounder carronades; Fc: 2 × 18-pounder carronades

HMS Circe was a 28-gun Enterprise-class sixth-rate frigate of the Royal Navy. She was launched in 1785 but not completed or commissioned until 1790. She then served in the English Channel on the blockade of French ports before she was wrecked in 1803.

== Career ==
Circe was first commissioned in September 1790 under the command of Captain George Oakes. She was paid off in October 1791. Captain A. H. Gardiner commissioned her in April 1792.

== French Revolutionary Wars ==
Joseph Sydney Yorke was promoted to post-captain on 4 February 1793 and given command of Circe, then part of a squadron under Admiral Richard Howe. He patrolled off the French port of Brest. In March Circe took the French ships Diane, Vaudreuil and Jeune Felix. Circe shared the prize money for Diane and Vaudreuil with Druid. On 18 March Circe captured the Danish brig Pelican.

Then in May Circe took the French privateers Didon (or Dido) and Auguste (or 1 Auguste). Didon was armed with 14 guns and had a crew of 100 men. Auguste was armed with 18 and had a crew of 160. Lastly, Circe captured the privateer Coureur (or Courier), of 10 guns and 84 men. She shared with Aimable in the prize money for Courier, which they had captured on 26 May.

With Nymphe, Circe captured the corvette L'Espiegle on 20 November. Espiegle was pierced for 16 guns, and was manned with 100 men under the command of Mons. Pierre Biller, Enseign de Vaisseau. The Royal Navy took Espiegle into service under her existing name.

Circe played a minor, supporting role at the action of 20 October 1793 and consequently shared with Crescent in the prize money for Réunion. At some point Circe and Phaeton recaptured the brig Venus and sloop Ant, "laden with Butter". On 24 May 1794, Circe recaptured the brig Perseverance, while in company with the rest of the squadron under the command of Rear-Admiral Montagu.

In October 1794 Captain Peter Halkett took command of Circe. In May 1797, due to the exertions of her officers, Circe's crew did not join the Spithead and Nore mutinies. Halkett received orders to put out to sea, which he did, leaving Yarmouth and sailing, together with some hired armed vessels to protect merchant trade. He continued to cruise until his supplies were almost exhausted and then he sailed Circe into the Humber. He then waited at Hull until the mutiny was over. Halkett received the "thanks of the Admiralty and the freedom of the town of Hull for the conduct of his ship during the alarming period." On 23 August 1795, Circe captured the Swedish corn vessel, Auguste Adolphe, in the North Sea.

In October 1797 Circe was part of the squadron under Sir Henry Trollope that was at the Texel to watch the Dutch fleet. On 11 October Circe served to repeat signals for the Starboard or Weather Division under Admiral Adam Duncan at the Battle of Camperdown. On 12 February 1798 £120,000 in prize money resulting from the sale of Dutch ships captured on 11 October 1797 was due for payment. In 1847 the surviving members of the crews of all the British vessels at the battle qualified for the NGSM with the clasp "Camperdown".

In December 1797 Captain R. Winthrop replaced Halkett. On 14 May 1798 Circe sailed with Sir Home Popham's expedition to Ostend attack the sluice gates of the Bruge canal. In the early hours of 18 May, the expedition landed in 1,300 troops under Major General Coote. The army blew up the locks and gates, but was then forced to surrender. Winthrop commanded the seamen landed from the different ships, and for getting the powder and mines up for the destruction of the locks. To signal his approbation, Home Popham had Winthrop and Circe carry back the dispatches. Circe lost two master's mates killed.

Between 27 July and 29 August 1798, Circe captured five Greenland ships and six Iceland doggers.

On 4 June 1799, Circe and Jalouse recaptured the sloop Ceres. Six days later, Circe recaptured Expedition from the French. Then at the end of the month, on 26 June, Circe and the hired armed cutter Courier captured Twee Gesisters. Two days later, Winthrope sent in the boats of Circe, Jalouse, Pylades, Espiegle, and Tisiphone to cut out some gunboats at Ameland. When the British arrived, they found that their targets were pulled up on shore where the cutting out party could not reach them. The British instead took out 12 merchant vessels, six with cargoes and six in ballast, and retreated. There were no British casualties, even though Dutch shore batteries fired on the attackers.

Then on 10 July Circe was a part of a small squadron consisting of Jalouse, Espiegle, Courier, Pylades, and the hired armed cutter Nancy, all under Winthrop's command. The boats of the squadron rowed for 15 or 16 hours into the Watt at the back of Ameland. There they captured three merchant vessels carrying sugar, wine and brandy, and destroyed a galliot loaded with ordnance and stores.

Between 18 July and 1 August, Circe, Pylades, Espiegle, Courier, and Nancy captured Marguerita Sophia, Twee Gesister, Twee Gebroders, Twee Gebroders, Jussrow Maria Christina, Vrow Henterje Marguaritha, Stadt Oldenburg, Vrow Antje, Vrow Gesina, Endraght, and Frederick. (Note: The prize money to an able seaman on Circe for these vessels amounted to £6 14s.)

On 28 August 1799, Circe was at the Nieuwe Diep. There she took possession of 13 men-of-war, ranging in size from 66 guns to 24, and three Indiamen. She also took possession of the Naval Arsenal and its 95 pieces of ordnance. This was all part of the Vlieter Incident, the surrender without a fight of a squadron of the navy of the Batavian Republic, commanded by Rear-Admiral Samuel Story, during the Anglo-Russian invasion of Holland to the British navy on a sandbank near the Channel known as De Vlieter, near Wieringen, on 30 August. (Note: Prize money for the vessels captured on 28 August was paid to the fleet in February 1802. A sixth-class share, that of an ordinary seaman, was worth 6s 8d.) (Note: Prize money for the vessels captured on 30 August was paid in November 1802.)

More modestly, on 15 September Circe captured Frau Maria Decelice.

On 9 October Circe's boats captured the corvette or "Ship of War" Lynx and the schooner Perseus at the port of Delfzel on the River Ems. Lynx was armed with 12 guns and had a crew of 75 men; Perseus had eight guns and a crew of 40 men. Although the Dutch vessels' guns were loaded and primed, the Dutch apparently did not put up any resistance. The cutters Hawke and Nancy shared in the prize money.

In January 1800 Captain Isaac Wooley assumed command of Circe. On 25 June she and Venus captured the Danish vessel Carolina, which was carrying a cargo of wine from Bordeaux to Bremen.

On 17 July Circe, together with Tromp, Venus, left Portsmouth with a convoy to the West Indies.

Between 3 August and 1 January 1801, Circe captured a number of small prizes on the Jamaica station.

- English schooner Success, of 60 tons;
- American schooner Automaton, of 60 tons, carrying cordage and lead;
- Spanish schooner Susannah, of 60 tons'
- American schooner Scorpion, of 100 tons, carrying coffee;
- French schooner Hussar, of 15 tons carrying old iron;
- Spanish sloop Mexicana, of 20 tons;
- American schooner Assistance, of 110 tons, carrying coffee; and,
- French privateer schooner Secrisua, of 90 tons.

In July 1802 Captain J. Hayes replace Wooley.

== Fate ==
Captain Charles Fielding assumed command in June 1803. On 16 November 1803, Circe was sailing to return to her station on the blockade of France after gales had driven her into the North Sea. At 3pm she struck the Lemon and Ower sandbank. Although she was able to get over the bank, she lost her rudder and her hull started to let in water. By 2am on 17 November she was able to anchor and daylight revealed that she was off the coast of Norfolk. Several fishing vessels came out of Yarmouth to help. She took the captains of two of them on board as pilots, and towing their boats, sailed for the port. However, the weather had not improved and, despite her crew's efforts at the pumps, the water in her kept rising. Fielding decided to abandon ship and at 7pm her crew transferred to the fishing vessels. The subsequent court martial blamed inaccuracies in Circe's navigation charts for her loss.
