= HMS Crescent (1784) =

Fifth-rate frigate of the Royal Navy

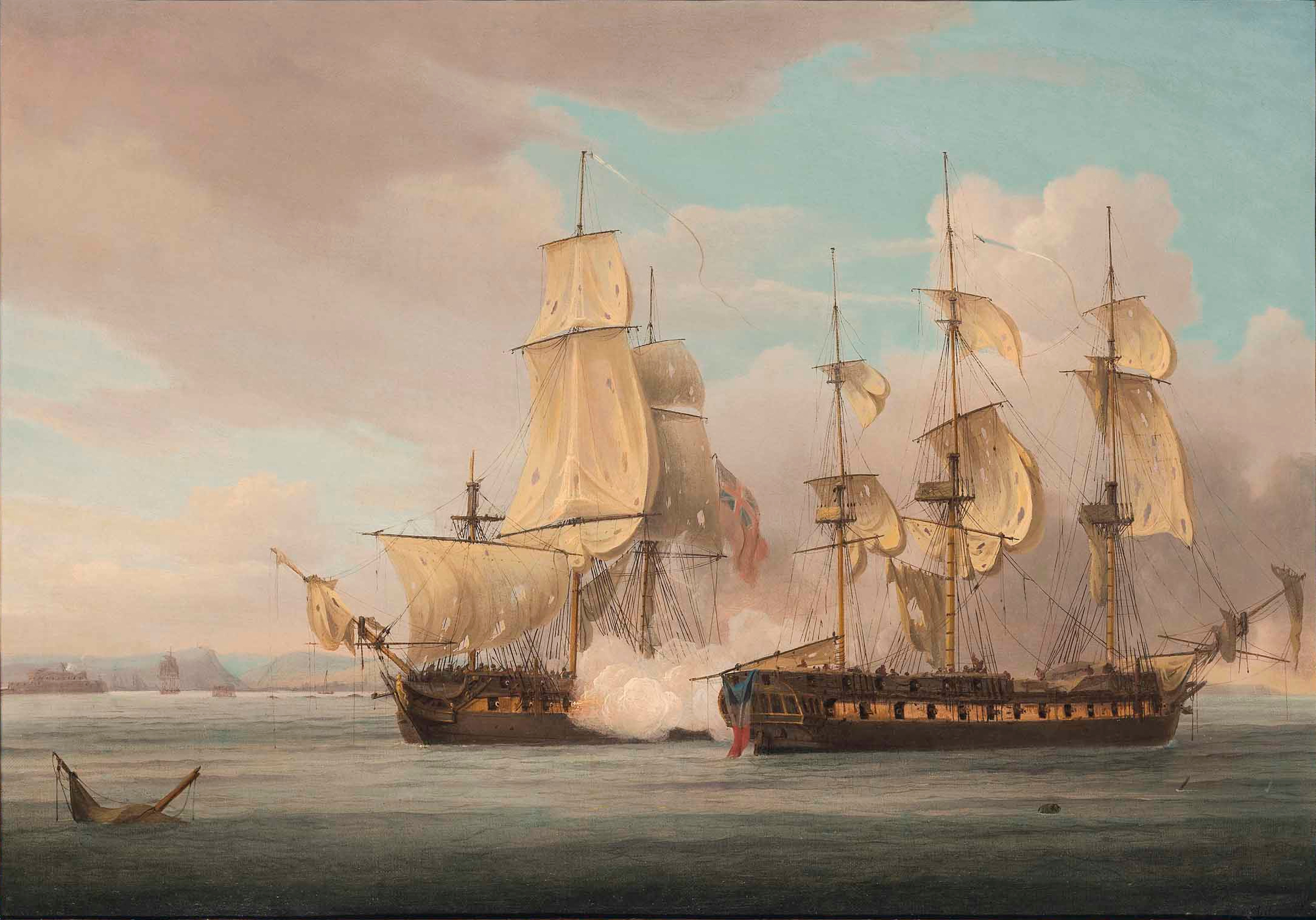
- Crescent (left) at the action of 20 October 1793

History

Great Britain
- Name: HMS Crescent
- Ordered: 11 August 1781
- Builder: John Nowlan and Thomas Calhoun, Bursledon
- Laid down: November 1781
- Launched: 28 October 1784
- Commissioned: May 1790
- Fate: Wrecked on 6 December 1808

General characteristics As built
- Class & type: Flora-Class (36-gun frigate)
- Tons burthen: 88785/94 (bm)
- Length: 137 feet 2 1/2 inches (41.821 m) (overall)
- Beam: 38 feet 5 1/25 inches (11.710 m)
- Depth: 13 feet 3 1/2 inches (4.051 m)
- Propulsion: Sails
- Sail plan: Full-rigged ship
- Armament: Gun deck = 26 × 18-pounder guns; QD = 8 × 9-pounder gun + 4 × 18-pounder carronades; Fc = 2 × 9-pounder gun + 4 × 18-pounder carronades

HMS Crescent was a 36-gun Flora-class fifth-rate frigate of the Royal Navy. Launched in 1784, Crescent spent the first years of the French Revolutionary Wars on blockade duties in the English Channel, during which she captured the French frigate Réunion in the action of 20 October 1793. On 17 August 1795, Crescent was part of a British fleet under Vice-Admiral of the Blue Sir George Elphinstone which forced the surrender of a Batavian Navy squadron at the capitulation of Saldanha Bay. After being sent to the West Indies in April 1799, Crescent returned to Europe in February 1806 during the Napoleonic Wars and was wrecked off the coast of Jutland on 6 December 1808.

== Background ==
Britain's early preference for smaller warships was mainly because of a requirement to maintain a large navy and to keep the expense of doing so down. However, by the latter half of the 1770s, Britain was facing a war with France, Spain and the United States of America, and was in need of a more powerful type of frigate. In 1778, the Navy Board ordered the first of two new types of frigate, the Minerva-class of 38 guns, and the Flora-class of 36 guns. For both 18-pounder guns comprised the main battery. Crescent was ordered on 11 August 1781 and was to be of the 36-gun variety.

== Construction ==
Built by John Nowlan and Thomas Calhoun of Bursledon, Hampshire, Crescent was 137 feet 2.5 inches (41.821 m) along her gun deck, had a 38 feet 5 1/2 inches (11.722 m) beam and a depth in the hold of 13 feet 3 1/2 inches (4.051 m). This gave her a burthen of 887 85/94 tons (bm). Launched on 28 October 1784, she was completed in January the following year, including copper sheathing of the hull, and was taken to Portsmouth where she was laid up in ordinary and not fitted for sea until 6 June 1790. Crescent was armed with a 26-gun main battery of 18-pounders on her gun deck, eight 9-pound guns and four 18-pound carronades on her quarterdeck, and two 9-pound guns and four 18-pound carronades on her fo'c'sle.

== Career ==
Initially commissioned under Captain William Young in May 1790, she was recommissioned in January 1793 under James Saumarez. She joined Rear-Admiral John MacBride's squadron on blockade duty in the English Channel and on 22 June, assisted by HMS Hind and a privateer named Lively, captured the 10-gun French privateer, le Chib de Cherbourg. Later that month, Hind and Crescent also took a 12-gun privateer called L'Espoir. Crescent narrowly avoided capture when on 8 June 1793 she evaded the 50-gun French ships, Le Scévola and Le Brutus.

=== Action of 20 October 1793 ===
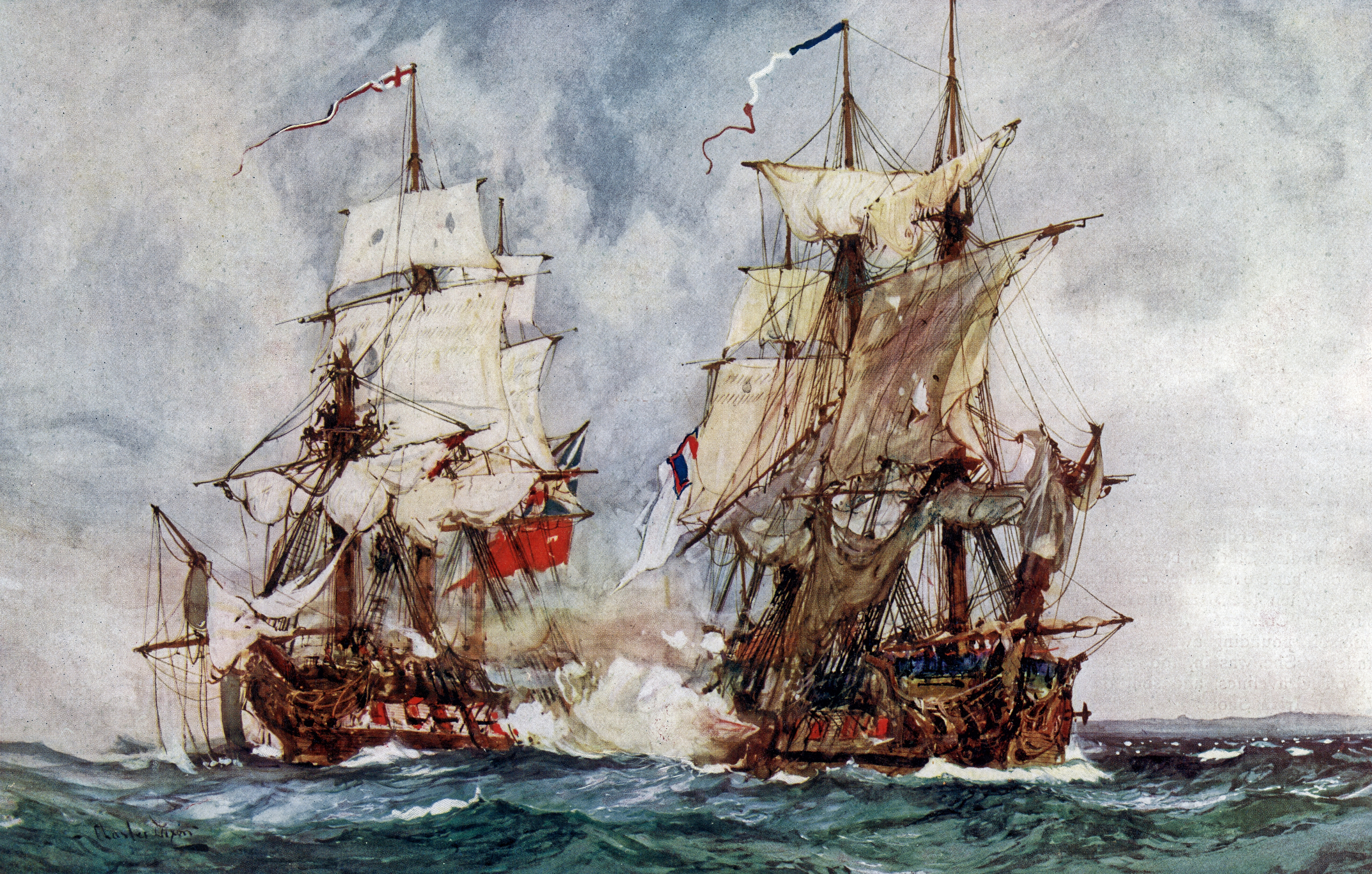
Crescent (left) at the action of 20 October 1793

On the morning of 20 October 1793, lookouts on board Crescent reported sails off Cape Barfleur, on the Cotentin Peninsula, heading towards Cherbourg. Saumarez set a course to intercept, and with the wind in his favour, soon came up on the port side of the two vessels which proved to be the 38-gun French frigate La Réunion and a 14-gun cutter named Espérance, returning from a raiding cruise in the Channel under the command of Captain François A. Dénian.

A second British frigate, the 28-gun HMS Circe, was becalmed some 9 nautical miles (17 km) away and Espérance fled towards Cherbourg, leaving Réunion and Crescent to engage alone. Although the French ship was bigger, 951 long tons (966 t) compared to 888 long tons (902 t), and carried a larger crew; the British ship had a slight advantage in weight of shot, 315 pounds (143 kg) to 310 pounds (141 kg) and was marginally faster.

After the opening exchanges, Réunion lost her fore yard and mizzen topmast while Crescent lost the top off her foremast. Both ships had rigging cut and a number of sails damaged, but Crescent was still able to manoeuvre across Réunion's stern and rake her. This raking caused huge damage to the French ship and her crew, and although Réunion continued to resist for some time, she was no longer able to move effectively. With Saumarez about to cross his bow and Circe now rapidly approaching due to a strengthening wind, Dénian realised he had no choice but to surrender his vessel. The engagement had lasted two hours and ten minutes, during which time the cutter, Espérance, managed to escape to Cherbourg. The French frigate Sémillante, which had been anchored in the harbour, was unable to come to Réunion's rescue because of contrary wind and tides.

=== Capitulation of Saldanha Bay ===
In 1795, Crescent was commanded by Edward Buller and on 7 March 1796 she made for the Cape of Good Hope. As part of a squadron commanded by George Elphinstone, she was present at Saldanha Bay where a squadron of the new Batavian Republic capitulated. The Cape had long been important to Britain's marine traffic, providing a convenient stopping point en route to India. In the previous year, fearing that it may fall into the hands of the French, Britain had captured the colony from the Dutch. The following year (1796) the Dutch sent a squadron under the command of Rear-Admiral Engelbertus Lucas to recapture the Cape. Keith's ships trapped the Dutch in Saldanha Bay on 17 August and Lucas was forced to surrender without a fight.

Crescent remained stationed at the Cape and in 1797 she was under the command of Captain John Murray. Murray was superseded by Captain John Spranger in February 1798, then Charles Brisbane in June that same year.

=== West Indies ===
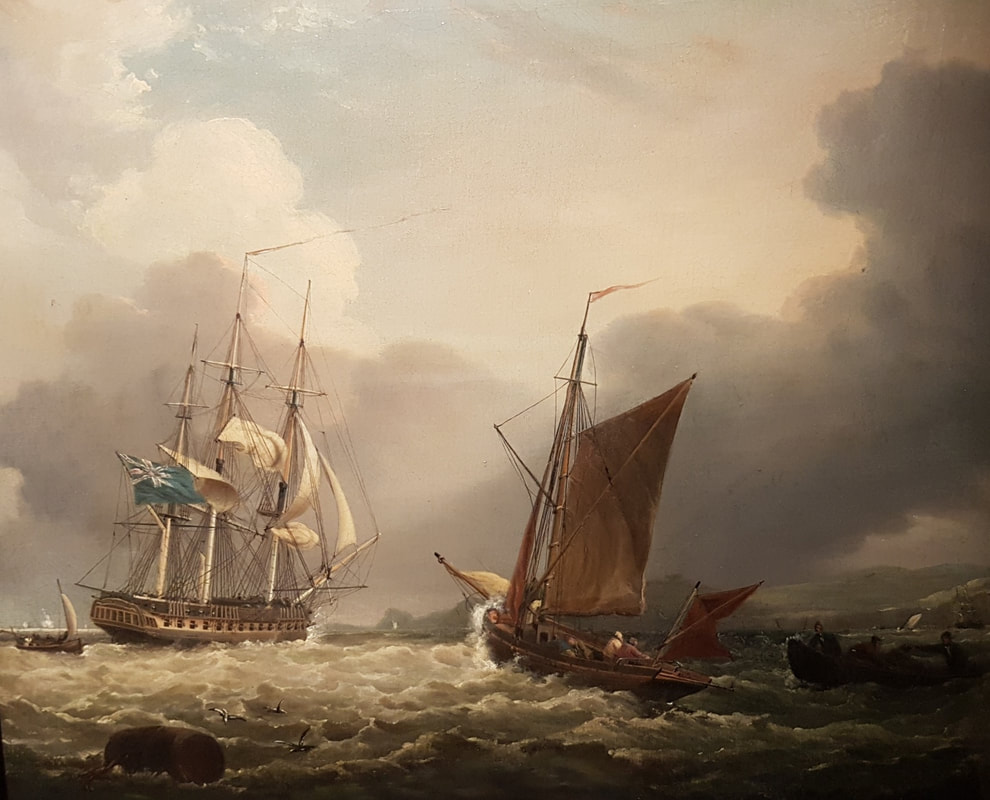
1805 painting of Crescent (left) off the Devon coast

Crescent was repaired and refitted at Deptford in August 1798, re-commissioned under William Lobb in April 1799 and sent to the West Indies. In November, while en route, she captured the 16-gun El Galgo. Then while serving on the Jamaica station, in July 1800 Crescent took the 12-gun French corvette Diligente, which the Royal Navy took into service as a 14-gun transport under her existing name.

Between 21 May and 8 August, Crescent, Meleager, and Nimrod captured two Spanish vessels: a felucca that was sailing from Havana to Veracruz, and a xebec sailing from Campeche to Havana. Captain Lennox Thompson took command of Crescent in July 1802 and in June the following year, Crescent was recommissioned under Lord William Stuart.

=== Return to home waters ===
Crescent returned to home waters in February 1806, under Captain James Carthew. She served in the North Sea before undergoing repairs between June and October 1808. Recommissioned under George Reynolds in April 1808 she remained in home waters and passed to Captain John Temple, who was in command when Crescent was wrecked off the coast of Jutland on 6 December. More than 200 people died as a result, including Temple himself.
