= Thomas Saumarez =

General Sir Thomas Saumarez
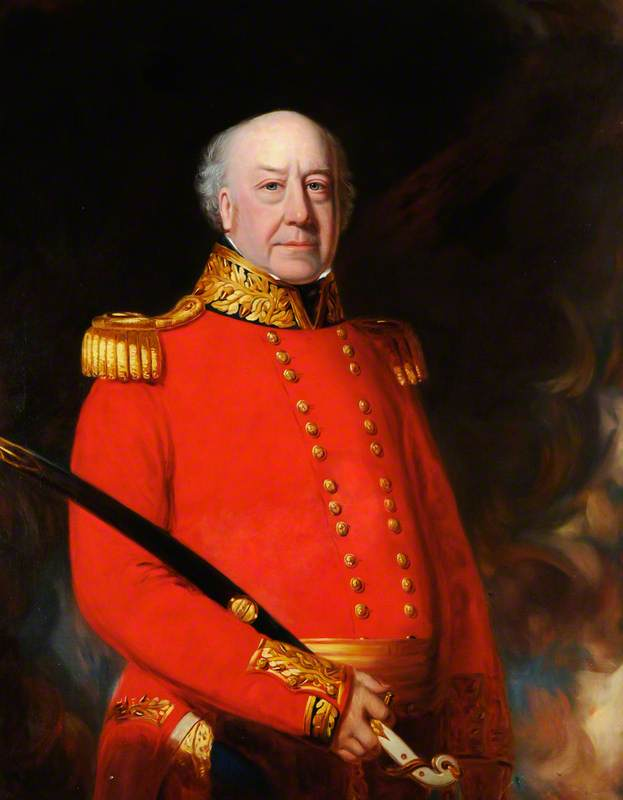
- Born: 1 June 1760; Guernsey
- Died: 4 March 1845 (aged 84); Guernsey
- Relatives: Harriet Brock (m. 1787–1845)
- Military career
- Allegiance: United Kingdom
- Branch: British Army
- Service years: 1776–1845
- Rank: General
- Conflicts: American Revolutionary War; Siege of Charleston; Siege of Yorktown

General Sir Thomas Saumarez (1 July 1760 – 4 March 1845) was a British Army officer who served in the American Revolutionary War.

== Early life: 1760–1776 ==
Thomas Saumarez was born in Guernsey on 1 July 1760 to Matthew Saumarez (1718–1778) and Cartaret Le Marchant. He was the youngest of four. His brothers were Admiral James Saumarez, 1st Baron de Saumarez (1757–1836) and Richard Saumarez (1764–1835), a surgeon and medical author.

== Remainder: 1776–1845 ==
Saumarez entered the British Army in 1776 where he fought in the American Revolutionary War (1775–1783). He fought in the Siege of Charleston (1780). On 15 March 1781 Saumarez commanded one wing of the Royal Welch Fusiliers in the Battle of Guilford Court House. In October later that year, he was captured at the Siege of Yorktown.

In 1787, he married Harriet Brock. In 1793, he was made Brigade major of the Guernsey military. In 1795, he was knighted by the Prince of Wales and promoted to Quartermaster-General to the Forces. In 1799, he was the main inspector of the Guernsey military. In 1811, he was promoted to Major General. From 1812 to 1814, he was the commander of the garrison in Halifax. In 1813, he was the president and commander in chief of New Brunswick. He was promoted to General in 1838. Saumarez died in 1845.
