= Action of 20 October 1793 =

1793 action of the War of the First Coalition

Coordinates: 49.667611°N 1.252417°W

- Part of the War of the First Coalition
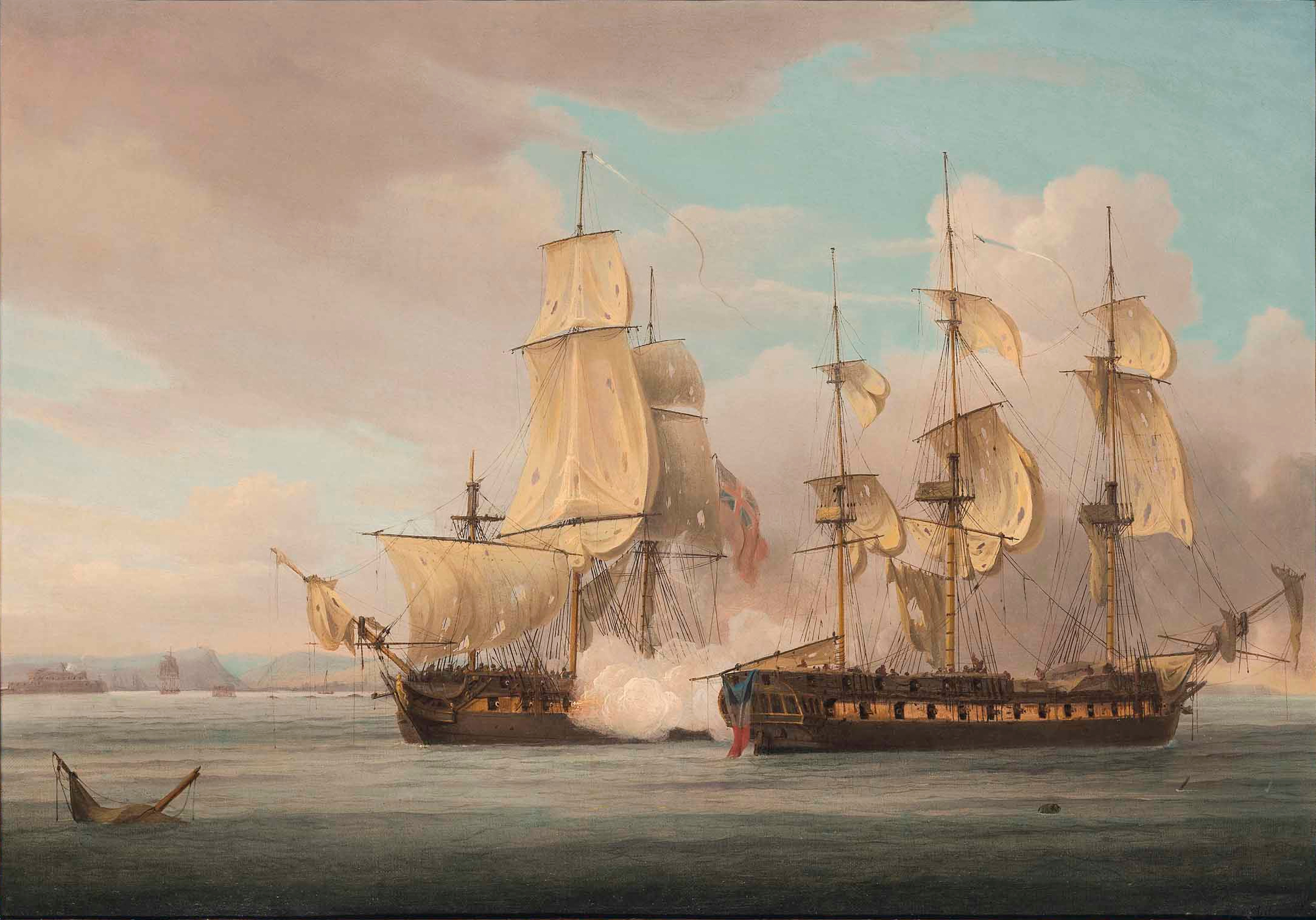
- Painting of the action by Thomas Whitcombe
Date	20 October 1793
Location	Off Cape Barfleur, English Channel
Result	British victory

Belligerents
Great Britain	France

Commanders and leaders
James Saumarez	François Dénian

Strength
2 frigates	1 frigate 1 cutter

Casualties and losses
1 wounded	33 killed 48 wounded 1 frigate captured

The action of 20 October 1793 was fought off Cape Barfleur in the English Channel during the War of the First Coalition. The early months of the year had seen a number of French frigates raiding British merchant shipping in the Channel, and HMS Crescent under Captain James Saumarez was deployed to watch the port of Cherbourg-en-Cotentin with the aim of disrupting the operations of the French frigates Réunion and Sémillante that were based in the harbour. On 20 October, Saumarez was waiting off Cape Barfleur for French movement when his lookout sighted Réunion and the cutter Espérance approaching from open water.

Saumarez immediately moved to engage the French ship and managed to isolate the frigate and subject it to a fierce barrage of fire for more than two hours. Captain François A. Dénian on Réunion responded, but aside from inflicting minor damage to Saumarez's rigging achieved little while his own vessel was heavily battered, suffering severe damage to rigging masts and hull and more than 80 and possibly as many as 120 casualties. British losses were confined to a single man wounded by an accident aboard Crescent. Eventually Dénian could not hold out any longer and was forced to surrender on the arrival of the 28-gun British frigate HMS Circe. Réunion was later repaired and commissioned into the Royal Navy, while Saumarez was knighted for his success.

== Background ==
When Revolutionary France declared war on Great Britain on 1 February 1793, the War of the First Coalition had been going on for almost a year. The French Navy was already suffering from the upheavals of the French Revolution and the consequent dissolution of the professional officer class, while the Royal Navy had been at a state of readiness since the summer of 1792. During the early months of the war the French Navy focused heavily on raiding and disrupting British commerce and deployed frigates on raiding operations against British commercial shipping. In the English Channel, two of the most successful raiders were the frigates Réunion and Sémillante, based in Cherbourg on the Cotentin Peninsula. These frigates would make short cruises, leaving Cherbourg in the early evening and returning in the morning with any prizes they had encountered during the night.

To counter the depredations from Cherbourg, the Admiralty despatched a number of warships to blockade the French coast, including the 36-gun frigate HMS Crescent under Captain James Saumarez, which was sent from Portsmouth to the Channel Islands before operating off the Cotentin. On 19 October, Saumarez learned of the French routine and took up a station close inshore near Cape Barfleur, a rocky headland on the eastern extremity of the Cotentin Peninsula which the Cherbourg raiders passed whenever leaving or entering port. At dawn on 20 October lookouts on Crescent reported two sails approaching the land from the Channel, one significantly larger than the other. Saumarez immediately ordered his ship to edge into the wind towards the strange vessels and rapidly came up on the port side of the new arrivals, with the wind behind him allowing freedom of movement.

== Battle ==
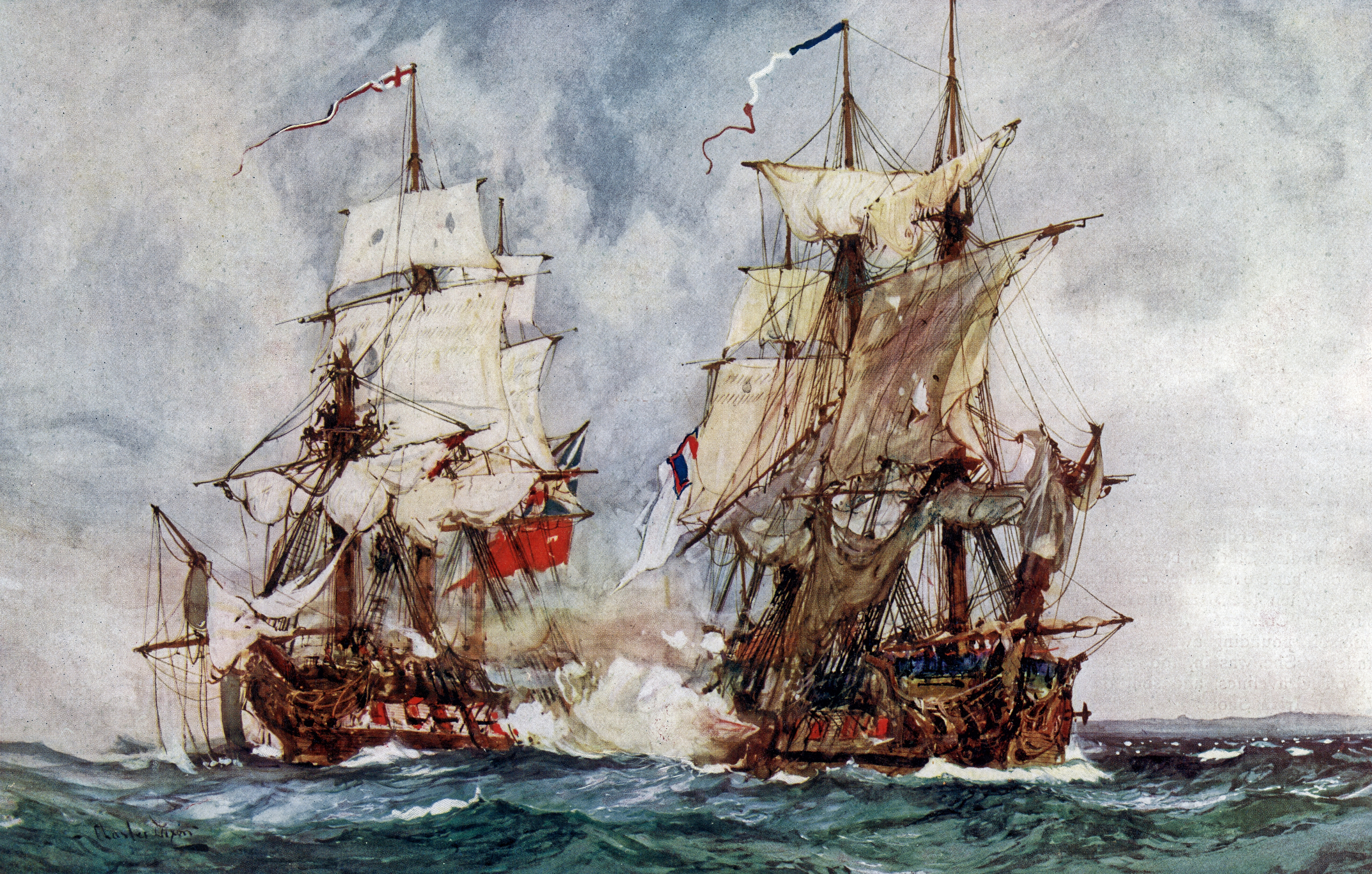
Illustration of Crescent engaging Réunion by Charles Dixon

The two ships encountered by Crescent were the 38-gun frigate Réunion and a 14-gun cutter named Espérance, returning from a raiding cruise in the Channel under the command of Captain François A. Dénian (in some sources Déniau). Réunion was a substantially larger ship than Crescent, weighing 951 long tons (966 t) to the British ship's 888 long tons (902 t) and carrying 300 men to Crescent's 257. However, these advantages were countered by the slight advantage Saumarez held in weight of shot, which measured 315 pounds (143 kg) to 310 pounds (141 kg) in favour of the British vessel. Crescent was also faster than Réunion, having only recently completed a dockyard refit.

Firing broke out between the frigates at 10:30, while the cutter steered away from the battle towards Cherbourg. One other ship was visible throughout the engagement, the 28-gun British frigate HMS Circe under Captain Joseph Sydney Yorke, which lay stranded approximately 9 nautical miles (17 km) distant, unable to approach the battling ships due to calm winds separating Circe from the engagement. In the opening exchanges, both frigates suffered damage to their rigging and sails, Crescent losing the fore topmast and Réunion the fore yard and mizzen topmast. In an effort to break the deadlock, Saumarez suddenly swung his ship onto the opposite tack and, taking advantage of the damage to Dénian's vessel that left it unable to effectively manoeuvre, managed to fire several raking broadsides into Réunion's stern.

The raking fire inflicted massive damage and casualties on the French ship, and although Dénian continued to resist for some time, his ship was no longer effectively able to respond once Saumarez had crossed his bow. Eventually, with Circe now rapidly approaching with a strengthening of the wind, Dénian accepted that he had no choice but to surrender his vessel after an engagement lasting two hours and ten minutes. The cutter, which had been ignored during the battle, successfully escaped to Cherbourg while the captain of Sémillante, anchored in the harbour, made a fruitless effort to reach the engagement, delayed by contrary wind and tides that prevented the frigate from sailing.

== Aftermath ==
Both ships were damaged in the engagement, although Saumarez's damage was almost entirely confined to his rigging: very few shots had actually struck his hull during the battle, and the only one that provoked notice passed across the deck without causing injury and struck a cannon on the opposite site, setting it off in the direction of a number of small gunboats that were approaching from the shore. Casualties on Crescent were equally light, with just one man injured; he had been standing too close to his own cannon during the opening broadside and had been struck by the recoiling gun, suffering a broken leg. Damage and losses on the French ship were very severe, with the rigging in tatters, the hull and lower masts repeatedly struck and casualties that Saumarez initially estimated at more than 120 men killed or wounded, although French accounts give the lower figure of 33 killed and 48 wounded.

Saumarez was widely praised for his conduct in only the second successful frigate action of the war after Edward Pellew's capture of Cléopâtre four months earlier at the action of 18 June 1793. In reward, Saumarez was knighted by King George III and given a presentation plate by the City of London, although Saumarez later received a bill for £103 6s and 8d (the equivalent of £12,900 as of 2025), from a Mr. Cooke for "the honour of a knighthood". Saumarez refused to pay, telling Cooke to charge whoever had paid for Edward Pellew's knighthood after his successful action. Saumarez later wrote to his brother that "I think it hard to pay so much for an honour which my services have been thought to deserve". In recognition of his success, Saumarez was subsequently given command of a frigate squadron operating against the Normandy coast from the Channel Islands. In addition, the first lieutenant, George Parker, was promoted to commander and the two other lieutenants were also praised. Réunion was purchased for service with the Royal Navy after repairs had been completed, and became HMS Reunion, rated as a 36-gun frigate carrying 12-pounder cannon. Authorisation for the payment of prize money was published in the London Gazette on 4 February 1794, amounting to £5,239 (the equivalent of £602,600 as of 2025) divided between the men of Crescent and Circe. More than five decades later the battle was among the actions recognised by a clasp attached to the Naval General Service Medal, awarded upon application to all British participants from Crescent still living in 1847.

== Bibliography ==
- Clowes, William Laird (1997) [1900]. The Royal Navy, A History from the Earliest Times to 1900, Volume IV. Chatham Publishing. ISBN 1-86176-013-2.
- Gardiner, Robert, ed. (2001) [1996]. Fleet Battle and Blockade. Caxton Editions. ISBN 1-84067-363-X.
- James, William (2002) [1827]. The Naval History of Great Britain, Volume 1, 1793–1796. Conway Maritime Press. ISBN 0-85177-905-0.
- Wareham, Tom (2001). The Star Captains, Frigate Command in the Napoleonic Wars. Chatham Publishing. ISBN 1-86176-169-4.
- Woodman, Richard (2001). The Sea Warriors. Constable Publishers. ISBN 1-84119-183-3.
