= French frigate Réunion =

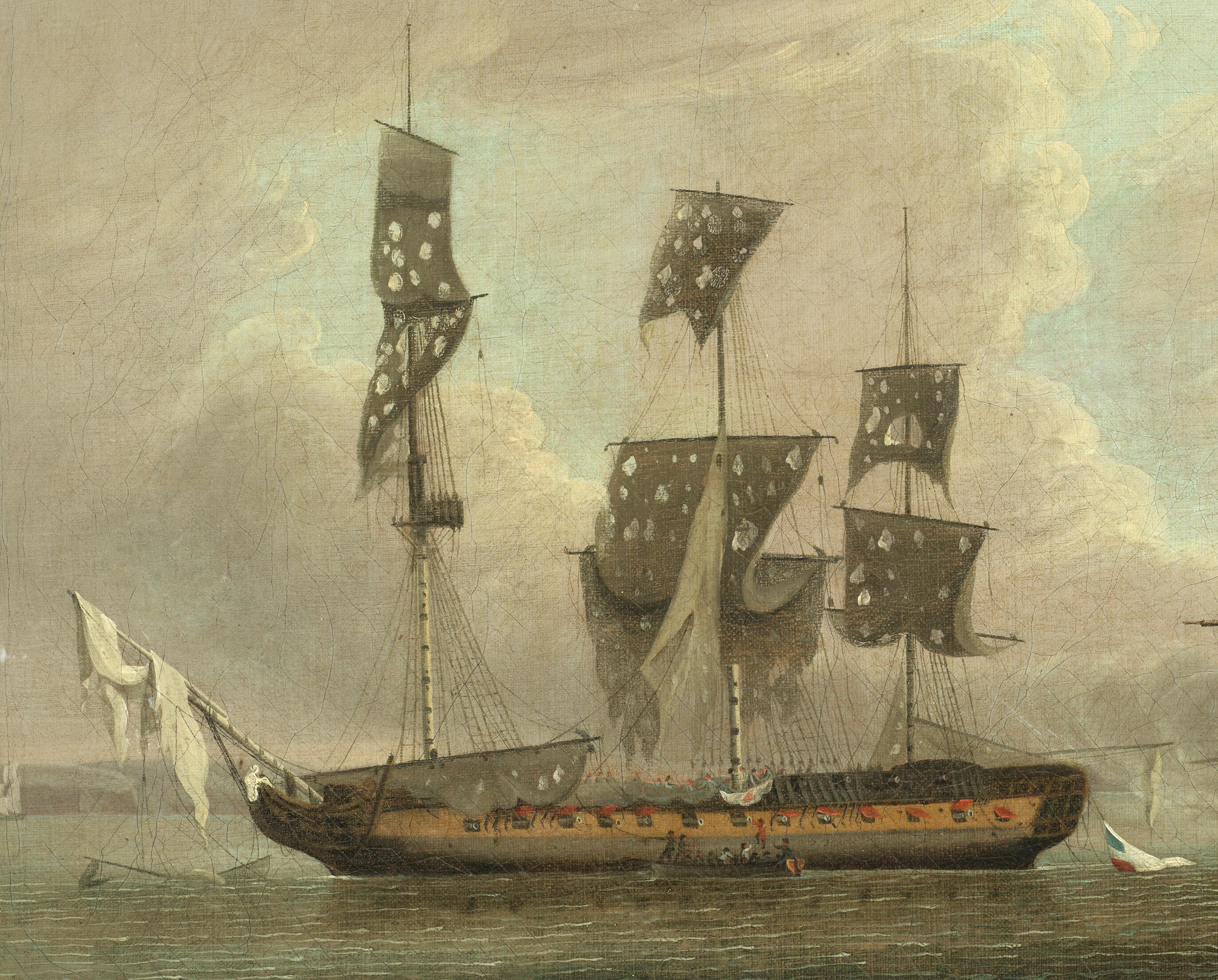
- Réunion at the action of 20 October 1793

History

France
- Name: Réunion
- Laid down: February 1785
- Launched: 23 February 1786
- Completed: January 1787
- Captured: 20 October 1793

Great Britain
- Name: HMS Reunion
- Fate: Wrecked

General characteristics
- Displacement: 1,100 tonneaux
- Tons burthen: 600 port tonneaux; 951 43/94bm
- Length: 144 feet (44 m) (gundeck)
- Beam: 38 ft 10 1/2 in (11.8 m)
- Depth: 12 ft 1 in (3.7 m)
- Sail plan: Full-rigged ship
- Complement: French service:267-285
- Armament: French service; Gundeck:26 × 12-pounder guns; Spardeck:6 × 6-pounder guns; British service; Gundeck: 26 × 12-pounder guns; QD: 8 × 6-pounder guns; Fc: 2 × 6-pounder guns

Réunion was a 36-gun frigate of the French Navy launched in 1786. During the French Revolutionary Wars she was stationed at Cherbourg and was successfully employed harassing British merchant shipping in the English Channel until the British captured her off the Cotentin Peninsula during the action of 20 October 1793. Renamed HMS Reunion, she served for three years in the Royal Navy helping to counter the threat from the new Batavian Navy, before she was wrecked in the Thames Estuary in December 1796.

== Construction ==
Réunion was built at Toulon between February 1785 and January 1787. She was one of a further five ships built to Joseph-Marie-Blaise Coulomb's 1777 design for the Magicienne-class frigates. Réunion was launched on 23 February 1786.

== French career ==
On 20 April 1792 the Legislative Assembly voted for war with Austria thus starting a conflict which would become known as the French Revolutionary War. France declared war on Britain on 1 February 1793 and began to focus heavily on the disruption of British commerce through the deployment of frigates on raiding operations against British commercial shipping. In the English Channel, two of the most successful raiders were the frigates Réunion and Sémillante, both then based in Cherbourg on the Cotentin Peninsula. These frigates would make short cruises, leaving Cherbourg in the early evening and returning in the morning with any prizes they had encountered during the night.

=== Action of 20 October 1793 ===
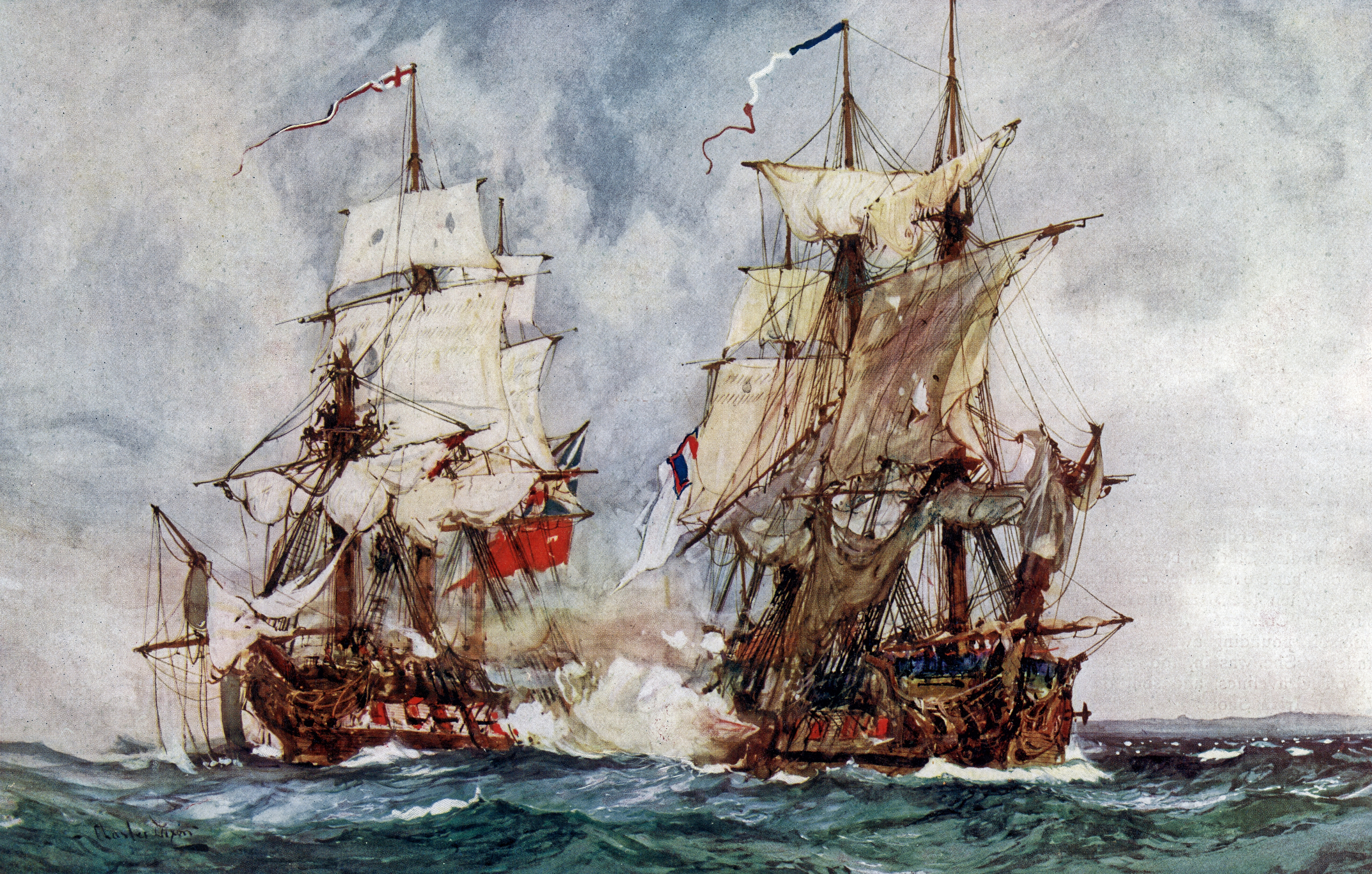
Illustration of Crescent engaging Réunion by Charles Dixon

The British response to the French raids was to attempt a blockade of the French coast, and to that end, despatched a number of vessels including the 36-gun frigate HMS Crescent, under Captain James Saumarez. On the morning of 20 October, Réunion, under the command of Captain François Dénian, and a 14-gun cutter, the Espérance, were returning from a cruise when they were spotted by Crescent. A second British frigate, the 28-gun HMS Circe, was becalmed some 9 nautical miles (17 km) away and Espérance fled towards Cherbourg, leaving Réunion to engage Crescent alone. Although Réunion was bigger, 951 long tons (966 t) compared to 888 long tons (902 t), and carried a larger crew; Crescent had a slight advantage in weight of shot, 315 pounds (143 kg) to 310 pounds (141 kg) and was marginally faster.

After the opening exchanges, Réunion had lost her fore yard and mizzen topmast while Crescent had lost the top off her foremast. Both ships had rigging cut and a number of sails damaged but Crescent was still able to manoeuvre across Réunion's stern and rake her. This raking caused huge damage to the French ship and her crew, and although Réunion continued to resist for some time, she was no longer able to move effectively. With Saumarez about to cross his bow and Circe now rapidly approaching due to a strengthening wind, Dénian realised he had no choice but to surrender his vessel. The engagement had lasted two hours and ten minutes during which time the cutter Espérance managed to escape to Cherbourg. The French frigate Sémillante, which had been anchored in the harbour, was unable to come to Réunion's rescue because of contrary wind and tides.

== British career ==
The captured ship was taken to Portsmouth where she was fitted out and finally registered as a British warship in May 1794. In the winter of 1794/5, France gained control of what was then the Dutch Republic and captured the Dutch fleet which had been frozen in harbour. Reunion was sent to become part of a newly formed British fleet to be stationed at Great Yarmouth and intended to oppose the threat from the new Batavian Navy. Captain James Almes took command of Reunion in July 1795 and on 22 August led a small squadron that captured the Dutch ship Alliance in the North Sea.

=== Action of 22 August 1795 ===
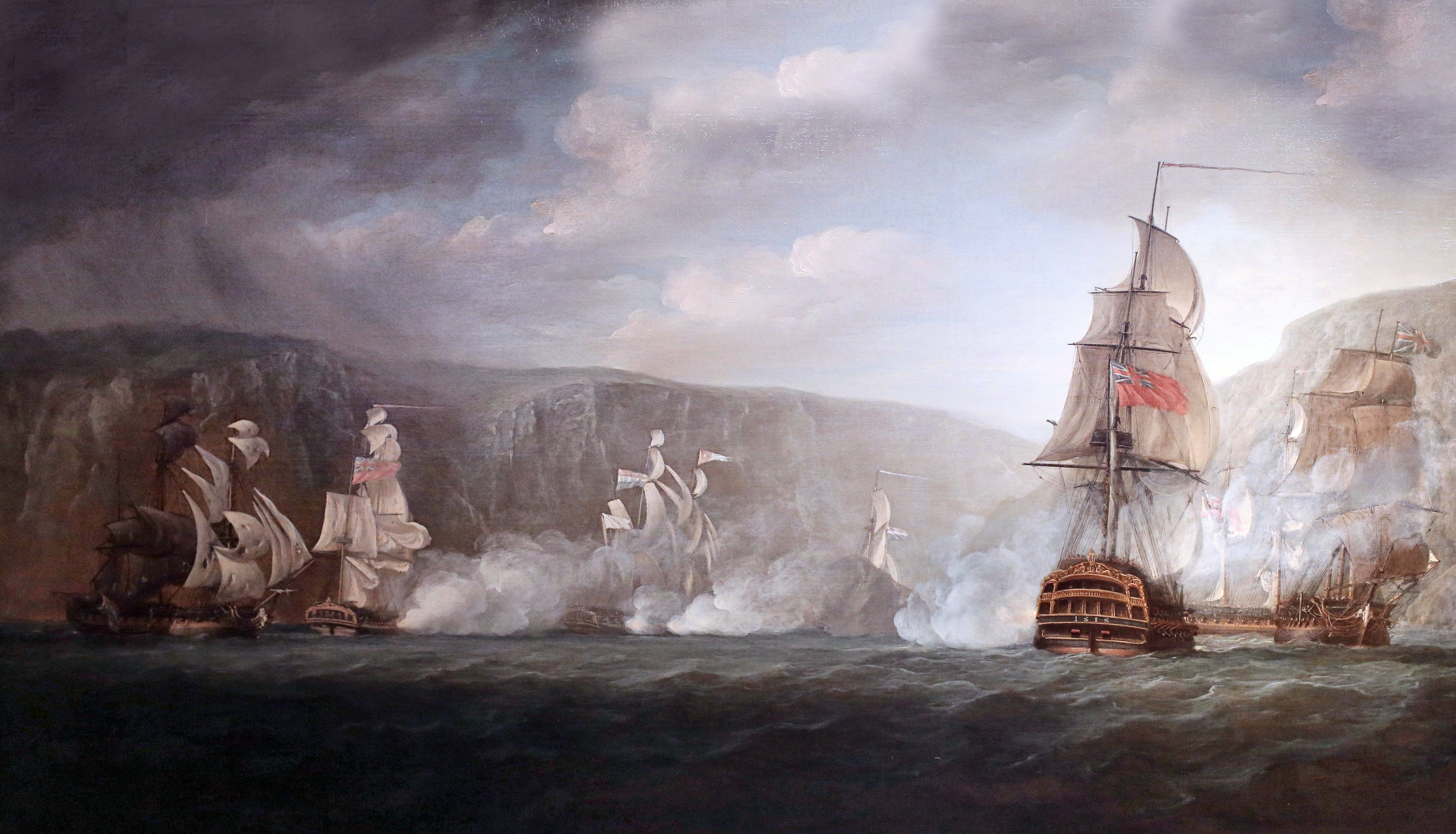
The Action of 22 August 1795 by Nicholas Pocock

Reunion put to sea on 8 August in the company of HMS Isis, 50 guns, and Vestal, 28 guns, and on 12 August they were joined by another frigate, the 32-gun HMS Stag. On the 22nd, the squadron, under Almes orders, was cruising off the coast of Norway when at around 1300hrs, it spotted two ships and a cutter to windward and heading towards shore on a larboard tack. These ships proved to be the 36-gun frigates, Alliance and Argo, and the 16-gun cutter, Vlugheld. A favourable wind change allowed Stag to overhaul the rear most ship, Alliance, and bring her to action at about 1615hrs while the remaining British ships engaged in a running battle with Argo and Vlugheld. After an hour's fighting, Stag managed to force the surrender of her larger opponent but Argo, despite suffering much damage, and Vlugheld escaped into port at 1730hrs.

=== Later career ===
HMS Reunion remained on blockade duty in the North Sea for the rest of her career. In July 1796, command of HMS Reunion passed to Acting Captain William Hotham and then to Captain Henry William Bayntun who accidentally wrecked the ship on the Sunk Sand in the Thames Estuary on 7 December 1796. Bayntun and his entire crew survived and were later exonerated of blame for the loss of the ship.
