= Lord Eldon (disambiguation) =

Lord Eldon May refer to

== People ==
- Lord Eldon, L.C. (1751 – 1838) 1st Earl of Eldon, PC, QC, FRS, FSA

== Ships ==
- Lord Eldon (ship)
- Lord Eldon (1801 ship)
- Lord Eldon (1802 EIC ship)
- Lord Eldon (1824 ship)
- Lord Eldon (1830 ship)

== Title ==
- Earl of Eldon (1821) title created for Lord Eldon
