= Lord Eldon (ship) =

Several ships have been named Lord Eldon for John Scott, 1st Earl of Eldon.

- Lord Eldon (1801 ship) was launched at Sunderland. She was initially a London-based transport, but new owners contracted with the Admiralty. From certainly 1804 through approximately 1811 she served the British Royal Navy as a hired armed ship. During this period Spanish vessels captured her, but the Royal Navy recaptured her. Between 1812 and 1813 she underwent lengthening. In 1814 she returned to serving as a transport. She was driven ashore and damaged in 1817; she was no longer listed in 1819.
- Lord Eldon (1802 EIC ship) was a two-decker East Indiaman, launched in 1802, that made seven voyages as an "extra ship" i.e., under charter, for the British East India Company. Subsequently, she made one voyage to New South Wales transporting convicts. She was last listed in 1819.
- Lord Eldon (1824 ship) was launched at Sunderland. On 20 August 1828 a Brazilian naval squadron burnt her at Buenos Aires.
- Lord Eldon (1830 ship) was launched at Chepstow. She was wrecked on 18 December 1844 at Madras, India.

== See also ==
- Earl of Eldon (1830 ship) was launched at Whitby. Spontaneous combustion in her cargo as she was sailing from Bombay to Britain on 27 September 1834 resulted in her destruction. All aboard took to her boats and survived.
