= List of shipwrecks in December 1844 =

The list of shipwrecks in December 1844 includes ships sunk, foundered, wrecked, grounded, or otherwise lost during December 1844.

== 1 December ==
List of shipwrecks: 1 December 1844
Ship	State	Description
England	United Kingdom	The ship departed from Liverpool, Lancashire for New York, United States. No further trace, presumed foundered with the loss of all hands.

== 2 December ==
List of shipwrecks: 2 December 1844
Ship	State	Description
Anna Maria	Hamburg	The ship sprang a leak and sank in the Pinkegat. Her crew were rescued. She was on a voyage from Great Yarmouth, Norfolk, United Kingdom to Hamburg.
Britannia	(United Kingdom of Great Britain and Ireland) British North America	The schooner was driven ashore at Cape George, Nova Scotia.
Cleopatra	Grand Duchy of Tuscany	The barque foundered off the coast of Cuba. Her crew were rescued. She was on a voyage from New Orleans, Louisiana, United States to Gibraltar.
Eweretta	United Kingdom	The ship ran aground on the Goodwin Sands, Kent. She was on a voyage from Saint John, New Brunswick, British North America to Hull, Yorkshire. She was refloated and made for the North Foreland, Kent.
Frau Gezina	Denmark	The kuff ran aground at "Eitzenloch" and was wrecked. Her crew were rescued.
Lord de Saumarez	United Kingdom	The ship was driven ashore on Dragør, Denmark. She was on a voyage from Stettin to London. She was later refloated and put in to Copenhagen, Denmark.
Tean	United Kingdom	The ship was damaged by fire at London.

== 3 December ==
List of shipwrecks: 3 December 1844
Ship	State	Description
Albion	United Kingdom	The ship was driven ashore at Gunton, Suffolk. Her crew were rescued. She subsequently became a wreck, and was condemned.
Caroline	Bremen	The ship was driven ashore in the Weser. She was on a voyage from Bremen to Great Yarmouth, Norfolk, United Kingdom. She was refloated on 6 December and taken in to Bremen.
Elf Geschwister	Prussia	The ship was driven ashore at Huttoft, Lincolnshire, United Kingdom. Her crew were rescued. She was on a voyage from Memel to London, United Kingdom.
Fidelity	United Kingdom	The ship was driven ashore at North Shields, County Durham. She was refloated the next day and taken in to North Shields.
Iris	United Kingdom	The brig was wrecked at Boulmer, Northumberland. Her crew were rescued by the Boulmer Lifeboat.
Jane	United Kingdom	The brig was wrecked on the Middle Sand, in the North Sea off the coast of Essex. Seven of her nine crew were rescued by the brig Unity (United Kingdom), the other two took to the ship's skiff. She was on a voyage from Newcastle upon Tyne, Northumberland to London. Part of the wreck drove ashore at Warden, Kent on 10 December.
Primer Gaditano	Spain	The steamship was wrecked near Montjuïc. She was on a voyage from Marseille, Bouches-du-Rhône, France to Barcelona.
Rose	United Kingdom	The schooner was in collision with Hebe (United Kingdom) and foundered in the English Channel off Dungeness, Kent. Her crew were rescued. The wreck was towed in to Portsmouth, Hampshire on 5 December by Brunswick (United Kingdom).

== 4 December ==
List of shipwrecks: 4 December 1844
Ship	State	Description
Countess of Lonsdale	United Kingdom	The paddle steamer was damaged by fire at London.
Mathers	United Kingdom	The schooner was driven ashore at Sutton-on-Sea, Lincolnshire. Her crew were rescued. She was on a voyage from Königsberg, Prussia to London.
Merchant	United States	The ship was driven ashore at Lewis, Delaware. She was on a voyage from Philadelphia, Pennsylvania, to Saint John, New Brunswick, British North America. She was refloated on 9 December.
Paolina	Kingdom of Sardinia	The ship was in collision with a Greek brig off Corsica, France and was abandoned. She subsequently drove ashore and was wrecked. The brig sank; five of her crew were rescued. Paolina was on a voyage from Galaţi, Ottoman Empire to Genoa.
Polly	United Kingdom	The ship was driven ashore and wrecked on the west coast of Texel, North Holland, Netherlands. She was on a voyage from Amsterdam, North Holland to Newcastle upon Tyne, Northumberland.
Theadoore Behring	Danzig	The ship was driven ashore east of Newhaven, Sussex, United Kingdom. She was on a voyage from Danzig to Newhaven.

== 5 December ==
List of shipwrecks: 5 December 1844
Ship	State	Description
Jane	United Kingdom	The ship was wrecked on the Barrow Sands, in the North Sea off the coast of Essex. Her crew were rescued. She was on a voyage from Newcastle upon Tyne, Northumberland to London.
Jenny Jones	United Kingdom	The ship ran aground on the Pluckington Bank, in Liverpool Bay. She was on a voyage from Liverpool, Lancashire to Syra, Greece. She was refloated the next day and resumed her voyage.
Port Madoc Packet	United Kingdom	The ship collided with a brig and foundered in the Irish Sea off Holyhead, Anglesey. Her crew were rescued. She was on a voyage from Liverpool to Pwllheli, Caernarfonshire.
Ruby	United Kingdom	The ship ran aground on the Gunfleet Sand, in the North Sea off the coast of Essex. She was on a voyage from Newcastle upon Tyne to London. Ruby was refloated with the assistance of eleven smacks and taken into Harwich, Essex.

== 6 December ==
List of shipwrecks: 6 December 1844
Ship	State	Description
Charlevon	(United Kingdom of Great Britain and Ireland) British North America	The steamship was sunk by ice at Quebec City, Province of Canada. She was on a voyage from Quebec City to Montreal.
Farmer	United Kingdom	The ship was lost off "Whitenhead", Inverness-shire.
Guadaloupe	France	The ship was wrecked near Champaigne Bay. She was on a voyage from Le Moule, Guadeloupe to Santa Ana.
Johanna Sophia	Norway	The sloop ran aground off Læsø, Denmark. She was on a voyage from Frederiksværk, Denmark to Moss. Her crew were rescued. She became a wreck on 8 December.
Preciosa	Hamburg	The ship capsized at Cuxhaven. She was on a voyage from Rio de Janeiro, Brazil to Hamburg.
Terra de Fea	France	The ship was driven ashore at Hartlepool, County Durham, United Kingdom. She was on a voyage from Hartlepool to Marseille, Bouches-du-Rhône. She was refloated.
Union	United Kingdom	The ship was in collision with Magdalena (Hamburg) and foundered off Padstow, Cornwall with the loss of three of her five crew. She was on a voyage from Bristol, Gloucestershire to Goole, Yorkshire.

== 7 December ==
List of shipwrecks: 7 December 1844
Ship	State	Description
Brilliant	United Kingdom	The ship was driven ashore on Guernsey, Channel Islands. She was refloated.
Elizabeth	United Kingdom	The ship was wrecked near Haycock Harbor, Maine, United States. Her crew were rescued. She was on a voyage from Saint John, New Brunswick, British North America to Hull, Yorkshire.
Gerda	Hamburg	The ship was driven ashore on Scharhörn. She was on a voyage from Bordeaux, Gironde, France to Hamburg. She was later refloated.
Obarlevon	(United Kingdom of Great Britain and Ireland) British North America	The steamship was holed by ice and sank at Quebec City, Province of Canada. She was on a voyage from Quebec City to Montreal.
Pansey	United Kingdom	The ship was driven ashore near Redcar, Yorkshire. She was refloated.
Psyche	(United Kingdom of Great Britain and Ireland) Antigua	The dredger, a schooner, struck a rock and sank off Nonsuch Island, Bermuda.
Sackville	United Kingdom	The ship was driven ashore and wrecked near Otranto, Kingdom of the Two Sicilies. She was on a voyage from Trieste to Liverpool, Lancashire.

== 8 December ==
List of shipwrecks: 8 December 1844
Ship	State	Description
Catherine Jackson	United States	The ship was driven ashore on Goeree, Zeeland Netherlands. She was refloated on 16 December and taken in to Hellevoetsluis, Zeeland.
Garnet	United Kingdom	The ship ran aground on the Muschel Scarp, off the coast of County Durham. She was refloated and taken in to South Shields, County Durham.
Hamilton	United Kingdom	The ship was driven ashore near Cape Voltas, Cape Colony. Her crew were rescued.
Hero	United Kingdom	The schooner was wrecked on the Cork Sand, in the North Sea off the coast of Suffolk with the loss of all but one of her seven crew. The survivor was rescued by HMRC Scout ( Board of Customs) Hero was on a voyage from London to Amsterdam, North Holland, Netherlands.
Leila	United States	The ship ran aground on the Bimini Reef. She was on a voyage from Rotterdam, South Holland, Netherlands to New Orleans, Louisiana. She was later refloated and completed her voyage.
Thomas and James	United Kingdom	The ship foundered in the North Sea off Todd's Head. Her crew were rescued by Union Groe (United Kingdom).Thomas and James was on a voyage from Leven, Fife to Dundee, Forfarshire.
Triune	United Kingdom	The ship was driven ashore and severely damaged at Ness Point, Suffolk. She was refloated on 11 December.
William and James	United Kingdom	The ship foundered off Todd's Head. Her crew were rescued. She was on a voyage from Leven, Fife to Dundee, Forfarshire.

== 9 December ==
List of shipwrecks: 9 December 1844
Ship	State	Description
Carron	United Kingdom	The sloop was driven ashore and wrecked at Aberlady, Lothian. She was on a voyage from Leith to Aberlady.
Dyden	United Kingdom	The galeas was driven ashore near "Ulmahlen", Prussia.
Fortuna	United Kingdom	The ship was wrecked on the Barnard Sand, in the North Sea off the coast of Suffolk. Her crew were rescued. She was on a voyage from South Shields, County Durham to London.
Johns	United Kingdom	The ship sprang a leak and was beached at South Shields, County Durham. She was on a voyage from South Shields to King's Lynn, Norfolk.
Remittance	United Kingdom	The ship was severely damaged by fire at New York.

== 10 December ==
List of shipwrecks: 10 December 1844
Ship	State	Description
New Eagle	United Kingdom	The ship ran aground on the Nore. She was on a voyage from Newcastle upon Tyne, Northumberland to London. She was refloated and resumed her voyage.
Solide	Sweden	The ship was driven ashore at Travemünde, Prussia.
Sybil	United Kingdom	The ship ran aground at Kingstown, County Dublin. She was on a voyage from Kingstown to Liverpool, Lancashire. She was refloated and resumed her voyage.

== 11 December ==
List of shipwrecks: 11 December 1844
Ship	State	Description
Ayrshire	United Kingdom	The barque was driven ashore on La Gomera, Canary Isles in a capsized condition and was wrecked.
Charlemagne	United Kingdom	The ship ran aground at the mouth of the Mississippi River. She was on a voyage from New Orleans, Louisiana, United States to Liverpool, Lancashire.
Charles Hartley	United Kingdom	The ship was wrecked at Burgas, Ottoman Empire. Her crew were rescued. She was on a voyage from Odesa to an English port.
Johanna	Prussia	The ship was driven ashore in the Kurisches Haff. She was on a voyage from Middlesbrough, Yorkshire, United Kingdom to Memel.
Svea	Sweden	The brig was driven ashore between "Theddall" and Barna, County Galway, United Kingdom. She was on a voyage from New York, United States to Amsterdam, North Holland, Netherlands.

== 12 December ==
List of shipwrecks: 12 December 1844
Ship	State	Description
Albanian	United States	The ship sprang a leak and foundered in the Atlantic Ocean. Her crew were rescued.
Amity	United Kingdom	The brig was driven ashore on the Isle of Arran. She was on a voyage from Ardrossan, Ayrshire to Saint John, New Brunswick, British North America.
Corner	United Kingdom	The smack was driven ashore near "Carrigholt", County Clare. She was on a voyage from Limerick to Liverpool, Lancashire.
Gazette	United States	The brig capsized with the loss of three of her crew. Survivors were rescued on 6 January 1845 by Tamerlane (United States). Gazette was on a voyage from Bangor, Maine to Port-au-Prince, Haiti.
Harvest	United Kingdom	The brig ran aground on the Cross Sand, in the North Sea off the coast of Norfolk. She was on a voyage from Shoreham-by-Sea, Sussex to Sunderland, County Durham. She was refloated the next day but was driven ashore whilst trying to put in to Great Yarmouth, Norfolk. Her crew were rescued. Harvest was refloated on 18 December and taken in to Great Yarmouth.
Helen Mills	United Kingdom	The ship struck a rock and foundered 6 nautical miles (11 km) off Newburgh, Fife. Her crew were rescued.
Joseph and Fanny	United Kingdom	The ship was driven ashore at "Clay Castle", County Cork. She was on a voyage from Newport, Monmouthshire to Cork.
Lavinia	United Kingdom	The ship ran aground on the Middle Sand, in the Humber. She floated off but consequently foundered.
Meridian	United Kingdom	The ship ran aground on the Middle Sand and was damaged. She was refloated.
Messenger	United Kingdom	The ship was driven ashore at Kilrush, County Clare. She was on a voyage from Clare to London.
Pedestrian	United Kingdom	The ship ran aground at Tynemouth, Northumberland and was damaged. She was refloated and put in to South Shields, County Durham.
Scotia	Bremen	The galiot was driven ashore at Helmsdale, Sutherland, United Kingdom. All seven people on board were rescued. She was on a voyage from Bremen to Speymouth, Morayshire, United Kingdom. Scotia was refloated on 20 December and taken in to Helmsdale in a severely damaged condition.
Scotland	United Kingdom	The East Indiaman was destroyed by fire at Glasgow, Renfrewshire.
Waterlily	United Kingdom	The ship was driven ashore at Broadstairs, Kent. She was on a voyage from London to Jamaica. She was refloated and resumed her voyage.

== 13 December ==
List of shipwrecks: 13 December 1844
Ship	State	Description
Agnes	(United Kingdom of Great Britain and Ireland) Guernsey	The schooner was wrecked at "Saint-Germain", France with the loss of all hands. She was on a voyage from South Shields, County Durham to Saint-Malo, Ille-et-Vilaine, France.
Brutus	United Kingdom	The barque ran aground on the Spit Bank, in the Irish Sea off the coast of County Cork. She was refloated on 8 January 1845.
Duchess of York	United Kingdom	The ship was driven ashore at Dingle, County Kerry.
Eliza	United Kingdom	The ship was driven ashore at Youghal, County Cork. She was on a voyage from Newport, Monmouthshire to Youghal.
Eliza	United Kingdom	The ship was driven ashore and wrecked in Ardmore Bay with the loss of all hands.
Ellen	United Kingdom	The ship capsized at Youghal, County Cork.
Ellen and Ann	United Kingdom	The schooner capsized off Ardmore, County Waterford. She was driven ashore and wrecked at Ardmore Head with the loss of all six of her crew.
Erin	(United Kingdom of Great Britain and Ireland) Guernsey	The schooner was wrecked at Saint-Germain, France with the loss of all hands. She was on a voyage from Guernsey to Saint-Malo, Ille-et-Vilaine, France.
Gipsy	United Kingdom	The smack ran aground at Isleornsay, Isle of Skye, Outer Hebrides.
Heywood	United Kingdom	The barque ran aground on the Spit Bank. She was refloated on 24 December.
Joseph and Fanny	United Kingdom	The ship was driven ashore at Clay Castle, County Cork. She was on a voyage from Cork to Newport, Monmouthshire.
Mariner	(United Kingdom of Great Britain and Ireland) British North America	The ship, which had been damaged by ice on 12 December, was beached on the south coast of Prince Edward Island. She was on a voyage from Charlottetown to Liverpool, Lancashire, United Kingdom. She was consequently condemned.
Massasvit	United States	The ship was driven ashore and wrecked at Point Alderton, New York with the loss of two of her crew. She was on a voyage from Calcutta, India to New York City.
Peel's One	United Kingdom	The ship was driven ashore at Dingle.
Valentine	United Kingdom	The ship was driven ashore and wrecked at Youghal. Her crew were rescued. She was on a voyage from Seville, Spain to Dublin.
Victory	United Kingdom	The ship was driven ashore 37 nautical miles (69 km) north of Wexford with the loss of a crew member. She was on a voyage from Portmadoc, Caernarfonshire to Chepstow, Monmouthshire.
William and Nancy	United Kingdom	The ship was driven ashore at the Mumbles, Glamorgan. She was on a voyage from Barnstaple, Devon to Porthcawl, Glamorgan. She was refloated on 9 January 1845 and resumed her voyage.

== 14 December ==
List of shipwrecks: 14 December 1844
Ship	State	Description
Caroline	Hamburg	The barque was driven ashore at Cuxhaven. She was on a voyage from Rio de Janeiro, Brazil to Hamburg.
George	United Kingdom	The schooner was driven ashore at Carmarthen. She was later refloated and taken in to Saundersfoot, Pembrokeshire for repairs.
Gomer	United Kingdom	The ship was driven ashore at Carrigaholt, County Clare. She was on a voyage from Limerick to Liverpool, Lancashire.
Jane Ann	United Kingdom	The ship was wrecked on the North Gar, off the mouth of the River Tees.
Lady Scott	United Kingdom	The ship was wrecked on Castle Island, Bermuda. Her crew were rescued. She was on a voyage from St. Jago de Cuba, Cuba to Swansea, Glamorgan.
Liberal	Portugal	The brig was wrecked at Lisbon with the loss of nine or ten of the thirteen or fourteen people on board. She was on a voyage from Rio de Janeiro, Brazil to Lisbon.
Minerva	United Kingdom	The ship struck a rock and foundered off St Eval Head, Cornwall. Her crew were rescued.
Paragon	United Kingdom	The brig sprang a leak and was beached at Bamburgh Castle, Northumberland, where she became a wreck. Two of her crew were drowned.
Paris	France	The steamship was driven ashore at "Altenbruch". She was on a voyage from Glückstadt, Duchy of Schleswig to Le Havre, Seine-Inférieure. She was refloated on 15 December and sailed to Heligoland.
Señora del Carmen	Spain	The ship was driven ashore at Lisbon. Her crew were rescued.
Vanguard	United Kingdom	The paddle steamer ran aground off Cork. Her passengers were taken off. She was refloated on 24 December.

== 15 December ==
List of shipwrecks: 15 December 1844
Ship	State	Description
Concordia	Danzig	The ship was wrecked on the Dem Bank, off the mouth of the Gironde.
Demerara Packet	United Kingdom	The ship caught fire in the Irish Sea and was beached near Dublin, where she was wrecked. Her crew were rescued. She was on a voyage from Liverpool to Demerara, British Guiana.
Dorchester	United States	The ship was abandoned in the Atlantic Ocean. All 46 people on board were rescued by Rochester (United States). Dorchester was on a voyage from Boston, Massachusetts, to Liverpool.
Helena	Russia	The ship was driven ashore and wrecked at Cette, Hérault, France. Her crew were rescued.
Iduna	Norway	The ship was driven ashore east of Cette. Her crew were rescued.
Nautilus	Stettin	The ship ran aground on the Dem Bank.
Templer	United Kingdom	The ship was driven ashore and wrecked near Conil de la Frontera, Spain. Her crew were rescued. She was on a voyage from Liverpool to Livorno, Grand Duchy of Tuscany.
Triton	United Kingdom	The ship was driven ashore and wrecked near "Crimbritshaven", Sweden. She was on a voyage from Liebau, Prussia to King's Lynn, Norfolk.

== 16 December ==
List of shipwrecks: 16 December 1844
Ship	State	Description
Angelina	Netherlands	The galiot was wrecked at Cette, Hérault, France.
Gazelle	United Kingdom	The ship was driven ashore in the Belfast Lough at Groomsport, County Down and was abandoned by her crew. She was on a voyage from Ayr to Belfast, County Antrim. She was subsequently refloated.
Harmonie	Sweden	The ship was driven ashore near Royan, Charente-Maritime, France.
Josephine	France	The ship was wrecked at Cette.
Nimrod	United Kingdom	The ship was driven ashore and wrecked at Aberdeen. Her crew were rescued. She was on a voyage from Aberdeen to South Shields, County Durham.
Star	United Kingdom	The ship was in collision with another vessel and foundered off Sicily. Her crew were rescued. She was on a voyage from Messina, Sicily to London.

== 17 December ==
List of shipwrecks: 17 December 1844
Ship	State	Description
Eleonore Pauline	Denmark	The ship foundered 100 nautical miles (190 km) off the coast of Norway. Her crew were rescued by Oberon (United Kingdom). Eleonore Pauline was on a voyage from Kalundborg to Hull, Yorkshire, United Kingdom.
Sylph	United Kingdom	The paddle steamer was run down and sunk in the River Thames at Greenwich, Kent by the steamship Orwell (United Kingdom) with the loss of seventeen lives. Sylph was on a voyage from London Bridge to Woolwich, Kent.

== 18 December ==
List of shipwrecks: 18 December 1844
Ship	State	Description
Fanny	(United Kingdom of Great Britain and Ireland) Van Diemen's Land	The ship was wrecked east of George Town.
Lord Eldon	United Kingdom	The barque was wrecked at Madras, India.

== 19 December ==
List of shipwrecks: 19 December 1844
Ship	State	Description
Amy	United Kingdom	The ship ran aground and was severely damaged off New Grimsby, Isles of Scilly. She was on a voyage from Liverpool, Lancashire to Ipswich, Suffolk. She was refloated and taken in to New Grimsby.
Bolina	(United Kingdom of Great Britain and Ireland) Jersey	The ship was driven ashore near Saint-Brieuc, Côtes-du-Nord, France. She was on a voyage from Saint-Brieuc to London. She was consequently condemned.
Clarinda	United Kingdom	The ship was partly abandoned in the Atlantic Ocean. Seven of her twelve crew were taken off by Augustine Heard (United States). Clarinda was on a voyage from Quebec City, Province of Canada, British North America to New Ross, County Wexford.
Clarita	Hamburg	The ship was wrecked on Scharhörn. Her crew were rescued. She was on a voyage from Málaga, Spain to Hamburgh.
Express	United Kingdom	The ship foundered in the North Sea off Great Yarmouth, Norfolk. Her crew were rescued. She was on a voyage from Stettin to London.
Johann Carl	Bremen	The ship ran aground near Wremen. She was refloated.
Nicholai Savin	Russia	The ship was driven ashore near Holyhead, Anglesey, United Kingdom. She was on a voyage from Saint Petersburg to Liverpool, Lancashire, United Kingdom. She capsized on 21 December. She was refloated on 23 December and taken in to Holyhead.
Yorkshireman	United Kingdom	The paddle steamer ran aground on the Holme Sand. She was on a voyage from Hull, Yorkshire to Great Yarmouth, Norfolk.

== 20 December ==
List of shipwrecks: December 1844
Ship	State	Description
Emma	United Kingdom	The ship was driven ashore at Yarmouth, Isle of Wight. She wason a voyage from Swansea, Glamorgan to London. She was refloated the next day.
Jaeger	United Kingdom	The ship struck the Blackwater Rock, in the Irish Sea. She subsequently came ashore 8 nautical miles (15 km) north of Wexford and was wrecked. She was on a voyage from Liverpool, Lancashire to Calcutta, India.
Polly	United Kingdom	The ship was driven ashore near Den Helder, North Holland, Netherlands. She was on a voyage from Amsterdam, North Holland to Newcastle upon Tyne, Northumberland. She was refloated and taken in to the North Holland Canal.
Recovery	United Kingdom	The barque ran aground on the Half-ebb Rock, off Harwich, Essex. She was on a voyage from London to Newcastle upon Tyne, Northumberland.
Rhoda	United Kingdom	The ship ran aground at Liverpool, Lancashire. She was on a voyage from Messina, Sicily to Liverpool. She was refloated.
Waterlilly	United Kingdom	The ship ran aground on the Hollywood Bank, in the Irish Sea off the coast of County Antrim. She was on a voyage from Smyrna, Ottoman Empire to Belfast, County Antrim.
William Henry	United States	The ship was driven ashore at Yarmouth, Nova Scotia, British North America. She was on a voyage from Baltimore, Maryland to Halifax, Nova Scotia. She was refloated on 8 January 1845 and taken in to Yarmouth.

== 21 December ==
List of shipwrecks: 21 December 1844
Ship	State	Description
Charita	Spain	The schooner was driven ashore and capsized on Scharhörn. Her eleven crew survived. She was on a voyage from Málaga to Hamburg.
Craigie	United Kingdom	The brig was driven ashore and damaged at North Somercotes, Lincolnshire. Her crew were rescued by a lifeboat. She was on a voyage from Riga, Russia to Bridgwater, Somerset. She was refloated on 30 December and taken in to Grimsby, Lincolnshire.
Elvira	Stettin	The brig was driven ashore west of Barcelona, Spain Her crew were rescued. She was on a voyage from Stettin to Barcelona.
Esk	United Kingdom	The ship foundered in the North Sea off the mouth of the River Tyne. Her crew were rescued.
Ouse	United Kingdom	The ship ran aground at Wells-next-the-Sea, Norfolk and was damaged.
Palanquin	United Kingdom	The ship was wrecked on Nelsons Island, in the Chagos Archipelago. Her crew survived. She was on a voyage from Liverpool, Lancashire to Bombay, India.

== 22 December ==
List of shipwrecks: 22 December 1845
Ship	State	Description
Jeune Emile	France	The ship was wrecked 30 leagues (90 nautical miles (170 km) from Pernambuco, Brazil, Her crew were rescued. She was on a voyage from Lima, Peru to Le Havre, Seine-Inférieure.

== 23 December ==
List of shipwrecks: 23 December 1844
Ship	State	Description
Acrogin	United States	The ship ran aground at New Orleans, Louisiana.
Benares	India	The ship ran aground on a reef off "Polo Beberan", Sumatra, Spanish East Indies. She was refloated and taken in to Barus, where she sank.
Diligent	United Kingdom	The ship was damaged by fire.
Evelyn	United Kingdom	The ship ran aground at Maryport, Cumberland. She was on a voyage from Liverpool, Lancashire to Maryport.
Hope	United Kingdom	The sloop was wrecked on the Elbow End Bank, off the mouth of the River Tay. Her crew were rescued. She was on a voyage from Dundee, Forfarshire to the River Eden.
Lady Grace	United Kingdom	The schooner ran aground on a rock 1 league (3 nautical miles (5.6 km) off the coast of Connemara, Ireland. Her five crew were rescued. She was on a voyage from Glasgow, Renfrewshire to Kilrush, County Clare. Lady Grace floated off and sank.
Martha	United States	The ship ran aground at New Orleans.
Ocean	United Kingdom	The ship ran aground on the Tegeler Sand, in the North Sea.

== 24 December ==
List of shipwrecks: 24 December 1844
Ship	State	Description
Alpha	United Kingdom	The ship was wrecked at Finsbay, Isle of Harris. Her crew were rescued. She was on a voyage from Memel, Prussia to Killarney, County Kerry.
Brilliant	United Kingdom	The ship ran aground off Worthing, Sussex. She was on a voyage from British Honduras to London. She was refloated.
Highland Lass	United Kingdom	The ship was wrecked on the North Carr Rock, off the coast of Berwickshire. Her crew were rescued.

== 25 December ==
List of shipwrecks: 25 December 1844
Ship	State	Description
Benjamin Eller Black	(United Kingdom of Great Britain and Ireland) British North America	The ship was wrecked in the Burgee Islands. Her crew were rescued. She was on a voyage from Sydney, Nova Scotia to Saint John's, Newfoundland.
Cherub	United Kingdom	The ship ran aground at Sunderland, County Durham. She was refloated and put back to Sunderland in a leaky condition.
James Bailey	United Kingdom	The barque ran aground on the Gunfleet Sand, in the North Sea off the coast of Essex. She was on a voyage from London to Hartlepool, County Durham. James Bailey was refloated with the assistance of four smacks and taken in to Wivenhoe, Essex.
Joseph	United Kingdom	The ship was wrecked at Pendennis Castle, Caernarfonshire with the loss of all hands.
HMS Pelorus	Royal Navy	The Cruizer-class brig-sloop struck a shoal in the South China Sea off Borneo and was wrecked. All on board survived.
Rose	(United Kingdom of Great Britain and Ireland) British North America	The ship was abandoned in the Atlantic Ocean with the loss of a crew member. Survivors were rescued by Mariner (United States). Rose was on a voyage from Grenada to Yarmouth, Nova Scotia.

== 26 December ==
List of shipwrecks: 26 December 1845
Ship	State	Description
Basque	United Kingdom	The ship was driven ashore and damaged at "Cormen".
Curlew	United Kingdom	The ship was wrecked on the Jardines, off the coast of Cuba. Her crew were rescued. She was on a voyage from Liverpool, Lancashire to Cienfuegos, Cuba.
Favourite	United Kingdom	The ship was severely damaged by fire at Cork.
Jenny	United Kingdom	The ship was driven ashore and damaged at "Cormen".

== 27 December ==
List of shipwrecks: 27 December 1845
Ship	State	Description
Affiance	United Kingdom	The brig ran aground at Flamborough Head, Yorkshire. She was on a voyage from London to South Shields, County Durham. She was refloated and resumed her voyage.
Fair Maid of Perth	United Kingdom	The schooner was driven ashore at Filey, Yorkshire. She was refloated
Palemon	United Kingdom	The ship was driven ashore at Filey Bridge, Yorkshire. She was refloated and beached at Filey.
Thetis	United Kingdom	The ship was driven ashore near Ulrome, Yorkshire. She was on a voyage from Marseille, Bouches-du-Rhône, France to South Shields, County Durham. She was refloated and resumed her voyage.
Twee Cornelissen	Netherlands	The East Indiaman was driven ashore and wrecked at Pevensey Bay, Sussex, United Kingdom with the loss of one of the 31 people on board. Eighteen people reached shore in the ship's longboat; the rest were rescued by the Eastbourne Lifeboat. Twee Cornelissen was on a voyage from Batavia, Netherlands East Indies to Amsterdam, North Holland.

== 28 December ==
List of shipwrecks: 28 December 1844
Ship	State	Description
Alexander	United Kingdom	The ship was run into east of São Miguel Island, Azores by Excel (United Kingdom). She was abandoned the next day and sank.
Reaper	United Kingdom	The ship was driven ashore 1 nautical mile (1.9 km) north of Filey Bridge, Yorkshire.
Unity	United Kingdom	The ship departed from London for Lyme, Dorset. No further trace, presumed foundered off Ramsgate, Kent with the loss of all hands.

== 29 December ==
List of shipwrecks: 29 December 1844
Ship	State	Description
Betsey	United Kingdom	The ketch was wrecked on the Isle of Whithorn, Wigtownshire. Her crew were rescued. She was on a voyage from Maryport, Cumberland to Newry, County Antrim.
Charles	(United Kingdom of Great Britain and Ireland) Jersey	The ship was driven in to the barque Lewis (United States) at Gibraltar. She was consequently condemned.
Harmony	United Kingdom	The collier, a brig, was driven ashore, capsized and wrecked at Flamborough Head, Yorkshire. Her crew were rescued. She was on a voyage from Sunderland, County Durham to London.
Pennsylvania	United States	The ship was wrecked near "Bahia and Sonde". She was on a voyage from New Orleans, Louisiana to Liverpool, Lancashire, United Kingdom.
Providentia	Lübeck	The ship ran aground off "Steons", Denmark. She was refloated and put in to Copenhagen in a leaky condition.

== 30 December ==
List of shipwrecks: 30 December 1844
Ship	State	Description
Ceres	United Kingdom	The ship ran aground on the Haisborough Sands, in the North Sea off the coast of Norfolk and was abandoned by her crew. She was on a voyage from North Shields, County Durham to London.
Friends	United Kingdom	The brigantine was wrecked at the Corsewall Lighthouse, Wigtownshire. Her crew were rescued.
Ida	Stettin	The ship was beset by ice off Rügen, Prussia and was abandoned by her crew.
Isabella	United Kingdom	The ship collided with Rover (United Kingdom) and sank at North Shields, County Durham. Her crew were rescued by a coble. She was on a voyage from Berwick upon Tweed, Northumberland to North Shields. She was refloated on 19 May 1845 and beached.
Liveni	United Kingdom	The ship ran aground on the Cockle Sand, in the North Sea off the coast of Norfolk. She was on a voyage from South Shields, County Durham to London. She was refloated and put in to Great Yarmouth, Norfolk.
Stolpemünde	Prussia	The ship was beset by ice off Rügen and was abandoned by her crew.

== 31 December ==
List of shipwrecks: 31 December 1844
Ship	State	Description
Arab	United Kingdom	The ship departed from Cork for Saint John's, Newfoundland, British North America. No further trace, presumed foundered with the loss of all hands.
Beata	Sweden	The ship was wrecked on Skagen, Denmark. Her crew were rescued. She was on a voyage from Hartlepool, County Durham, United Kingdom to Landskrona.
Ceres	Prussia	The ship was wrecked on Skagen. Her crew were rescued. She was on a voyage from Plymouth, Devon, United Kingdom to Memel.
Christiane Cecilia	Denmark	The ship was driven ashore on Skagen. Her crew were rescued. She was on a voyage from Leith, Lothian, United Kingdom to Copenhagen. She was refloated in January 1845 and taken in to Fredrikshavn.
Herwig	Stettin	The ship was wrecked on Skagen. Her crew were rescued. She was on a voyage from Newcastle upon Tyne, Northumberland, United Kingdom to Copenhagen.
Lisette	Rostock	The ship was wrecked on Skagen. Her crew were rescued. She was on a voyage from Rostock to Newcastle upon Tyne.
Nordstern	Denmark	The ship was wrecked on Skagen. Her crew were rescued. She was on a voyage from Newcastle upon Tyne to Copenhagen.
Telemachus	United Kingdom	The schooner ran aground on the Whitby Rock. She was refloated and taken in to Whitby, Yorkshire.

== Unknown date ==
List of shipwrecks: Unknown date in December 1844
Ship	State	Description
Alexandrina	United Kingdom	The schooner was lost near Sozopol, Ottoman Empire between 7 and 11 December with the loss of all but her captain.
Allessandra	Austrian Empire	The barque was lost at "Carbouvnon", Ottoman Empire between 7 and 11 December.
Bella	United States	The steamship exploded and sank in the Mississippi River with the loss of 31 lives.
Caribbean	Bremen	The brig was abandoned in the Atlantic Ocean before 14 December.
Comet	Russia	The ship was wrecked at Iniadai, Greece between 7 and 11 December.
Der Jonge Gustaf	Flag unknown	The ship foundered in the North Sea off the coast of Aberdeenshire, United Kingdom.
Dragoe	Austrian Empire	The barque was wrecked near "Achails", Ottoman Empire between 7 and 11 December.
Eleanora	United Kingdom	The ship was driven ashore near Hartlepool, County Durham. She was refloated on 9 December but was driven higher up the beach.
Elizabeth	(United Kingdom of Great Britain and Ireland) New South Wales	The schooner was wrecked in Portland Bay.
Elizabeth Bentley	United Kingdom	The ship was abandoned in the Atlantic Ocean. Her crew were rescued by Fanny (United Kingdom).
"Fawn"	United States	The boat was lost on Rocky Neck.
Hero	Norway	The ship was lost off the mouth of the River Eden.
Hydros	United Kingdom	The ship was wrecked on the coast of New Guinea before 14 December.
Jolet	France	The brig was struck by lightning and set on fire at Mahón, Menorca, Spain.
Manney	United Kingdom	The ship collided with an iceberg before 8 December whilst on a voyage from Liverpool to Arica, Peru. She put in to the Falkland Islands, where she was condemned.
Moira	United Kingdom	The ship foundered in late 1843 or in 1844 during a voyage to India.
Mount Pleasant	United States	The steamship foundered with the loss of all ten crew.
Normandie	United Kingdom	The ship foundered in the Atlantic Ocean between 10 and 13 December with the loss of all hands. She was on a voyage from New York, United States to Hull, Yorkshire.
North America	United Kingdom	The ship was wrecked at Bunbury, Swan River Colony before 21 December.
Perception	United Kingdom	The ship ran aground at North Shields, County Durham in late December. She was later refloated.
Pleiades	(United Kingdom of Great Britain and Ireland) British North America	The ship ran aground on a reef in Deep Bay, Saint Kitts before 30 December. She was refloated but was consequently condemned.
Polly	United Kingdom	The ship was driven ashore on the west coast of Texel, North Holland, Netherlands before 8 December. She was on a voyage from Amsterdam, North Holland to Newcastle upon Tyne, Northumberland.
R. A. Parke	United Kingdom	The ship was driven ashore in Blacksod Bay. She was on a voyage from Quebec City to Belfast. She was later refloated and taken in to Belfast, where she arrived on 1 January 1845.
Robert Burns	United Kingdom	The ship was beached in Lough Swilly before 6 December. she was on a voyage from Saint Petersburg, Russia to Liverpool, Lancashire. She was refloated on 13 December.
Sally Ann	(United Kingdom of Great Britain and Ireland) British North America	The schooner was wrecked in Portland Bay.
Theophiles	France	The ship was wrecked at Licata, Sicily. Her crew were rescued. She was on a voyage from Licata to Marseille, Bouches-du-Rhône.
Valentine	United Kingdom	The ship was driven ashore at Youghal, County Cork before 16 December. She was on a voyage from Seville, Spain to Dublin.
Vice	Austrian Empire	The brig was lost at "Domons Deich", Ottoman Empire between 7 and 11 December with the loss of three of her crew.
