= Joseph Ellison =

Royal Navy officer

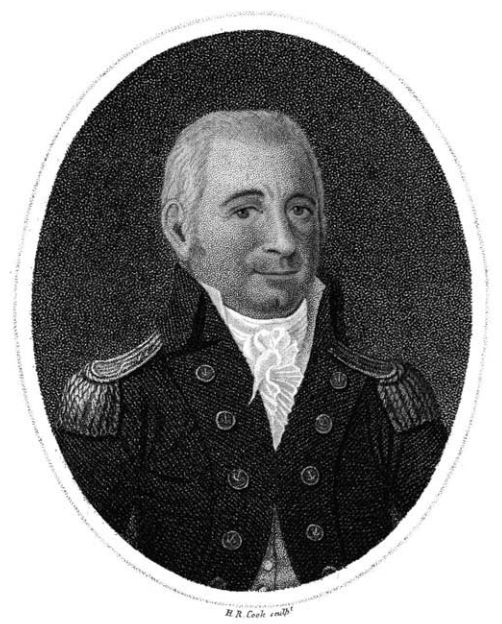
- Captain Joseph Ellison
- Born: 1753; Newcastle upon Tyne
- Died: 1 October 1816, aged 63; Royal Naval Hospital, Greenwich
- Relatives: Richard Ellison; Cuthbert Ellison
- Military career
- Branch: Royal Navy
- Rank: Captain
- Nickname: Jock
- Commands: HMS Ostrich; HMS Panther; HMS Ariadne; HMS Druid; HMS Standard; HMS Marlborough
- Conflicts: Falklands Crisis; American Revolutionary War; Battle of Bunker Hill; Siege of Pondicherry; French Revolutionary Wars; Quiberon Bay Expedition; Napoleonic Wars
- Other work: Impress service officer Lieutenant-Governor of the Royal Naval Hospital, Stonehouse; Captain of Greenwich Naval Hospital

Captain Joseph Ellison (1753 – 1 October 1816) was a Royal Navy officer. Having joined the service at the age of nine, he served during the Falklands Crisis in 1770 and went on to participate in the Battle of Bunker Hill and Siege of Pondicherry during the American Revolutionary War, during which he was promoted to lieutenant. On 4 July 1780 Ellison was serving on board HMS Prudente when they engaged, with another British frigate, two French frigates off Cape Ortegal. Ellison was badly wounded in the back during the battle and had an arm destroyed by a cannon ball that was amputated after the British had attained their victory. Having recuperated from his injuries Ellison was appointed to the impress service where he performed so well that he was promoted to commander in 1782 and post-captain in 1783. He took command of HMS Ariadne in April of that year and served in her off Ireland investigating fisheries, but in September he temporarily retired from the navy when his wounds began to become more problematic.

By 1785 Ellison's condition had improved once again and he was given command of HMS Druid, which he would command almost unbrokenly into the French Revolutionary Wars. In June 1794 he played a prominent part in an action against a much superior French squadron while under the command of Sir James Saumarez in the Channel Islands, where the smaller British force successfully escaped the French attack. In June 1795 he was given command of HMS Standard in which he participated in the Quiberon Bay Expedition where he unsuccessfully attempted to force the island of Belle Île to surrender. After this Ellison left Standard to again rest and recover his health, and was given HMS Marlborough in August 1797.

Marlborough had removed her previous captain during the Spithead mutiny and Ellison was brought in as a captain more favourable to seamen. Despite this, while sailing to join the Mediterranean Fleet on 7 May 1798 the crew attempted to mutiny, but Ellison was warned and was able to get on deck before the attack unfolded. He left Marlborough in November because of another deterioration in his health, and re-joined the impress service until 1801. In 1803 he was appointed a captain of Greenwich Naval Hospital, where he served until his death in 1816.

== Early life ==
Joseph Ellison was born in Newcastle-upon-Tyne in 1753. His family were of a respectable background, and he was distantly related to the member of parliament Richard Ellison and General Cuthbert Ellison. His father, who was also named Joseph Ellison, died when Ellison was six months old. He was then adopted by a childless aunt who lived in Portsmouth. He joined the Royal Navy at the age of nine.

== Naval career ==
Ellison went to sea initially with Admiral Sir Edward Hawke in the 100-gun ship of the line HMS Royal George. That ship was paid off on 18 December 1762 and then in 1763 he transferred to the 60-gun fourth rate HMS Rippon. He soon after moved to the 74-gun ship of the line HMS Arrogant, the guardship at Portsmouth, in which he served until 1767. At this point he transferred ships again, joining the 32-gun frigate HMS Glory which was in ordinary at Chatham, where he served until he left for the 20-gun frigate HMS Aldborough in 1769. Ellison's quick progression through ships continued into 1770, with him then joining the 70-gun ship of the line HMS Boyne. Boyne was freshly commissioned for the Falklands Crisis and she sailed to Jamaica on 3 June 1771. She returned home in 1772 and became guardship at Plymouth in April 1773, at which point Ellison moved to the 90-gun ship of the line HMS Ocean, another Plymouth guardship. Soon after this he moved into the 70-gun ship of the line HMS Somerset and was then briefly seconded from her to the 74-gun ship of the line HMS Albion. (Note: Clarke and McArthur claim that Ellison spent around three years on Ocean before moving to Somerset, but also state that Ellison was on board Somerset when she travelled to North America in 1774, making the chronology of Ellison's exact career path in the 1770s uncertain.)

=== American Revolutionary War ===
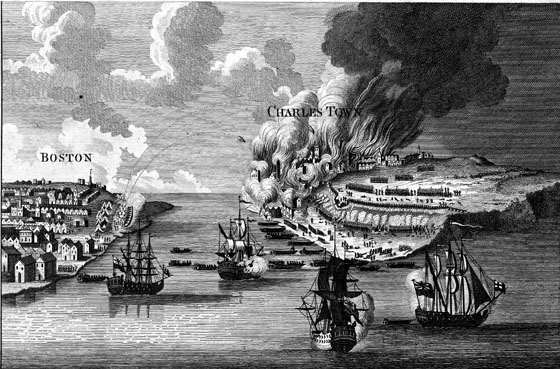
A view of the Battle of Bunker Hill where Ellison commanded Somerset's barge

After a few months Ellison returned to Somerset, and the ship was sent to Boston on 24 October 1774 to serve on the North America Station. The American Revolutionary War having by now begun, Captain Edward Le Cras of Somerset gave Ellison command over three flat-bottomed boats to assist in obstructing groups of American rebels from connecting with one another. This duty required almost constant alertness by the men involved and they were frequently harassed by rebel forces. Ellison re-joined Somerset only when the craft being used were discharged as being unsuitable for further service. Soon after this Major-General Sir William Howe arrived at Boston to serve as Commander-in-Chief of British land forces in North America. Having heard that American forces were attacking Charleston, Howe was conveyed there by Ellison in Somerset's barge. Upon arriving there on 16 June 1775 Ellison assisted Howe's army in burning the town, and he then volunteered to continue on land with the army. It was decided however that he should stay with the barge in case the army needed to retreat. On the following day Howe fought the Battle of Bunker Hill and then re-embarked in Ellison's barge to sail back to Boston.

Ellison's successes in these endeavours led Howe to offer him a commission in the British Army after they reached Boston, but he declined it. Ellison left North America in March 1776 when Somerset sailed home. When he reached England, he removed into Rippon, now the flagship of Commodore Sir Edward Vernon. They sailed to join the East Indies Station on 24 November and soon after Rippon's arrival in 1778 the Anglo-French War began. Having been promoted to lieutenant on 29 July, he fought in a skirmish between the British and French fleets on 10 August off Pondicherry. After this Vernon sent him to serve in the 14-gun sloop HMS Cormorant, in which he participated in the successful Siege of Pondicherry in October.

After the siege Cormorant was sent to serve in the Red Sea, sailing for Suez. Once the ship arrived there a portion of the crew deserted to live with the local population. Ellison was sent ashore to recover the men, but was then captured by some Turks and set before a military tribunal. Cormorant's captain, Commander William Owen, threatened to sail in to the coast and bombard the town Ellison was being held in unless he was given up. The threat was successful and Ellison was released soon after. Cormorant subsequently sailed to Madras, where Owen died in an accident on 24 October. Ellison took temporary command of the ship and sailed her to Trincomalee where Commander Charles Pole took over. They then sailed home to England carrying dispatches from the army and the navy, arriving in March 1779 after a journey of four months and thirteen days. Pole was appointed to another ship upon his return; Ellison was left in temporary command again, and he sailed Cormorant to Sheerness.

=== Wounding ===
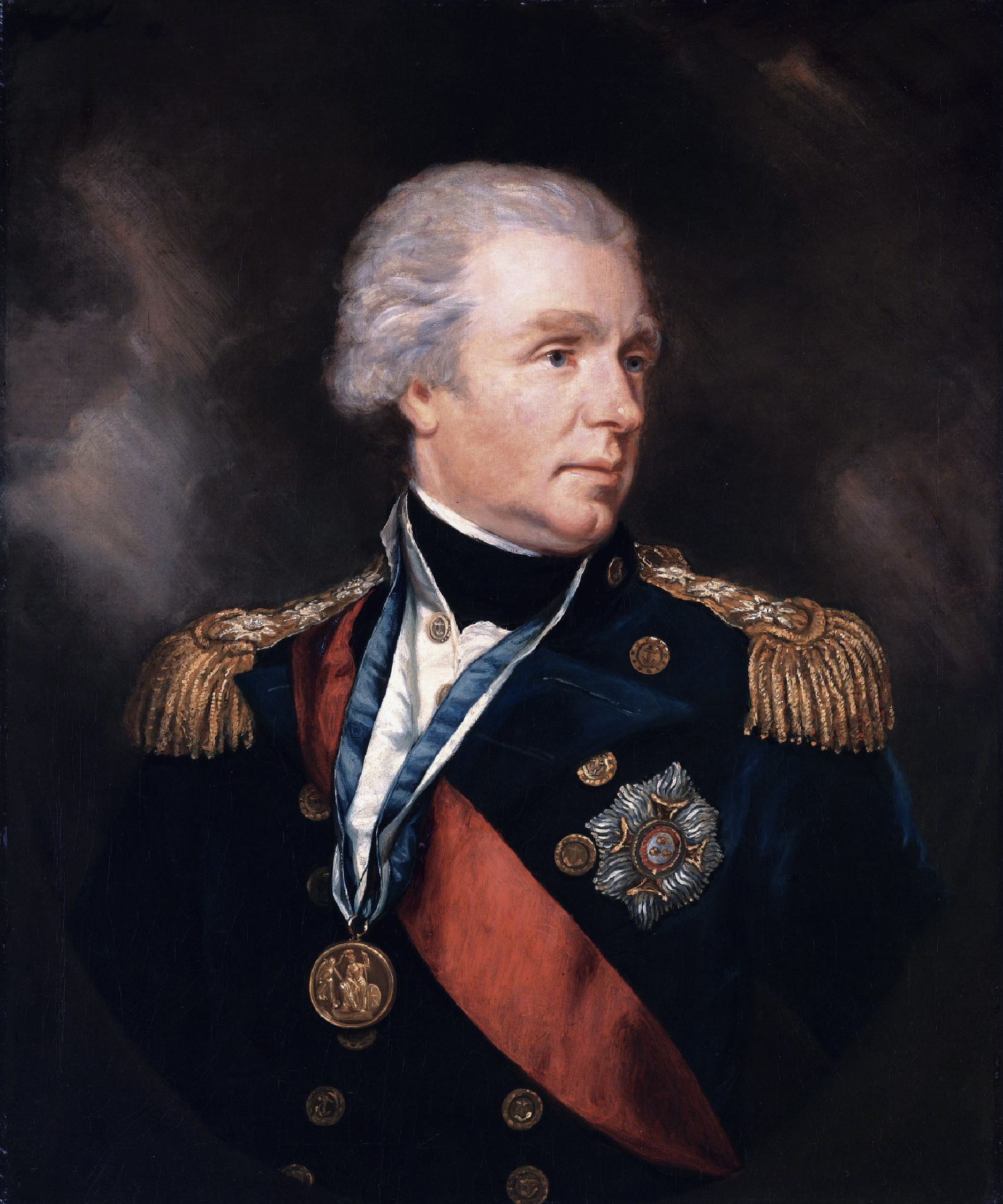
William Waldegrave, captain of Prudente at the time of Ellison's wounding

By the summer of 1779 he was serving on board the 90-gun ship of the line HMS Queen, the flagship of Vice-Admiral Sir Robert Harland, in the English Channel. He left Queen towards the end of the year and was appointed to the 36-gun frigate HMS Prudente, which was at the time preparing to sail at Deptford. She was commissioned in March 1780 and Prudente initially sailed to the Baltic Sea and then returned to England to join the Channel Fleet. On the night of 4 July, while patrolling with the 32-gun frigate HMS Licorne, they engaged two French frigates in a protracted fight off Cape Ortegal. During the action Ellison had his right arm shattered by an 18-pounder ball; one of the French frigates, the 32-gun Capricieuse, was captured by the British and it was her surgeon that after the battle amputated Ellison's arm. He also received several dangerous wounds to his back during the five hour engagement. Prudente's captain, Captain William Waldegrave, described Ellison's "great intrepidity" during the action and requested that despite his injuries, he continue to be employed. Prudente returned to England on 19 July and Ellison was sent ashore under the care of Waldegrave and the now Sir Charles Pole who had come to assist Ellison in his plight. He was put up in Gosport, where he received a number of visits from senior officers, including Captain Lord Hugh Seymour who became a lifelong friend of his.

=== Impress service ===
Upon recovering from his wound Ellison petitioned the First Lord of the Admiralty, Lord Sandwich, for another appointment at sea, but his amputation meant that opportunities were slim for him, and instead he was given command of a section of the impress service. Out of respect for Ellison's previous services Sandwich allowed him to choose what position he wished to have, and he created a new impress post at Gosport for him. Ellison had great success in this position, including on one occasion with fourteen men boarding an East Indiaman and detaining forty-five deserters. Sandwich's successor as First Lord, Admiral Lord Keppel, was told of his deeds by Admiral Sir Thomas Pye and Vice-Admiral John Evans and had him promoted to commander on 6 June 1782. Ellison was given nominal command of the 14-gun sloop HMS Ostrich at this point but stayed at Gosport commanding his section of the impress service. Ostrich was paid off in August.

Ellison continued to serve in the impress, and was again rewarded for his service when on 21 January 1783 he was promoted to post-captain. As with Ostrich, for the purpose of his promotion he was nominally in command of the 60-gun fourth rate HMS Panther but this ship was in ordinary and Ellison continued to ply his trade in the impress service. As war with France and Spain began to wind down, Ellison left his position with Panther in the impress and was given command of the 20-gun post ship HMS Ariadne in April. He was sent to the north of Ireland with the 16-gun sloop HMS Seaflower under his orders, where he went about investigating possible sites for fisheries. This task was unsuccessful and he returned to England in September. He briefly retired from the Royal Navy at this point because his wounds continued to break open and bleed badly and he felt himself incapable of continuing to competently command Ariadne.

=== Druid ===
In February 1785 his wounds had healed to the extent that he began to petition for command of a frigate, and he received that of the 32-gun HMS Druid. Ellison commanded Druid through the years of peace after the Revolutionary War. In May he was sent with Commodore George Vandeput to convey Prince Edward to Stadt. After returning from this mission he was given a squadron consisting of the 18-gun sloop HMS Pylades, 16-gun sloop HMS Fairy, 10-gun cutter HMS Sprightly, and 14-gun cutter HMS Barracouta. The squadron was stationed off the Lizard on anti-smuggling duties, where they captured a number of craft. After this Ellison and Druid joined a frigate squadron that included the 28-gun HMS Pegasus, 28-gun HMS Rose, and 38-gun HMS Hebe. For a period of time when Hebe was absent with the senior officer, Ellison commanded the squadron. In February 1788 Druid was paid off but he successfully petitioned to be assigned again to that ship, and he re-joined her in October 1790. He joined the fleets that assembled during the Spanish Armament in October 1790 and the Russian Armament in October 1791. After this he was sent with secret orders to the Leeward Islands Station on 6 April 1792. He returned from the West Indies in September in company with the 50-gun fourth-rate HMS Medusa, and while doing so visited Portland Roads to pay his respects to King George III, who was at the time visiting there. He spoke to the king who was greatly put about upon hearing that Ellison had commanded Druid for over seven years, but Ellison was resolute in wanting to stay in his ship and joked with the king that he wished he would give Druid as a present to him.

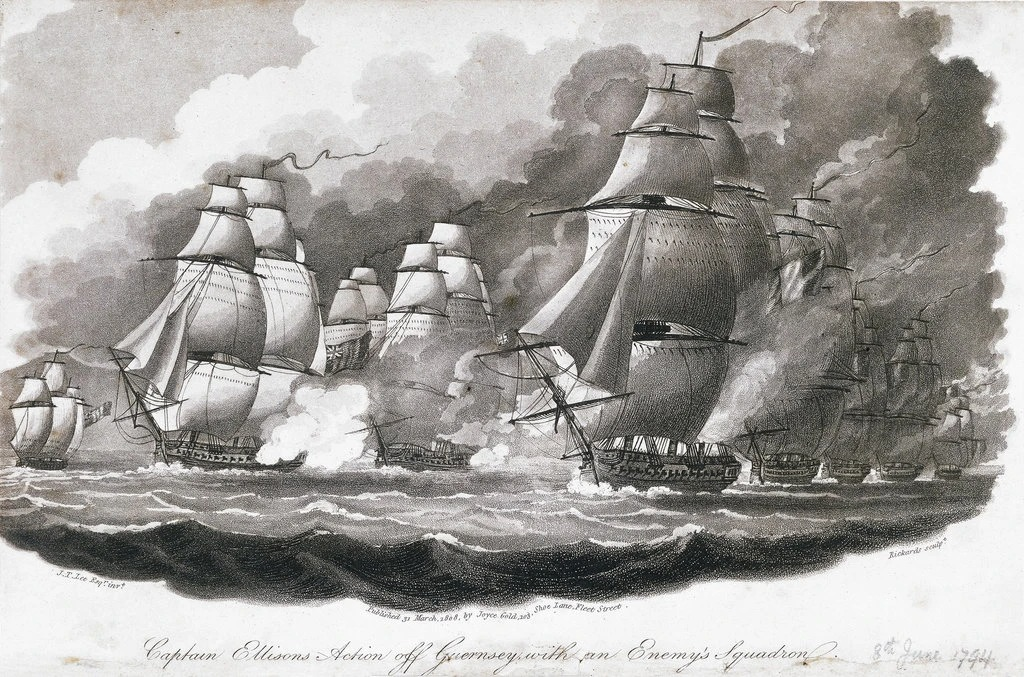
Druid and Crescent engage the French on 8 June 1794

When the French Revolutionary Wars began in February 1793 Ellison remained in command of Druid and he was immediately sent on several cruises off the French coast. On the second of these he took the 28-gun frigate HMS Circe under his command and together they captured two merchant ships and the 14-gun privateer l'Esperance in June. By June 1794 he was serving on the Downs Station in a squadron of three frigates commanded by Commodore Sir James Saumarez in the Channel Islands. On 8 June the squadron narrowly escaped from a vastly superior French force that included the two 50-gun razees Scévola and Brutus by using Saumarez's local knowledge of the waters. Ellison was specially singled out by Saumarez for praise after the action, he having alongside the 36-gun frigate HMS Crescent fought off the main attack of the French force as the British made their escape. Ellison's command of Druid finally ended in June 1795 when he was given command of the 64-gun ship of the line HMS Standard. As a sign of official approval of his services Ellison was allowed to bring with him to Standard all his officers and fifty men from Druid.

=== Quiberon Bay expedition ===
Ellison joined Commodore Sir John Borlase Warren's squadron for the Quiberon Bay Expedition in which a French Royalist army was to be landed by the Royal Navy. The squadron sailed from Yarmouth Roads in the middle of June from where they joined with the fleet of Admiral Lord Bridport on 21 June. A French fleet under Vice-Admiral Louis Thomas Villaret de Joyeuse looked to attack the British, and Bridport ordered Standard and two other of Warren's ships into his line of battle to bolster his force. Ellison was stationed a far distance from the main fleet, however, and he was not able to join in time to fight in the Battle of Groix on 23 June. Ellison then re-joined Warren and they sailed for Quiberon Bay on 25 June. Ellison was sent to blockade Belle Île and to overawe the island into surrender with the 38-gun frigate HMS Arethusa and two gunboats under his command. By 16 July talks had broken down and the French governor reaffirmed his republican sympathies, refusing to join the Royalist cause.

Subsequently Standard was attacked by a bout of scurvy, which forced Ellison to land most of his men on the island of Hœdic. Here he created a temporary hospital for his men out of tents and destroyed the French fortifications present. After six weeks the crew had recovered and Ellison was sent with the 74-gun ship of the line HMS Thunderer to take the Count of Artois to Noirmoutier, and while there the two ships captured several American merchant ships. Having returned to Quiberon Bay, the invasion was called off at the end of the year and Ellison returned to England. On 24 February 1796 Ellison was sent to St Helena to escort a convoy of eleven East Indiamen into the Downs. Having completed this on 2 August, Standard was sent into Sheerness Dockyard for a refit and Ellison obtained permission for an acting captain to take over in this ship for four months while he went on leave to recover his health. The East India Company presented him with a gift of 400 guineas in thanks for his services.

=== Marlborough mutiny and retirement ===
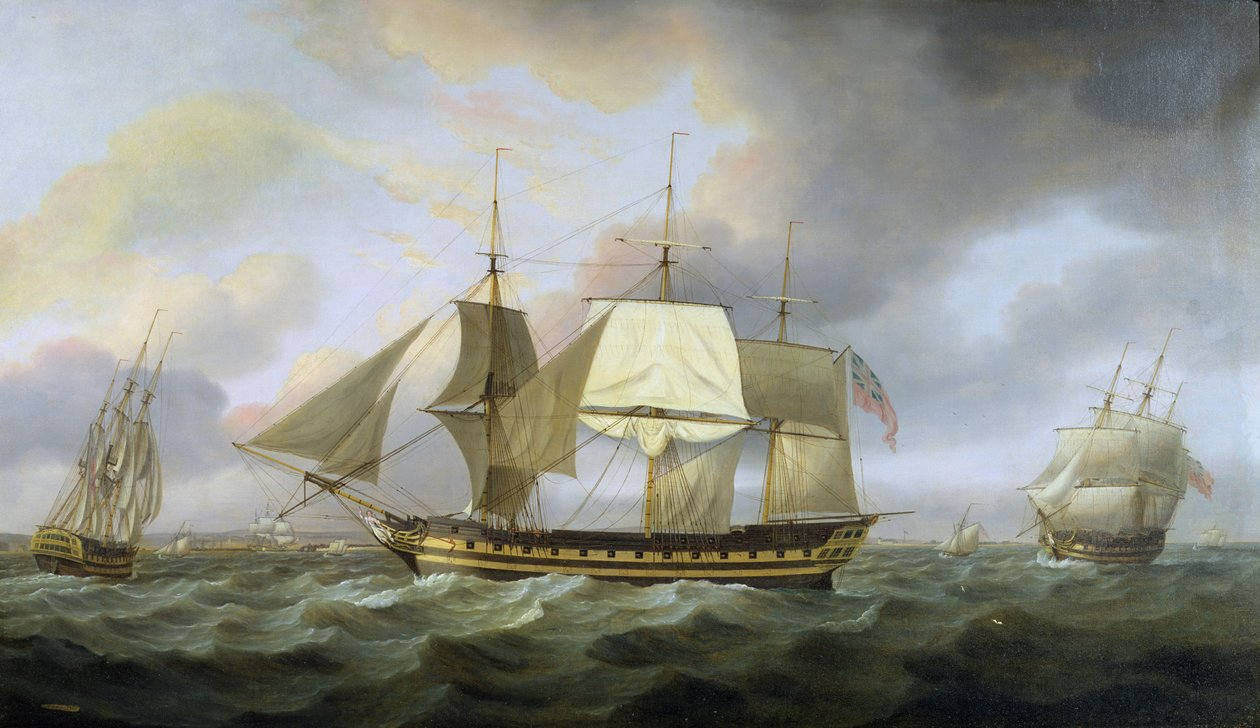
The East Indiaman Belvedere, saved by Ellison

Ellison did not re-join Standard after this and he instead applied to be given command of the 74-gun ship of the line HMS Magnificent which was at the time in ordinary at Plymouth. Magnificent took too long to be made ready and so he was instead given command of the 74-gun ship of the line HMS Marlborough in August 1797. Marlborough had been one of the ships to mutiny in the Spithead mutiny earlier in the year, and her previous captain had left the ship after this event. The crew of Marlborough greeted Ellison positively when he came on board to assume command, and they set sail to join Lord Bridport's fleet off Torbay. Having done so the ships were caught in a gale and the East Indiaman Belvedere was driven towards them, having lost her rudder. Ellison was sent on board to assist in sailing her to safety and as conditions worsened he succeeded in towing her into Spithead, for which he again received the thanks of the East India Company.

Ellison subsequently joined Rear-Admiral Sir Roger Curtis' squadron off the coast of Ireland, but soon after was sent to join Admiral Lord St Vincent's Mediterranean Fleet off Cádiz. Midway through the voyage on 7 May 1798 off Berehaven, Ellison was woken from his sleep by the news that the ship was mutinying and he and his officers were to shortly have their throats cut. He went on deck immediately and took control of Marlborough, dampening the seeds of rebellion among a large group of men that had gathered on the poopdeck. He brought his officers on deck and stayed there for the rest of the night to ensure the crew stayed below. Ellison was eventually able to force the crew to give up the two leaders of the planned mutiny. Marlborough safely reached St Vincent's fleet after this and Ellison requested a court martial for the ringleaders, which produced a death sentence on one of them. Ellison requested to St Vincent that other members of the fleet be the ones to hang the sailor because he felt that his crew would refuse to do so. St Vincent demanded that his crew do it anyway, and had the small boats of the fleet arranged around Marlborough armed with carronades as the hanging took place with orders to fire into Ellison's ship if his crew failed to hang the mutineer as ordered. It was thought that Ellison might have been correct in saying that his crew would not complete the hanging when the men hauling on the rope let it go slack as they began to pull, but this was not the case and the execution took place successfully.

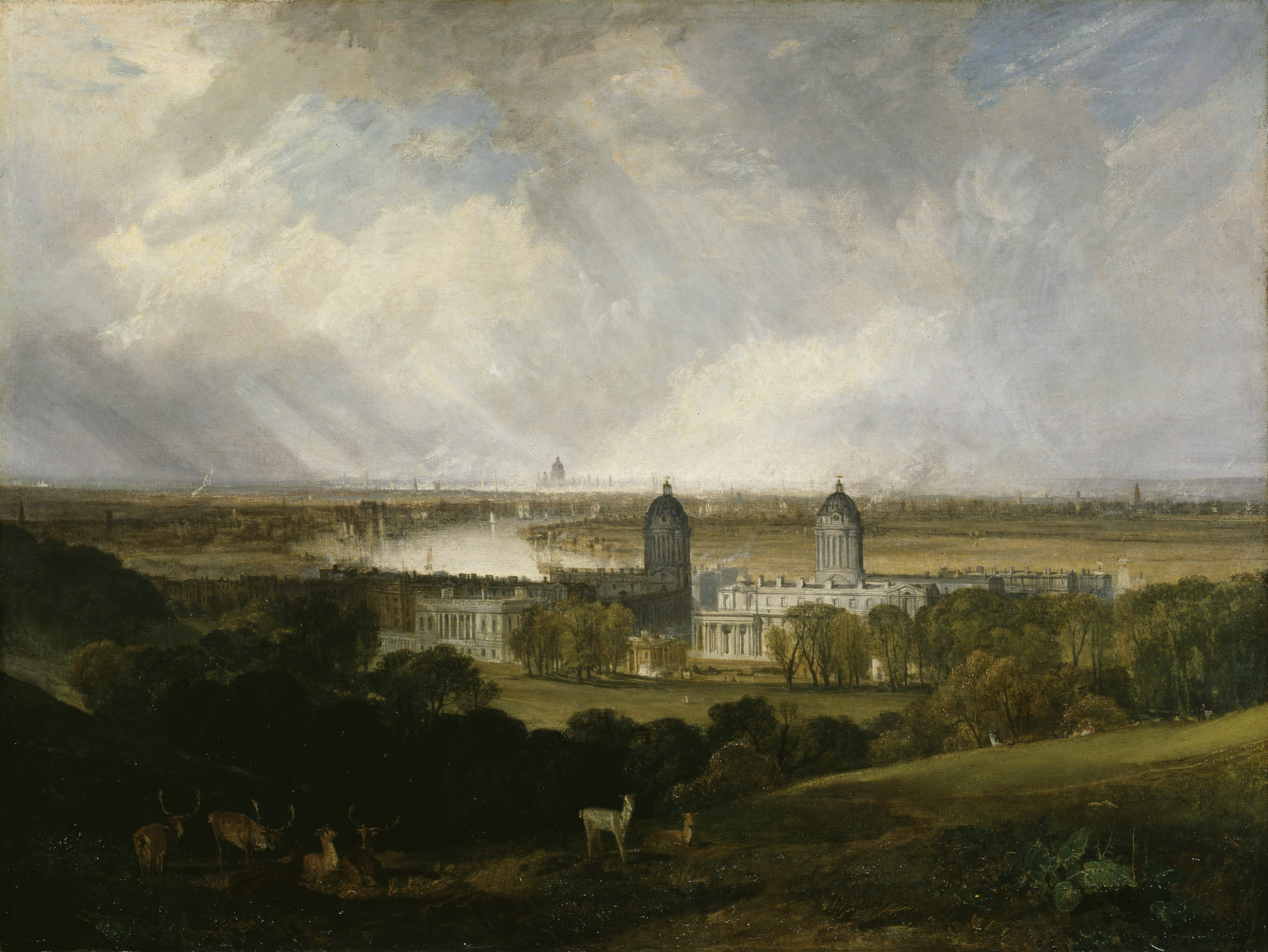
Greenwich Naval Hospital in London from Greenwich Park by William Turner, 1809

In November Ellison's health began to seriously deteriorate once more and he was forced to leave Cádiz and accept a post in the impress service again, this time stationed at Gravesend. He left that service in 1801 when it was broken up at the start of the Peace of Amiens. At some point after this he served as lieutenant-governor of the Royal Naval Hospital, Stonehouse. While he was unable to again serve at sea, Ellison was subsequently appointed the third captain of Greenwich Naval Hospital in 1803, and was promoted to second captain there in 1805 with responsibility for the naval pension fund controlled from the hospital. On 9 November of the same year he was made a superannuated captain in the Royal Navy, and thus received no further promotion in the service. He died on 1 October 1816, aged sixty-three, at his apartments in the hospital. His successor as second captain was Captain Nathaniel Portlock, an old friend of Ellison's who had previously named his son, Major-General Joseph Ellison Portlock, after him.

== Family ==
Ellison married Esther Collis, the daughter of Thomas Collis of Gosport, at Alverstoke in Hampshire on 6 November 1779. Together they had at least three sons and three daughters:

- Lieutenant Charles Pole Hardcastle Ellison (d. 22 March 1816), Royal Navy officer
- Lieutenant Cuthbert Waldegrave Ellison (d. 31 December 1800), Royal Navy officer
- Second Captain Joseph Tomkyns Ellison, Royal Artillery officer
- ? Ellison, married Lieutenant Frederick Gore Wade of the 25th Light Dragoons at Bangalore in March 1810
- Esther Elizabeth Ellison (d. 7 April 1810), married Captain Basden of the 89th Regiment of Foot in 1809
- Dorothea Elizabeth Ellison (d. 21 March 1810)

== Character ==
Ellison was a "popular and courageous officer" according to Anthony Sullivan, a biographer of Saumarez; his presence in naval units was often appreciated by his fellow officers. On a professional level, naval historian Nicholas Tracy writes that he was an "effective administrator, and a captain of men who could be ruthless with those who departed from the code of naval discipline", highlighting the Marlborough mutiny as an exemplar of his abilities. His continued rise through the ranks despite his wounds demonstrates the meritocratic nature of the eighteenth-century navy. However, his competency was questioned after the mutiny by St Vincent, who suggested that his wounds and long service had impacted his ability to command, at one point threatening to replace Ellison in command of Marlborough because of this. Despite this Ellison continued to be well thought of by the majority of his peers; there was much dissatisfaction when the Admiralty refused to increase his wound pension from a lieutenant's rate while he served at Greenwich Naval Hospital, he being one of a small minority not to have their rate reflected by their rank.
