= HMS Standard (1782) =

Intrepid-class ship of the line

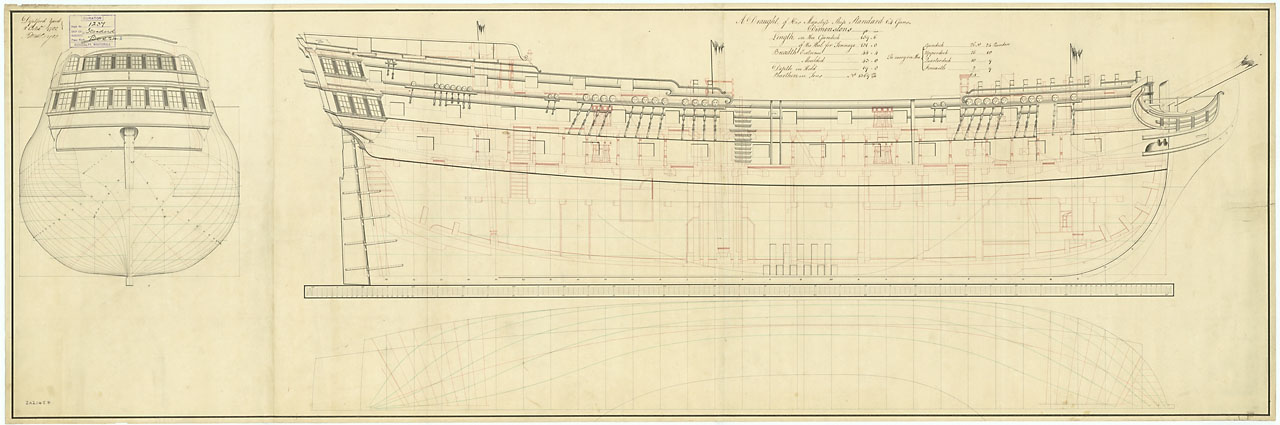
- Plan of Standard

History

Great Britain
- Name: HMS Standard
- Ordered: 5 August 1779
- Builder: Deptford Dockyard
- Laid down: May 1780
- Launched: 8 October 1782
- Fate: Broken up, 1816

General characteristics
- Class & type: Intrepid-class ship of the line
- Tons burthen: 1370 bm
- Length: 159 ft 6 in (48.6 m) (gundeck)
- Beam: 44 ft 4 in (13.5 m)
- Depth of hold: 19 ft (5.8 m)
- Sail plan: Full-rigged ship
- Armament: Gundeck: 26 × 24-pounder guns; Upper gundeck: 26 × 18-pounder guns; QD: 10 × 4-pounder guns; Fc: 2 × 9-pounder guns

HMS Standard was a 64-gun Royal Navy third-rate ship of the line, launched on 8 October 1782 at Deptford. She was the last of the 15 Intrepid-class vessels, which were built to a design by John Williams.

== Early career ==
She was commissioned in September 1782 under Captain William Dickson, and recommissioned in March 1783 as a guardship at Plymouth. She was recommissioned in September 1786 under Charles Chamberlyane, still as a guardship, and paid off in February 1788.

In April 1795 she was recommissioned under Captain Joseph Ellison, for Admiral Sir John Borlase Warren's squadron for the Quiberon operation. Standard sailed for the East Indies on 28 February 1796, temporarily under the command of Captain Lukin. By October she was in the North Sea. In February 1797 she was under Captain Thomas Parr, and then in September under Captain Thomas Revell Shivers.

From mid-April to mid-May, Standard was one of the many vessels caught up in the Nore Mutiny. On 5 May the crew had taken over the ship and trained cannon on officer's country over the issue of pay in arrears. After the mutiny collapsed, William Wallis, one of the leaders on Standard, shot himself to avoid trial and hanging. William Redfern, her surgeon's mate, was sentenced to death for his role in the mutiny, later commuted to transportation for life to the colony of New South Wales.

She was recommissioned in February 1799 as a prison ship at Sheerness under lieutenant Thomas Pamp. In November she was fitted as a convalescent ship at Chatham. One month later she was recommissioned under Lieutenant Jacques Dalby as a hospital ship at Sheerness.

== Mediterranean ==
Between March and May 1801 Standard was re-fitted at Chatham as a 64-gun ship, being commissioned in April under Captain Charles Stewart, for the North Sea. She was paid off, repaired, fitted at various times, and recommissioned in August 1805, Standard was recommissioned under Captain Thomas Harvey. She then sailed to the Mediterranean to join Rear-Admiral Sir Thomas Louis's squadron.

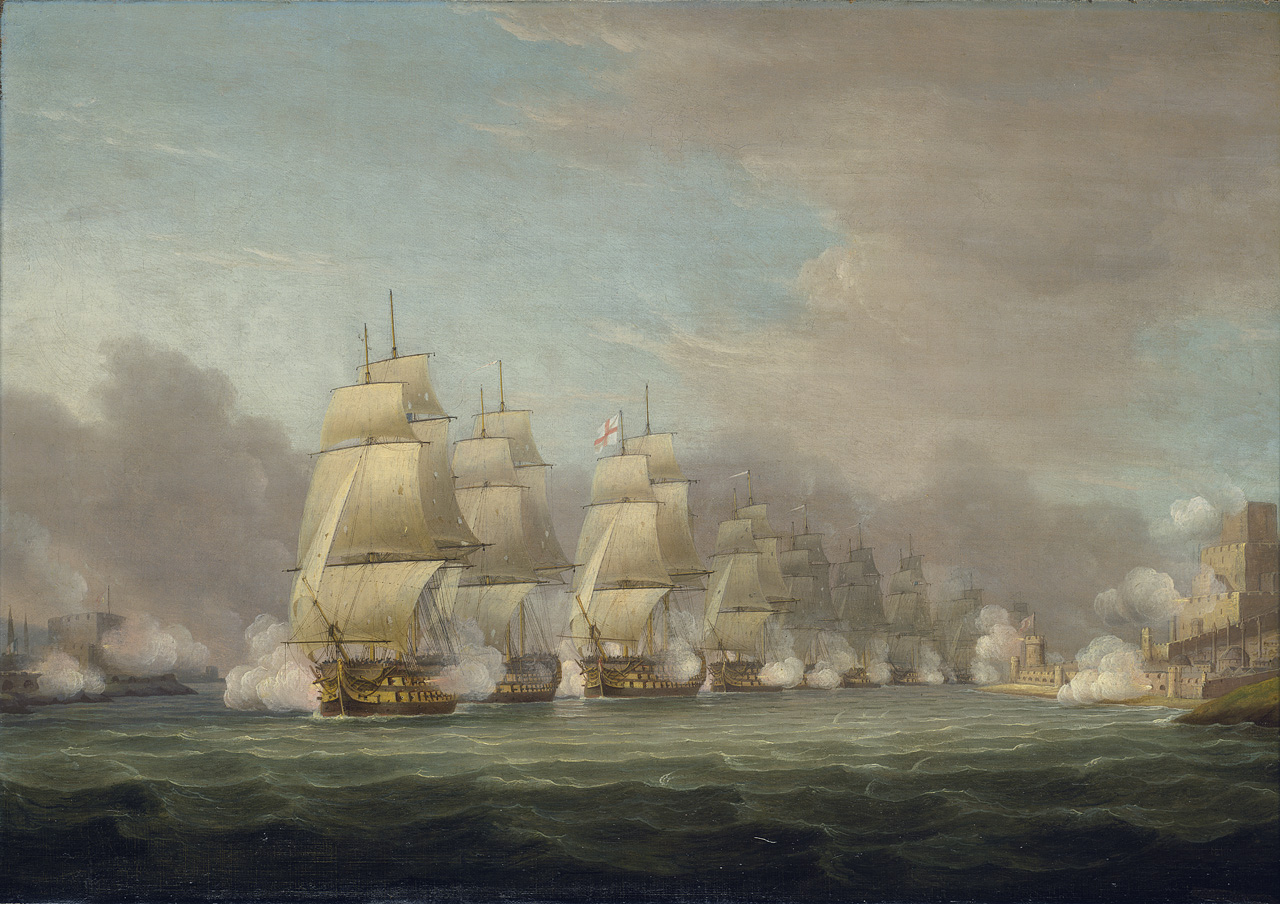
Duckworth's squadron forcing the Dardanelles

While in the Mediterranean she served during Vice Admiral Sir John Duckworth's unsuccessful 1807 Dardanelles Operation. On 19 February, Standard suffered three wounded while forcing the Dardanelles. Near a redoubt on Point Pesquies the British encountered a Turkish squadron of one ship of 64 guns, four frigates and eight other vessels, most of which they ran aground. Marines from Pompee spiked the 31 guns on the redoubt. Standard and Thunderer destroyed three Turkish frigates that had run ashore. On 27 February Standard had two men wounded assisting a Royal Marine landing party on the island of Prota.

On the way out, the Turkish castle at Abydos fired on the British squadron. Granite cannonballs weighing 700–800 pounds (320–360 kg) and measuring 6 ft 6 in (1.98 m) in circumference hit Windsor Castle, Standard, and Active. The shot itself killed four men on Standard. It also started a fire and explosion that led four seamen to jump overboard. In all, Standard lost four dead, 47 wounded, and four missing (believed drowned). In all, the British lost 29 killed and 138 wounded. No ship was lost.

On 26 March 1808, she and the 38-gun frigate Active captured the Franco-Italian brig Friedland, which they took to Malta as a prize. Captain Richard Mowbray of Active took possession of Friedland after a chase of several hours. The brig might have escaped had she not lost her topmast. She was one year old and was armed with 16 French 12-pounder guns. Active took her prize to Malta, together with the prisoners, who included Commodore Don Amilcar Paolucci, commander in chief of the Italian Marine and Knight of the Iron Crown.

On 16 June, Standard was sailing off Corfu when she encountered the Italian gunboat Volpe, which was armed with one iron 4-pounder, and the French dispatch boat Legera. When the wind fell, Harvey sent his pinnace, his cutter and his yawl in pursuit. The British caught up with their quarry after having rowed for two hours. They captured Volpe despite facing stiff resistance and ran Legera aground about four miles north of Cape St. Mary. The French crew took to the rocks above their vessel and kept up a continuous small arms fire on the British seamen who took possession of the vessel and towed her off. They then burned both vessels. Despite the resistance and small arms fire the British had suffered no casualties.

== Last years ==
In 1809 she served in the Gunboat War in the Baltic under Captain Aiskew Hollis. On 18 May a squadron consisting of Standard, the frigate Owen Glendower, and the vessels Avenger, Ranger, Rose, and Snipe captured the island of Anholt. A landing party of seamen and marines under the command of Captain William Selby of Owen Glendower, with the assistance of Captain Edward Nicolls of the Standard's marines, landed. The Danish garrison of 170 men put up a sharp but ineffectual resistance that killed one British marine and wounded two; the garrison then surrendered. The British took immediate possession of the island.

Hollis, in his report, stated that Anholt was important in that it could furnish supplies of water to His Majesty's fleet, and afford a good anchorage to merchant vessels sailing to and from the Baltic. However, the principal objective of the mission was to restore the lighthouse on the island to its pre-war state to facilitate the movement of British men of war and merchantmen navigating the dangerous seas there.

On 19 December 1810 Standard sailed for the Mediterranean again. In February 1811 she was on the Portugal station, temporarily under Captain Joshua Horton. In May she was under the temporary command of Captain Charles Fleming.

On 6 October 1812 Standard arrived at Portsmouth from Cadiz, after having received Pratique. She was ordered to convey some French prisoners of war to Leith.

== Fate ==
Standard was paid off into ordinary in November 1812. She was broken up in 1816.
