= HMS Druid (1783) =

Frigate of the Royal Navy

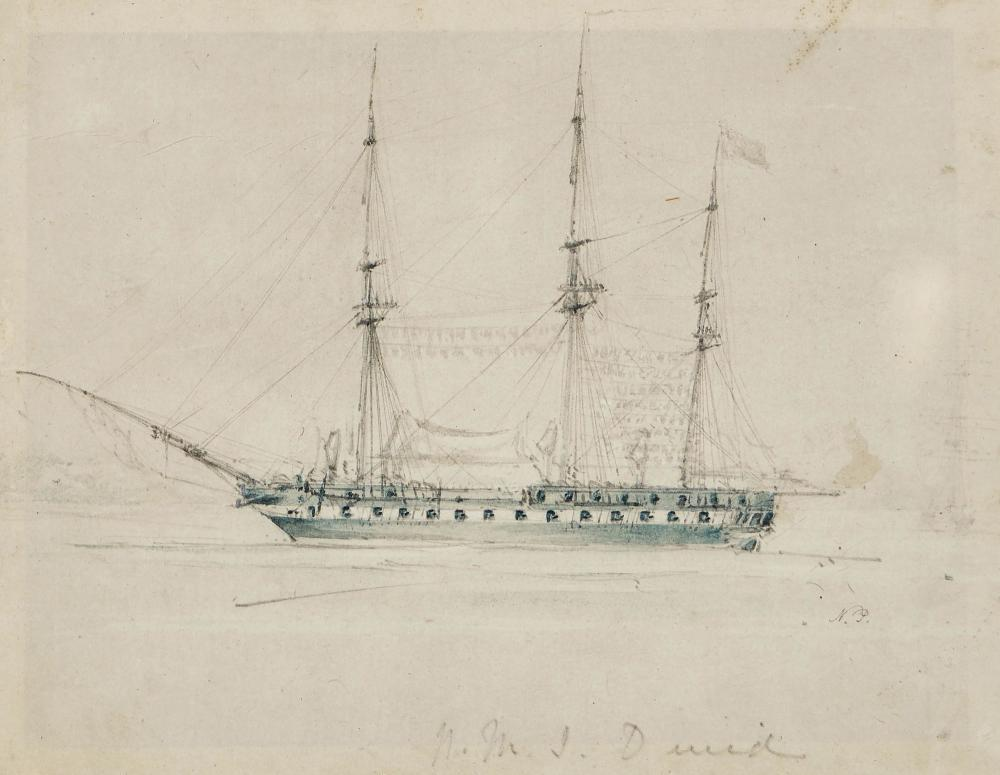
- HMS Druid, by Nicholas Pocock

History

Great Britain
- Name: HMS Druid
- Ordered: 20 March 1780
- Builder: Sydenham Teast, Tombes & Blaming, Bristol
- Laid down: August 1780
- Launched: 16 June 1783
- Completed: By 11 November 1783
- Honours and awards: Naval General Service Medal with clasp "Egypt"
- Fate: Broken up in November 1813

General characteristics
- Class & type: 32-gun Hermione-class fifth-rate frigate
- Tons burthen: 71757/94 (bm)
- Length: 129 ft 1 1/4 in (39.4 m) (overall); 107 ft 9 in (32.8 m) (keel)
- Beam: 35 ft 8 in (10.9 m)
- Depth of hold: 12 ft 8 in (3.9 m)
- Sail plan: Full-rigged ship
- Complement: 220
- Armament: Upper deck: 26 × 12-pounder guns; QD: 4 × 6-pounder guns + 8 × 24-pounder carronades; Fc: 2 × 6-pounder guns + 2 × 24-pounder carronades

HMS Druid was a 32-gun Hermione-class fifth-rate frigate of the British Royal Navy, launched in 1783 at Bristol. She served in the French Revolutionary Wars and the Napoleonic Wars, capturing numerous small prizes. One of her commanders, Captain Philip Broke, described Druid as a "point of honour ship", i.e., a ship too large to run but too small to fight. He and his biographer's view was that it was a disgrace to use a ship like her as a warship. She was broken up in 1813, after a thirty-year career.

== Career ==
Druid entered service in 1783 under the command of Captain John MacBride. He was succeeded the following year by Captain George Byron, who commanded her off Land's End. Captain Joseph Ellison replaced Byron in 1785, and remained in command for the next ten years. Druid served as a Royal escort between 1785 and 1788, returning to service in 1791 after a period paid off and under refit.

=== Druid and the smugglers ===
On 31 January 1788 a boat belonging to Druid captured the smuggler's lugger Revenge in Cawsand Bay. The lugger, under the command of a Henry Carter, belonged to Guernsey and was bringing in alcohol and other prohibited goods. Before Druid's boat could board the lugger, the smugglers fired on it. In the subsequent action, the smugglers killed one of Druid's crew and wounded seven. By the time the boarding party reached the lugger, the master and ten crewmen had fled. The British Government offered a pardon to any smuggler, other than the master, giving information leading to the arrest of two other smugglers, and also offered a reward of £200 to anyone providing information leading to the arrest of two or more smugglers.

=== French Revolutionary wars ===
Druid sailed to Jamaica in April 1792 and, with the outbreak of the French Revolutionary Wars in 1793, returned to operate in home waters.

At some point in 1793 she was in company with Circe when they captured the French merchant vessels Vaudrieul and Diare. Druid herself also captured the Dauphin. In June she captured the French 12-gun privateer Esperance in the English Channel.

In late 1793 Druid served in a small squadron under the command of Sir James Saumarez in the frigate Crescent, together with the brig Liberty and the hired armed cutter Lion. They convoyed some transports with troops for Jersey and Guernsey, and there picked up pilots for Admiral MacBride. On 28 November Saumarez detached Lion to take the pilots to MacBride. On 5 December, Saumarez took his two frigates and the brig to the Isles of Bréhat. As they were maneuvering to attack some French vessels resting there, which escaped, Druid hit a rock, damaging herself. Saumerez sent her and Liberty into Plymouth for repairs.

In early 1794, Druid was in company with Flora, Sheerness, Echo, and Shark when Flora captured the French sloop Viper. Viper was a new sloop of 18 guns and was captured outside of Havre de Grace.

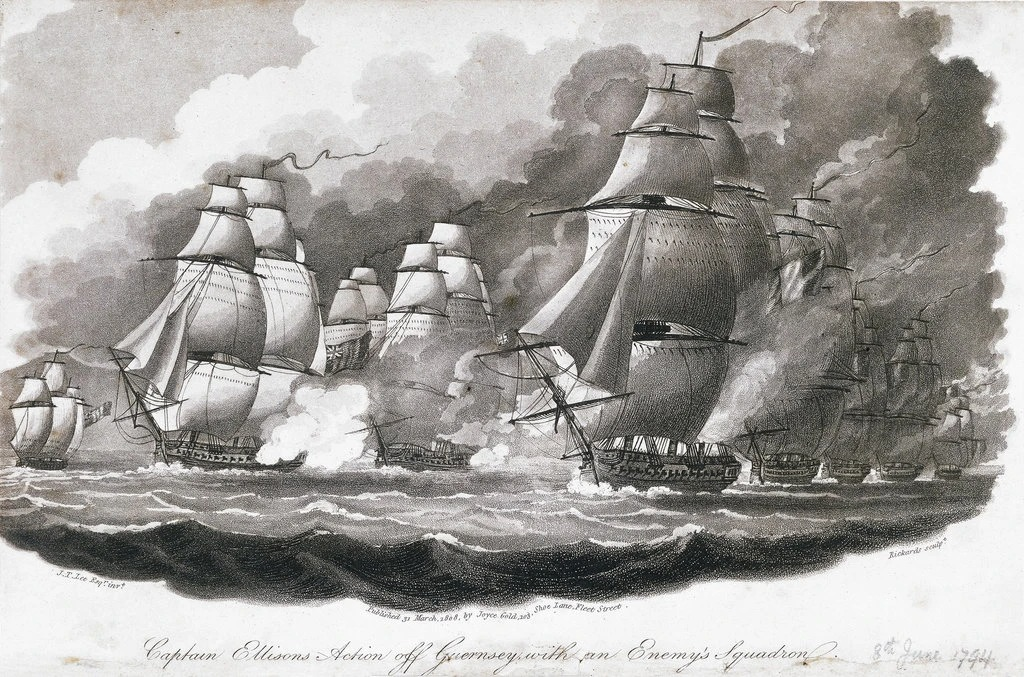
Captain Ellison's action off Guernsey, 8 June 1794, with an enemy squadron

Also in 1794, Druid was part of a frigate squadron that escaped from the 50-gun French Scévola and Brutus.

Druid was at Plymouth on 20 January 1795 and so shared in the proceeds of the detention of the Dutch naval vessels, East Indiamen, and other merchant vessels that were in port on the outbreak of war between Britain and the Netherlands.

In 1795 Captain Robert Carthew Reynolds replaced Ellison, but was himself replaced the same year by Captain Richard King. King convoyed merchant ships to and from Portugal until early 1797, when Druid participated in the operations against the French Expédition d'Irlande. On 7 January she helped Doris and Unicorn capture the Ville de Lorient. Ville de Lorient was a frigate, armed en flute, i.e., she had reduced armament to permit her to serve as a transport. She was carrying 400 hussars to join the rebels in Ireland, together with weapons and supplies.

Druid also shared with Doris and Unicorn in the capture of the French privateer Eclair. Unicorn was the actual captor. Eclair was armed with 18 guns and had a crew of 120 men.

King then moved to another ship, with command of Druid transferring to Captain (acting) Edward Codrington. Druid was paid off in March 1797.

On 5 November 1796 Druid was in company with St. Albans, Caroline and Alcmene when they captured the Spanish ship Adriana.

Druid was fitted out as a 16-gun troopship between February and April 1798 under the command of Commander Edward Abthrorpe. On 14 May she sailed from Margate to take part in Sir Home Popham's failed attack on Ostend. The British troops landed and destroyed some sluices and locks to block gunboats and transports at Flushing from joining an invasion of Britain. However, high surf prevented the retrieval of the troops, and the landing party suffered 60 men dead and wounded, and 1134 captured. The captives included John MacKellar of the frigate Minerva, and his boat crew. The sluices were repaired within weeks.

Druid sailed to the Mediterranean in 1801 to support operations in Egypt. Because Druid served in the navy's Egyptian campaign between 8 March 1801 and 2 September, her officers and crew qualified for the clasp "Egypt" to the Naval General Service Medal that the Admiralty authorised in 1850 for all surviving claimants. (Note: A first-class share of the prize money awarded in April 1823 was worth £34 2s 4d; a fifth-class share, that of a seaman, was worth 3s 11½d. The amount was small as the total had to be shared between 79 vessels and the entire army contingent.)

The next year Druid sailed to the West Indies. Druid came under the command of Commander Charles Ross in 1802, returning to Britain later that year to be paid off.

=== Napoleonic Wars ===
A period of repair and refit began in 1804 which saw her returning to service as a 32-gun fifth rate in April 1805 under the command of Captain Philip Broke. Druid operated from Ireland and soon afterwards captured the privateer Prince Murat on 2 February 1806 after a chase of 90 miles. Prince Murat, under the command of M. Rine Murin, was five days out of Lorient without having made any captures. She was armed with eighteen 6-pounder guns and had a crew of 127 men. Druid sent Prince Murat into Plymouth.

On 1 May 1806 Druid chased the French brig corvette Pandour, bound for France from Senegal, 160 miles into Rear Admiral Charles Stirling's squadron where she was brought to; Druid had to share the prize money with Stirling's entire squadron and so earned relatively little for the long chase. Pandour was under the command of M. Malingre and had a crew of 114 men. She had been armed with eighteen 6-pounder guns, but her crew had thrown two of the guns overboard during the chase. Stirling instructed Broke to bring her into Plymouth, where they arrived on 9 May. (Note: Broke has a detailed account of this capture in which he gives the prize's name as Pandora. The account includes an anecdote about how a drunken gunner on Druid almost blew up his own ship.)

About the same time Druid chased a large frigate into the Passage du Raz, near Brest. She was probably the Topaze. Due to missed communication between Druid and Medusa, Topaze escaped.

Next, Broke caught up with the Guernsey privateer Providence with a view to pressing some of her crew. However, when he heard how she had held off a French privateer off Bilbao, he recognized the crew's courage by leaving the men alone. During this cruise Druid captured a neutral vessel with a Prussian cargo, which made her a legitimate prize. Then Broke chased the Guernsey privateer cutter Hope for some 76 hours before he was able to catch her and impress some seamen from her. Lastly, he sailed Druid northwest of Ireland to intercept the returning Greenland whalers. He was able to impress 12-20 seamen from the whalers to add to Druid's crew. (Note: Men on outbound whalers were on the Protection List, i.e., exempt from impressment. Men on an inbound whaler were no longer exempt.)

Broke was then appointed to Shannon in June 1806 but his replacement, Captain John R. Bennett, came aboard Druid on 31 August. Therefore, when Druid captured Swanen on 2 July, she was still under Broke's command. (Note: Because she was at sea, Broke did not actually join Shannon until 14 September.)

Captain Donald H. Mackay then replaced Bennet. On 14 February 1808, Druid captured the Danish brig Catharina.

Captain Captain Sir William Bolton took command later in 1808. On 19 March 1809 Druid captured the schooner Belle Hortense. The schooner Hortense, prize to Druid, arrived at Portsmouth from Martinique on 10 April. On 25 June Druid captured the French private ship of war Jenny and her cargo.

On 13 November Druid captured the French navy brig Basque, armed with 16 guns with a crew of 112 men under the command of lieutenant de vaisseaux Liscourt. She had been sailing from Bayonne to Guadaloupe, with flour and other stores. The Royal Navy took Basque into service as Foxhound.

On 23 November Druid brought a French brig, that may or may not have been Basque, into Cork. Druid had sighted three strange sails at night. There being no wind, Bolton sent out three boats, admonishing the officers to take care and to attack if any of the vessels should be a French warship. Unfortunately, the officers did not heed the warning and went in seriatim, with their quarry killing or capturing their crews. Bolton was unaware of what had happened. The French vessel then took to her sweeps. Next morning Bolton followed her with his sweeps, but again lost her that night. By chance, on the second morning he encountered her again, and this time there was enough of a breeze that he could catch her after a chase. When he did, the newspaper accounts report that he found that she was a large privateer. He also was able to recover those of his men who had been taken prisoner. Apparently, Druid had lost 10 men killed and wounded, in addition to the 17 prisoners that he recovered. The two brigs that had been with the French vessel on the first night had long escaped.

In August 1810 Captain Sir John Lewis assumed command, sailing Druid for the Mediterranean on 28 August. In May 1811 Captain John Searle took command, followed the next month by Captain Abel Ferris. Druid then sailed for the Mediterranean on 12 June. In May 1812 Captain Francis Stanfell took command in the Mediterranean. Between the end of 1811 and early 1812, Druid supported the British capture of Tarifa, near Cadiz.

== Fate ==
By 1813 Druid had returned to home waters and was under Captain William King. She was broken up at Woolwich in November 1813.
