= Rolla (1805 ship) =

French and British merchant, slave, privateer, and naval brig 1805–1825

History

France
- Launched: 1801, or 1803
- Captured: c.1804

United Kingdom
- Name: Rolla
- Owner: J. Ratcliffe
- Acquired: c1805 by purchase of a prize
- Fate: Captured 1805

France
- Name: Rolla
- Acquired: Late 1805, by capture
- Captured: February 1806

United Kingdom
- Name: HMS Rolla
- Acquired: First quarter 1806 by capture
- Fate: Sold 1810

United Kingdom
- Name: Rolla
- Owner: Various
- Acquired: 1810 by purchase
- Fate: Possibly lost December 1825; last listed 1826

General characteristics
- Type: Ship
- Displacement: 200 tons (French)
- Tons burthen: 1528/94, or 160, or 165 (bm)
- Length: Overall: 80 ft 4 in (24.5 m); Keel: 64 ft 10 in (19.8 m)
- Beam: 21 ft 0 in (6.4 m)
- Draught: 11 ft 1 in (3.4 m) (laden)
- Crew: 1805:50; 1805:26
- Armament: 1805: 16 × 4&6-pounder guns; 1805: 4 × 6-pounder + 12 × 4-pounder guns; HMS: 8 × 18-pounder carronades + 2 × 6-pounder chase guns; 1811 on:4-10 guns (in wartime)

Rolla was a French brig launched in 1801 or 1803 (records differ), that came into British hands in 1804. She became a privateer and then a slave ship in the triangular trade in enslaved people, but before she was able to embark any captives the French Navy captured her. The British Royal Navy recaptured her and took her into service as HMS Rolla. She served in Sir Home Riggs Popham's attack on Buenos Aires. She returned to Britain in December 1807 and was laid up. The Admiralty sold her in 1810 and she became a merchant vessel. She was last listed in 1826, and may have been lost on the coast of Brazil in 1825.

== Career ==
=== Merchantman ===
Rolla entered Lloyd's Register in 1805. However, even before her listing she had received a letter of marque. Captain William Miller received the letter on 23 January 1805. The letter declares a rather large crew, suggesting that her owner, J. Ratcliffe, intended to use her as a privateer. The entry in the 1806 Lloyd's Register gives the name of Rolla's master as W. Byass, and her trade as Liverpool-Africa, indicating a slave-trader. Byass received a letter of marque on 24 August 1805. She sailed from Liverpool on 31 August 1805, but as she was on her way to gather slaves in West Africa the Spanish (or the French) captured her.

=== French navy ===
Admiral Linois's squadron was on its way back to France from the Indian Ocean when it captured Rolla on either 22 November 1805 or 5 December. On 18 April 1806 Lloyd's List (LL) reported that a privateer had captured Rolla, of Liverpool, and another vessel, off Loango. (Note: The other vessel was Resource, of Liverpool, that Marengo, Linois's flagship, had captured on 8 December off the coast of Africa. Marengo had sent Resource to the Cape of Good Hope, not realising that the British were about to capture the Cape. Diomede and Encounter captured Resource as she approached Table Bay.)

=== Royal Navy ===
The Royal Navy recaptured Rolla on 21 February at the Cape of Good Hope as she sailed into Table Bay. The British took Rollo and the captain of the prize crew, enseigne de vaisseau Vermet, by surprise and were able to capture some of Linois' letters. (Note: The French valued Rolla at about 6000 piasters.) (Note: In July 1810 there was a distribution of money for the capture of two French vessels taken at the Cape of Good Hope, Rolla on 21 February and Volontaire on 4 March: A petty officer's share of the prize money for Volontaire was £6 5s 0½d; an able seaman's share was £1 11s 6d. For Rolla the amounts were 15s 0½d and 3s 10d.) Home Popham purchased her there.

Home Popham decided to attack Buenos Aires and sailed there from the Cape of Good Hope. On 21 August the second wave of British vessels, Rolla among them, set sail. Rolla served as a transport, carrying a detachment of the 38th Regiment of Foot. On the way Woolwich, Porpoise, and the brig Rolla on 14 May 1806 detained and sent into the Cape of Good Hope the Danish packet ship Three Sisters (or Trende Sostre).

At Montevideo Rolla apparently served to ferry provisions. In November, Home Popham returned to London to face a court martial for having left the Cape. (Note: He left in a second Rolla. This was an American brig that Medusa and Diomede had detained. Rolla had sailed through the British blockade of Montevideo on 5 September 1806 during a fog. She left on 19 November, only to have Medusa detain her. Popham had created a Vice admiralty court at Montevideo that condemned her as a prize. The owners challenged the seizure in British courts on a variety of grounds, including that Popham's attack on the River Plate was unauthorized, but Judge Sir William Scott upheld the condemnation, and his decision survived further appeal.)

Then in December Rolla was commissioned under Lieutenant Joseph Acott. On 10 February 1807 she sailed to Rio Grande with an army commissary officer aboard to procure provisions from the Portuguese. While Rollo was at Montevideo she suffered from desertions. This was a consequence of the fact that when Popham had drawn on the other vessels in his fleet to man her, their captains sent over their worst men.

Between 24 and 28 June Rolla was part of the fleet that moved the troops from Montevideo to attack Buenos Aires. After the British defeat, on 9 July Rolla sailed for Montevideo.

Rolla was docked at Portsmouth between 7 November and 4 December 1807. She then disappears from records, suggesting that she was laid up. Furthermore, on 13 February 1808 the Navy launched a new HMS Rolla. As the Navy tended to avoided having two serving vessels sharing a name, the reuse of the name is consistent with the first Rolla no longer being active.

=== Disposal ===
The "Principal Officers and Commissioners of His Majesty's Navy" offered "Rolla, lying at Portsmouth", for sale on 24 March 1810. she sold there on that day.

=== Merchantman again, and fate ===
Rolla re-entered Lloyd's Register (LR) in 1811. She then sailed under various masters and to a variety of different destinations. From 1818 on her master was listed as Cowley, her owner as Hancock, and her trade Liverpool-Brazil. Lloyd's List reported that on 7 December 1817 "The Rolla, Cowley, had sailed from Paraimbo for Liverpool...and has not since been heard of." However, Rolla continued to be listed and occasionally there were mentions of a Rolla in Lloyd's List. Then a report dated New York, 9 November 1825, reported that "The Rolla, from Buenos Aires to Havannah, is lost on the coast of Brazil."

Launch year	Master	Owner	Trade
1811	A. Gordon	Conyers and Nixon	Falmouth-Senegal
1812	A. Gooden; J. Forbes	Nixon & Co.	London-Grenada; London-Mogadore
1813	R. Douglas	Nixon & Co.	London-Malta
1814	R. Douglas; W. Gray	Nixon & C9.	London-Corunna
1815	W. Grey; J. Wallace	Hodgson	London–Gibraltar; London-New York
1816	J. Wallace; Anderson	M'Guire	London-New York; London-Brazils
1817		Lloyd's Register not published	
1818	Cowley	Hancock	Liverpool-Brazils
1819	Cowley	Hancock	Liverpool-Brazils
1820	Cowley	Hancock	Liverpool-Brazils
1821	Cowley	Hancock	Liverpool-Brazils
1822	Cowley	Hancock	Liverpool-Brazils
1823	Cowley	Hancock	Liverpool-Brazils
1824	Cowley	Hancock	Liverpool-Brazils
