= French brig Friedland (1807) =

French brig from Venice

Friedland
History

France
- Name: Friedland
- Namesake: Battle of Friedland
- Builder: Venice
- Laid down: November 1806
- Launched: 14 March 1807
- Captured: 26 March 1808

United Kingdom
- Name: Delight
- Acquired: 26 March 1808 by capture
- Fate: Sold 1 September 1814

General characteristics
- Class & type: Friedland-class
- Displacement: 360 tons (French)
- Tons burthen: 340 33/94 (bm)
- Length: 97 ft 6 in (29.7 m) (overall); 76 ft 1 in (23.19 m) (keel)
- Beam: 29 ft 0 in (8.8 m)
- Draught: 3.50 m (11.5 ft) (unloaded)
- Depth of hold: 4.38 m (14.4 ft)
- Sail plan: Brig
- Complement: French service:112; British service:100
- Armament: French service: 16 × 12-pounder guns (at capture); British service:14 × 24-pounder carronades + 2 × 6-pounder chase guns

Friedland was the name-ship of her class of French Illyrien or Friedland-class brig. She was built at Venice and launched in June 1807. The Royal Navy captured her a year later and took her into service as HMS Delight. She served in the Mediterranean and was sold in 1814.

== Friedland ==
Friedland initially bore the name Illyrien, but had her name changed to Vendicare in early 1807. Then she received a second name change, to Friedland, after launch, to commemorate the Emperor Napoleon's victory on 14 June at the battle of Friedland.

Friedland was at Ancona in December 1807, and at Corfu between 1807 and 1808. She is recorded as being at Santa Maria di Leuca in March 1808.

== Capture ==
On 26 March 1808, Friedland was on her way to Corfu with Commodore Don Amilcar Paolucci, commander in chief of the Italian Marine, and Knight of the Iron Crown, when she encountered two British warships that were part of the British blockade of the island. The 64-gun third rate HMS Standard and the 38-gun frigate HMS Active captured Friedland off Cape Blanco, at the south end of Corfu. (Note: Although there were almost a dozen capes in the Mediterranean named Cape Blanco, the Cape Blanco in question was the one at 39°28′N 20°6′E.) Captain Richard Mowbray of Active took possession of Friedland after a chase of several hours. Friedland might have escaped had she not lost her topmast. Her captors described her as one year old, and armed with 16 French 12-pounder guns. Active took her prize to Malta, together with the prisoners, who included Commodore Paolucci, and her captain, Angelo Thomasi.

== HMS Delight ==
Friedland was commissioned in May as HMS Delight in the Mediterranean under Commander John Brett Purvis.

On 28 November 1808 Delight, Active, the supply ship Woolwich, and the hired armed ship Lord Eldon escorted a convoy of 50 vessels out of Malta, bound for Gibraltar, Lisbon, and London. However, contrary winds forced about 40 merchantmen, and the escorts to return to Malta within two weeks.

Purvis received promotion to post-captain on 16 September 1809. In December Commander Lord Balgonie took command of Delight. Delight arrived at Portsmouth on 25 July 1810. She apparently remained in service until 1812. Lord Balgonie was promoted to post-captain on 28 February 1812.

== Fate ==
Delight was in ordinary in 1812, at Chatham, and apparently remained in ordinary until 1814. The Principal Officers and Commissioners of the Navy first offered the "Delight, sloop, of 340 tons", lying at Portsmouth for sale on 9 June 1814. Delight sold there on 1 September for £480.
