= HMS Woolwich (1785) =

Frigate of the Royal Navy

Woolwich
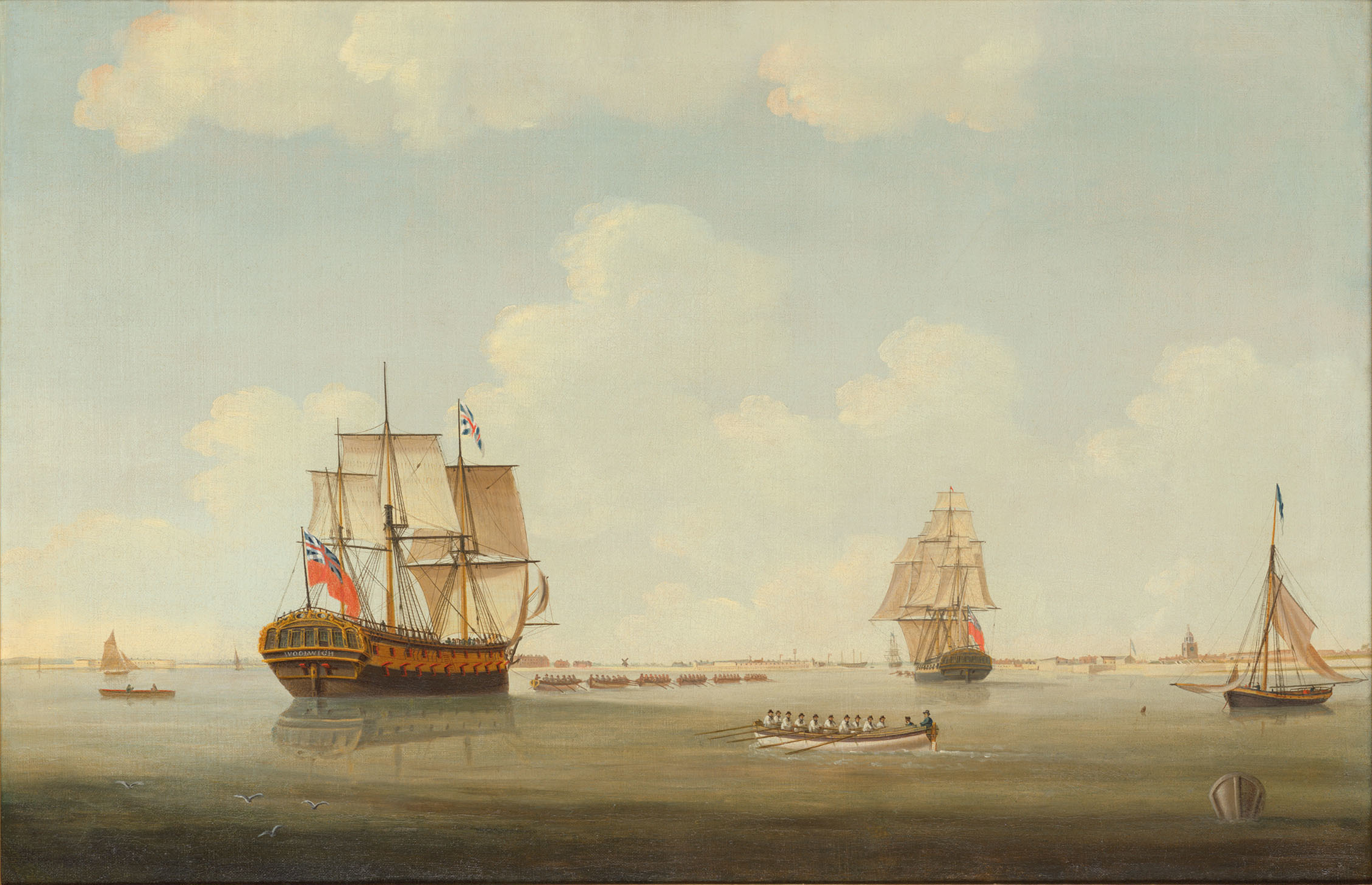
- Woolwich under tow in Portsmouth harbour, painted by Thomas Elliott in 1795

History

Great Britain
- Name: Woolwich
- Ordered: 5 March 1782
- Builder: Thomas Calhoun & John Nowlan, Bursledon (Note: The National Maritime Museum database gives the builder as "J. Luckhue".)
- Laid down: January 1783
- Launched: 15 December 1785
- Honours and awards: Naval General Service Medal with clasps: "17 Mar. Boat Service 1794"; "Egypt"
- Fate: Wrecked 1813

General characteristics
- Tons burthen: 90680/94 (bm)
- Length: 140 ft (42.7 m) (overall); 115 ft 2 1/2 in (35.1 m) (keel)
- Beam: 38 ft 6 in (11.7 m)
- Depth of hold: 16 ft 9 1/4 in (5.1 m)
- Complement: 300 (294 from 1794)
- Armament: 1792: Lower deck: 20 × 18-pounder guns; UD: 22 × 12-pounder guns; QD: 4 × 12-pounder guns; Fc: 2 × 6-pounder guns; 1793: Lower deck: 20 × 18-pounder guns; UD: 22 × 24-pounder carronades; QD: 4 × 13-pounder guns; Fc: 2 × 6-pounder guns; 1799: 22 × 9-pounder guns (UD)

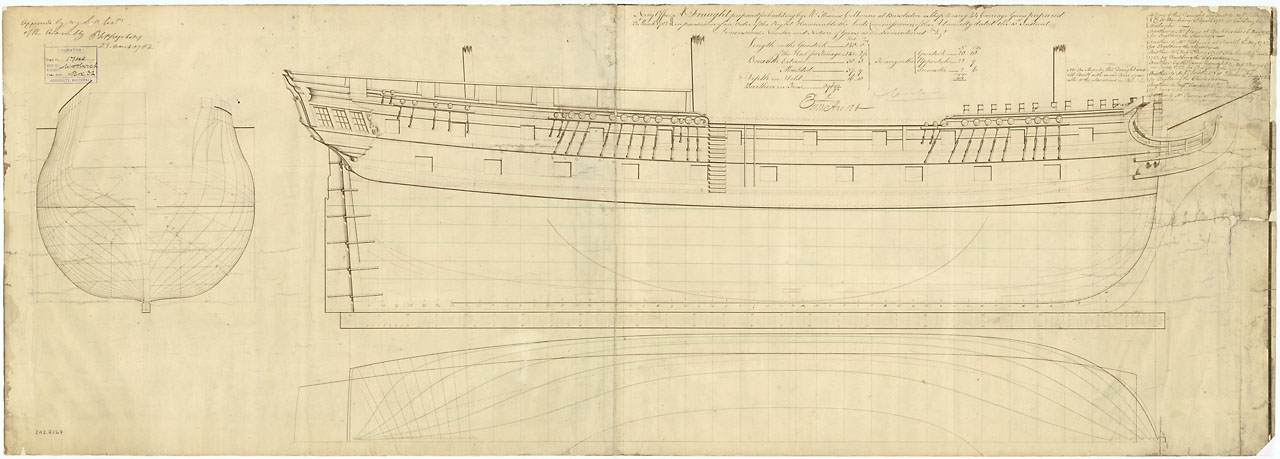
Plan of the Woolwich

HMS Woolwich was an Adventure-class frigate launched in 1784. She essentially spent her career as a storeship until she was wrecked in 1813.

== Career ==
It is not clear when Woolwich was completed. She was not commissioned until 1790, under the command of Commander William Nowell, who paid her off in November.

Commander John Parker recommissioned her on 18 January 1793 as a storeship. He sailed her to the Mediterranean, before returning to Britain in October. She then sailed for the Leeward Islands on 26 November 1793, arriving in time to be present at the capture of Martinique in February 1794 under Admiral Sir John Jervis. She also participated in the capture of Guadeloupe. Woolwich was among the vessels whose crews qualified for the Naval General Service Medal (NGSM), which the Admiralty issued in 1847 to all surviving claimants, with clasp "17 Mar. Boat Service 1794" for the capture of the French frigate Bienvenue and other vessels in Fort Royal Bay.

The London Gazette published details for four tranches of prize and head money payments for Jervis's campaign. In all some 36 ships qualified, including Woolwich [sic].

Year	Martinique	St Lucia	Guadaloupe	All three
Captain's share
1795	£150 0s 1 3/4d	£24 10s 1 1/2d	£29 10s 3 1/4d	£203 11s 4 3/4d
1797	£29 6s 8 1/2d	£12 9s 1 1/4d	£9 7s 2 1/4d	£51 3s 0d
1800	£695 16s 8 1/4d	£10 7s 6 1/4d	£71 0s 3 1/4d	£777 4s 6 3/4d
1806	£51 4s 2 1/2d	£5 12s 0d	£12 12 6 1/4	£69 8s 8 3/4
Total	£926 7s 9d	£52 14s 9d	£122 10s 3d	£1,102 7s 8 1/4d
Seaman's share
1795	£0 15s 4 3/4d	£0 2s 5 1/4d	£0 3s 0d	£1 0s 10d
1797	£0 3s 0d	£0 1s 3d	£0 0s 11 1/4d	£0 5s 2 1/4d
1800	£3 5s 9 1/4d	£0 0s 11 1/2d	£0 6s 8d	£5 13s 4 3/4d
1806	£0 4s 10d	£0 0s 6 1/4d	£0 1s 2d	£0 6s 6 1/4d
Total	£4 9s 0d	£5 2s 0d	£0 12s 7 1/4d	£10 11s 7 1/4d

In 1795, Woolwich was under the command of Commander William Charles Fahie. However, Lieutenant Henry Probyn assumed acting command on 8 December. (Note: He returned to Britain in May 1796 and on 18 August was officially promoted to the rank of commander.) In March 1796 Commander Daniel (or William) Dobree was appointed to command Woolwich. Between 21 April and 25 May Woolwich took part in Admiral Sir Hugh Cloberry Christian and Lieutenant-General Sir Ralph Abercromby's invasion of Santa Lucia. Dobree commanded a division of flat boats for the landings at Choc Bay and Anse La Raye. He returned her to Britain in October 1797 and paid her off.

Commander Michael Halliday (or Haliday) recommissioned Woolwich in August 1798 for the Channel Fleet. She then sailed for the Cape of Good Hope. In 1799 the Navy removed most of her armament, arming her en flute. On 29 June 1799, Halliday was promoted to post captain in Leander.

In October 1799, Commander George Jardine replaced Halliday. Jardine sailed for the Mediterranean on 9 January 1801. He carried as passengers the Earl of Cork and the Honourable Colonel Bligh, who were going to join their regiments. Because Woolwich served in the navy's Egyptian campaign (8 March to 2 September 1801), her officers and crew qualified for the clasp "Egypt" to the NGSM. Woolwich returned to Britain in July 1801.

A series of commander followed. In August Commander Robert Campbell replaced Jardine, who died on board the packet Arabella on 21 June as he was returning to England. In February 1802 Commander Richard Bridges replace Campbell. Then in May, Commander Ulick Jennings replaced Bridges. He sailed Woolwich to the West Indies in September. On 14 September, Woolwich was at Madeira when the Portuguese vessel Aurora caught fire after an explosion. Woolwich was nearby and her boats were able to rescue two men; the other 32 people on board Aurora perished, including her captain. Jennings returned to Britain on 11 February 1803. (Note: Ulick Jennings was dismissed the service in Jamaica on 1 or 2 December. He was found guilty of "drunkenness and unofficer-like and irregular behavior".) Commander Thomas Burton replaced Jennings in March 1803. Woolwich then went into ordinary in May.

In October 1804, Commander Thomas Garth recommissioned her. In June 1805 Commander Francis Beaufort joined her as she was fitting out. She went first to the East Indies and then escorted a convoy of East Indiamen back to Britain. Then the Admiralty tasked him with of conducting a hydrographic survey of the Rio de la Plata estuary in South America during Home Popham's unsuccessful campaign to capture Buenos Aires. On the way Woolwich, Porpoise, and the brig Rolla on 14 May 1806 detained and sent into the Cape of Good Hope the Danish packet ship Three Sisters (or Trende Sostre). After the failure of the British invasion, Woolwich returned to the Cape and then to the Mediterranean. In 1808 Beaufort moved to Blossom.

On 28 November 1808, Woolwich, HMS Active, Delight, and the hired armed ship Lord Eldon escorted a convoy of 50 vessels out of Malta, bound for Gibraltar, Lisbon, and London. However, contrary winds forced about 40 merchantmen, and the escorts to return to Malta within two weeks.

In 1809, Richard Turner was master of Woolwich, which served in the Mediterranean. In 1812 she was in the West Indies under Richard Rumer, master.

In February 1813, Woolwich came under the command of Commander Thomas Ball Sullivan. She then conveyed Sir James Lucas Yeo, 36 officers, and some 450 seamen, as well as the frames of several gun-vessels, from England to Quebec, arriving on 6 May. The gun-vessels were intended for service on the Great Lakes.

== Fate ==
Woolwich sailed from Bermuda on 26 August 1813 in company with a merchant vessel bound for Dominica. On 8 September the weather worsened, and by 11 September Woolwich was caught in a gale. By six o'clock, land suddenly appeared under her bow and within minutes she was aground. She lost her rudder, bilged immediately, and fell on her side. By morning the weather had cleared and her crew went ashore on what they discovered was the island of Barbuda. Sullivan and his officers were surprised as they had thought that they were 90 miles from the island. However, the gale and a strong current had driven Woolwich off-course. The crew was saved.

Vine, Thompson, master, the merchant vessel that Woolwich had been escorting, also wrecked on Barbuda. However, her cargo was saved.
