= Lord Eldon (1824 ship) =

History

United Kingdom
- Name: Lord Eldon
- Namesake: John Scott, 1st Earl of Eldon
- Owner: J. Noble
- Builder: Sunderland
- Launched: 1824
- Fate: Burnt 1828

General characteristics
- Tons burthen: 227 (bm)

Lord Eldon was launched at Sunderland in 1824. She appeared in LR in 1828 with M.Cooper, master, J. Noble, owner, and trade Liverpool–Rio de Janeiro.

On 20 August 1828 Lord Eldon and the American ship Huzzar were approaching Buenos Aires under escort by an Argentinian privateer. (It is possible that both were prizes to the privateer.) The three vessels encountered a Brazilian naval squadron that was blockading Buenos Aires during the Cisplatine War. The Brazilians captured all three vessels and burnt the two merchantmen.
