= Lord Eldon (1801 ship) =

British merchant ship (1801–1818)

History

United Kingdom
- Name: Lord Eldon
- Namesake: Lord Eldon
- Builder: Sunderland
- Launched: 1801
- Fate: Damaged 1817; last listed in 1818

General characteristics
- Tons burthen: 1802: 335; 1814: 379(bm)
- Propulsion: Sail
- Armament: 1804:14 × 18-pounder carronades; 1814:8 × 18-pounder carronades

Lord Eldon was launched at Sunderland in 1801. She was initially a London-based transport, but new owners contracted with the Admiralty. From certainly 1804 through approximately 1811 she served the British Royal Navy as a hired armed ship. During this period Spanish vessels captured her, but the Royal Navy recaptured her. Between 1812 and 1813 she underwent lengthening. In 1814 she returned to serving as a transport. She was driven ashore and damaged in 1817; she was no longer listed in 1819.

== Transport ==
Lord Eldon appears in Lloyd's Register in 1802 with W. Dunn, master, Kave, owner, and trade: London transport. The Register of Shipping for 1804 notes that she was built in part of old materials, and that she received copper sheathing in 1804; her master is J. Shields and her owner is Sanderson, but she is now armed, and her trade is London-government service.

== Hired armed ship ==
Lord Eldon is variously described as an "armed defense ship", a "hired armed ship", or simply "armed ship". The Navy Board usually hired the vessel complete with master and crew rather than bareboat. Contracts were for a specified time or on an open-ended monthly hire basis. The Admiralty provided a regular naval officer to be the commander. The civilian master then served as the sailing master. For purposes of prize money or salvage, hired armed vessels received the same treatment as naval vessels.

The first mention of her in readily available sources was on 29 October 1804. The London Star reported that "also arrived the hired armed ship Lord Eldon, from a cruise".

Then on 12 November 1804 Lord Eldon was under the command of Commander Francis Newcombe when eight or ten gunboats captured her off Algeciras. However, two days later HMS Eurydice and HMS Bittern recaptured her and sent her into Gibraltar. Her master and seven sailors had been wounded. (Note: Although the London Gazette gives the date of recapture as 14 November 1805, the news item from Lloyd's List makes it clear that the recapture took place in November 1804, so most probably on 14 November 1804.)

In February 1806 Newcombe took command of HMS Beagle. His replacement on Lord Eldon was Commander G.B. Whinyates.

In 1807 Commander John Bradly took command of Lord Eldon on the coast of Spain. His replacement at the end of the year was again Commander G.B. Whinyates.

On 28 November 1808 HMS Delight, HMS Active, the supply ship HMS Woolwich, and Lord Eldon escorted a convoy of 50 vessels out of Malta, bound for Gibraltar, Lisbon, and London. However, contrary winds forced the escorts and about 40 merchantmen to return to Malta within two weeks.

In 1808/09 Lord Eldon was under the command of Commander C.C. Fisher.

At some point before 1810 Commander Charles Chamberlayne Irvine too commanded Lord Eldon.

Lord Eldon was still listed in the 1811 Register of Shipping as being on government service. Her master was still J. Shields, but her owner was Saunders. She is not listed in the 1812 volume.

== Transport ==
Lord Eldon returned to the 1814 Register of Shipping with R. Simey, master, J. Spence, owner, and trade London transport. During her absence from the lists she had been lengthened, with the result that her burthen had increased. Her owners had also reduced her armament.

In 1816 Lord Eldon carried the Corps of Colonial Marines from Bermuda to Trinidad to be disbanded upon arrival there on 20 August 1816. The former Colonial Marines founded the community that became known as the Merikins.

== Loss ==
On 7 May 1817, a heavy gale drove Lord Eldon, Clay, master, onshore at Kirkwall while she was on her way from Sunderland to Quebec. Initial reports were that she would probably be got off, but that she had lost her rudder and was leaky. She was got off, but with so much damage that she was unable to proceed. Other records show that she was declared a loss on 24 May.

Berry Castle, of Aberdeen, Pratt, master, took on board 100 passengers from Lord Eldon, and was to sail on 21 May.

The Register of Shipping still listed Lord Eldon in 1818, but no longer listed her in 1819.
