= Lord Eldon (1830 ship) =

History

United Kingdom
- Name: Lord Eldon
- Namesake: John Scott, 1st Earl of Eldon
- Owner: 1830:John Irving and John Irving, jr. (both of Bristol); 1836:George Pocock Irving (Bristol); 1839:Somes; 1840:Worsall & Co.
- Builder: Chepstow
- Launched: 1830
- Fate: Wrecked December 1844

General characteristics
- Tons burthen: 337, or 3373/94 (bm)
- Length: 104 ft 11 1/2 in (32.0 m)
- Beam: 27 ft 0 in (8.2 m)
- Depth: 19 ft 4 in (5.9 m)

Lord Eldon was launched at Chepstow in 1830. She traded with the West Indies, Australia, Siam, and India. She was wrecked at Madras in December 1844.

== Career ==
Lord Eldon's first master was Christopher Wrangles. On 19 November 1830 David Dawson replaced him. She first appeared in Lloyd's Register LR in 1830. It gave her trade as Bristol–Tobago.

Solomon Wilkinson replaced Dawson on 9 July 1834 (London). On 29 July 1836 her registry was shifted to London. In 1839 her owner was J. Somes, London. From 1840 her owners were Worsall and Co., London.

| Year | Master | Owner | Trade | Source |
|---|---|---|---|---|
| 1835 | Wilkinson | Irving | London–Siam | LR |
| 1840 | Worsall | Worsall & Co. | London–Australia | LR; small repairs 1836 & damages repaired 1838 |
| 1845 | Worsall | Worsall & Co. | London | LR; thorough repair 1844 |

Loss: Lord Eldon was anchored off Madras when a gale on 17 December 1844 caused her to part from her anchors. Her crew attempted to run her onshore. She grounded and the waves pushed her on her side. The surf prevented her crew from launching her boats, or rescue attempts from onshore. Still, all but three of her crew saved themselves by coming ashore on pieces of the wreck. Lord Eldon had a valuable cargo of wine on board, besides indigo and sugar to the amount of 80,000 rupees.
