= Battle of Callantsoog =

Battle of the Anglo-Russian invasion of Holland

- Part of the Anglo-Russian invasion of Holland
- 1803 engraving of the battle
Date	27 August 1799
Location	Callantsoog, Batavian Republic 52.8500°N 4.6975°E
Result	British victory

Belligerents
Great Britain	Batavian Republic

Commanders and leaders
Ralph Abercromby; James Pulteney; Adam Duncan	Herman Willem Daendels

Units involved
North Sea Fleet (landing)	

Strength
12,000	10,000

Casualties and losses
74 killed 376 wounded	137 killed 950 wounded 20 missing
- Location within Europe

The Battle of Callantsoog (also known as the Battle of Groote Keeten) (27 August 1799) was an amphibious landing by a British invasion force under Lieutenant-General Sir Ralph Abercromby and Admiral Lord Adam Duncan near Callantsoog during the Anglo-Russian invasion of Holland in 1799. Despite strong opposition by troops of the Batavian Republic under Lieutenant-General Herman Willem Daendels, the British established a bridgehead and the Batavians were forced to retreat.

Regardless of stormy weather, a shortage of supplies and fresh water, and exhaustion from the voyage, the British soldiers successfully accomplished their mission at Callantsoog. The landing site was effectively chosen by Abercromby and Duncan, as they carefully accounted for the local topography and at the same time the enemy's disposition. Regarding Daendels' initial situation, the 10,000 Batavian soldiers were widely dispersed along the coast and therefore lacked sufficient forces to defend the battlefield. By the time Daendels had concentrated enough troops, it was too late: the local sand dunes (high ground), where the British infantry- and artillerymen had already entrenched themselves, prevented the Batavians from using their own cavalry and artillery.

== Background ==
The British government had long deliberated about the best place for the landing of the Anglo-Russian expedition on the Dutch coast. Possible locations taken into consideration were the Scheldt estuary (where the Walcheren Campaign was aimed in 1809) and the area around Scheveningen (near The Hague) where the planners expected support from partisans of the former stadtholder, William V, Prince of Orange. It was eventually decided, however, to select the extreme northern part of the North Holland peninsula, because its shore was more easily accessible than other parts of the Dutch coast, which were encumbered with dangerous shoals and sandbanks; because it was only lightly defended, with only a few shore batteries at Den Helder; and because it offered the hope of capturing the northern squadron of the Batavian fleet, a most important strategic objective. Also, the British planners thought that the great city of Amsterdam could easily be approached and captured from this direction.

The project of the expedition was of course known to the Batavian and French governments and military commanders, but they were of necessity uncertain of the exact location of the landing. This compelled them to spread their forces thinly over a large area, from the Scheldt in the South to Groningen. One of the two divisions of the new Batavian army, under Daendels, was indeed positioned in North Holland. He had about 7,000 men in the northern part of the peninsula, around Alkmaar, while a reserve force under General Van Zuylen van Nijevelt was located at the narrowest part of the province of Holland, near Beverwijk. The second Batavian division, under Lieutenant-General Jean-Baptiste Dumonceau (who was a Belgian, later naturalized to Dutch nationality), was guarding the northern provinces, Friesland and Groningen, and therefore separated from the North-Holland peninsula by the Zuiderzee, which abutted its eastern shore. This implied that Dumonceau was several day marches away and could in the event not reach Daendels in time to support him. The same applied to the French forces under the command of General Guillaume Marie Anne Brune, the supreme commander of the Franco-Batavian forces in this theater of war.

As the arrival of the Russian troops that would eventually take part in the expedition was delayed, it was decided to wait no longer, but to embark Abercromby's division of about 12,000 men on 13 August. The division consisted of

- 1st Brigade under Major-general Francis D'Oyley, comprising the 3/1st Foot Guards and a composite battalion consisting of the grenadier companies from different Foot Guards regiment;
- 2nd Brigade under Major-general Harry Burrard, comprising the first battalions of the Coldstream Guards and 3rd Foot Guards;
- 3rd Brigade under Major-general Eyre Coote, comprising the 2nd Foot, 27th Foot, 29th Foot, 69th Foot and 85th Foot;
- 4th Brigade under Major-general John Moore, comprising the 2/1st Foot, 25th Foot, 49th Foot, 79th Foot and 92nd Foot;
- Reserve Brigade under Colonel Macdonald comprising the 23rd Foot, 55th Foot and two squadrons of the 18th Light Dragoons.

The division was accompanied by companies from the 3rd and 4th battalions Royal Artillery (Lt.Col. Whitwhorth) and Royal Engineers (Lt.Col. Hay). Second-in-command and Chief-of-Staff was Lieutenant-General Sir James Pulteney. The invasion fleet of about 200 vessels in total was commanded by Vice-Admiral Mitchell.

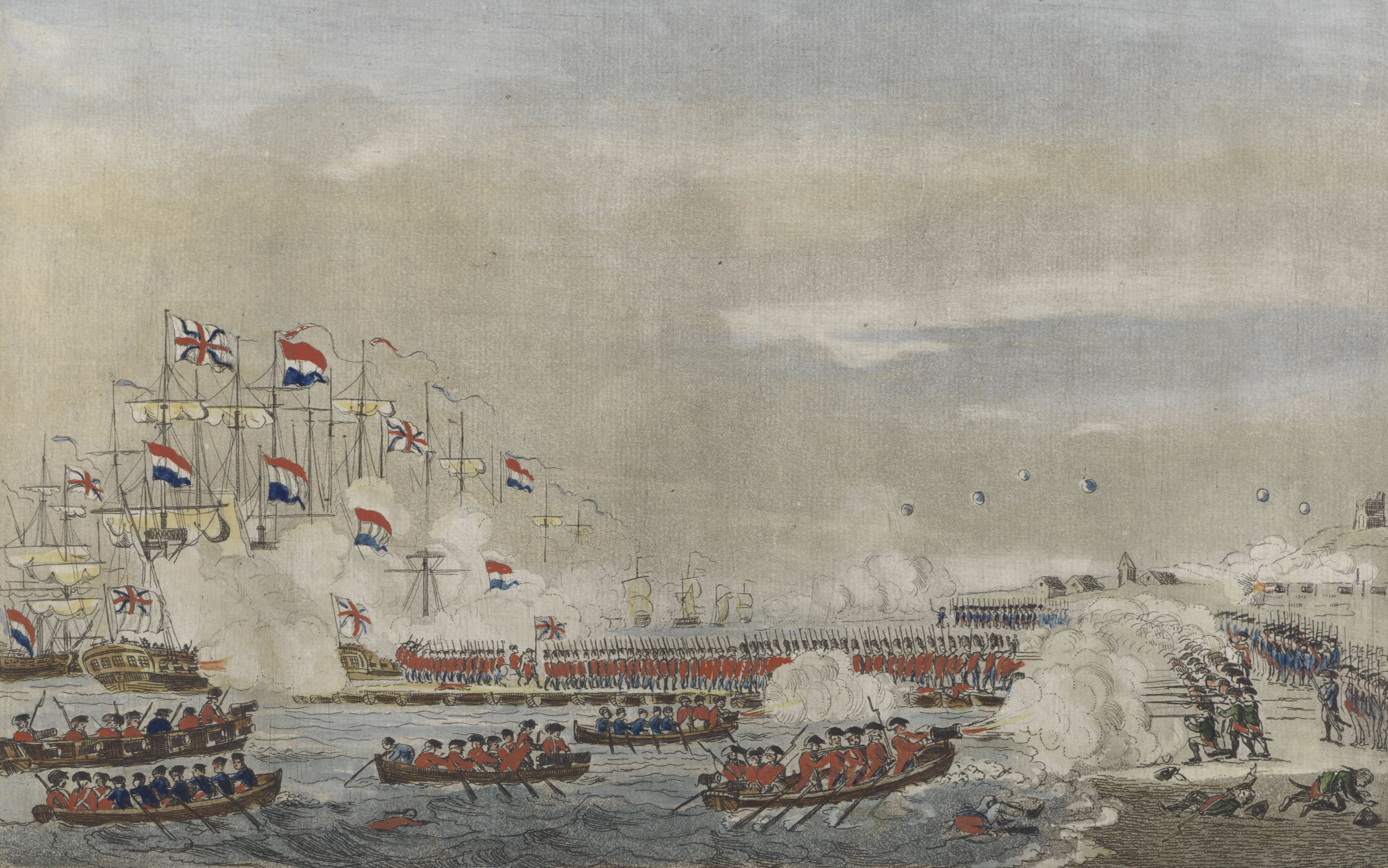
British troops landing at Callantsoog

Shortly after the departure of this fleet the weather turned stormy and the gale forced the invasion fleet to stand off of the Dutch coast until it finally calmed down, allowing the fleet to approach Den Helder on 22 August. By then, Admiral Duncan had joined the fleet. This Admiral then sent two parlimentaires to the Batavian Squadron of Rear-Admiral Samuel Story, that was anchored in the roadstead of Den Helder, to demand its surrender, and that of the shore batteries at Den Helder. Story indignantly rejected this demand. The next few days the British invasion fleet was again buffeted by inclement weather, but by the evening of 26 August this had sufficiently died down to consider starting the landing the next day.

Meanwhile, the Batavian forces had had time to make their preparations for the coming event. To understand these, it is useful to consider the terrain at the proposed landing site as it was in 1799, because the situation has considerably changed since then. Den Helder then was just a hamlet with two shore batteries (no more than sconces), called Unie and Revolutie, nearby. It was located at the extreme northern point of a spit of sand that jutted out from the North-Holland peninsula, north of Callantsoog. The spit consisted of three rows of dunes behind the North Sea beach, with a road (the Zanddijk), bordered by a canal, behind them. Behind the canal was a marsh, called the Koegras (that has since been embanked, but was then open to the sea and inundated at every high tide). The sand spit was bordered in the north by the Marsdiep and to the east by the Wadden Sea. It was no more than half a mile wide. Daendels figured that it would be impossible to sufficiently deploy his division in such a narrow space while fronting the shore. Instead he proposed to have only light forces of skirmishers (Dutch: Jagers) in the dunes along the likely disembarkation front, but to attack a landing from both the north and the south in a double flank attack, as soon as they had landed. He therefore positioned the 5th and 7th Demi-brigades of the Batavian army under Major-General Van Guericke in Den Helder, together with the 2nd Jagers and several squadrons of light cavalry and horse artillery (about 5,000 men in total). He himself took up position near Callantsoog with the remainder of the 1st Batavian Division, under Major-General Van Zuylen van Nijevelt. This command consisted of the 1st, 3rd, 4th and 6th Demi-brigades, the 1st Jagers and the 1st Grenadiers (about 5,200 men in total). Of course, the implication was that he violated the taboo against dividing his forces, but it seemed the best solution in the circumstances.

== Battle ==
At 3 a.m. on the morning of 23 August the British vanguard under Gen. Pulteney embarked in the boats of the British invasion fleet. There were not enough boats to accommodate all troops at once, so the landing had to be performed in stages. These 2,500 men of the 3rd Brigade and Reserve landed without mishap; the first to put foot ashore was Lt. Macdonald of the Grenadier company of the 25th. The fleet had meanwhile swept the beach clear with a vigorous cannonade that displaced a lot of sand, but did no damage to the defenders as those were positioned behind the first row of dunes. The British had landed at the location that was locally known as Kleine Keeten (after a cluster of sheds, Dutch: Keten; further to the south existed a similar cluster, known as Groote Keeten). On top of the dune near this location stood a semaphore station (Dutch: Telegraaf), which, as the nearest "strategic object", was immediately attacked by the British.

The Batavian jagers tried to prevent its capture but were driven back on Kleine Keeten, as had been anticipated since they were just a skirmishing line. However, the inexperienced Line battalion that stood in reserve at this location, instead of letting the jagers into their line in an orderly fashion, panicked and were routed; their commander, Lt.Col. Luck, died in action during this melee. Another Batavian battalion, the 2nd of the 5th Demi-brigade counter-attacked with the bayonet, but the British numerical superiority was too great and this battalion was also driven back, again with the loss of its commander, Lt.Col. Herbig. Gen. Guericke then decided to intervene on his own initiative and marched south from his command on the Batavian right wing with the 2nd battalion of the 7th Demi-brigade (2/VII) and two squadrons of cavalry and horse artillery, on the way rallying the 2/5th. Unfortunately, he deployed in the swamp area of the Koegras, behind the canal bordering the Zanddijk. This effectively cut him off from communications with not only his own command, but also the divisional command on the Batavian right wing. As a consequence, not only was his intervention ineffective (the canal was too much of an obstacle to attack the British around the semaphore), but also the remainder of the 7th Demi-brigade under Col. Gilquin (that was supposed to attack the British left flank) remained motionless during the entire battle for lack of orders to proceed.

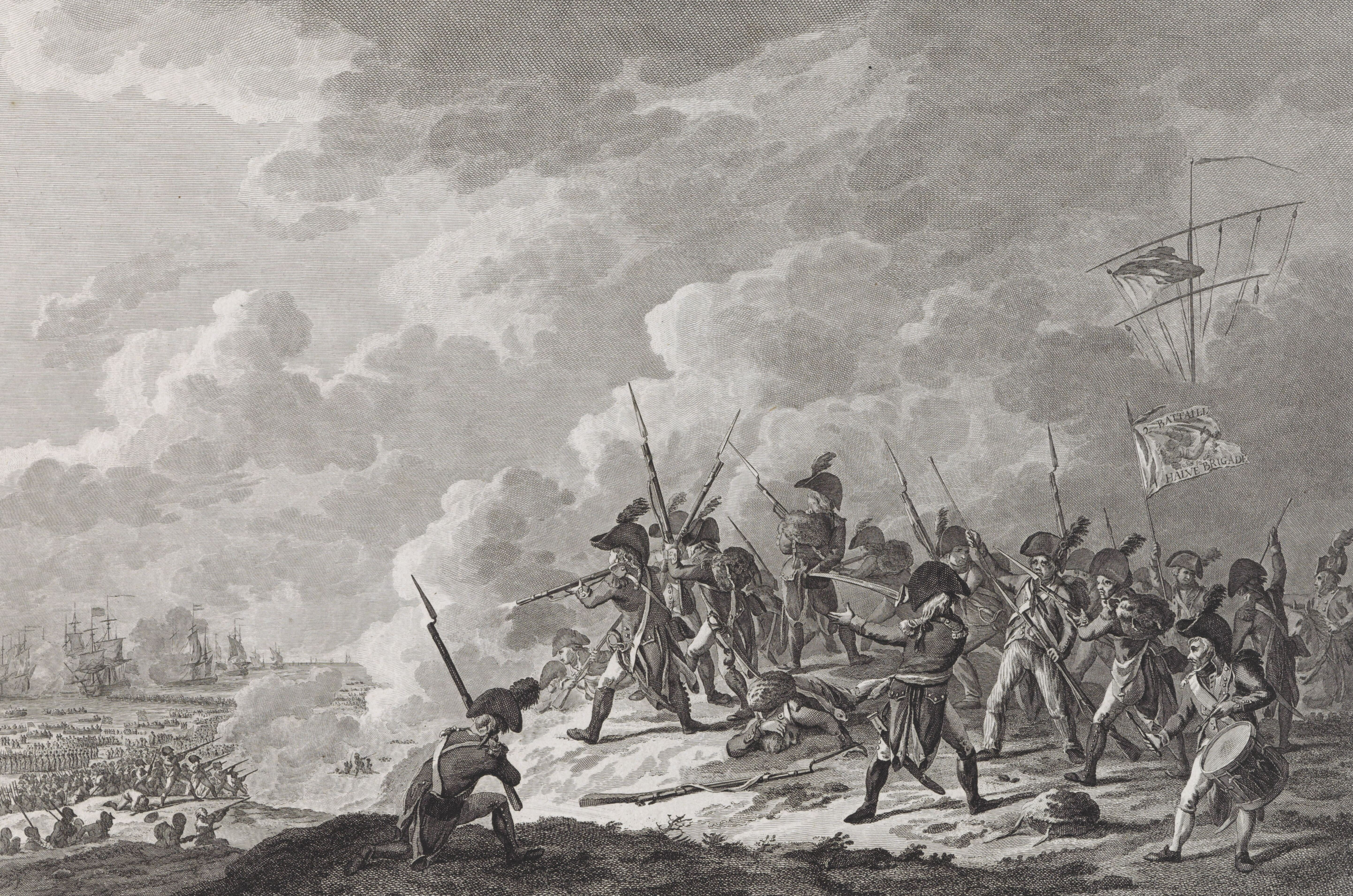
Batavian troops firing at advancing British soldiers during the battle

All Batavian activity during the main phase of the battle was therefore on the British right flank, by the Batavian left wing. Here Daendels deployed his forces in three lines, as the front was too narrow to deploy more than two battalions in line at a time. He first had Col. Crass attack with the 1st and 3rd battalions of the 5th Demi-brigade, supported by cavalry and two pieces of horse artillery under Capt. d'Anguerand. He was opposed by the British 3rd Brigade (now under command of Gen. Coote, as Gen. Pulteney had received a wound in the arm and been forced to leave the field). The British had only enough room to deploy one battalion in line and there was a threat that they would be outflanked near Groote Keeten, where the main action was fought. However, the Batavians were severely hampered by the terrain. The horses sometimes sank to their bellies into the dune sand and the artillery was constantly immobilized by the loose sand. Besides, the British gunboats were able to get very close to the beach and supported the British infantry vigorously, whenever they got sight of the enemy though gaps in the dunes. This British naval gunfire wrought havoc on the Batavian troops.

While Col. Crass's troops were mauled by the British and slowly being driven back, Daendels piecemeal fed reinforcements into the battle. Elements of the 1st, 3rd and 6th Demi-brigades were so used up without much positive effect. Meanwhile, the British disembarkation progressed almost without mishap; only one boat overturned, though with the loss of its crew of 20 drowned. The British numerical superiority on their right wing kept growing, while they were able to bring up field artillery through the loose sand, manhandled by British seamen. Around 6 p.m. Daendels saw the futility of further fighting and withdrew to his starting position; the British did not pursue. Daendels was joined there by Guericke with his detachment. This left only the troops of Col. Gilquin north of the British position near the batteries at Den Helder. Daendels decided to withdraw these troops also, as they were too few in number to withstand an assault by the far-superior British forces. Besides, the Helder batteries of course had their guns trained to seaward, and they therefore could not defend against an attack from the land side. (In the opinion of Admiral Story, they would have been unable to prevent an advance of the British fleet through the Marsdiep, anyway.) After spiking the 86 guns in the batteries, these Batavian troops left Den Helder by a roundabout route through the Koegras and arrived safely at the Batavian main force.

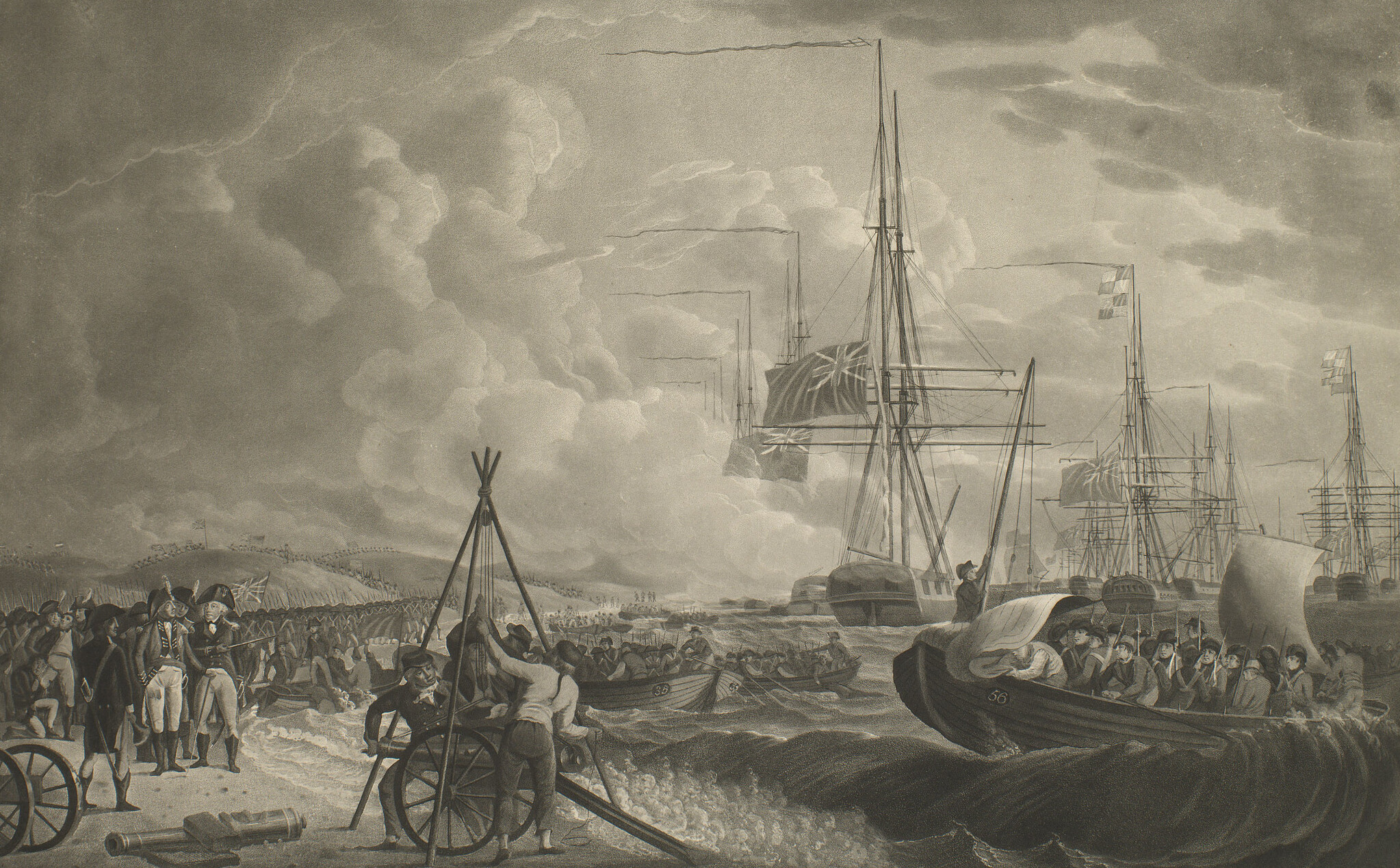
Abercromby, Adam Duncan and Andrew Mitchell landing at Callantsoog after the battle's conclusion

The consequence was that the roadstead of Nieuwediep fell into British hands without a fight, providing the British and Russian invasion forces in later phases of the invasion with a more convenient disembarkation location. Also, a number of inactive Batavian ships of the line were an easy prey for the British, as were the contents of the naval arsenal in Den Helder. The squadron of Admiral Story was forced to move away to the roadstead of De Vlieter further east. The British losses during the battle were 74 killed (including the 20 men that drowned), 376 wounded, and 20 missing. Among the dead were only three officers, but two of them were field officers: Lt.Cols. Hay, RE, and Smollett, 1st Foot. The Batavian army suffered 137 killed and 950 wounded.

== Aftermath ==
On the night of the battle, Daendels fell back on the nearby Zijpe polder where he occupied a defensive line. In the next few days he withdrew even further south, as he feared another amphibious landing near Petten in his rear, that would have placed him between two British forces. Such a landing would have exposed Alkmaar and points South to an easy British advance, too. At first he seems to have considered retreating all the way to the line Purmerend-Monnikendam, but in the event he took up a defensive position in the Schermer polder near Alkmaar. Later historians have held this retreat against him (as they did the abandonment of the "fortress" of Den Helder). General Krayenhoff points out, however, that the abandonment of Den Helder, though deplorable in its effects, was probably unavoidable. The formidable fortress of Kijkduin, that Napoleon Bonaparte had built after 1810, and that was so tenaciously defended against Dutch forces by Admiral Carel Hendrik Ver Huell in 1814, did not exist as yet. Daendels's abandonment of the Zijpe seems more questionable, but only because the British in the event did not perform the obvious landing at Petten, of which they should have been fully capable. An important consideration was also, that the Batavians had exhausted their ammunition during the battle. They were for the moment unable to engage in a new battle for that reason.

While Daendels arrived in his new position near Alkmaar on 30 August, dramatic developments took place on the Batavian fleet. The crews and some officers mutinied during the notorious Vlieter Incident of that day, and the squadron of Admiral Story ignominiously surrendered to Admiral Mitchell without firing a shot.

== Sources ==
- Krayenhoff, C.R.T. (1832). Geschiedkundige Beschouwing van den Oorlog op het grondgebied der Bataafsche Republiek in 1799 (in Dutch). J.C. Vieweg.
- Milyutin, Dmitry (1853). История войны России с Францией в царствование Императора Павла I в 1799 году [The history of Russia's war with France during the reign of Emperor Paul I in 1799] (in Russian). Vol. 5. St. Petersburg: Типография штаба военно-учебных заведений.
- The campaign in Holland, 1799, by a subaltern. London: W. Mitchell. 1861.
