= Vlieter incident =

Dutch surrender during the War of the Second Coalition

- Part of the Anglo-Russian invasion of Holland
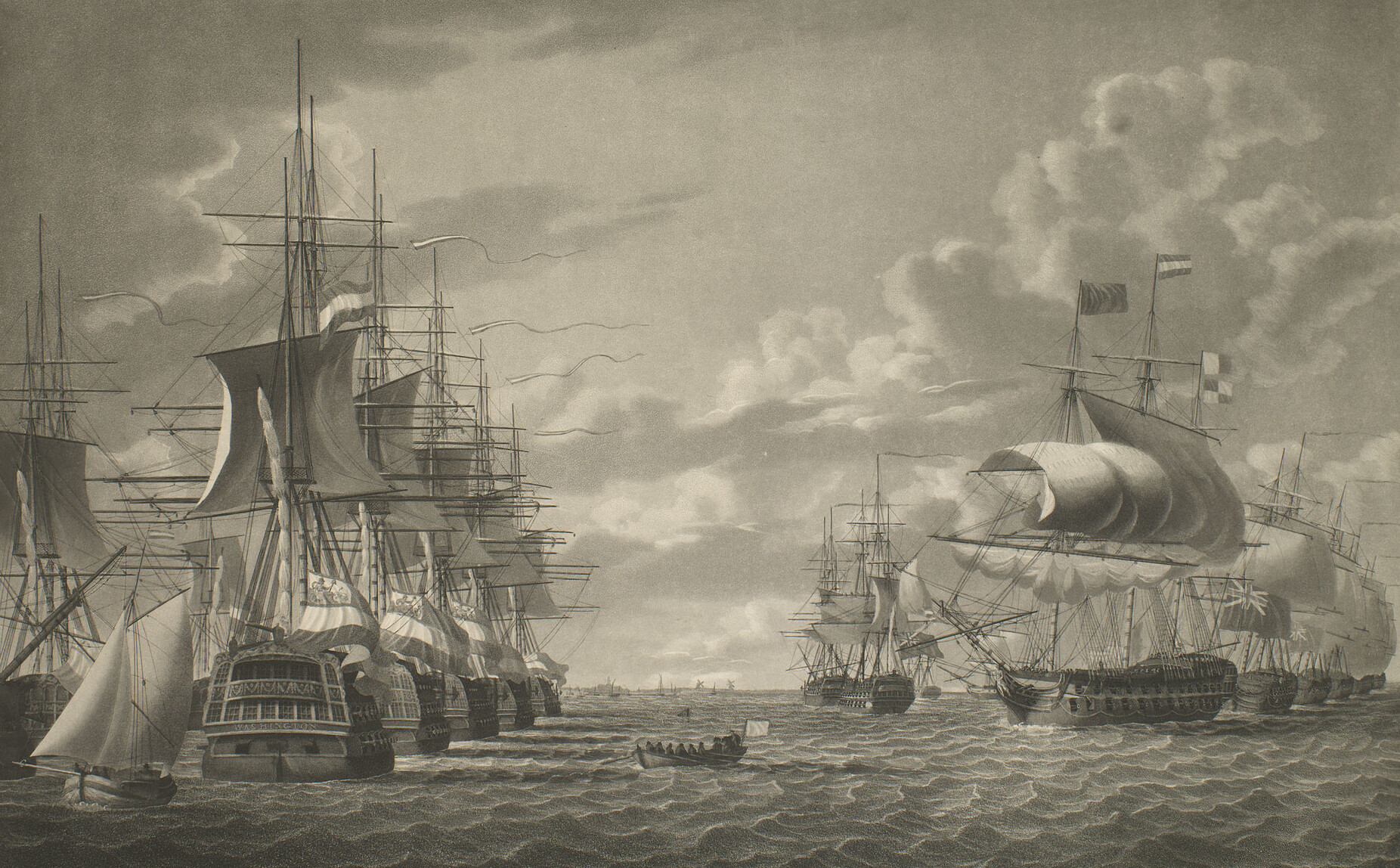
- 1800 engraving of the incident by Robert Dodd
Date	30 August 1799
Location	Off Wieringen, Zuiderzee 52.9000°N 4.9700°E
Result	British victory

Belligerents
Great Britain	Batavian Republic

Commanders and leaders
Andrew Mitchell	Samuel Story (surrendered)

Strength
17 ships	8 ships of the line 3 frigates 1 sloop

Casualties and losses
None	8 ships of the line captured 3 frigates captured 1 sloop captured
- Location within Netherlands

In the Vlieter incident of 30 August 1799 a Batavian Navy fleet under Schout-bij-nacht Samuel Story surrendered to the Royal Navy. The incident occurred during the Anglo-Russian invasion of Holland in the tidal trench between Texel and the mainland that was known as De Vlieter, near Wieringen.

== Background ==
During the War of the First Coalition, the Dutch Republic was invaded in 1794 by the armies of the French Republic, which led to the flight of Stadtholder William V, Prince of Orange, to England, and the proclamation of the Batavian Republic. The Dutch now changed sides in the war, entering into an offensive and defensive alliance with France.

In the course of the War of the Second Coalition, which actually was a continuation of the first war, without France, Great Britain, or the Batavian Republic having concluded a peace, Great Britain and Russia decided to launch an invasion of the Batavian Republic in the peninsula of North Holland in August 1799. It was hoped that this invasion would cause a popular uprising of the Dutch population against a French-imposed republic. The former Stadtholder and his eldest son the Hereditary Prince tried to support the expedition by propaganda efforts and intrigues with disaffected officers. The loyalty of the Batavian navy was especially in doubt, as this was a hotbed of Orangist sentiment. The British Major General George Don, who conducted a reconnaissance of the Republic in July, estimated that the Helder squadron of the Batavian fleet would fall into British hands without a fight, if the Allies played their cards right.

To accomplish this bloodless capture, the Allied fleet came stocked with the Prinsenvlag, pro-Orangist pamphlets, and Dutch émigrés, the most important of whom was the Hereditary Prince. One of the Orangist officers who had left the Navy in 1795, Carel Hendrik Ver Huell, had on behalf of the Prince contacted two of his former colleagues, Theodorus Frederik van Capellen and Aegidius van Braam (who had re-enlisted in the Batavian navy), with the object of getting them to organize a mutiny in the Helder squadron (where they each commanded a ship of the line). However, it is not clear whether the two officers indeed made a determined organizational effort before the fatal day.

The invasion fleet of about 200 warships and transports left England on 13 August. Inclement weather at first prevented it from approaching the Dutch coast. However, on 22 August, British Vice-admiral Andrew Mitchell was able to approach the roadstead of Den Helder where the squadron of Schout-bij-nacht Samuel Story lay at anchor. Mitchell sent over parlimentaires demanding that Story defect to the Prince with his fleet, but Story refused indignantly. He replied further that he would ask for further instructions from the Batavian government. The British ships then withdrew and the weather again turned bad for a few days.

On 26 August an Anglo-Russian invasion fleet of eleven ships-of-the-line and seven frigates arrived at the roadstead of Texel, flying the flag of the Prince of Orange. They started to disembark troops on the 27th, without opposition from the Batavian fleet, which had withdrawn into the Zuider Zee. General Herman Willem Daendels, the commander of the Batavian land forces, ordered the evacuation of the coastal forts of Den Helder after losing the Battle of Callantsoog.

== Mutiny and surrender ==
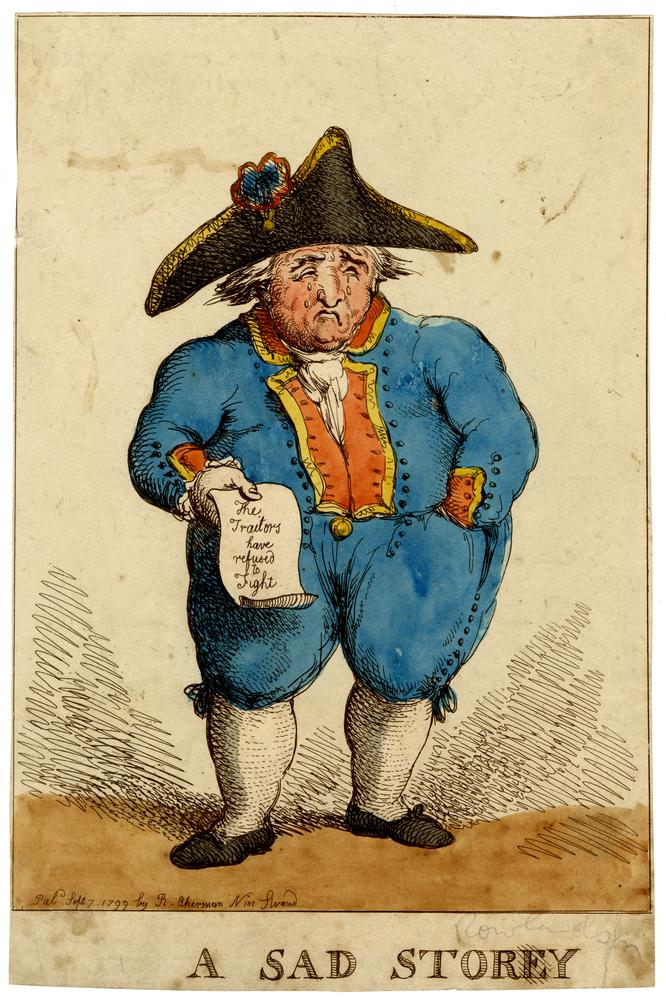
A sad Storey, a contemporary cartoon of Story weeping over the incident

On 28 August, Story returned with his squadron to the Vlieter roadstead. He was forced to anchor because of adverse winds that prevented the fleet from mounting a direct attack on Allied forces. Enervated by the sight of the Orange Prince's Flag on the forts and church steeples of Den Helder, several ships' crews began to mutiny. Among the ships whose crew rebelled was Van Braam's ship, the Leyden. He later admitted he could have easily suppressed the revolt aboard his ship, but that he decided against it. Instead, he informed his commanding officer, Story—who himself had to counter an incipient mutiny on the flagship Washington—of the "precarious situation" aboard the other ships of the fleet.

Story subsequently sent his flag captain, Van Capellen, and Cerberus' captain, Cornelius de Jong van Rodenburg, under a flag of truce to parlay with the commander of the British squadron, Andrew Mitchell. Van Capellen and De Jong were to instruct Mitchell that the Dutch fleet intended to give battle in accordance with explicit orders from the agent for the Navy of the Batavian Republic, Jacobus Spoors, but that Story had requested further orders and proposed to await those. Story requested a temporary truce to avoid unnecessary bloodshed. He would later go on to state that this had merely been a ruse to buy him some time—necessary to restore order back to the fleet.

Mitchell did not fall for this ruse, probably because the two Dutch negotiators were actually the mutiny's ringleaders. Mitchell issued an ultimatum of one hour for Story to surrender, or Mitchell's fleet would engage. Faced with this ultimatum, Story convened a council of war aboard his flagship with all his captains. According to Lieutenant Colonel Frederick Maitland, who was present at the discussions on board Washington as a British parliamentarian, Van Capellen, De Jong, and Van Braam did their best to influence the council in the direction of accepting the ultimatum. He later asked in a letter to General Dundas that "the opinions and sentiments expressed by the captains Van Capelle, Van Braam and the [sic] Jong generally in the presence of Admiral Story might not become public and those officers thereby endangered. To you in this letter, I apprehend I do right inform you, that above mentioned captains did declare their attachment to the Stadholder and the former government and their disgust at the present government and their French connections ..."

Before this council started, the crew of the Washington had already begun a full mutiny, refusing to man the guns, and throwing munitions into the sea. Attempts by Van Braam and by Story himself to reason with the mutineers had been of no avail. When asked during the council of war to describe the situation aboard their ships, all except Captain Van Senden of Batavier had similar stories. In these circumstances it seemed impossible to engage in battle. Besides, the officers calculated that putting to sea would do little to halt the invasion, as the disembarkation had already taken place. Scuttling the fleet seemed impossible, because the crews would not allow it. Finally, some calculated that it would be better to surrender without resistance, because in that case the ships would end up in the possession of the Stadtholder, instead of becoming war prizes for the Allied forces.

The council of war therefore unanimously decided to lower the flag of the Batavian Republic and declare themselves prisoners of war. They refused, however, to hoist the Orange flag. This may seem a minor point, but it signified that the officers did not defect. When Mitchell accepted the surrender, he did this in the name of the Prince of Orange. He therefore ordered the flag of the Prince to be hoisted, with which order some of the officers complied. This act was interpreted by many in Holland as an act of treason.

Meanwhile, in the absence of the captains, further acts of mutiny had taken place on the other ships. One officer was drowned; others were beaten up. The Batavian flag was torn up by the mutineers. British officers restored order with some difficulty. After their surrender, the Prince visited several of the ships to the encouragement of the mutineers. He had hoped to now take command of the surrendered fleet himself, yet his request was turned down by the British. The crews were disembarked and British prize crews sailed the ships to England. Only five derelict frigates lying off Den Helder were handed to William. These were manned with Orangist volunteer crews living in the vicinity. They sailed to England under jury rig in November. One of these frigates foundered with loss of life.

== Aftermath ==
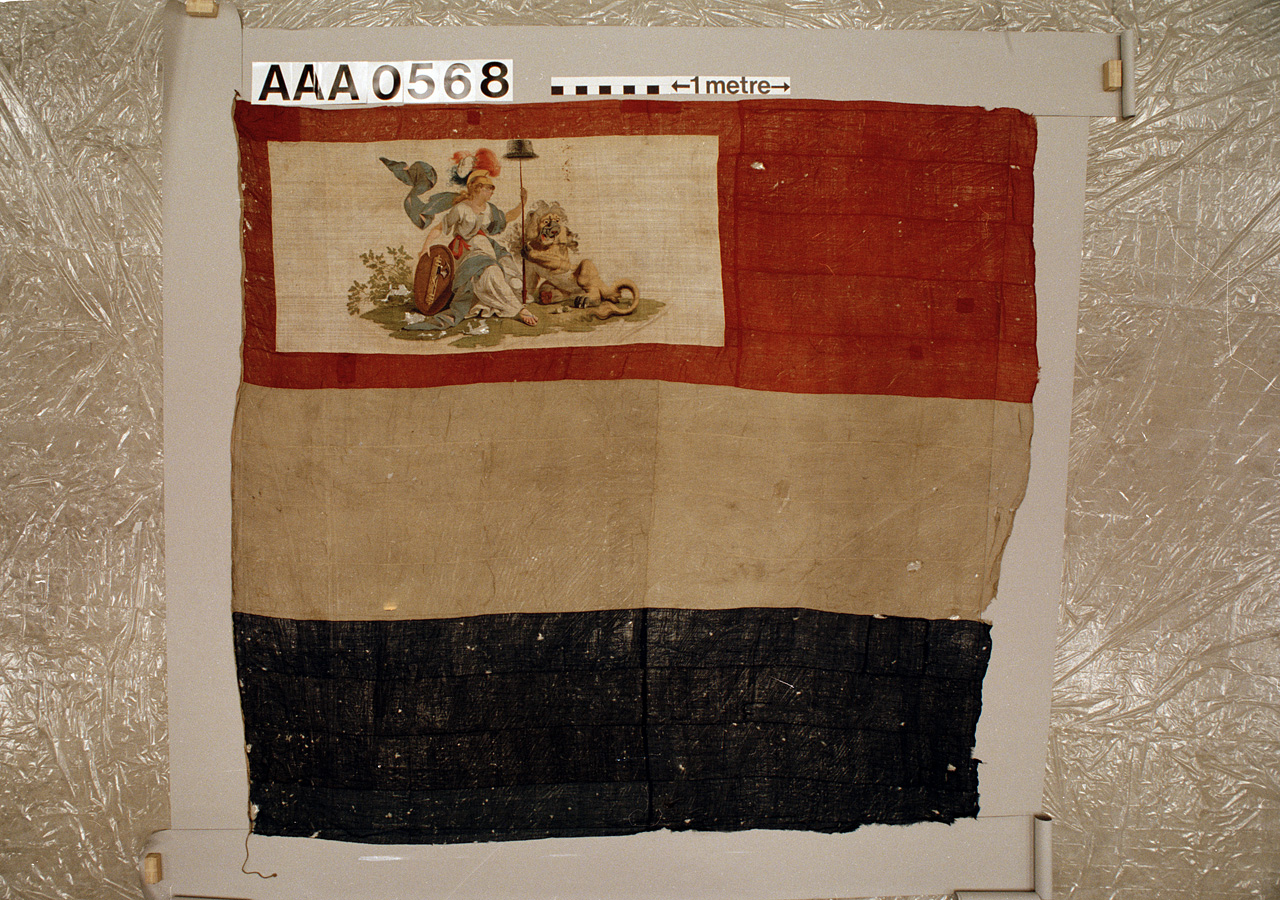
Ensign of a Batavian warship captured during the incident

After this initial success, the Anglo-Russian expedition soon ran into difficulties. The civilian population of North Holland did not display the fervour for the cause of Orange that the Prince had expected. The Batavian army proved remarkably resilient and managed in cooperation with the French army of occupation to deal the Allies defeats at the Battle of Bergen and Battle of Castricum. The Allies therefore evacuated North Holland at the end of October. As this was the second surrender of a Batavian fleet in short order (after the capitulation of Saldanha Bay in 1796), the authorities of the Batavian Republic decided to convene a court-martial on 8 October, to exact exemplary punishment of the officers responsible for the surrender, and of the mutineers. As these were away in England the trial had to wait until the first returned to the Netherlands on parole. Those were arrested. Only Story himself, Van Braam and Van Capellen remained outside the reach of the court. They were eventually tried in absentia.

One captain, N. Connio of the brig Gier, was condemned to death, and executed on board the guard ship Rozenburg on 27 December, to the consternation of the detained officers. Captain Dirk Hendrik Kolff of Utrecht was also condemned to death, but he managed to escape before his execution. De Jong was acquitted of the charge of treason, for lack of evidence, but he was convicted of dereliction of duty. He was cashiered; had to undergo a symbolic simulated execution (whereby a sword was swung over his head), and was banished for life. The trials were then suspended in the hope that the absent officers would become available. In July 1801 the trial was resumed with new indictments against officers who had surrendered ships on earlier occasions or been otherwise derelict. Several other officers were punished in an attempt to make clear to the officer corps that surrender without a fight was unacceptable.

In June 1802 the Hoge Zeekrijgsraad was replaced by a permanent court, the Hoge Militaire Vierschaar (High Military Court). This court eventually conducted the trials of Story, Van Capellen, Van Braam, and Kolff in absentia, after it had become clear that these officers would not return to the Netherlands after the Peace of Amiens in 1802, when they were released as POWs. They were convicted of dereliction of duty, cowardice, and disloyalty. The court declared them perjurious (because they had broken their oath of loyalty), without honour and "infamous"; they were cashiered, and banished for life on penalty of execution (by beheading in the case of Story; by death by firing squad in the case of the other three). Story moved to Germany. He protested his innocence to the very end, publishing a public defence in the form of a book. He died in Cleves in 1811, before he could ask the new King of the Netherlands for rehabilitation. The others were more fortunate in this respect. They were fully rehabilitated after the Orangist party was restored to power in 1814. Van Capellen became a vice-admiral in the new Royal Netherlands Navy, and commanded a squadron at the Bombardment of Algiers in 1816.

== Dutch ships surrendered ==
The squadron of Admiral Story comprised only part of the Batavian fleet. In Amsterdam lay four 74-gun and two 64-gun ships; at Hellevoetsluis one 74-gun ship and seven 64-guns, besides several frigates and brigs.

- Washington, a 74-gun ship of the line captained by Captain Theodorus van Capellen
- Cerberus, a 68-gun ship of the line captained by Captain De Jong van Rodenburgh
- Admiraal de Ruijter, a 68-gun ship of the line captained by Captain Huys
- Gelderland, a 68-gun ship of the line captained by Captain-Lieutenant Waldeck
- Leyden, a 68-gun ship of the line captained by Captain Aegidius van Braam
- Utrecht, a 68-gun ship of the line captained by Captain Dirk Hendrik Kolff
- Batavier, a 56-gun ship of the line captained by Captain van Senden
- Beschermer, a 64-gun ship of the line captained by Captain Eilbracht
- Mars, a 44-gun frigate captained by Captain Bock
- Amphitrite, a 40-gun frigate captained by Captain Schutter
- Embuscade, a 32-gun frigate captained by Captain Rivery
- Galathée, a 16-gun sloop captained by First Lieutenant Droop

== Bibliography ==
- Lambert, A. D. (2002). The Naval History of Great Britain: 1797–1799. Mechanicsburg: Stackpole. ISBN 9780811710053.
- Fehrman, C. N. (1969). Onze Vloot in de Franse Tijd (in Dutch). The Hague: Kruseman. OCLC 978224491.
- De Jonge, J. C. (1862). Geschiedenis van het Nederlandsche zeewezen (in Dutch). Haarlem: Kruseman. OCLC 830829213.
- Otridge, W. (1801). View of the History, Politics, and Literature for the Year 1799. London: T. Burton. pp. 86–90. OCLC 931192863.
- Roodhuyzen, T. (1998). In woelig vaarwater: marineofficieren in de jaren 1779–1802 (in Dutch). De Bataafsche Leeuw. ISBN 90-6707-477-2.
- Story, S. (1805). Verantwoording van Samuel Story, wegens zijn gehouden gedrag als commandant (in Dutch). Amsterdam: J. Allart. OCLC 825878860.
