= Theodorus Frederik van Capellen =

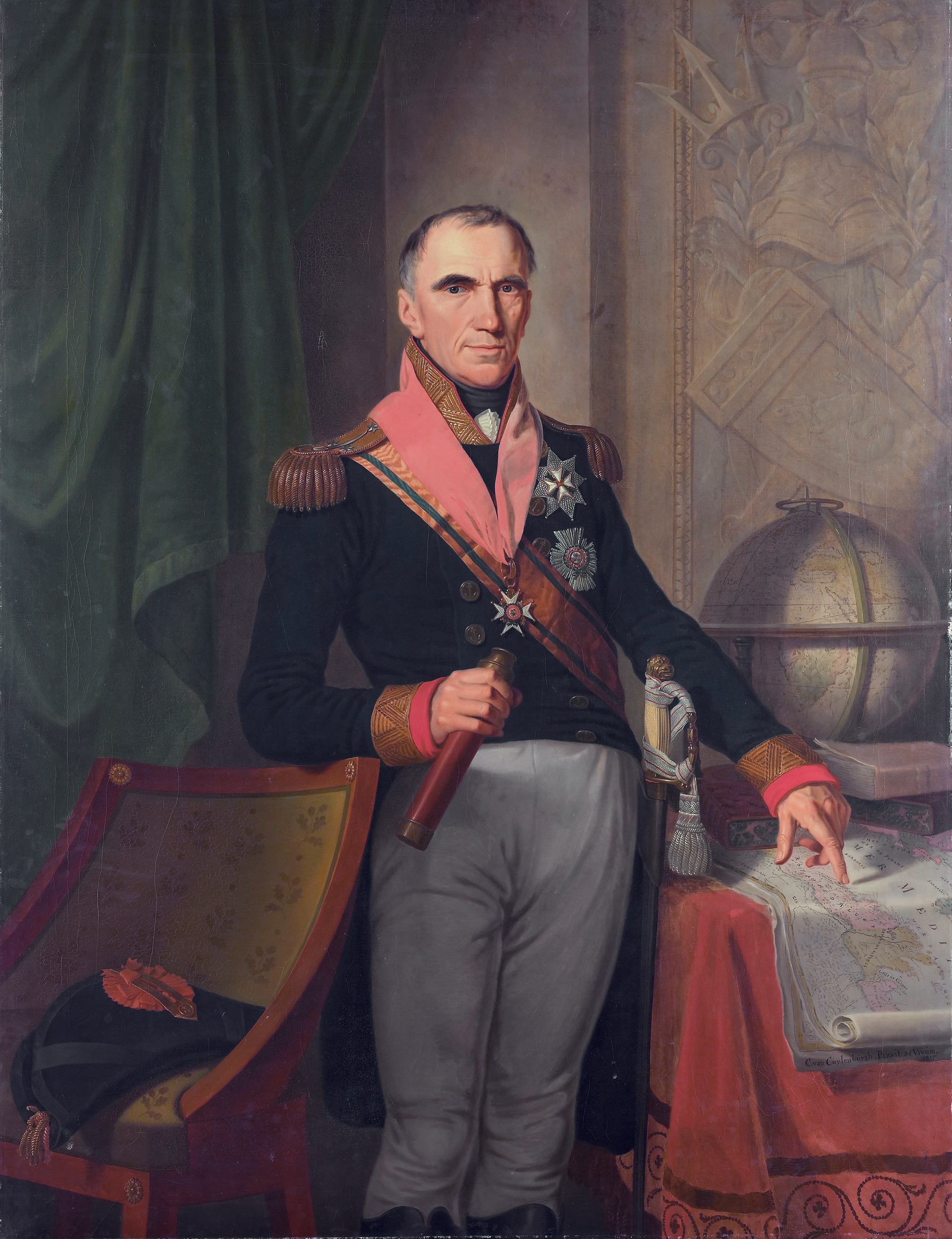
- Portrait by Cornelis van Cuylenburg, 1817
- Born: 6 September 1762; Nijmegen, Dutch Republic
- Died: 15 April 1824 (aged 61); Brussels, Netherlands
- Military career
- Allegiance: Dutch Republic; Batavian Republic; Kingdom of the Netherlands
- Branch: Dutch States Navy; Batavian Navy; Royal Netherlands Navy
- Service years: 1781–1818
- Rank: Vice admiral (Royal Netherlands Navy)
- Commands: Delft; Washington; Melampus
- Conflicts: Fourth Anglo-Dutch War; Action of 30 May 1781; War of the First Coalition; War of the Second Coalition; Anglo-Russian invasion of Holland; Vlieter incident; Bombardment of Algiers (1816)

Vice-Admiral Theodorus Frederik van Capellen, GCMWO, KCB (6 September 1762 – 15 April 1824) was a Dutch naval officer who served in the French Revolutionary and Napoleonic Wars.

== Life ==
Van Capellen entered service in 1781 in the Dutch States Navy. In the Fourth Anglo-Dutch War he distinguished himself at the action of 30 May 1781 between his ship Den Briel and HMS Crescent, and earned an early promotion to captain in 1783. In 1792 and 1793 he commanded a flotilla of gun boats in the defense of the Hollands Diep. On 31 May 1793 he received command of the 56-gun ship of the line Delft. As such he freed 75 Dutch slaves in Algiers during the expedition of Schout-bij-nacht Pieter Melvill van Carnbee. After the Batavian Republic was founded in 1795, van Capellen, an adherent of Stadtholder William V, Prince of Orange, resigned his commission. However, after William gave permission to former States Navy officers to enlist in the Batavian Navy, he obtained a commission in it. In 1798, he received the command of the new 74-gun Washington.

Van Capellen and Aegidius van Braam, captain of Leyden, were approached by an Orangist agent in the run-up to the Anglo-Russian invasion of Holland with a request to bring about the defection of the Batavian squadron at the Texel under Schout-bij-nacht Samuel Story, whose flag captain van Capellen then was. Though it is not known with certainty whether van Braam and van Capellen really made preparations to foment a mutiny, they did play a leading role in what became known as the Vlieter incident. In any case, van Capellen was sent by Story to British Vice-admiral Andrew Mitchell as a parlimentaire on 30 August 1799 to request a temporary ceasefire. He also played a leading role in the subsequent council of war aboard the Batavian flagship, during which Story was persuaded to surrender without a fight to the British. Afterward, van Capellen became a prisoner of war with the other officers and crews of the Batavian squadron until the Treaty of Amiens of 1802.

Meanwhile, the government of the Batavian Republic had convened a court-martial to try the officers deemed responsible for the surrender. Van Capellen was tried in absentia and convicted on 16 January 1804 (together with Story and two other officers) of dereliction of duty, cowardice, and disloyalty (though not of treason). He was cashiered from the navy and sentenced to banishment for life, on pain of death by firing squad. He remained in exile in England from 1799 until the re-emergence of the Dutch state in 1813.

In 1814 he was appointed as a vice admiral in the Royal Netherlands Navy by William I of the Netherlands (who also had played a leading role in the Vlieter Incident in 1799), and on 21 August 1815 was created a Jonkheer by the then new King of the Netherlands. The new navy sent a squadron to the Barbary Coast in 1816 to suppress the activities of the Barbary pirates. This squadron by itself was not powerful enough to make an impression on the Dey of Algiers. However, when a British squadron under Admiral Edward Pellew, 1st Viscount Exmouth arrived with the same mission, the two squadrons joined forces in the bombardment of Algiers of 27 August 1816.

Van Capellen received the Knight Grand Cross of the Military Order of William on 20 September 1816. He was made an honorary knight-commander of the Order of the Bath by the British government. Van Capellen retired from the Dutch navy in 1818. He then became the Lord Chamberlain of William II of the Netherlands, who then still was the Crown Prince.

== Sources ==
- James, J.M. (2002) The Naval History of Great Britain: During the French Revolutionary and Napoleonic Wars. Vol. 2 1797–1799, Stackpole Books, ISBN 0-8117-1005-X
- (in Dutch)Frederiks, J.G. (1893) "Een datum in het levensbericht van den Vice-Admiraal Jhr. T.F. van Capellen (1763–1824)", in Maandblad van het Genealogisch-Heraldiek Genootschap "De Nederlandsche Leeuw", XIe Jaargang, no. 10, p. 96
- (in Dutch) Jonge, J.C. de, and Jonge, J.K. de (1862) Geschiedenis van het Nederlandsche zeewezen, A.C. Kruseman
- Otridge, J., et al. (1817) "Dispatches from Queen Charlotte, Algiers Bay, August 28, 1816, by Lord Exmouth, C.G.B. addressed to John Wilson Croker, esq.", in The Annual Register, Or, A View of the History, Politics, and Literature for the Year 1816, pp. 230–238
- (in Dutch) Roodhuyzen, T. (1998) In woelig vaarwater: marineofficieren in de jaren 1779–1802, De Bataafsche Leeuw, ISBN 90-6707-477-2
