= Aegidius van Braam =

Dutch Navy admiral

- Coat of arms
- Born: 30 July 1758; Gorinchem
- Died: 17 May 1822 (aged 63); Delft
- Occupation: Naval officer
- Spouse(s): Aletta van der Sleijden, Sophie Thierens

Aegidius van Braam (30 July 1758 in Gorinchem – 17 May 1822 in Delft) was a Dutch naval officer who attained the rank of vice-admiral. When the Dutch Republic was overrun by French Revolutionary troops in 1795, he remained loyal to the House of Orange-Nassau and fled to England. Following the restoration in 1814, he was repatriated by King William I and received the hereditary noble title of jonkheer.

== Life ==
Aegidius van Braam was born in the town of Gorinchem to Everhardus van Braam (1763–1812) and his first wife Aletta van der Sleijden (1729–1767). He left for Amsterdam and in 1783 joined the Dutch fleet as an officer.

Van Braam lived in Delft for much of his life, in a chic mansion on the Oude Delft canal, on the corner with Nickersteeg alley (house number 73, now 36). On 12 March 1783, he wed Sophie Thierens (1767–1825). After his death, Van Braam was buried in a niche in the Nieuwe Kerk church in Delft.

His sons also became naval officers. The noble line of the Van Braam family, his descendants, died out in 1939, but through the acknowledged children of his grandson George Marinus van Braam (1852–1921) a non-noble branch continues to exist.

== Career ==
=== Patriotten era ===
In 1797, during the conflict between the Patriot faction and the stadtholder, William V, he served as lieutenant to Captain Tulleken of the cutter Salamander, which lay anchored off the island of Texel. Tulleken was arrested by the States of Holland on charges of remaining loyal to the stadholder, ignoring the orders of the States of Holland, and inciting his crew to rebellion. Van Braam protested against the arrest of his captain and demanded his release, upon which Van Braam was himself arrested and dismissed from the navy. After the restoration of the stadholder by Prussian troops later that year, Van Braam was restored to the navy and promoted to captain of the Argo, a warship carrying 36 cannon.

=== Vlieter incident ===
When the Batavian Revolution in 1795 swept away the old republic and replaced it with the revolutionary Batavian Republic, many Orangist officers resigned from the fleet, including Van Braam. He however re-enlisted in 1798. In 1799, Van Braam held command over the Leyden, a ship of the line carrying 64 guns. The ship was part of a squadron that was to escort a force of some 5,000 men under the command of General Daendels to Java. Another Orangist naval officer who had left the fleet in 1795, Carel Hendrik Ver Huell, contacted Van Braam and another captain, Theodorus Frederik van Capellen. Ver Huell proposed that they mount a mutiny on board the ships of the squadron. Around the same time, a British-Russian force invaded the North Holland peninsula (see further Anglo-Russian invasion of Holland).

The crews of the Batavian war ships could see that in the distance, orange flags were being raised on the forts and church steeples of allied-overrun Den Helder as a sign of loyalty to the House of Orange-Nassau. Mutiny broke out on a number of ships, including Van Braam's ship, the Leyden. Van Braam later admitted that he could have easily crushed the mutiny, but decided to do nothing. He did however notify his commanding officer, Rear Admiral Story, of the "dangerous situation" on board the other ships of the fleet.

Confronted with a British ultimatum on one hand and mutiny on his ship on the other, Story on 30 August 1799 surrendered his squadron to the British. Van Braam, Story, and other officers were taken back to England as British prisoners of war. Following the Peace of Amiens in 1802, they were set free. However, they did not return to Holland, and in 1803 they were convicted in absentia by a Dutch court-martial of dereliction of duty, cowardice and disloyalty. The Dutch court also convicted the officers of perjury (having broken their oath of loyalty). They were dishonourably dismissed and banned from Holland for life, on punishment of execution (in the case of Van Braam by a firing squad).

=== Restoration ===
In 1814, following the restoration of the House of Orange-Nassau and the coronation of William I as first king of the United Kingdom of the Netherlands, Van Braam and other surviving officers returned to Holland and were restored in rank and honour by William I. On 1 July 1814, Van Braam was promoted to the rank of vice-admiral, and on 8 July 1816 he was raised to the nobility as jonkheer. He also received the Military William Order (Knight Third Class), the Order of Charles III (Knight Grand Cross), and the Doggersbank Medal.

In 1815, he commanded a squadron which sailed from Vlissingen to Surinam. In 1817 he sailed with the frigate Frederika to the Mediterranean to assume command of Vice-Admiral Van de Capellen's squadron, which had taken part in the bombardment of Algiers a year earlier. Later, he likely held command over a squadron in the West Indies. In 1822, he ended his naval career, and died soon after.

== Sources ==
- A.J. van der Aa, Biografisch woordenboek der Nederlanden. Vol. 2 (Dutch)
- Genealogie familie van Braam (Dutch)
- M. van der Tas, Kwartierstaat van der Tas-Einthoven. Genealogische Vereniging Prometheus (Dutch, PDF)
- Roodhuyzen, T. (1998) In woelig vaarwater: marineofficieren in de jaren 1779-1802, De Bataafsche Leeuw, ISBN 90-6707-477-2 (Dutch)
