= Samuel Story =

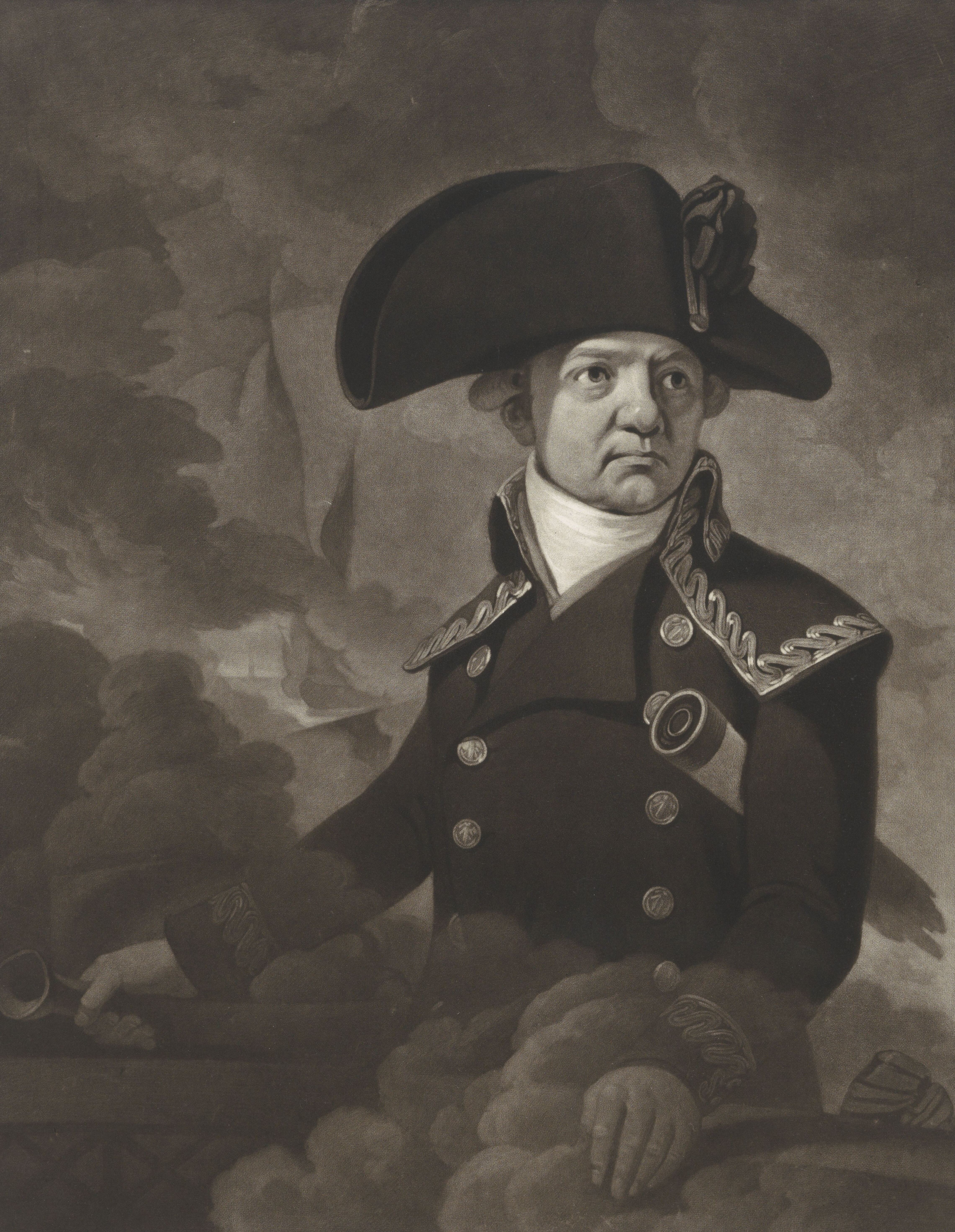
- Portrait of Story
- Born: 2 October 1752; Maasbommel, Guelders
- Died: 8 January 1811 (aged 58) Kleve, First French Empire
- Allegiance: Dutch Republic; Batavian Republic
- Branch: Dutch States Navy; Batavian Navy
- Service years: 1770–1804
- Rank: Schout-bij-nacht
- Conflicts: French Revolutionary Wars; Vlieter incident

Schout-bij-nacht Samuel Story (2 October 1752 – 8 January 1811) was a Dutch naval officer who served in the French Revolutionary Wars. He is best known for commanding the Batavian Navy squadron which surrendered without a fight to the Royal Navy during the Vlieter incident in 1799.

== Early life ==
Story was born in Maasbommel. He entered the Dutch States Navy in the Admiralty of Rotterdam in 1770. On 5 July 1774 he became a lieutenant on the 20-gun Orangezaal. His first command (in 1781) was the 36-gun frigate Jason. In 1793, he was appointed captain of the 40-gun frigate Pollux at Hellevoetsluis.

== Revolution of 1795 ==
In the severe winter of 1794–1795 the ships of the Dutch Navy at the roadstead of Hellevoetsluis became frozen in the ice on the Meuse river. Story's commanding officer, Rear Admiral Pieter Melvill van Carnbee, appointed him commander of the naval base and squadron. The armies of the French Republic had invaded the Netherlands in the course of the War of the First Coalition

They made easy progress. Commander-in-chief of the Dutch Navy, Lieutenant Admiral Jan Hendrik van Kinsbergen ordered Story to offer no resistance. On 3 January, he released and armed 600 French prisoners of war who had been incarcerated on his base. That way he secured the base for the Batavian Republic, proclaimed shortly afterwards.

In February 1795, the new government appointed Story to a commission charged with making an inventory of ships and naval installations accused of neglect by the previous government. The commission presented its report on 27 May, and concluded that the state of the Navy was deplorable. This was the basis for an ambitious programme of naval construction in 1796.

== Battle of Camperdown ==
The new fleet was first put to the test in the Battle of Camperdown of 1797. During this battle, Story commanded the Batavian frigate division as rear-admiral aboard the 74-gun ship-of-the-line Staaten Generaal. This ship caught fire, and while this was extinguished, it drifted to leeward, which made it impossible to rejoin the battle. This may have contributed to the decisive Dutch defeat.

In any case, the battle is remarkable because of the new tactics employed by Admiral Adam Duncan, which amounted to breaching the Dutch line, instead of sailing parallel to it (as were the usual tactics up to then). The point where the line was breached was just before Story's ship.

== Irish Rebellion ==
In 1798, the Batavian Republic was asked by its French ally to take part in the expedition to assist the Irish Rebellion of 1798. A Batavian squadron was formed near Texel under the command of Story. When the Dutch part of the expedition to Ireland was cancelled, this squadron was next re-targeted to the East Indies at the request of the Committee of East Indian Commerce of the Batavian government.

It was to escort an expeditionary force of 5,000 soldiers under the command of General Herman Willem Daendels who was to be in overall command. Story now attained the temporary rank of vice-admiral. However, strong rumours of a planned Anglo-Russian attack on the Republic in summer 1799 led to the cancellation of this expedition.

== Vlieter incident ==
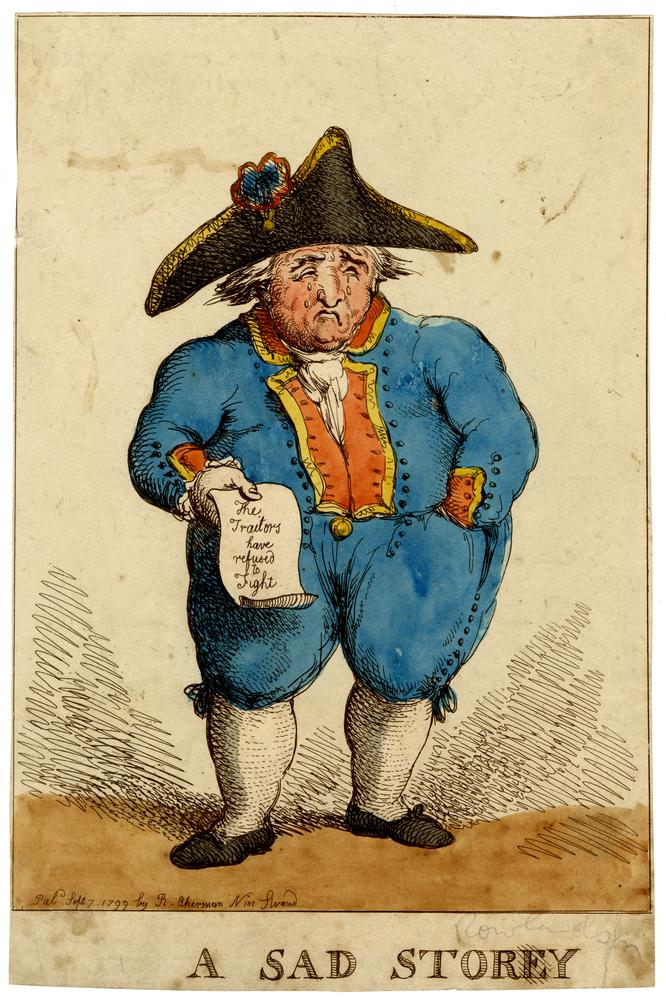
A sad Storey, a cartoon by Thomas Rowlandson mocking Story's surrender

When the Anglo-Russian expedition materialized in August 1799, Story still commanded the squadron at Texel, again as a rear-admiral. The machinations of a number of officers in his command with Orangist leanings led to the debacle of the Vlieter incident in which Story felt constrained to surrender without a fight to the Royal Navy squadron under Admiral Andrew Mitchell because of a mutiny aboard the Batavian squadron.

== Conviction and banishment ==
After this surrender, Story was made a prisoner of war until 1802, when the Treaty of Amiens was signed. The Batavian government had meanwhile tried him in absentia. He dared not return to the Republic because of this, instead trying to conduct his defence from abroad. He moved to Bremen in October 1802.

The Hoge Militaire Vierschaar ("High Military Court") convicted him on 16 January 1804, of dereliction of duty, cowardice, and disloyalty. He was declared to be "perjurious, without honor, and infamous," cashiered from the navy, and sentenced to banishment for life, on penalty of beheading. After this harsh sentence, he spent the rest of his life trying to be rehabilitated. In 1805, he published a defence in the form of a book that was part auto-biography.

He did not succeed, mainly because he died before the restoration of the leader of the Orangist faction, William I of the Netherlands to power. Other "mutineers", like Theodorus Frederik van Capellen were rehabilitated by the new king, but this was not extended to Story because he could not ask for rehabilitation.

Story died "of the impact of dropsy" in exile in Cleves on 8 January 1811.

== Bibliography ==
- "Heden zag ik de maat mijner wederspoeden vol gemeten". Rotterdamse Courant (in Dutch). 15 January 1811.
- Blok, P. J.; et al. (1912). History of the People of the Netherlands. New York: G. P. Putnam & Sons. pp. 330–331. OCLC 1721795.
- James, J. M. (2002). The Naval History of Great Britain. Vol. II. London: Conway Maritime Press. ISBN 9780811710053.
- De Jonge, J. C. (1862). Geschiedenis van het Nederlandsche zeewezen (in Dutch). Haarlem: Kruseman. OCLC 769847680.
- Story, S. (1805). Verantwoording van Samuel Story (in Dutch). Amsterdam: J. Allart. OCLC 63825117.
