= Parlimentaire =

Communicator with the enemy in war

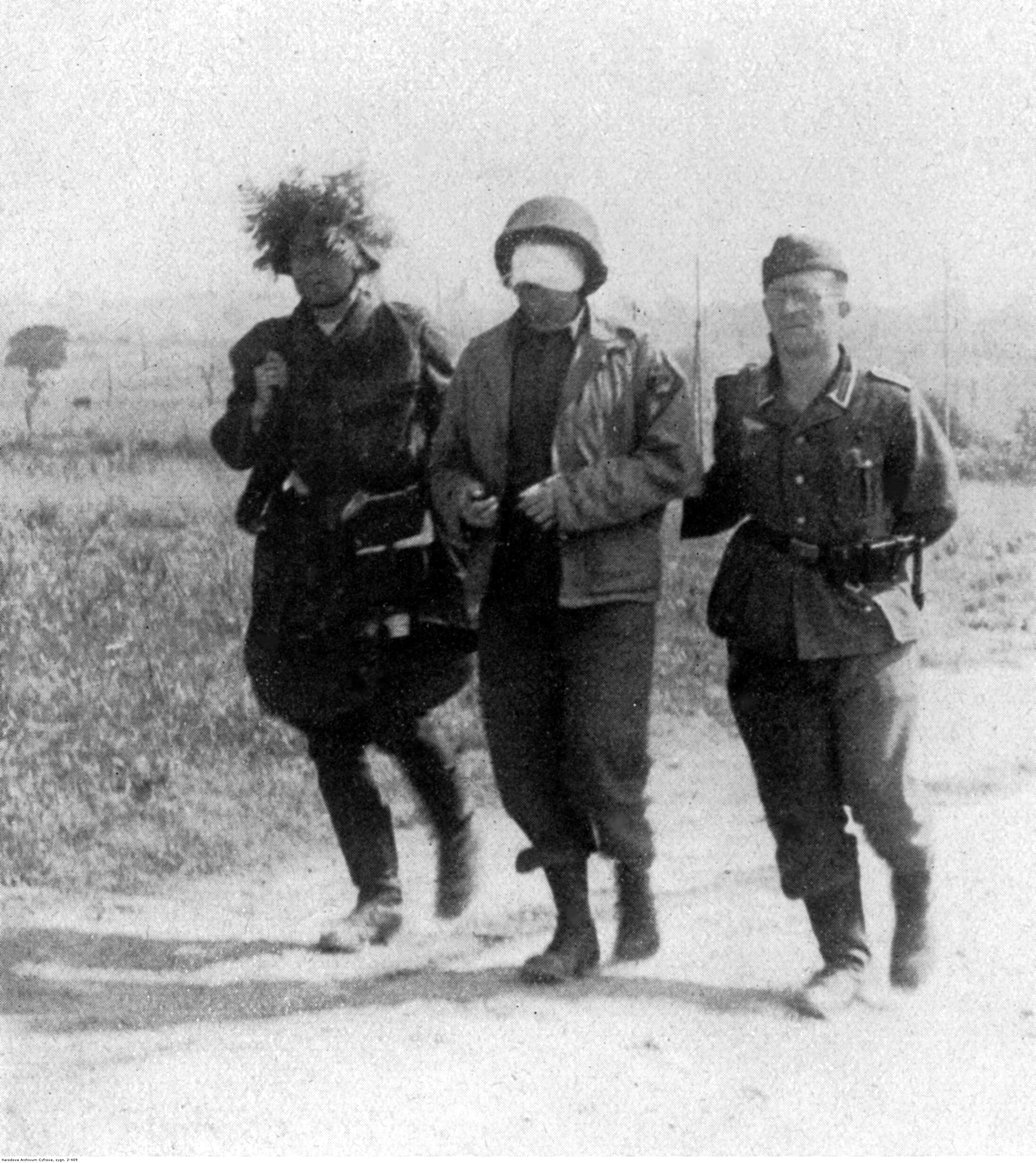
A blindfolded American parlimentaire led by two German soldiers (November 1944)

A parlimentaire or parlementaire is defined by the U.S. Department of Defense as "an agent employed by a commander of belligerent forces in the field to go in person within the enemy lines for the purpose of communicating or negotiating openly and directly with the enemy commander".

== History ==
Even in war, the belligerents sometimes need to communicate, or negotiate. In the Middle Ages, heralds were used to deliver declarations of war and ultimata as a form of one-sided communication. But for two-sided communication, agents were needed who could also negotiate. These usually operated under a flag of truce and enjoyed temporary inviolability according to the customs and laws of war. Breaches of the customary protection of parlimentaires were deemed perfidy.

== International law ==
Later, these customs and protections were codified in international law. Articles 32-34 of the Hague Conventions (1907) state:

Article 32
An individual is considered a parlementaire who is authorized by one of the belligerents to enter into communication with the other, and who carries a white flag. He has a right to inviolability, as well as the trumpeter, bugler, or drummer, the flag-bearer, and the interpreter who may accompany him.

Article 33
The Chief to whom a flag of truce is sent is not obliged to receive it in all circumstances.
He can take all steps necessary to prevent the envoy taking advantage of his mission to obtain information.
In case of abuse, he has the right to detain the envoy temporarily.

Article 34
The envoy loses his rights of inviolability if it is proved beyond doubt that he has taken advantage of his privileged position to provoke or commit an act of treachery.

Contraventions of these articles constitute war crimes that may be prosecuted before the International Criminal Court.

== See also ==
- Parley
