= Andrew Mitchell (Royal Navy officer) =

Royal Navy officer (1757–1806)

Admiral Sir Andrew Mitchell KB
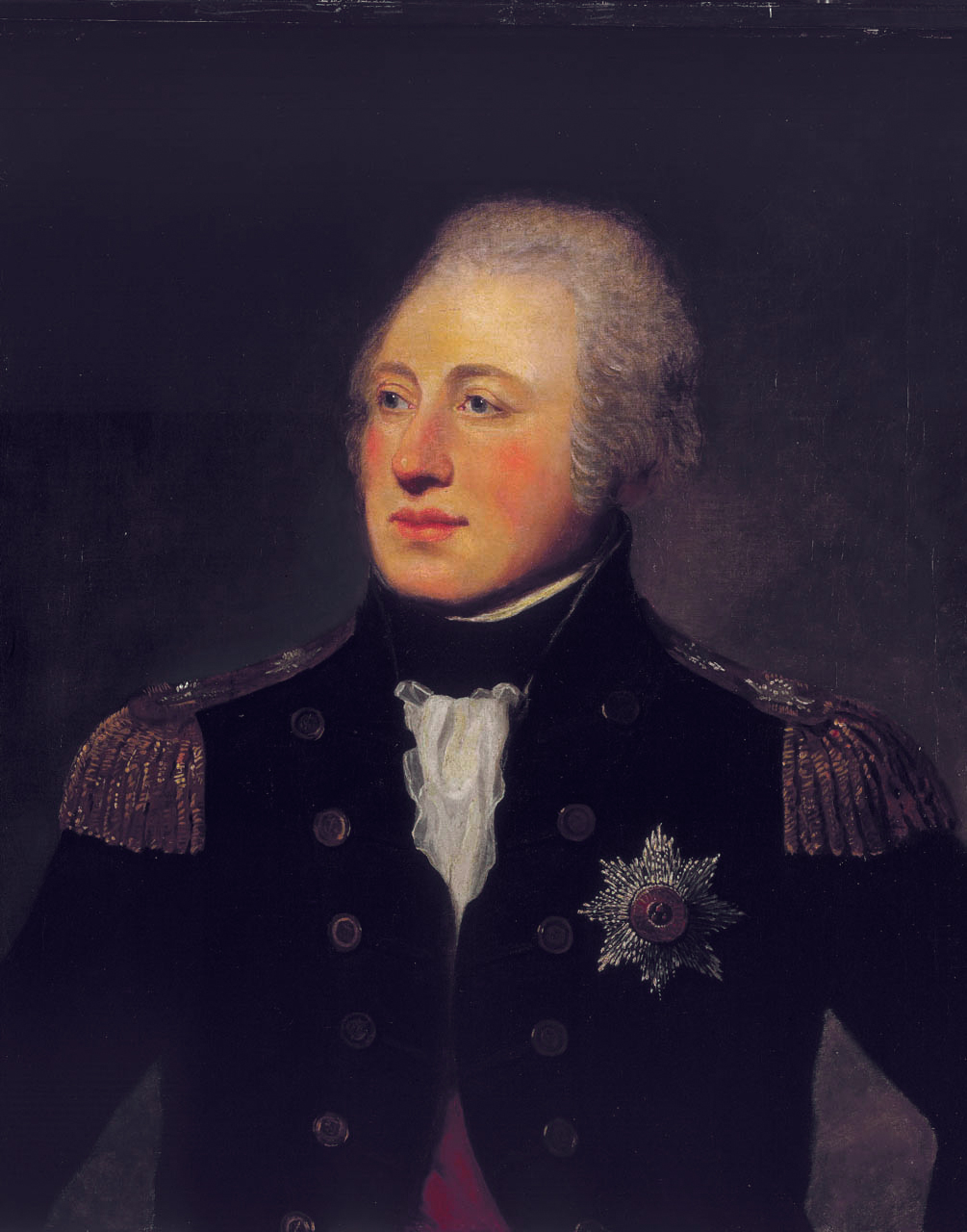
- Portrait by Lemuel Francis Abbott, c. 1795–1803
- Born: 1757; Dunfermline, Scotland
- Died: 26 February 1806 (aged 48–49); Bermuda
- Military career
- Allegiance: Great Britain; United Kingdom
- Branch: Royal Navy
- Service years: 1771–1806
- Rank: Admiral of the Blue
- Unit: HMS Coventry
- Commands: North American Station; East Indies Station
- Conflicts: American War of Independence; French Revolutionary Wars; Anglo-Russian invasion of Holland; Vlieter incident
- Awards: Knight Companion of the Order of the Bath

Admiral of the Blue Sir Andrew Mitchell, KB (1757 – 26 February 1806) was a Royal Navy officer who served in the French Revolutionary and Napoleonic Wars. He married Mary Uniacke (daughter of Richard John Uniacke) in Halifax, Nova Scotia on 3 May 1805.

== Career ==
Mitchell entered service in 1771 as a midshipman on HMS Deal Castle. He was promoted to lieutenant in 1776, while serving in the West Indies and again promoted to captain, skipping the rank of commander, after distinguishing himself in action in 1778. He distinguished himself again while serving with the 1782 expedition of Sir Edward Hughes in India. On 12 August 1782, Mitchell was captain of the frigate Coventry, when she encountered the French frigate Bellone off Dutch Ceylon. After two and a half hours, Bellone sailed away. Coventry had suffered 15 men killed and 29 wounded in the engagement.

When Hughes returned to England, he left Mitchell in charge of the East Indies Station as commodore. Mitchell returned to England in 1786. In February, 1795 he received command of a ship in the Channel fleet of Admiral Howe. In June, 1795 he was promoted Rear-Admiral of the Blue, and in 1799 to vice admiral and given the command of Sheerness. In August 1799, he participated in the Anglo-Russian invasion of Holland, during which Mitchell obtained the surrender of a Batavian Navy squadron in the Vlieter incident.

For his service in this expedition he was appointed Knight Companion of the Order of the Bath, with his own ribbon (no stall being vacant at this time) by George III in 1800. He was voted the thanks of Parliament, and the City of London presented him with a sword of honour at a value of 100 guineas. He was commander-in-chief of the North America and West Indies Station from 1802 to his death in 1806. His wife Mary died years later and was buried in the crypt of St. Paul's Church (Halifax, Nova Scotia). In 1805 he was raised to the rank of Admiral of the Blue. He died in Bermuda after a severe illness on 26 February 1806.

== Sources ==
Military offices
Preceded by Edward Hughes	Commander-in-Chief, East Indies Station; 1784–1785	Succeeded by Charles Hughes
Preceded by Sir William Parker	Commander-in-Chief, North American Station; 1802–1806	Succeeded by George Cranfield Berkeley
