= Admiral Lucas =

Admiral Lucas may refer to:

- Charles Davis Lucas (1834–1914), British Royal Navy rear admiral
- Engelbertus Lucas Jr. (1785–1870), Batavian Navy lieutenant admiral
- Engelbertus Lucas Sr. (c. 1747–1797), Batavian Navy rear admiral
- Robert S. Lucas (1930–2016), U.S. Coast Guard rear admiral
