= Engelbertus Lucas Sr. =

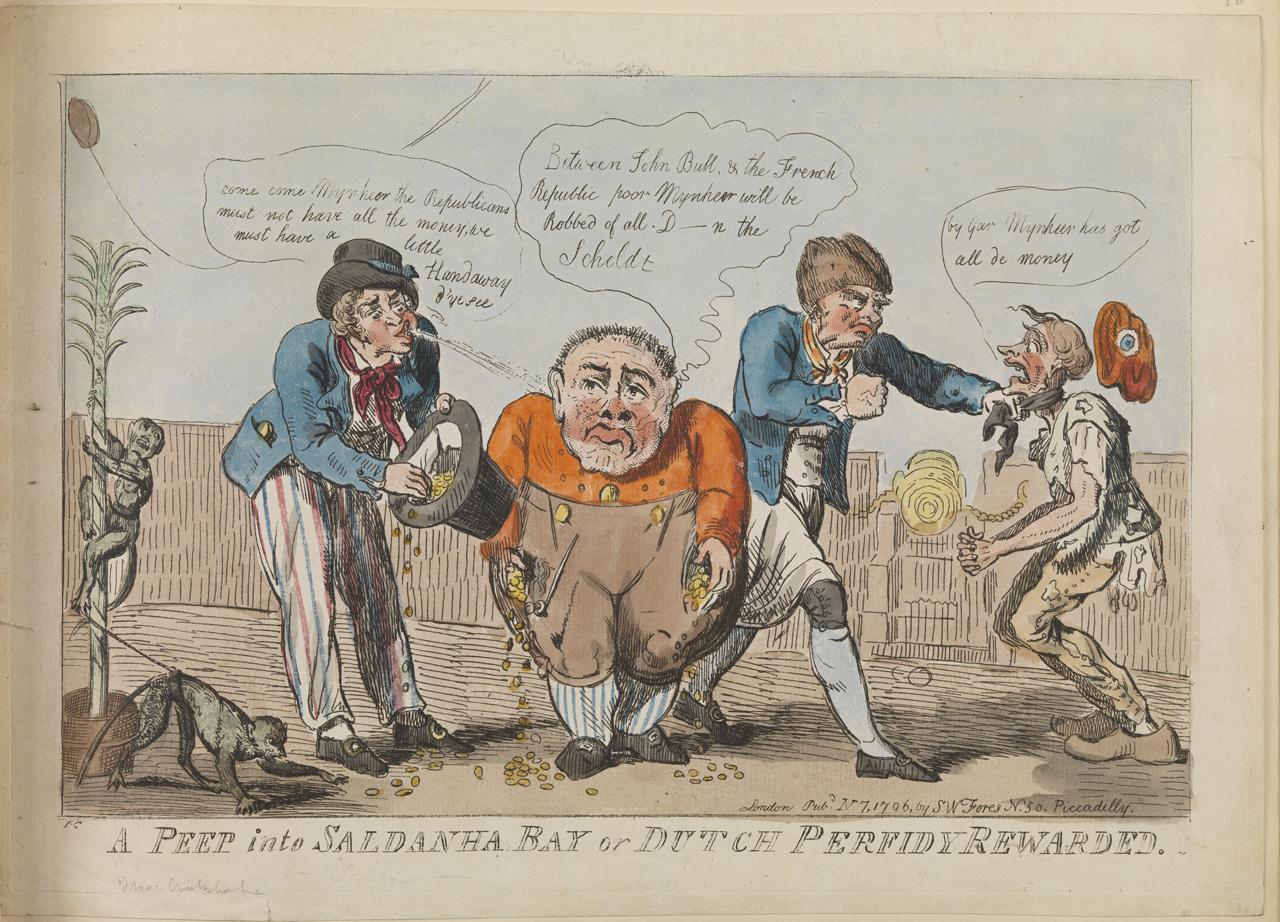
A caricature of Lucas (centre) by Isaac Cruikshank

Schout-bij-nacht Engelbertus Lucas Sr. (5 March 1747 – 21 June 1797 (Note: The date of death is often given as 26 June, but this must be a misunderstanding, as Jabob Spoors in his report to the Hoge Zeekrijgsraad relates that that court received notice from Lucas' widow on 23 June that her husband had passed away on 21 June. On 26 June the court decided to charge Spoors with writing his report; Spoors, report, pp. 1-2)) was a Dutch naval officer. On 17 August 1796 during the War of the First Coalition, he surrendered a Batavian Navy squadron under his command to the Royal Navy in the capitulation of Saldanha Bay.

== Personal life ==
Lucas was the son of Abraham Lucas and Elizabeth Bogaert. He was born before 5 March 1747, but baptized on that date. On 4 February 1774 he married Catharina Prins. They had two children, among whom their son, also named Engelbertus, born in 1785, who would become a lieutenant-admiral in the Royal Dutch Navy and Minister for the Dutch Navy from 1849 to 1851. His wife was a business woman in Schiedam who earned a good living as a distiller of Dutch gin. Her annual income in 1798 was 2,000 guilders according to a tax dispute, settled in 1801.

== Career ==
Lucas from early youth was employed on Dutch merchant ships, but was commissioned as a naval lieutenant by the Admiralty of Rotterdam of the Dutch Republic in 1772. Despite this navy commission he was employed as commodore of a fleet of private whalers, sent out to the Greenland waters by Thomas Pigeaud, a Rotterdam ship owner, from 1777 to 1780. In 1781 (during the Fourth Anglo-Dutch War) he received the same commission (though not rank) at the Admiralty. As such he made a final whaling voyage in 1784 for a Schiedam shipowner. On five voyages under his command the Dutch whalers caught a total of 35 whales.

On 20 August 1781, as master of the frigate Waakzaamheid, now Commander (cdr.) Lucas helped save the crew of the ship Embdens Welvaren that had foundered on the Maasvlakte, then a dangerous area of the sea before the Maas river estuary, for which he received an award in silver.

On 18 December 1785 cdr. Lucas, now in command of the frigate Scipio (20), left the Maas roadstead to take part in the expedition of Commodore Willem Silvester to the Dutch East Indies. He only joined Silvester's squadron at the Cape of Good Hope, however, completing the voyage to the Cape alone. Because of an accident with Silvester's ship of the line Holland at the Cape, which necessitated the reorganisation of the expedition, Lucas was again sent alone on Scipio to Ceylon, where he awaited the other ships. This shows that despite having no experience with the route to the East Indies, Lucas was an accomplished navigator.

After arrival at Batavia on 30 December 1786 the squadron was divided in two divisions, and the division that contained Scipio was sent on 4 February 1787 under captain Anastasius van Halm to the Moluccas, where it cruised and showed the flag for about eight months. After its return to Batavia the Dutch Indies government sent it to Malacca to reinforce the other division under Commodore Silvester, who was already lying there, in connection with a punitive expedition for the VOC against Riouw. Next Lucas, together with captain Abraham Kuvel of Valk, helped prevent a dangerous insurrection, in connection with a succession crisis in the sultanate of Solo in the latter part of 1788. The Scipio returned to the Netherlands in the Spring of 1789.

Because of this three-and-a-half-year absence from the Dutch Republic, Lucas missed the Patriot revolution of 1785 and its suppression in 1787, with its subsequent purge of the officer corps of the navy of Patriot sympathizers. This may have saved his commission, as he later became known as an ardent supporter of the Patriot cause, which helped advance his career after the Batavian Revolution of 1795. In February 1795 he was appointed by the States General of the Batavian Republic in a commission, chaired by Henricus Aeneae, to report on the state of the fleet. The commission soon reported that the state was dire, and that many ships needed extensive repairs to become operational again. The report formed the basis for an extensive program of naval construction in 1795–96.

=== Saldanha-Bay surrender ===
Subsequently, Lucas, now a kapitein ter zee (ktz) was given command of the ship of the line Dordrecht. This ship became, end of 1795, part of a squadron, further composed of the ships of the line Revolutie (ktz. Rynbende) and Tromp (cdr. Valkenburg), and the frigates Castor (cdr. Claris), Brave (cdr. Zoetemans), Sirene (cdr. de Cerf), Bellona (cdr. de Falck), Havik (cdr. Besemer), and the armed VOC ship Vrouwe Maria (lt. Barbier), that was destined for the Dutch East Indies. Lucas was given overall command of the squadron, apparently because he was the only senior officer available at the time (after many "old-navy officers hab been let go after the revolution) who had experience on a voyage to the Indies

The reason for fitting out this expedition was that on the one hand the Republic was about to nationalise the VOC, and to take over both the assets and the liabilities of the company (this was actually decided in December 1795, and would happen on 1 March 1796) which venerable institution was virtually bankrupt, while on the other hand rumors were circulating about the surrender of certain of the colonies of the VOC to the British as a consequence of the Kew Letters from the former stadtholder to the governors of the colonies, which rumors made the authorities fear the loss of those company assets. The States General therefore drew up a number of secret instructions for Lucas in November 1795, but because of the existing uncertainty about the situation (for instance, the capture of the Cape Colony was at that moment not known with certainty) these instructions had a highly contingent character. In this context the instruction concerning what to do in case the Cape had been taken over by the enemy, is most relevant for what later happened. In that case Lucas was explicitly prohibited from even landing anywhere in the Cape, but he should sail straightaway to the French colony of Isle de France (present-day Mauritius). The fact that the squadron did not have any infantry soldiers on board, with which to conduct a land campaign, makes this a quite reasonable command, as an opposed landing would have been impossible with the forces available. (Note: De Jonge denies emphatically that the squadron had 3,000 soldiers aboard, as some British historians appear to have asserted; de Jonge b, p. 279, note 2; One could reproach Lucas for accepting the command (as others seem to have refused it for just this reason) with such a weak force, and in a letter to the chairman of the Navy Committee, Pieter Paulus, he expressed skepticism about the reality of support from the French navy, which the Batavian authorities appear to have hoped for, but he was sent out with too few means to execute an ambitious task, like a reconquest of the Cape, anyway, which makes it even more likely that such an ambition was not really present in the given circumstances; de Jonge b., pp. 279-280) The fact that he in the event ignored this instruction was one of the main reasons why his conduct was eventually condemned. But in his defense, the fate of the Cape Colony had become known just before the squadron sailed in January 1796, so that it would have been possible to amend the instructions, to make them less ambiguous.

Another problem with which Lucas would have to deal (and which eventually contributed greatly to the failure of the expedition) was the unreliability of the crews of the ships, especially their non-commissioned officers, among whom adherence to the cause of the Orangist party (the supporters of the former stadtholder, who had fled to Great Britain in January 1795) was strong. The same goes for a number of the officers, who had served in the "old navy" and who had only recently been recommissioned in the new navy. This would eventually give rise to a fateful mutiny, but warning signs had already been received when Lucas was still in his home port of Hellevoetsluis, and would later lead to more frequently than normal instances of "jumping ship" during the voyage, and desertion, even defection, during the stay in Saldanha Bay.

The squadron set sail on 23 February 1796, together with another squadron under Vice-admiral Adriaan Braak, that was destined for the Dutch West Indies, and this combined fleet sailed around Scotland, to evade heavy concentrations of British ships. A severe storm in early March dispersed this fleet, and Lucas' squadron eventually lost contact, after 19 March, and continued separately on its way to the first port of call Puerto de la Luz on Gran Canaria, arriving there on 13 April. In this port the squadron had a layover of no less than 34 days, to make necessary repairs, but mainly to take sufficient potable water for 14 weeks aboard. During this stay at this neutral port, several ships were sighted, that with 20/20 hindsight may be identified as the British frigate HMS La Moselle; HMS Jupiter with a number of transports with 4,000 British troops destined for the Cape aboard; and finally HMS Tremendous (with Admiral Thomas Pringle on board) also convoying troop transports. Though these sightings were not certain at the time, Lucas was later reproached for his failure to pursue these ships, as that might have done some harm to the cause of the enemy (as was his obligation as a naval officer).

On 17 May 1796 Lucas finally left Gran Canaria and on 21 May the squadron crossed the tropic of Cancer, at which time Lucas' promotion to schout-bij-nacht became effective. The squadron then set course for Porto Praia on Cape Verde where it arrived on 26 May. On 29 May Lucas set sail for Brazil, but the Equator was only crossed on 22 June, due to periodical lack of wind in the doldrums, during which the ships lay becalmed. The coast of Brazil was reached on 27 June. Here Lucas could have replenished his water stores, but apparently by this time he already had set his mind on doing this in Saldanha Bay, so after a perfunctory consultation of his council of war (in which essential information was withheld from the other captains), the squadron took advantage of the Westerlies to reach the coast of Africa. The point is important, because by omitting to take in water and other supplies in Brazil, Lucas narrowed his margin of error in case he would have to avoid calling at the Cape, and sail on to Mauritius, in accordance with his secret instructions (which he did not divulge to the council of war at this time).

He did divulge this information at another council of war on 26 July, when the coast of Africa had been reached. But by then more than two months had elapsed since fresh potable water had been taken in and the water reserves had reached a worryingly low level. Because of this and the lack of fresh produce the number of sailors suffering from scurvy had reached a worrying level also. To call at Saldanha Bay therefore was a foregone conclusion. Also, although one of the secret instructions Lucas now informed the others about was that the Tafelbaai at Cape Town needed to be reconnoitered to get information about the strength of the enemy, the council of war agreed that this was superfluous, as it was fairly certain that the Cape Colony was in the hands of the British. The squadron therefore set course for Saldanha Bay, where it arrived in the evening of 6 August 1796.

Shortly after arrival landing parties were sent out to interrogate the local population. The information that was received this way was contradictory, and Lucas tended to doubt it. On 9 August, however, more definite information was received from the servant of a local Boer, who encouraged Lucas to leave as soon as possible, as a British infantry force of appreciable strength was on its way, and the British fleet had been warned of Lucas' presence. However, though several officers testified to the veracity of the (white) servant, because they knew him from previous visits to the Cape Colony, Lucas took him for a spy, and disregarded the message.

Meanwhile, Lucas had taken several measures that tended to lessen the readiness of the ships, like taking down the sails of Dordrecht (despite the objections of his flag captain, James Melvill) and bringing the sick ashore on one of the islands in the bay, who were housed in tents, made of the sails. Lucas replied to Melvill's objections with the remark that they were "lying in the Bosom of Abraham". But what he did not do was possibly even more negligent. He omitted for instance to have a frigate patrol the entrance to the Bay to give early warning of the arrival of an enemy fleet, or to have put shore batteries on strategic points on the shore of the bay, as his officers advised.

The first days were spent taking water aboard from one watering hole, until this ran dry, at which time a different watering hole was taken into use, which, however, lay a larger distance away. The frigate Bellona was sent to cover this spot. On 11 August Lucas sent naval lieutenant Valkenburg, who had a relative in the vicinity, to interrogate the man for information. Valkenburg returned with disturbing news: there was an infantry corps of 1,400 men and some field guns on its way (he had seen the vanguard with his own eyes), but that there was no reliable information about the movements of the English fleet to be had. With this information Lucas convened another council of war that decided to leave the bay as soon as possible. However, the day of departure was eventually fixed at 16 August, and even then that day passed with the squadron still in the bay.

By then it was too late, as in the afternoon of 16 August a British frigate entered the entrance of the bay. It was later said that even then Lucas could have escaped by slipping his anchors, because the first British capital ships only arrived four or five hours later. At the same time the vanguard of the British land force arrived and engaged the Bellona who raked them with a few broadsides, causing the soldiers to retreat. The soldiers soon returned, however, and engaged the ship with howitzers, which caused appreciable damage to Bellona.

As soon as Lucas became aware of the arrival of British ships he ordered his squadron to put springs on the anchor cables, to prepare for a fight at anchor. (Note: Fighting at anchor was done by putting so-called spring lines from a point half-way the side of the ship to the anchor cable at the waterline. This enabled the ship to point either broadside to the enemy, even if the wind would normally point the stern at the enemy, by manipulating the spring lines. This tactic was with success used by a Dutch merchant fleet in the 1655 Battle of Vågen, and would also be used by Admiral Horatio Nelson at the Battle of the Nile in 1798) At the same time Lucas sent long boats to the island where the sick were housed, to get as many as feasible back aboard to reinforce the undermanned crews. But one of the boats absconded to defect to the enemy, so the other boat had to be recalled. He did nothing else, and so the squadron was bottled up in the bay after the main British force of eight ships of the line and about five frigates entered the bay, and anchored in line of battle outside the reach of the Dutch guns.

Apparently, Lucas intended to lay at anchor, with springs on, and some gun crews ready for action, during the night. But the crew of Revolutie now started to show signs of unrest. Some NCOs had entered captain Rynbende's cabin and threatened him. He was able to restore order, but it did nothing to calm the nerves of the officers in the council of war that Lucas convened at 11 PM that night. He told the other captains that he had received an ultimatum from the commander of the opposing fleet, Admiral George Elphinstone to surrender the squadron, and not make an attempt to sabotage the ships. He also told them that in a written exchange with Elphinstone he had already given the latter his word of honor that he would not try to damage his ships while negotiations were going on. In the light of this information the council of war decided unanimously to negotiate terms with Elphinstone, as resistance appeared to be useless. They motivated this with two considerations: the mutinous attitude of the crews, which made it more likely that they would murder their officers than fight, and that it was impossible to beach the ships and burn them, because the British land force blocked escape by land, and the crews would equally oppose this. To avoid a massacre capitulation on terms therefore seemed inevitable. The council then devised a number of terms they would propose to the British commander, among which were the condition that the officers and crews would get passage on two cartel ships back to the Batavian Republic. Elphinstone rejected these proposals, and demanded that the officers would become prisoners of war. He offered verbally to release the officers if they would later give their parole. When the Dutch parlimentaire capt. Claris returned with this answer, and it became known that the British Major-General James Henry Craig had threatened to give no quarter in case the ships were damaged, the council of war decided to surrender unconditionally, as they could not guarantee the latter in view of the mutinous attitude of the crews.

After the British had taken possession of the ships all military discipline aboard broke down, despite the presence of British guards. On some ships mutineers, sporting orange-colored rags, ripped up Batavian flags, while shouting Orangist and anti-Patriot slogans. On others, officers, NCOs and crew members suspected of Patriot sympathies were pursued and assaulted. In some cases Patriot sympathizers banded together to defend their lives with their side arms; in other cases crew members with Patriot sympathies cursed Lucas and his officers for "cowardly" surrendering the ships without a fight. Everywhere larders and liquor cabinets were broken open and looted, chests with personal belongings and wine casks stolen. In some cases this lasted all night and resumed the next day, until the British intervened and arrested the ring leaders.

Most of the NCOs and crew members enlisted in the Royal Navy. Some of those took part in the Battle of Camperdown of 1797 on the British side. Most officers returned to the Batavian Republic aboard a cartel ship in December 1796, but Lucas, and captains Rynbende and Claris booked passage on a neutral American ship and arrived in February 1797 in Plymouth; Lucas from there went back to the Netherlands aboard a ship under Prussian flag, and went home to Schiedam. He reported his arrival to the Naval Affairs Committee of the National Assembly, who ordered him to be incarcerated in Huis ten Bosch near The Hague. Here he prepared himself for his court-martial before the Hoge Zeekrijgsraad (High Naval Court) that had been impaneled by the National Assembly. (Note: On 19 May 1797. This court consisted of the vice-admirals Sels and Van der Beets, and the commanders van Overveldt, van Kerchem, Grootenraad, Holland, and Byls. Grootenraad and Holland were later replaced by cdr. Gervaas; de Jonge b., p. 272) He wrote a Generaal Rapport, containing his version of events, which he completed on 18 April 1797. No doubt he intended this to be the basis of his defense. But his health had been bad since the surrender and deteriorated (probably from stress) further in the ensuing months. He now became so ill, that he was allowed to return home. He died of his illness a few days after returning home, on 21 June 1797.

== Postscript ==
Lucas' untimely, though long-expected, death (Note: The cause of death remains murky. Spoors writes that it was "an illness, which for a long time had been considered incurable" (Spoors, report, p. 1), but gives no further details. There is no suggestion it was anything other than a physical sickness, though it may have worsened under the influence of mental stress. In one of the genealogical sources it is asserted that it was a consequence of an accident that occurred during Lucas' sojourn in the Cape Colony.) presented the Hoge Zeekrijgsraad with a quandary. Lucas' trial had been about to begin, but could not proceed, as the Batavian Republic, under the Declaration of the Rights of Man and the Citizen, did not allow posthumous trials, let alone sentences. On the other hand, the trial of the other officers could not be fair, if the case of the main defendant remained unresolved. The court therefore decided to entrust the fiscaal (prosecutor), Jacobus Spoors with an inquest, in which all witnesses were deposed, and which resulted in a lengthy report. This was accepted by the Court, which passed sentence on the living defendants on 14 December 1797. All were acquitted, as the preponderant responsibility for the mishap with the squadron was adjudged to lie with Lucas. The report and the sentence were communicated to the National Assembly, which decided to publish both in 1798.

The court, and therefore Spoors, limited themselves to two questions: 1. had Lucas followed his instructions, and was the surrender a consequence of his possible disregard of those instructions; and 2. had there been other acts or omissions by Lucas, and/or the other officers, contrary to what might be expected from a Batavian naval officer, and which had contributed to the loss of the squadron? Spoors conscientiously tried to answer these questions in 138 pages, with no less than 282 footnotes, mostly referring to depositions. He appears to have bent over backwards to be fair to Lucas, but it must be remembered that Lucas had not had an opportunity to defend himself (though use was made of his Generaal Rapport), and that the depositions of the other officers may not always have been fully truthful, or fair to Lucas. So there remains a whiff of scape-goating around the procedure. In the main, Lucas was considered to have been most culpable in disregarding the instruction of the former States General not to call at any place in the Cape Colony in case he was certain that that Colony was occupied by a superior enemy force, but to proceed forthwith to the French colony of Isle de France in that case. As to his conduct during the sojourn in Saldanha bay he was adjudged to have been derelict in his duty to secure the safety of the fleet by putting shore batteries in place, and taking measures to get early warning of the arrival of enemy ships. Also, he should not prematurely have given his word of honor to refrain from sabotaging the ships and kept his head when the mutiny started. In sum, Spoors writes that these examples of dereliction of duty were in his opinion the consequence of lack of military competence and arrogance, but that there was no reason to doubt Lucas' honesty or bona fides, and he expresses his feeling that, had Lucas lived and been sentenced, mitigating factors should have been taken into account.
