= Dutch ship Wassenaar (1781) =

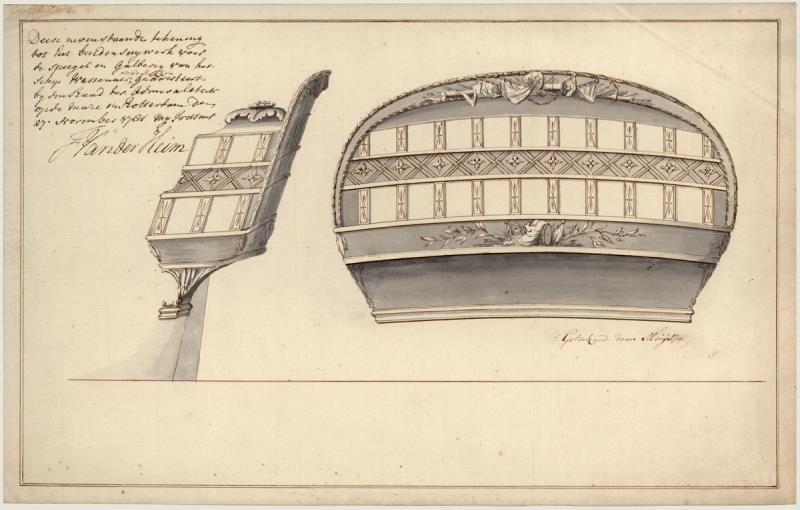
- Stern of Wassenaar

History

Dutch Republic
- Name: Wassenaar
- Builder: Zwindrecht, Rotterdam
- Launched: 1781
- Commissioned: 1781

Batavian Republic
- Name: Wassenaar
- Out of service: 1797
- Fate: Captured

History

Great Britain
- Name: HMS Wassenaar
- Acquired: 1797
- Commissioned: 1797
- Decommissioned: 1815
- Reclassified: Powder hulk in 1802
- Fate: Sold for breaking up, 1818

General characteristics
- Class & type: 64-gun ship of the line
- Tons burthen: 1,269 48/94 (bm)
- Length: 158 ft 2 in (48.2 m) (gundeck); 131 ft 1.25 in (40.0 m) (keel)
- Beam: 42 ft 8 in (13.0 m)
- Depth of hold: 20 ft 2.5 in (6.2 m)
- Sail plan: Full-rigged ship
- Complement: 491 (250 as troopship)
- Armament: In Dutch service; Lower gundeck: 26 × 32-pounder guns; Upper gundeck: 26 × 18-pounder guns; Quarterdeck and forecastle: 14 × 8-pounder guns; In British service; Lower gundeck: 28 × 24-pounder guns; Upper gundeck: 28 × 18-pounder guns; Quarterdeck: 8 × 9-pounder guns; Forecastle: 2 × 9-pounder guns; no guns as a troop ship and hulk.

Wassenaar was a 64-gun ship of the line of the Dutch States Navy. The order to construct the ship was given by the Admiralty of Rotterdam. The ship was commissioned in 1781. From 1783 to 1784, Wassenaar sailed to Batavia under Captain Gerardus Oorthuis.

In 1795, the ship was commissioned into the Batavian Navy. On 11 October 1797 Wassenaar took part in the Battle of Camperdown under Captain Adolph Holland. Holland was killed during the battle, and his ship surrendered to HMS Triumph. Triumph then sailed on to the centre of the battle, and when Wassenaar was fired on by a Batavian brig, the crew raised the Batavian flag again. But in the end they were captured again by the British.

As HMS Wassenaar, the ship first served as a troop ship. In February 1798 she was the flagship of Admiral Joseph Peyton in the Downs. In the years 1800-1802 she served in the Mediterranean. In her final years (1802–1815) she lay at Chatham as a powder hulk, until she was finally sold for breaking up in 1818.
