= Engelbertus Lucas Jr. =

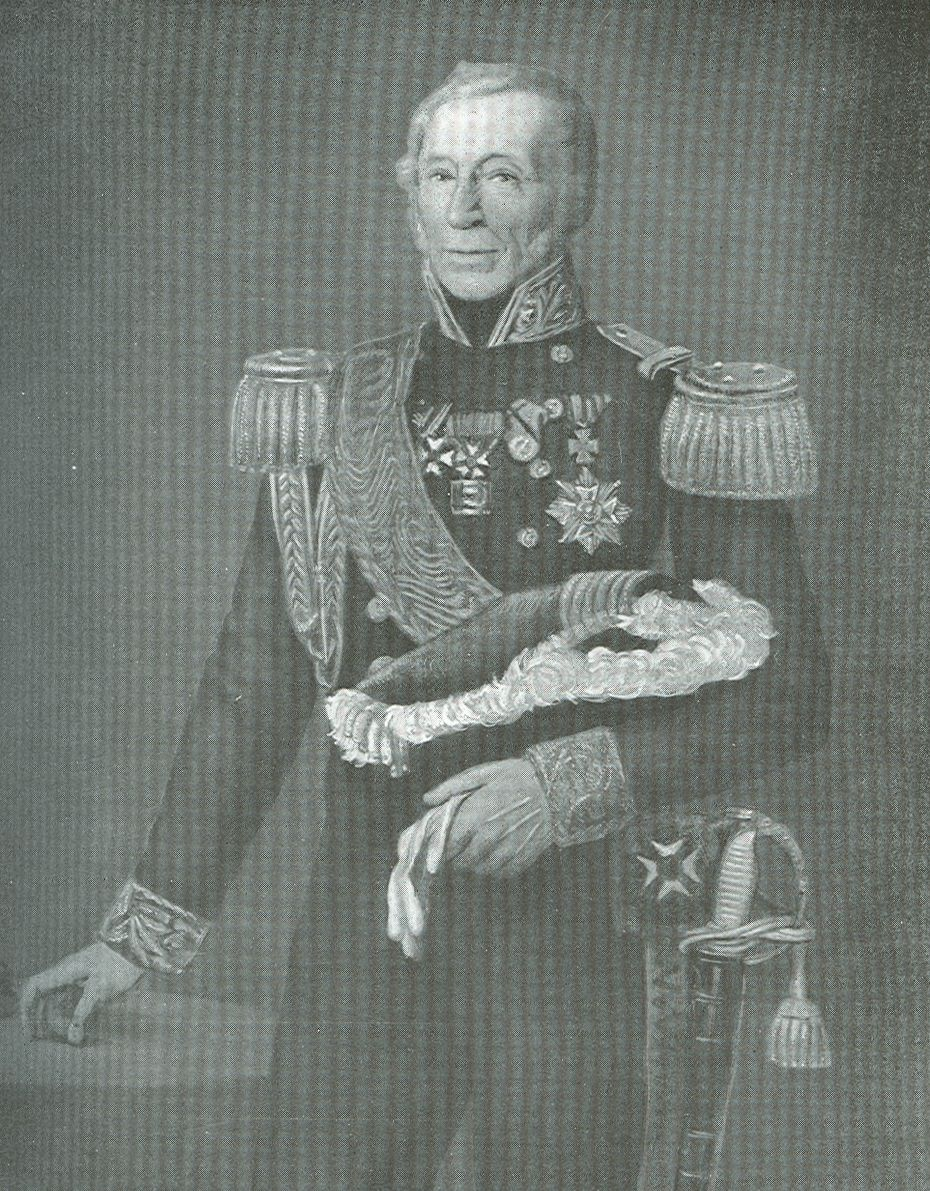
Portrait of Lucas

Lieutenant-Admiral Engelbertus Lucas Jr. (30 May 1785 – 12 May 1870) was a Dutch naval officer. Over the course of his career, he served in the Batavian Navy, French Imperial Navy and Royal Netherlands Navy and was appointed as Dutch Minister for the Navy in the first cabinet of Prime Minister Johan Rudolph Thorbecke from 1849 to 1851.

== Personal life ==
Lucas was born the son of future rear-admiral Engelbertus Lucas Sr. of the Batavian Navy and Catharina Prins, later a business woman who was a distiller of Jenever in his birthplace Schiedam, on 30 May 1785. He married Louisa Elisabeth Lamaison.

== Career ==
Lucas entered the new cadet corps of the Batavian Navy in 1795, two years before the death of his father. He was promoted to cadet-first class in 1801. In 1802 he was commissioned as a naval lieutenant (junior grade). In 1808 he was promoted to naval lieutenant in the royal navy of the Kingdom of Holland, which he remained after the annexation of the Netherlands by the French Empire (being integrated in the French navy), until the country regained its independence in 1813. In 1814 he was promoted to commander in the Royal Dutch Navy. His promotion to kapitein ter zee followed in 1826. He was made a rear-admiral in 1837, and a vice-admiral in 1844. He retained that rank during his stint as Minister for the Navy from 1849 to 1851. On 21 April 1851 (after his resignation from the government) he resigned his commission for reasons of age, but on 1 June 1865 he was promoted to lieutenant-admiral (ret.), the highest rank in the Royal Dutch navy.

His functions as a naval officer included commander of the ship-of-the-line Zr.Ms. De Zeeuw in 1827, and commander of troop transports in the Scheldt (the Bath squadron) during the conflict with Belgium in 1833. He lost the frigate Zr. Ms. Sumatra due to an accident on the Scheldt.

From 1 August 1838 to 1 March 1842 he was Commander of the Dutch navy in the Dutch East Indies, and at the same time Inspector of the Colonial navy (the predecessor of the Gouvernementsmarine).

From 1 October 1843 to 1 November 1849 he was Director of the Directorate of the Navy at Vlissingen.

At the insistence of king William III of the Netherlands he was included as Minister for the Navy in the first Cabinet of Prime Minister Thorbecke (though that statesman would have preferred his political ally Isaäc Theodorus ter Bruggen Hugenholtz) on 1 November 1849. Lucas proposed a renovation of the lock at Willemstad in the 1851 budget. This was approved by the Tweede Kamer of the States General of the Netherlands, though with only a ten-vote majority (32-22). Being a short-tempered man, Lucas took umbrage and resigned from the office. The proposal was later defeated 8-25 in the Eerste Kamer.

After his retirement Lucas remained a courtier at the Dutch court. He was appointed Aide de Camp of the king in extraordinary service on 24 April 1850. He was also appointed Chancellor of the Military Order of William (he had himself been knighted in that order in 1842), and the Order of the Netherlands Lion (of which he was made a Commander in 1846, and promoted to Grand Cross in 1849).

After his appointment as Minister Lucas and his wife lived in hotel Groot Keizershof in the Hague. After the death of his wife in 1852 Lucas moved to Lange Voorhout No. 92, where he died on 11 March 1870, almost 85 years old.

=== Sources ===
- (in Dutch) E. Lucas on the website Parlement en Politiek
- (in Dutch) Royen, R. van, Eene briefwisseling tusschen Mr C.L. Luzac en E. Lucas 1838-1842, in: Bijdragen en Mededelingen van het Historisch Genootschap. Deel 65 (1947), pp. 238ff.
