= Batavian Navy =

Navy of the Batavian Republic (1795–1806)

- Bataafsche marine
- Ensign of the Batavian Navy
- Active: 1795–1806
- Country: Batavian Republic
- Branch: Navy
- Engagements: French Revolutionary Wars; Napoleonic Wars

Commanders
- Notable commanders: Jan Willem de Winter; Johan Arnold Bloys van Treslong; Samuel Story; Engelbertus Lucas Sr.

The Batavian Navy (Dutch: Bataafsche marine) was the navy of the Batavian Republic which existed from 1795 to 1806. Founded in May 1795 after the Dutch Republic was overrun by France during the French Revolutionary Wars and transformed into the Batavian Republic, it assumed control over the ships and administrative infrastructure of the Dutch States Navy. The Batavian navy underwent a thorough reorganisation and embarked on several construction programmes in an attempt to match the strength of its main rival, the Royal Navy. Despite this, the British navy inflicted several crushing defeats on the Batavian Navy at the capitulation of Saldanha Bay, Battle of Camperdown and Vlieter incident.

The British also occupied much of the Dutch colonial empire during the French Revolutionary Wars, which the Batavian Navy was powerless to prevent. Despite losing much of its fleet by 1802, the Batavian navy's reorganisations proved to be durable, and it played a role in Napoleon's planned invasion of the United Kingdom and efforts to restore Batavian rule in the Dutch colonies returned by Britain under the Treaty of Amiens. However, the Batavian Navy was again unable to prevent Britain from occupying its colonies after the Napoleonic Wars began in 1803. The Batavian Republic became the Kingdom of Holland in June 1806, with the Batavian navy being transformed into the navy of the Kingdom of Holland.

== Background ==
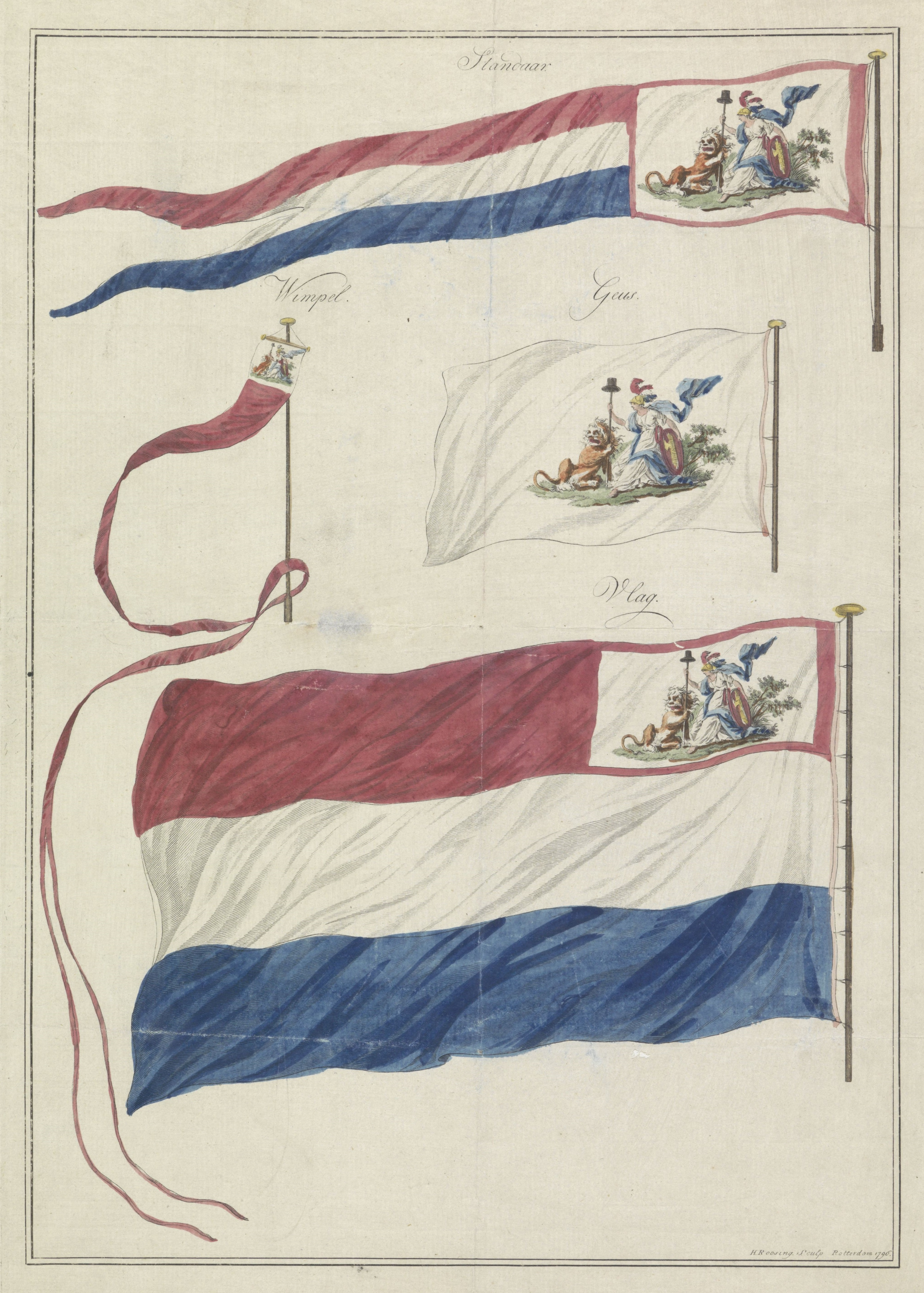
The ensign, jack and pennon of the Batavian navy

In 1777, the Dutch Republic embarked on a program of expanding the States Navy, which had suffered from decades of neglect. From 1777 to 1789, 92 warships were built, of which 45 were ships of the line. However, from 1789 to 1795, only six ships (including two ships of the line) were built, with the States Navy once again suffering from neglect. While the new ships were built with poor-quality materials, they incorporated recent technological developments such as copper sheathing and carronades. Naval establishments, like the port at Den Helder and the dry dock at Vlissingen were repaired and improved.

In 1792, the decision was made to reserve a fixed sum on the war budget for maintenance of the States Navy, which had up to that point been the responsibility of the Dutch admiralties. William V, Prince of Orange proposed in 1792 to form a permanent formation of marines, though this was rejected. A few years later, he was more successful with the establishment of a corps of gunners. Plans for establishing a corps of midshipmen, to revise the articles of war for the Dutch navy and to have the government pay for the meals of the crews (instead of charging them for) went nowhere.

The officers and crews of the Dutch navy were experienced and professional, though the former's knowledge of sailing ship tactics were poor. Officers like Jan Hendrik van Kinsbergen published naval instructions to remedy this situation in the 1780s. Van Kinsbergen also improved the General Seinbook (General signal book) which was used to communicate at sea between ships, along with introducing reforms to improve military discipline in the navy. Several improvements were made after the Fourth Anglo-Dutch War, but the incompetence of the admiralties was a big drag on progress. Grand Pensionary Laurens Pieter van de Spiegel attempted to reorganize them into a modern navy department, but was thwarted by vested interests. The state of the Dutch, therefore, was dire when war with the French First Republic broke out in 1793, and the Dutch Republic was eventually overrun by the French army in January 1795.

== Establishment of the Batavian navy ==
=== Abolition of the admiralties and other institutions of the States Navy ===
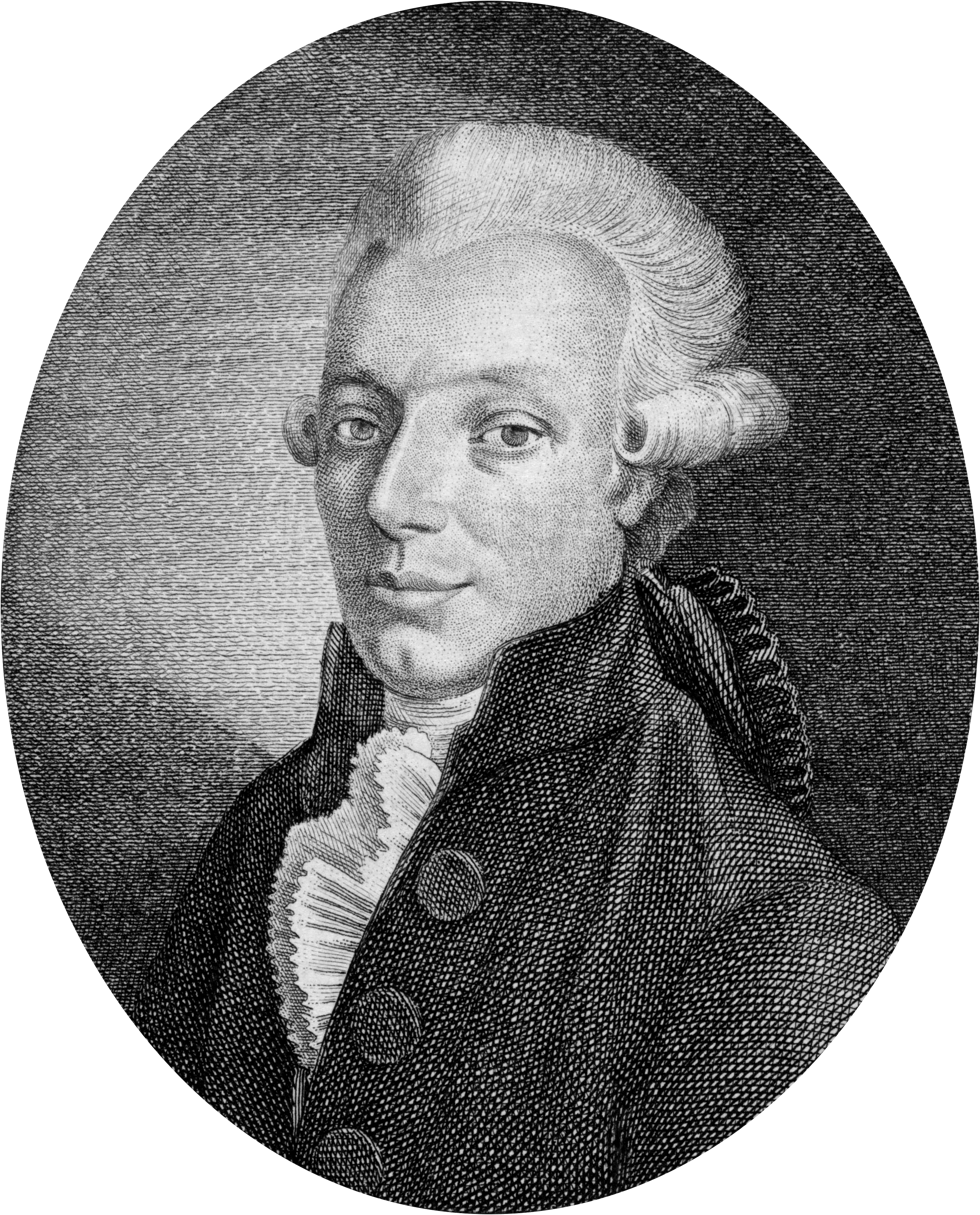
Pieter Paulus who pushed through the early naval reforms

Most of the Dutch States Navy was captured by French forces in early 1795. (Note: On 23 January 1795, a Dutch fleet of five ships of the line, three frigates, six corvettes and four cutters, immobilized by ice in the Texel roadstead, surrendered to French hussars after the Gecommitteerde Raden of the States of Holland had ordered the fleet's commander Captain Hermanus Reintjes to surrender on 21 January. Other States Navy warships had already surrendered earlier on the orders of the Dutch supreme command; de Jonge, pp. 178-193) (Note: At the same time seven States Navy warships and a number of Dutch East India Company (VOC) and non-VOC Dutch merchantmen were impounded in British ports. These ships were declared prizes in March 1796 by British authorities and pressed into the Royal Navy or used as merchantmen; de Jonge, pp.199-201) The officers and crews were paid off, and French crews took over the Dutch warships. However, after the Treaty of The Hague had been concluded, the warships were returned to the Batavian Republic. Meanwhile, the old organisational structure of the Dutch navy had been overturned. The office of Stadtholder, who also had been Captain-General of the Dutch States Army, and Admiral-General of the fleet, was abolished right away in the first days of the Batavian Revolution. Soon the admiralty boards were abolished and replaced by a standing Committee on Naval Affairs of the Provisional Representatives of the People of Holland. (Note: This was done on the initiative of Pieter Paulus, a former advocaat fiscaal (military prosecutor) of the Admiralty of Rotterdam, who was chairman of the Provisional Representatives. He also assumed the chair of the new Committee, in which capacity he managed to push through a large number of reforms, even though he soon died in office. To avoid misunderstandings: the Provisional Representatives were an organ of the province of Holland, whereas most of the reforms were formally instituted by the States General of the Batavian Republic. However, this may be explained by the fact that (as under the old Republic) Holland had the most influential delegation in the States General, and often took the initiative that then was rubber stamped by the other provincial delegations. After April 1796 the Committee for Naval Affairs was replaced by a similarly named body of the new National Assembly of the Batavian Republic; de Jonge, pp. 207-208) A measure that would have a long-lasting deleterious influence was the wholesale cashiering of the corps of naval officers.

=== Personnel reforms ===
In 1787, after the repression of the Patriot revolution through Prussian military intervention, the Dutch navy was purged of suspected members of the Patriot faction. Many were forced to go into exile (among them Jan Willem de Winter, the future commander-in-chief of the Batavian navy, who was a lieutenant at the time). Many of these people returned with the Dutch troops in the army of the French Republic (de Winter as a général de brigade). They felt not only hatred for the defeated Stadtholderate, but also for its adherents under the naval officers, who had conducted the purge in 1787. The purge that the Naval Affairs Committee now instituted probably was therefore motivated by this rancor, and also by the fear that the "old guard" officers would constitute a "Fifth column". But the immediate effect of the rash measure was that the navy lost a large number of experienced and competent officers, like Admiral Van Kinsbergen, who later refused to return to the service, when they were asked. The Batavian navy, therefore, started out with a new officer corps that was qualitatively substandard, many flag officers having been promoted from subaltern ranks, without having acquired the necessary experience, especially in combat. The new officer corps also became divided between the "new" and "old" officers (after some of those returned) who mutually mistrusted each other, leading to frequent suspicions of disloyalty, even treason.

The new navy needed a new commander-in-chief immediately and in this post, the former navy lieutenant (but now general) de Winter was appointed (12 March 1795). (Note: This decision was also hastened by the fact that a French rear-admiral, Pierre Jean Van Stabel, had come to Flushing, apparently to take command of the Batavian fleet. This was something the leaders of the Republic wanted to avoid at any price; de Jonge, p, 211) This was followed by the appointment of six vice-admirals (one of whom was de Winter) and three rear-admirals on 26 July 1795. The quick elevation of de Winter above his older, and more experienced, colleagues could only cause jealousy, and this later proved a dangerous flaw for the leadership of the navy. Another source of discontent was that the pay scales for the officers were not established for another two years (Note: At the same time the establishment of the officer corps was then set at 1 lt-admiral, 4 vice-admirals, 6 rear-admirals, 12 captains first class, 12 captains second class, 36 commanders, 36 first lieutenants, and several hundred subaltern officers; this for a fleet of 20 to 25 ships of the line, and 50 to 60 frigates and smaller vessels; de Jonge, p.214, note 1) (which caused much uncertainty among them, and was seen as a sign of low esteem).

To assure the quality of the education of naval officers Jan Hendrik van Swinden was appointed "examinator-general." To manage the naval shipyards (each admiralty previously had had one, autonomous, shipyard to build warships) one "constructor-general" was appointed (Pieter Glavimans, the superintendent of the Rotterdam shipyard). The criminal justice system in the navy was put in the hands of a Provost marshal for the navy. A commission for Pilotage was formed under direct control of the Naval Affairs Committee, and an officer charged with surveying the harbors and coastal waters and publishing naval charts.

Finally, the 1702 Articles of War for the navy were modernized (punishments like keelhauling, inconsistent with the Declaration of the Rights of Man and the Citizen, adopted by the Provisional Representatives on 31 January 1795, were abolished, and replaced with more humane forms). The General Order for the Service at Sea was also modernized.

=== Commission on the state of the fleet ===
The fleet had been severely neglected in the years before the revolution by the old regime (for which the Stadtholder was held responsible by the new regime). To get a view of what the real state of the fleet was, the Naval Affairs Committee appointed a commission, consisting of its member, the distinguished scientist Henricus Aeneae, the future rear-admirals Samuel Story and Engelbertus Lucas, and Constructor-General Glavimans to inspect the ships then in service (26 February 1795). The commission already reported on 26 May 1795. (Note: Rapport wegens den staat van 's Lands schepen van oorlog en kleinere vaartuigen tot den zeedienst betreklyk: midsgaders den staat der havens, scheeps- timmerwerven, magazynen, arsenaalen, enz. : zoo als zich die, by inspectie van de Ondergeteekende Leden eener door Hun Hoog Mogenden daar toe aangestelde Commissie bevonden, in het voorjaar, of in de maanden van Maart en April, des Jaars 1795, Volume 1 ('sLands drukkerij 1796)) It reported that the navy had available 40 ships of the line of different ratings, 35 frigates, and 104 smaller vessels. However, many of these ships were in bad repair, and could only be made operational after expensive repairs would be made. The commission judged that only four ships of the line of 74 guns, fourteen of 60 to 68 guns, and six of 50 to 56 guns, would be worth the trouble to be made operational; likewise, five frigates of 40 to 46 guns, eight of 36, and eleven of 20 to 24 guns (24 ships of the line and 24 frigates in total). The remainder should be scrapped (at a cost of 3.3 million guilders, while the cost of the repairs would be 4.7 million guilders). Fortunately, the state of the shipyards was satisfactory, though the stocks of materials were below par. The state of the naval installations, like ports and docks, varied, with some needing appreciable investments.

=== Fleet building program of 1795 and 1796 ===
Though the Naval Affairs Committee waited for a formal reaction to the commission's report till 18 December 1795, informally it started making policy on the basis of provisional recommendations it received. On 17 March 1795 it submitted a proposal to the States General to vote a budget of 7.8 million guilders to reconstruct twelve ships of the line, fourteen frigates, and six smaller vessels, plus eleven coastal defense ships to guard the coastal inlets, to be manned by 9880 sailors. In addition, it proposed the new construction of three ships of the line and three frigates at an estimated cost of 2.4 million guilders. In addition a sum of five million guilders had to be supplied to pay the overdue debts of the old admiralties, as credit for new construction would otherwise not be forthcoming from suppliers. The entire financial need for the next twelve months for the navy was estimated at 15.2 million guilders. The States General then voted a total budget for sea and land forces of 32 million guilders. The provincial delegations in the States General then committed themselves to supply ten million (seven million from Holland alone) guilders as an emergency budget, of which six million was destined for the navy.

The financing having been secured, the navy then started with alacrity to implement the construction program. The shipyards of the old admiralties were in principle available, but they needed administrative reform. It was therefore decided to concentrate the bulk of big-ship construction at the Amsterdam shipyard. On the other hand, Hoorn would henceforth specialize in the construction of frigates, and Enkhuizen be relegated to the construction of small vessels. Harlingen would henceforth limit itself to the construction of brigs for the inland waterways and Medemblik would be given the naval installations to support an anchorage for the reserve fleet in the Zuiderzee. The roadstead at the Texel, though it had been improved with hydraulic engineering, was not yet deemed usable as a fixed naval base.

Though the new shipbuilding activity was started with great enthusiasm (and it stimulated the local economy of Amsterdam no end), it soon got into financial difficulties as the land provinces were remiss in providing the promised emergency financing. Construction ground to a halt in the second part of 1795, until the Naval Affairs Committee, in desperation, threatened to resign in September 1795. This had the desired result. Up to the middle of 1796 the fleet grew to 66 ships, among which 20 ships of the line, and 30 frigates.

== Naval calamities: causes and consequences ==
=== Recruitment problems ===
After the crews of the old navy had been paid off in February 1795, remanning the fleet became an urgent need. Re-enlistment of some previous naval personnel was helped by the fact that due to the dire economic situation of the shipping industry there was widespread unemployment under able seamen. However, recruitment turned out to be slow. The Dutch navy had never used impressment, like the Royal Navy, and conscription, both for the navy and the army, would only be introduced in the Netherlands after the annexation by the French empire in 1810. So the Batavian navy had to use moral suasion (an appeal to the patriotism of the citizens) and high enlistment bonuses to persuade suitable candidates to enlist. This attracted many foreign sailors, who had been employed by the Dutch merchant marine, but were now unemployed. Dutchmen needed more encouragement, so the navy was forced to use many less-suitable candidates, like the pupils in the orphanages. Also the government decided to force a number of the mercenaries of the Batavian army to transfer to the navy, a very unpopular policy, that caused the desertion rates in the army to increase.

The dearth of professional non-commissioned officers was especially pressing. These career navy personnel, like bosuns and bosun's mates, and specialists like, gunners and gunner's mates could only be found among the ranks of personnel of the old navy. But these people were among the most pro-Orangist and anti-Patriot groups in the country, and therefore either unwilling to re-enlist, or if they did (because of economic necessity), they formed an unreliable element among the ship's crews. That unreliability was particularly important, because these NCOs and specialists formed the intermediary layer between officers and common seamen, and as the "natural leaders" of the men had a special influence on opinion formation. Repeatedly, these key personnel proved to be either Orangist "agitators" themselves, or at least to turn a blind eye to political agitation, that would foment mutinies at crucial moments.

The first consequence of this recruitment problem was that the newly-operational ships had to stay in port, due to lack of personnel to sail in them. The government, therefore, intensified its efforts to make enlistment more attractive. A propaganda effort was mounted, a commission of notables promoted enlistment, and most importantly, financial incentives were given or at least promised, and this finally got the stream of enlistees going, so that in the Spring of 1796 the fleet was sufficiently manned, to at least put the ships to sea.

But then the government did something in March 1796 that undermined the morale of the new crews. Up to that moment, the Batavian Republic had still used the flag of the old Republic, known as the Prince's Flag. But the authorities now decided to do away with this symbol of the old regime, and to issue a proclamation by which a new flag design was instituted (see illustration at the top of this article). This measure was, of course, popular with the partisans of the government, but very unpopular with the Orangists in the country, many of whom belonged to the groups in the population from which the navy recruited its enlistees. The new flag therefore mainly served to undermine the morale of the sailors in the fleet, which would prove to have dire consequences in the future.

=== The Saldanha Bay capitulation ===
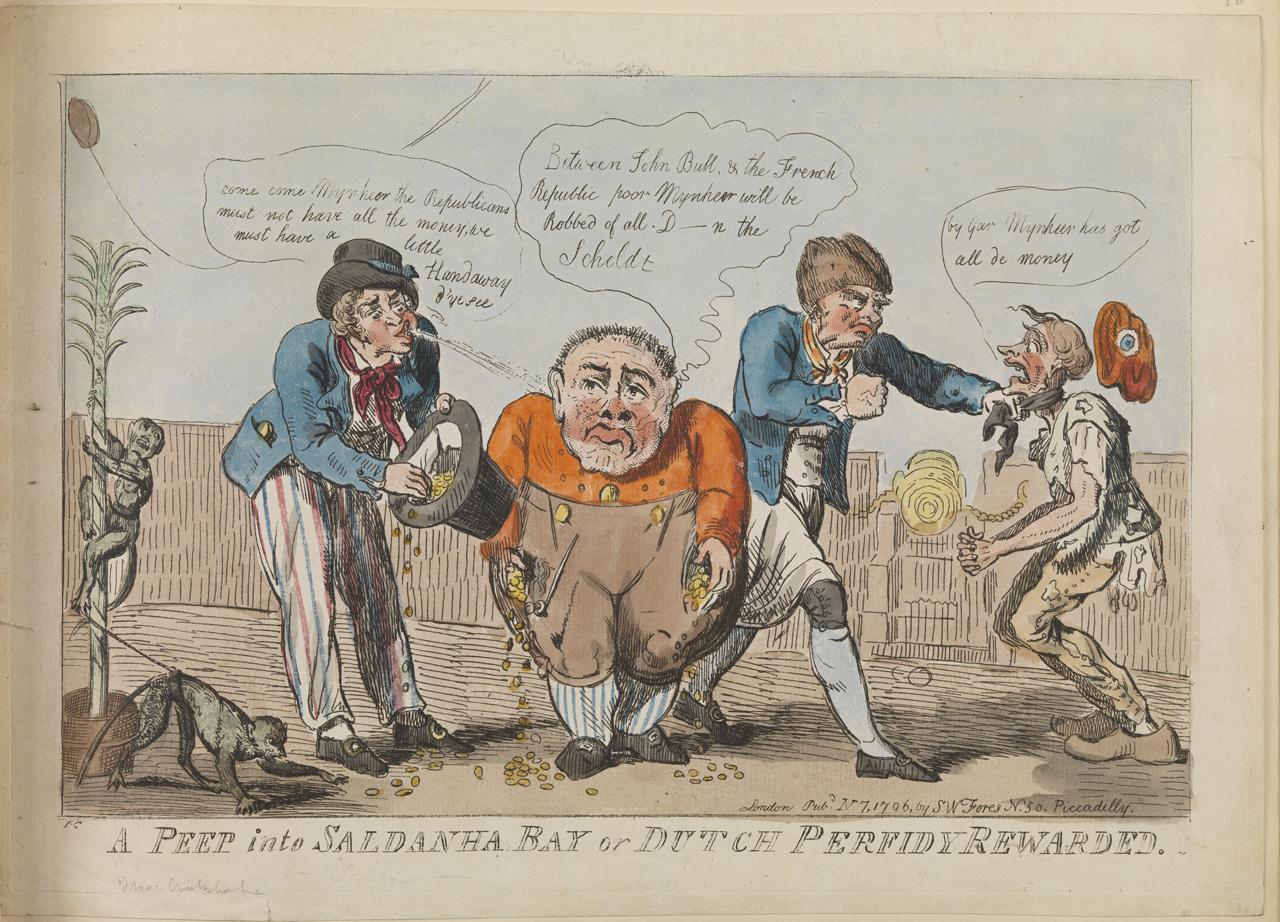
A Peep into Saldanha Bay or Dutch Perfidy Rewarded by Isaac Cruikshank

The Dutch Cape Colony had been captured by the British in September 1795. This put the communication lines to the Dutch East Indies (which had become the responsibility of the Batavian government after the VOC went bankrupt and was nationalized) in jeopardy. The government, therefore, felt constrained to mount an expedition in early 1796 that was charged with the reconquest of the Cape Colony, and subsequently would sail on to the Indies. A fleet, commanded by captain Engelbertus Lucas Sr., (Note: Lucas, though only a captain, was selected for the command, as he seems to have been the only senior officer who had been to the Indies before (with an expedition under command of Commodore Sylvester from 1785 to 1789). The States Navy limited itself to the European waters and the Atlantic Ocean, as the VOC possessed a substantial number of ships of itself and was usually able to dominate the fleet of the rival British East India Company, at least until the Royal Navy started to intervene during the Fourth Anglo-Dutch War; de Jonge, p. 237, and note 1) of three ships of the line, five frigates and an armed merchantman (with letters of marque), (Note: The ships of the line Revolutie (cap. Lucas), Dordrecht (cap. Rynbende), Tromp (cdr. Valkenburg), and the frigates Castor (cdr. Claris), Brave (cdr. Zoetemans), Sirene (cdr. de Cerf), Bellona (cdr. de Falck), Havik (lt. Besemer), and the armed merchantman Vrouwe Maria (lt. Barbier); de Jonge, p. 237.) 340 guns and 1972 men, set sail on 23 February 1796 (together with another fleet under Vice-Admiral Adriaan Braak, destined for the Dutch Caribbean). After sailing around Scotland the two fleets split up. Lucas followed the usual route to the Canary Islands, and from there to Brazil, to take advantage of the westerlies toward the Cape of Good Hope.

The fleet stayed no less than 34 days at the bay of La Luz, Gran Canaria to take in water and supplies. During that period two events happened that would have a great influence on further developments. First, a frigate was observed, that was probably HMS Mozelle, that would warn the British forces of the imminent arrival of the Batavian force. But Lucas did not have the ship pursued. Next, a ship of the line, flying the Spanish flag was observed sailing past the bay, but again Lucas did nothing, despite the protest of his captains. This may have been HMS Tremendous under Rear-Admiral Thomas Pringle, convoying a flotilla of transports with British troops for the Cape on board.

After crossing the Tropic of Cancer on 21 May, Lucas hoisted his rear-admiral's pennant, as his promotion now came into effect. After consulting his officers he set sail for Praia on Cape Verde, and from there to Rio de Janeiro, where he omitted, however, to take in water, as by then he apparently had already privately decided to sail directly to Saldanha Bay in the Cape colony, despite the fact that he knew that the Cape was in British hands. He had secret instructions to sail on to Mauritius in case the Cape were securely in British hands (which had been uncertain when the fleet sailed, but had now been confirmed), but he did not inform his council of war of this, so his officers agreed with the plan to go to the bay, also because the lack of water became pressing. The fleet arrived in the bay on 6 August, without having met British ships.

What happened next, therefore, was for a large part the fault of Rear-Admiral Lucas and his neglectful conduct. He was soon confronted by a superior British force, both at sea and on land even though he had been warned by people living nearby that an appreciable British infantry force was nearing. The work of taking in water was going forward very slowly, as it had to be obtained from far inland, so the fleet lost several days in which it would still have been able to get away. The sailors who went ashore showed a disturbing tendency to desert or defect to the enemy. Meanwhile, Lucas did not make haste, mostly because he discounted news of a British fleet coming near. Departure had been set for 16 August, but again was delayed. And by then it was too late and the fleet was surrounded both on land, and by sea.

Lucas at first prepared to fight at anchor, but mutinies broke out aboard the ships of the line Revolutie and Dordrecht, and the frigate Castor. The mutineers, apparently led by their "deck officers" (NCOs), threatened to shoot the officers if they would open fire on the British ships. General James Craig, commanding the British troops on land, threatened to deny quarter if attempts were made by the Batavians to beach or otherwise sabotage their ships. Lucas and his council of war then decided to capitulate more or less unconditionally, after Vice-Admiral George Elphinstone refused offers of conditional surrender.

After the fleet had surrendered, the Batavian officers entreated the British to take possession of the ships as soon as possible, and to disarm the mutineers, as they were in fear of their lives. After the British had taken possession, all military discipline aboard the Batavian ships collapsed. Drunken sailors, shouting Orangist slogans, trampled the Batavian flag, and officers and sailors of known Patriot sympathies were assaulted, and had to defend themselves with their side arms. Stores of victuals and especially liquor, were looted. This went on until the British intervened and arrested the ringleaders.

Most of the crew members defected to the British. The officers were transported to the Batavian Republic in a cartel ship, after having given their parole. After Lucas returned to the Netherlands, he was arrested by the Naval Affairs Committee, and imprisoned in the Huis ten Bosch palace, pending his court-martial. During this imprisonment his health deteriorated so fast, that he had to be allowed to go home, and he died soon afterward, on 21 June 1797.

Exceptionally, the National Assembly of the Batavian Republic decided to impanel a Hoge Zeekrijgsraad (High Naval Court) itself (19 May 1797). Jacobus Spoors was appointed prosecutor. As Lucas had died, he could no longer be tried, however. So it was decided to commission Spoors to conduct an investigation into Lucas' conduct, and write a report. This report was eventually adopted by the Court, and presented to the National Assembly. As the report put the main responsibility for the loss of the fleet on Lucas, the other officers were acquitted of dereliction of duty. Spoors' report was (with some redactions because of national security) published in 1798. (Note: Rapport van Jakob Spoors, als fiscaal van den hoogen zee-krygsraad, omtrend het gedrag van den capitein Engelbertus Lucas en verdere commandanten der schepen behoord hebbende tot het esquader in den jaare 1796, naar de Oost-indien gedestineerd: benevens de resolutie en sententie ten deze door den hoogen zee krygsraad genomen en geslagen ('sLands drukkerij 1798))

=== The "Enterprise of Ireland" ===
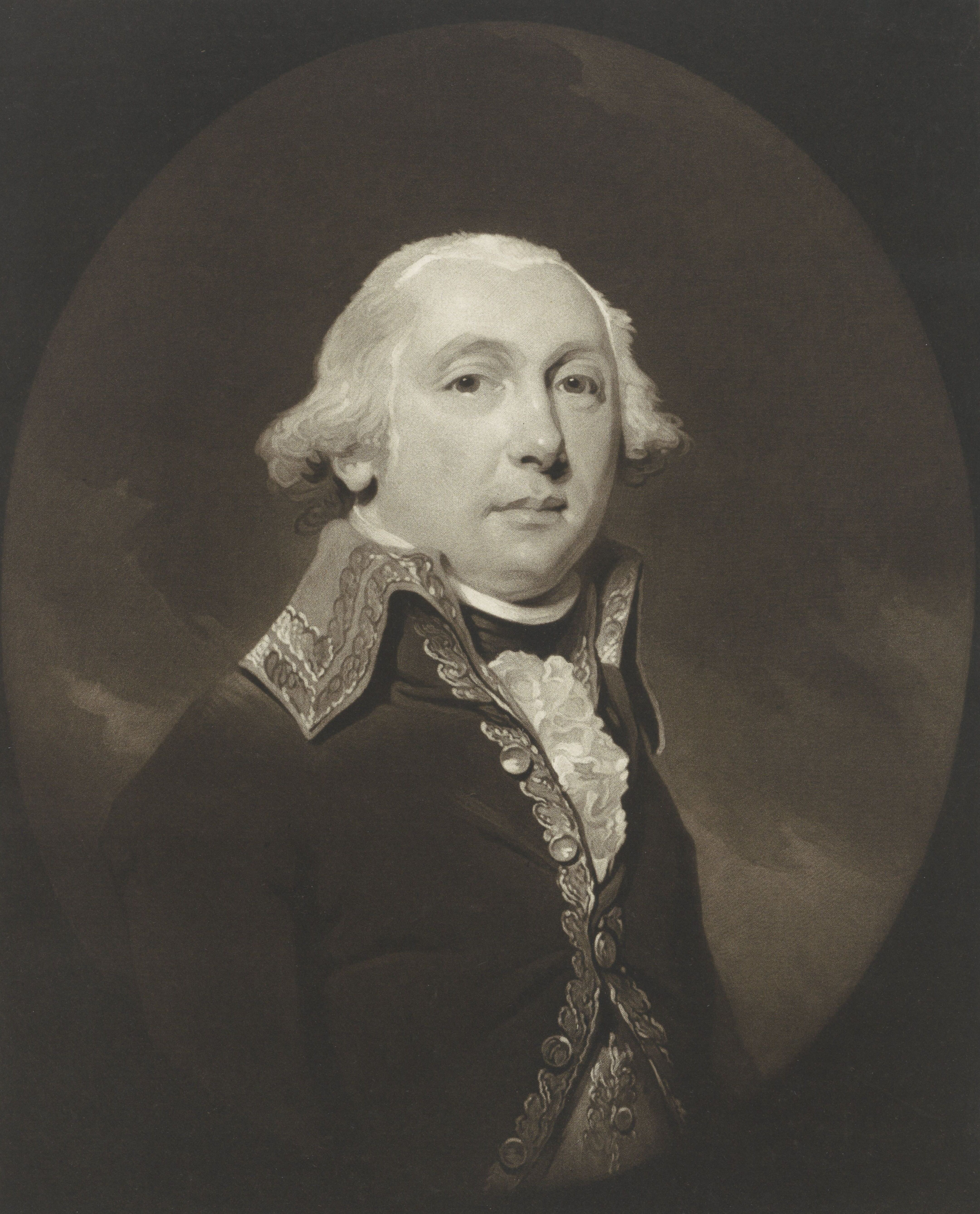
Vice-Admiral Jan Willem de Winter, commander-in-chief of the Batavian fleet

Mutiny was not only a problem for the Batavian navy. In April and May 1797 (barely a half year after the mutiny at Saldanha Bay) the British fleet mutinied at Spithead and Nore. In both cases, politically motivated unrest was behind the mutinies. In the Dutch case, it was the adherents of the conservative, even reactionary, ideology of Organism, who proved to be unreliable. In the British case, on the other hand, the initiative for the mutinies came from the partisans of the ideas of the French Revolution. Those ideas also inspired revolutionaries in Ireland, who already in 1796 appealed to the French Directory to support a revolution in Ireland. This idea appealed to the French, because they saw Ireland as the strategic backdoor to Great Britain. This resulted in the failed expedition to Ireland at the end of 1796. After this defeat the French did not give up, but started planning for an even more grandiose enterprise, that would consist of a two-pronged invasion of Ireland. The southern prong would take a Franco-Spanish fleet to the South of Ireland, while the northern prong would have the Batavian fleet convoy a fleet of transports with 25,000 French troops (conveniently located in the Batavian Republic as the French army of occupation) aboard around the north of Scotland, toward Northern Ireland. The battle of Cape St. Vincent in February 1797 knocked the Spanish fleet out of the race, and the victory of the French royalists in the April 1797 French elections temporarily cooled the ardor of the radicals in the Directory. However, their radical colleagues in the Batavian Commission on Foreign Affairs of the National Assembly (Note: A secretive standing committee of the National Assembly, that had managed to subordinate the sister-committees on Naval Affairs and Alliance and Army Affairs to itself on the pretext that the "leaking" of state secrets to enemy (Great Britain) and ally (France; this was seen as even worse) by those committees had become intolerable. The Commission consisted of selected members of the three committees, that together usurped the foreign-policy-making powers of the National Assembly; de Jonge, pp.284-287) were still keen to show their dedication to the revolutionary cause (and incidentally prove to the French Directory that an independent Batavian Republic was worth supporting). So the "northern" prong of the planned invasion in Ireland was kept alive, with the 25,000 French troops replaced with 15,000 troops from the Batavian army under command of the Batavian revolutionary hero, Lt.-General Herman Willem Daendels. These troops were embarked in a fleet of transports, lying in the Texel roadstead, in June. They spent the summer of 1797 in steadily increasing misery aboard the ships, while the Batavian fleet was kept in the roadstead by the seasonal westerly winds, which prevented it from sailing out. In this frustrating time interval the Channel squadron of Admiral Adam Duncan became operational again after the spring mutinies; Great Britain amassed an army of 80,000 troops in Ireland; General Lazare Hoche, the great promoter of the plan for the invasion died; and the Irish revolutionary Wolfe Tone, who spent the summer aboard Vrijheid, Admiral de Winter's flagship, lost heart. The Commission on Foreign Affairs, therefore, decided to cancel the operation at the end of the summer, and ordered the debarkation of the troops on 9 September 1797.

=== The Battle of Camperdown and its aftermath ===
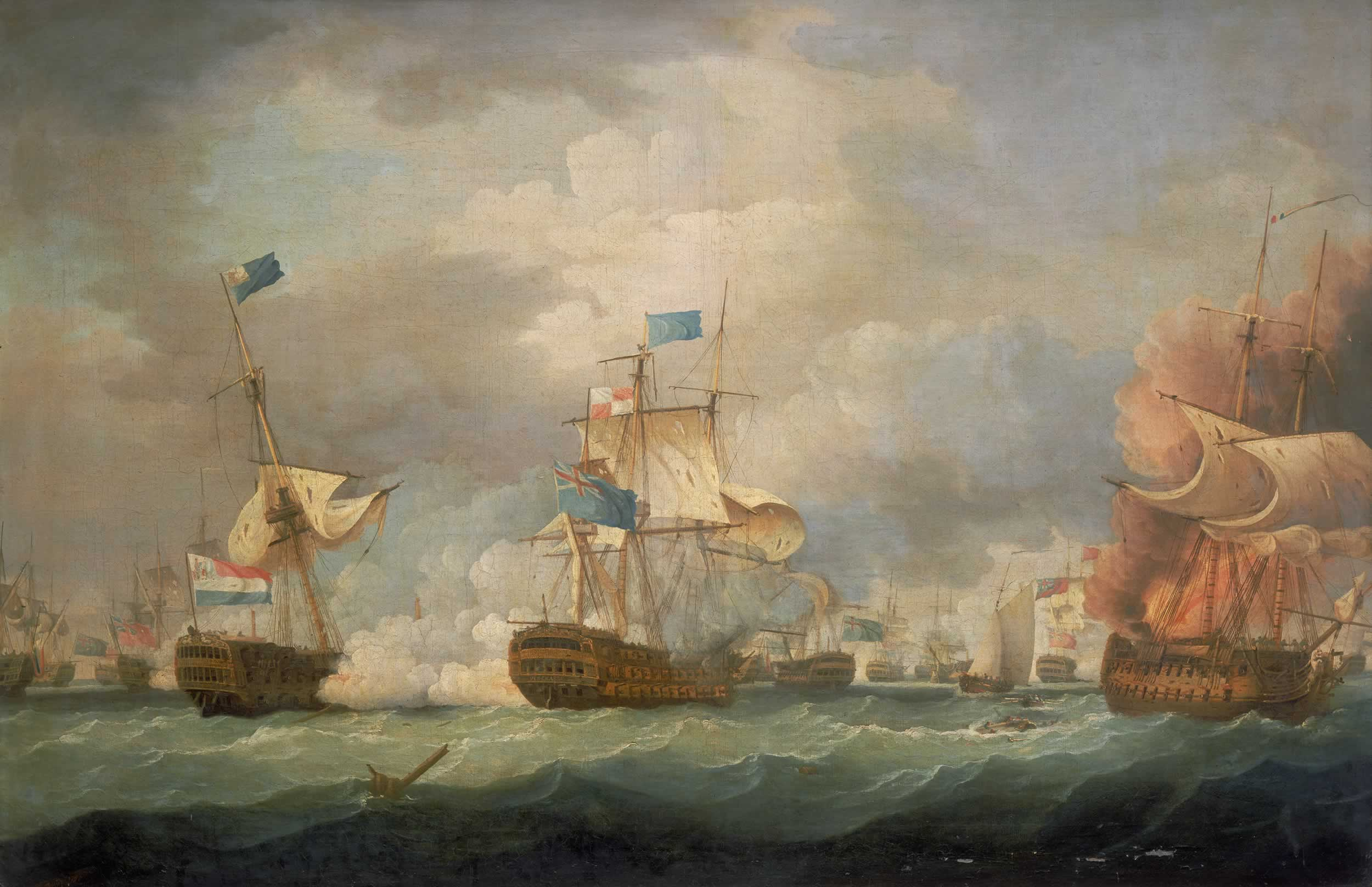
The Battle of Camperdown, 11 October 1797, Thomas Whitcombe

Five day earlier the Coup of 18 Fructidor took place in France, once again putting the radicals in the Directory in charge. For their allies in the Batavian Commission on Foreign Affairs this was an extra motivation to have the fleet in the Texel "do something, anything" to promote the cause of Revolution and harm the cause of Reaction, and to erase the shame of Saldanha Bay. The plan this time was to have the fleet in the Texel make a sortie with the objective of freeing the ship of the line Kortenaer, that (together with the frigate Scipio) was blockaded in the roadstead of Hellevoetsluis by a British flotilla, and possibly surprising that flotilla. This should be an easy victory that would stimulate national morale in the Batavian Republic no end. Waxing even more ambitious, the Commission (repeating the secret instructions it had given him on 9 July) ordered Admiral de Winter to accept battle from even stronger British forces, as long as they were not obviously superior (an order that would have disastrous consequences). De Winter was understandably very dubious about this rash command, but when the Commission waved away his objections, (Note: Those objections did not number suspicion about the reliability of his crews among them, as the British historian Padfield has speculated (Padfield, Peter (2000), Nelson's War. Wordsworth Military Library. ISBN 1-84022-225-5, p. 97), as the correspondence with the Commission does not mention this. In any case, during the battle the crews proved fully reliable, individual cases of cowardice excepted; this time mutiny did not play a role.) he started to make serious preparations to execute it. But again, adverse winds prevented the immediate sailing of his fleet of sixteen ships of the line and ten frigates and brigs. This prompted an acrimonious exchange of express-letters between the Commission and the Admiral, in which the Commission ordered the admiral ever more stringently to stop dallying and get out to sea. This exchange proved very embarrassing to the Commission when the political Opposition in the National Assembly got hold of them after the battle.

The obstructing westerly winds finally abated and at 9:30 am (Note: Dutch time, which was one hour later than English time, as it is nowadays.) on October 7, 1797 (Note: And not on October 8, as some British historians apparently have it; de Jonge is quite insistent on this, as this fact plays a role in the later quarrel about when the final peremptory order of the Commission reached de Winter; de Jonge, pp. 307-309) the fleet weighed anchor and left the Texel anchorage. De Winter plotted a course for the Meuse estuary in the expectation that his order to the commander of Kortenaer to leave his anchorage would be obeyed, but adverse winds again prevented this. The fleet, therefore, spent the next few days cruising up and down that area of the Dutch coast and futilely chasing the squadron of captain Henry Trollope that was observing him from a tantalizingly close distance. The Batavian ships were too slow, (Note: The slowness of Dutch capital ships was a well-known problem, due to the fact that the constraints on draft of ships, imposed by the shallowness of Dutch coastal and inland waters, prevented Dutch ship constructors from making their ships as hydrodynamically agile as ships of other navies, blessed with no such constraints. Because the Dutch still needed big ships, they were forced to make them broad and flat-bottomed, and this caused a speed penalty. The problem was not fully understood during the 18th century, as hydrodynamics was not yet fully developed, and this resulted in much acrimony between shipbuilders and navy officers. Dutch Admiral Cornelis Schrijver, when still a captain, complained loud and often about the problem in the 1720s, which caused the Admiralty of Amsterdam to import British shipwrights to lead the Amsterdam admiralty shipyard, in hopes that they would possess the secret of the faster British ships (which did not turn out to be the case; they faced the same constraints as their Dutch colleagues). The controversy (after decades of festering) burst into the open in the 1750s when Schrijver (then a lt.-admiral) accused the Dutch shipwrights of incompetence in a pamphlet, which elicited a public polemic with a number of shipwrights of other admiralty shipyards, who finally opened up about their design practices, which they had considered proprietary information up to then. It turned out that the Dutch shipwrights were not as technically backward as Schrijver (and many later historians, on his authority) have asserted. The whole controversy was described in Hoving A.J., and A.A. Lemmers, In tekening gebracht. De achttiende-eeuwse scheepsbouwers en hun ontwerpmethoden(Bataafse Leeuw 2001), pp.13-21) however.

Meanwhile, Duncan was re-victualing in Yarmouth with his fleet of about equal strength, but he soon returned to the Texel in the expectation that de Winter would not be too far away. In the morning of October 11 the two fleets discovered each other on the latitude of the village of Camperduin on the Dutch coast. The wind was NW and the weather blustery. Duncan had the weather gage which gave him a distinct tactical advantage. De Winter decided that in view of his instructions from the Commission he had to accept battle and at 9 am (Note: English time; all times henceforth converted to English time.) hoisted signal No. 655 of the Dutch General Signal book: come to line of battle, close-hauled on the port tack, behind your assigned predecessors. Due to the limitations of square-rigged ships, which generally could not get closer to the wind than under an angle of 70 degrees with the wind direction, this worked out as a compass course of NE. The Batavian fleet had been sailing with "short sail" in three divisions: the future vanguard under Rear-Admiral Bloys van Treslong in Brutus to windward; the center division under Rear-Admiral Samuel Story in Staten Generaal, including the flagship Vrijheid of Vice-Admiral de Winter himself, in the middle; and the future rearguard under Vice-Admiral Reintjes (Note: Together with Rear-Admiral Frederik Alexander Meurer. Reintjes had suffered a stroke shortly before the fleet sailed, and was assigned Meurer as an "assistant", because he was clearly unfit for command; de Jonge, p.330) in Jupiter to leeward. De Winter had issued a directive about the order of battle, giving the sequence in which the ships were supposed to form the line of battle, on 6 July. But he issued a slightly different directive on 17 July, just for the case the fleet would be attacked while exiting the roadstead of Texel, and had to form the line of battle then. This nuance had not been adequately communicated by his staff, and this caused Rear-Admiral Bloys van Treslong to assume that the directive of 17 July was in force, while de Winter intended the directive of 6 July. Though the rest of the van assumed the correct positions, Brutus and Tjerk Hiddes held back, and assumed positions behind Vrijheid in the center division. De Winter ordered Tjerk Hiddes forward to the back of the van, but he somehow omitted to do this for Brutus. The consequence of this error was that the vanguard missed both a flag officer to lead it, and a strong ship of the line. De Winter later asserted that this was one of the main reasons why he lost the battle. Likewise, the order of battle of the rearguard differed from the intended one, as Delft (which ship had been sent to investigate a number of sails to leeward, and therefore had difficulty rejoining the fleet in time) was directed by Admiral Reintjes to take up the last position in the line. The strength of the rearguard was thereby weakened, in the opinion of the commander of Delft, and many others, as this ship was one of the two most-lightly armed of the Batavian ships. Finally, two of the ships: Wassenaar and Haarlem, were notoriously onbezeild (difficult to handle, due to a bad trim), and therefore had difficulty maintaining their position in the line. This caused two "gaps" in the line, in front of both ships mentioned, which de Winter tried to correct, but not in time. These gaps were later exploited by the British fleet.

Meanwhile, Admiral Duncan apparently had some difficulties with his own battle formation. But he had the luxury of having the weather gage, which allowed his ships to approach the Batavian line of battle before the wind, and to select more or less freely where they would engage that line, so the fact that the British fleet did not form a nice, evenly spaced, line-abreast formation, but was eventually divided into two ragged divisions, one of nine ships total, under Rear-Admiral Onslow in HMS Monarch, to windward of the British formation, and one consisting of the remaining British ships under Admiral Duncan, in HMS Venerable, to the British lee, made no real difference to the outcome of the battle. (Note: Tactical maneuvering at the time was "routine" for naval officers, who studied tactical manuals, like the Dutch Admiral Van Kinsbergen's Grondbeginselen der zee-tacticq (1782) (Principles of Naval Tactics) in which all kinds of tactical situations were "gamed out" in exhausting detail, with prescriptions on what formations to adopt, what courses to steer, and what signals to hoist. The most junior naval lieutenant should at least in theory be able to plan a battle according to these lines, as he would have had to pass an examination before receiving his commission. Presumably, de Winter followed these strictures to the letter.) Onslow fell onto the Batavian rearguard, apparently aiming for Admiral Reintjes' flag in Jupiter, as he went through the gap between Jupiter and Haarlem, thereby "breaching" the Batavian line-of-battle. This enabled him to luff up to leeward of Jupiter and engage that ship from a position that Reintjes had difficulty covering, as his leeward battery could not be brought to bear. Jupiter therefore had to bear away to lee, widening the break in the Batavian line. According to the experts in the naval court martial that was held after the battle this already was the moment on which the battle was lost for de Winter, as from this time on his line of battle started to unravel, leading to a melee, which the line of battle, as a tactical formation was designed to prevent. (Note: One may compare the line-of-battle with a line of bunkers in a defensive military formation on land, in which each bunker is able to give supporting fire to its neighbors. As long as the line remained closed-up, the enemy would normally not be able to cross to leeward, as the line would form an unbreachable "wall", while going around an end should not be possible, as the line of ships should be moving at the same speed as the enemy ships, so those enemy ships should not be able to come up from behind and overtake the respective ships in the line of battle, but be left in their wake. However, in this case the Batavian ships were sailing under "short sail" (i.e with only their topsails, and not their courses, topgallant sails and royals deployed; Cf. Hourigan, P.W., Manual of Seamanship for the Officer of the Deck : Ship Under Sail Alone (1903), p. 82). No doubt, de Winter had made this disposition to make the ships more manageable, and let them heel less. But the consequence was, that the Batavian ships were sailing more slowly than the British ones, enabling the latter to overtake them on their parallel courses, as is reported time and again in accounts of the battle. In theory, the Batavian ships could have speeded up, by setting more sail, but once the battle had started, this would be more difficult. Imagine doing this while the enemy is pouring broadsides of shrapnel through the rigging.)

De Winter's giving his sword to Duncan aboard HMS Venerable

Because in a melee the enemy could deal with each ship at his leisure, creating "local superiority of forces" by surrounding the victims with two or more ships, and overwhelming them with broadsides from all sides. This is what happened time and again in the remainder of the battle, and the fact that Duncan in HMS Venerable repeated the breach of the line of battle through the gap between Staten General and Wassenaar a quarter of an hour later, is mere detail. We can dispense with the tales of the individual duels, except for that between Vrijheid and a number of British ships, among which HMS Ardent and HMS Venerable, as in a way it was emblematic for the stoic heroism displayed on both sides. After Venerable had driven Staten General out of the line of battle with the same tactic HMS Monarch earlier used against Jupiter, she engaged Vrijheid on her leeward, while that ship at the same time was engaged with HMS Ardent on her windward. There may have been one other British ship involved. De Winter, being in the minority, tried to signal the remainder of the center division (Brutus, Leyden and Mars) under Rear-Admiral Bloys van Treslong, to come to his aid, but his signal-rigging was shot away repeatedly While the four ships were busy firing at each other, with much loss of life, but no decisive effect, they suddenly encountered the flaming wreck of the Batavian ship Hercules (which had earlier been set on fire by a carronade salvo of HMS Triumph). As this posed a mortal danger for all ships in its neighborhood, Vrijheid was able to use the temporary "truce" that all were forced to observe to break off the fight, bear away to leeward, jibe, and sail back along the line with the intent to take up a new position behind Mars. However, he encountered HMS Director (captain Bligh) who came barreling down to her from windward; gave her a devastating broadside, which shot down both the foremast and main mast of Vrijheid; jibed behind her, came up on her other side, and shot down the mizzen also. Thus completely dismasted, Vrijheid endured the broadsides from Director and other ships, among whom also Venerable, who had followed Vrijheid, for another half hour, before her batteries were silenced. De Winter was brought from Vrijheid to HMS Venerable, on whose quarterdeck he offered his sword to Duncan. According to legend Duncan refused to accept it in a gesture of respect and gallantry.

This ended the battle. Rear-Admiral Story in Staten General, who had only briefly participated in the battle, when Venerable forced him to bear away remained a safe distance away to leeward, where he kept cruising while other stragglers from the battle, and the frigates and other smaller ships, that had maintained a parallel course to leeward of the main line of battle, joined his flag. In this way he saved about half of de Winter's fleet. The Batavian navy lost nine of the sixteen ships of the line, and one frigate. (Note: The frigate Monnikendam, which bravely, though imprudently, had attacked HMS Monarch when that ship breached the line of battle. Some British historians claim that the frigate Embuscade was made a British prize, but subsequently, in a similar manner as Monnikendam, was lost on the coast of Walcheren during the storm that followed the battle. However, de Jonge claims that this ship entered the Texel roadstead safely, together with the other ships in Story's makeshift squadron, in the morning of 12 October, according to his sources. Cf. de Jonge, p. 356, note 2. It may also be noted that Embuscade was present in 1799 at the Vlieter surrender.) The losses could have been even larger if Duncan had pursued Story's ragtag fleet-remnant, but Duncan declared in his dispatch to the Secretary of the Admiralty of 13 October 1797 that he felt that he was getting too close to the Dutch shore and shallows to safely do this. The losses on both sides were relatively heavy. British historians are able to give a rather precise number of British casualties, but the numbers of casualties on the Batavian side are imprecise. De Jonge says that those losses amounted to 1200 casualties in total, of which 400 immediately killed, and 600 wounded, on the captured ships alone. Among the casualties were Vice-Admiral Reintjes (died in captivity), and Rear-Admiral Bloys van Treslong (lost an arm), and several of the captains of the ships. Among the officers made prisoner of war were, beside de Winter himself, cdr. Holland of Wassenaar (who like de Winter survived, though the British historian William James declared them both dead) and Rear-Admiral Meurer, and the captains of Delft, Alkmaar, and Gelijkheid who were all treated very gallantly by the British. They had earned the respect of the British, as James remarks

Upon the whole, the shattered hulls and blood-besmeared decks of the prizes, and the almost equally damaged appearance of the principally engaged ships among those that had taken them, gave decided proofs, that, although it had lain by so long, "Batavian prowess" still claimed the respect of an enemy and the admiration of the world.

"Respect of the enemy" and "admiration of the world" were, however, cold comfort to the members of Commission on Foreign Affairs (though they certainly craved those encomiums), who now faced the wrath of the "radical" opposition in the National Assembly, who painted the defeat as the direct result of the chaos "eating away at the heart of the government". Certainly, even objective observers, like de Jonge, fifty years later, blame primarily the rashness of the Commission in forcing de Winter's hand for the debacle. Nevertheless, the National Assembly, after lively debate, accepted the explanation of the Commission. So the focus of the Batavian public's demand for Answers became de Winter and his officers. All were initially hailed as Heroes, especially de Winter, but inevitably more critical questions were eventually raised, prompting the admiral after his return from captivity in 1798 (he and his officers were let go on giving their paroles) to demand that a Hoge Zeekrijgsraad judge his, and his officers', conduct before, during and after the battle. The ensuing controversy, with the finger pointing and acrimony between the admiral, and most of his officers, did almost as much damage to the Batavian officer corps, as the battle itself had done. De Winter felt "betrayed" by especially Rear-Admiral Bloys van Treslong, but also by Rear-Admiral Story and the combination Vice-Admiral Reintjes/Rear-Admiral Meurer (not to speak of the captains who had really acted in a cowardly way, like cdrs. Souter of Batavier and Jacobsson of Cerberus). De Winter was himself acquitted of dereliction of duty (but only with a 4-3 majority), and Bloys van Treslong and Meurer convicted. So of the flag officers who had started in the battle only Story remained in a position to lead the Batavian navy (de Winter could no longer serve, as he was considered a "not-exchanged" prisoner of war, who had given his word not to fight against Great Britain "for the duration of the war"). (Note: De Winter was released from his parole under art. IX of the Convention of Alkmaar in 1799 and declared to be "exchanged"; cf. de Jonge, p. 507)

=== Surrender in the Vlieter ===
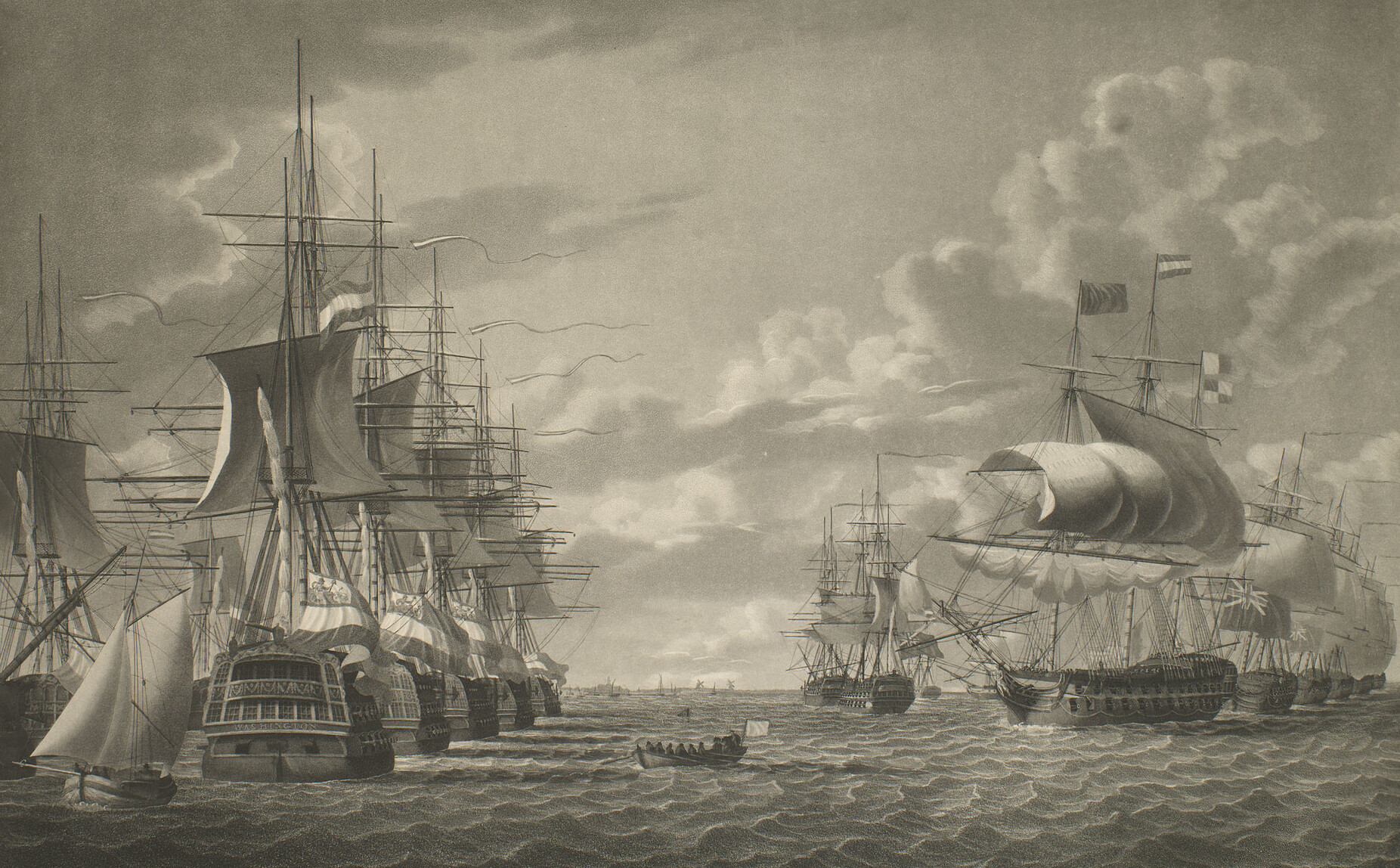
1800 illustration of the Vlieter incident by Robert Dodd

The National Assembly, and the French Directorate, felt that the losses of Camperdown needed to be made good as soon as possible. This necessitated a fresh dose of "extraordinary taxation". The Committee on Finance of the National Assembly, therefore, proposed an eight percent tax on income, based on a sliding scale, and starting with annual incomes over 300 guilders, in November 1797. This was a complete novelty, as this was to be a national tax, whereas heretofore all taxes were apportioned and levied at the provincial level. This novelty was only possible because the defeat at Camperdown had caused a "national emergency". This proposal was as gasoline on the already raging fire of the fight between Unitarists and Federalists for the soul of the Batavian Republic. The tax was adopted on 2 December 1797, but the fight exacerbated the already strained relations between "radicals" and "conservatives", which eventually led to the Coup of 21–22 January 1798.

The Committee for Naval Affairs took the necessary steps to rebuild the navy. The ships that had returned to the Texel were repaired; two coastal-defense guard ships were converted to ships of the line; the new ships that were still in the stocks were ordered to be expeditiously finished; the construction of four new ships of the line of 68 guns was ordered; and three new frigates started. Early in the Spring of 1798 two ships of the line of 76 guns, seven of 68 guns, two of 56 guns, and two razees of 44 guns, six frigates of 22 to 36 guns, and four brigs of 16 to 18 guns were operational. And in the course of 1798 several more ships of the line were launched.

Despite these good results, after the Coup of January 1798 the new Uitvoerend Bewind (Executive Authority) decided to replace the Committee for Naval Affairs (like all standing committees of the National Assembly) with a so-called Agent for the Navy (like other Agents were appointed to lead other government departments), with which the organizational structure of a government department under a Minister was for the first time introduced for the Dutch navy (as this structure was retained under later regime changes). The first Agent was Jacobus Spoors, who was, however, very reluctant to assume the new office.

The first task for the new fleet would be the support of General Napoleon Bonaparte's project of an invasion of England in 1798. However, the general had other ambitions. He decided to give priority to his invasion of Egypt, and so the Batavian navy spent a lot of money and effort in vain on a project that did not go ahead. Similar projects: another planned invasion of Ireland in early 1799, and when that plan was cancelled, an expedition to the Dutch East Indies with the same ships and troops, were also cancelled by early 1799.

But then rumors of an impending Anglo-Russian invasion of the Batavian Republic began to circulate. This convinced the Uitvoerend Bewind that any foreign adventures had to be abandoned until this danger had been averted. The rumors eventually proved to be more than rumors, and the invasion took place in August of 1799, beginning with the British amphibious landing at Callantsoog, covered by a British fleet under Admiral Andrew Mitchell.

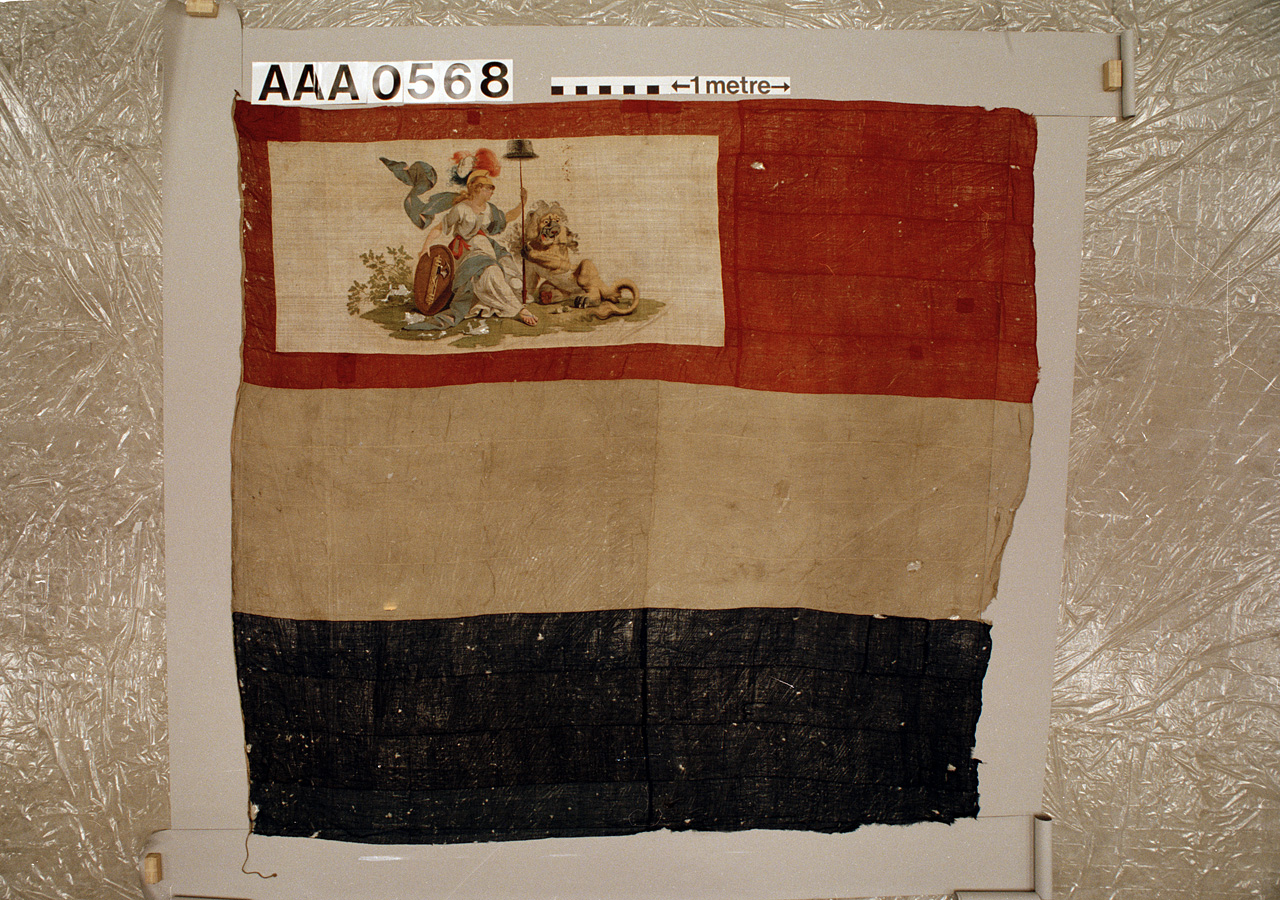
Ensign of a Batavian warship captured during the Vlieter incident

Unbeknownst to the Batavians, Admiral Mitchell had a "secret weapon" on board his flagship, in the person of the Erfprins (Hereditary Prince of Orange (Note: The courtesy title Erfprins (Erbprinz in German) is customarily used for the presumptive heir to the title of a Fürst, or Prince of the Holy Roman Empire, which the Prince of Orange technically was, as the Principality of Orange, to which the name refers, was originally a fief of that empire. One might compare the title to that of "crown prince", but then for non-royal noble families. The title is commonly used in the historiography of the era, to distinguish the son from the father, to avoid confusion; the father was nominally the Captain-General of the Dutch States Army during the Flanders Campaign, but his son, the Erfprins was commander-in-chief of the Dutch field army that conducted operations during that campaign. In this particular period the Erfprins was emphatically not the Prince of Orange, a misunderstanding that may arise, because after 1815 the title "Prince of Orange" was given as a courtesy title to the Crown Prince of the Kingdom of the Netherlands. Another common misunderstanding is that the Erfprins is called this, because he was to inherit the Stadtholderate, which at this time indeed had become hereditary in the House of Orange. However, the title of Prince, and the office of stadtholder formally should be seen as completely unconnected.)), the future King William I of the Netherlands and eldest son of the Stadtholder William V. This "Serene Highness", though a former general commanding troops in battle, at this point in time was no more than an émigré, who had joined forces with the British government of Foreign Secretary William Grenville. Grenville in his turn had high hopes of an easy military victory, as he expected the Dutch populace to reject the ideological trappings of the French-imposed Batavian authorities. Though a Foxite himself, and so relatively enlightened, Grenville was very conservative, in the mold of Irish statesman Edmund Burke, compared to the politicians in the Batavian Republic. The Erfprins and he felt a certain philosophical and political affinity, which made him believe that that person would be a reliable manager of national interests in the Netherlands when "normalcy" (in the sense of the Act of Guarantee and Triple Alliance) would have been restored in that country. Grenville expected the Dutch populace to share his distaste for the "revolutionary evils" that had befallen the Netherlands since 1795, and he thought that, given the chance, the soldiers and sailors of the Batavian armed forces would go over to the forces of the Coalition to the last man, and the population would erupt into armed insurrection, as soon as the Orange standard had been raised.

But there was more than just this ideological predilection. Orangist secret agents, like Charles Bentinck, had brought tales of disaffection under the Dutch population, that tended to confirm what Grenville already believed, and thus reinforce Grenville's optimism. There were also stories about the weakness of the defending forces (that later proved incorrect), and of the unreliability of those forces, like the National Guard, and of course, the navy. It was therefore with some confidence that the Secretary for War Henry Dundas could instruct General Ralph Abercromby, the officer commanding the army forces in the invasion in a letter dated 5 August 1799, not only on the military, but also on the political approach he was to take after he had made his landing, and he was encouraged to make use of the services of the supporters of the "antient constitution"(sic), wherever he could find them. To set these political effects in motion, the general was to promulgate a Proclamation, that had been issued for the occasion by the Erfprins in the name of his father, which in peremptory terms commanded the Dutch people to rally to the cause of the House of Orange. Dundas had counselled the Prince to sweeten his tone with some conciliatory language, and hints at reform, but in his arrogance the Prince opted for clear language, which only served to alienate the population, as soon turned out.

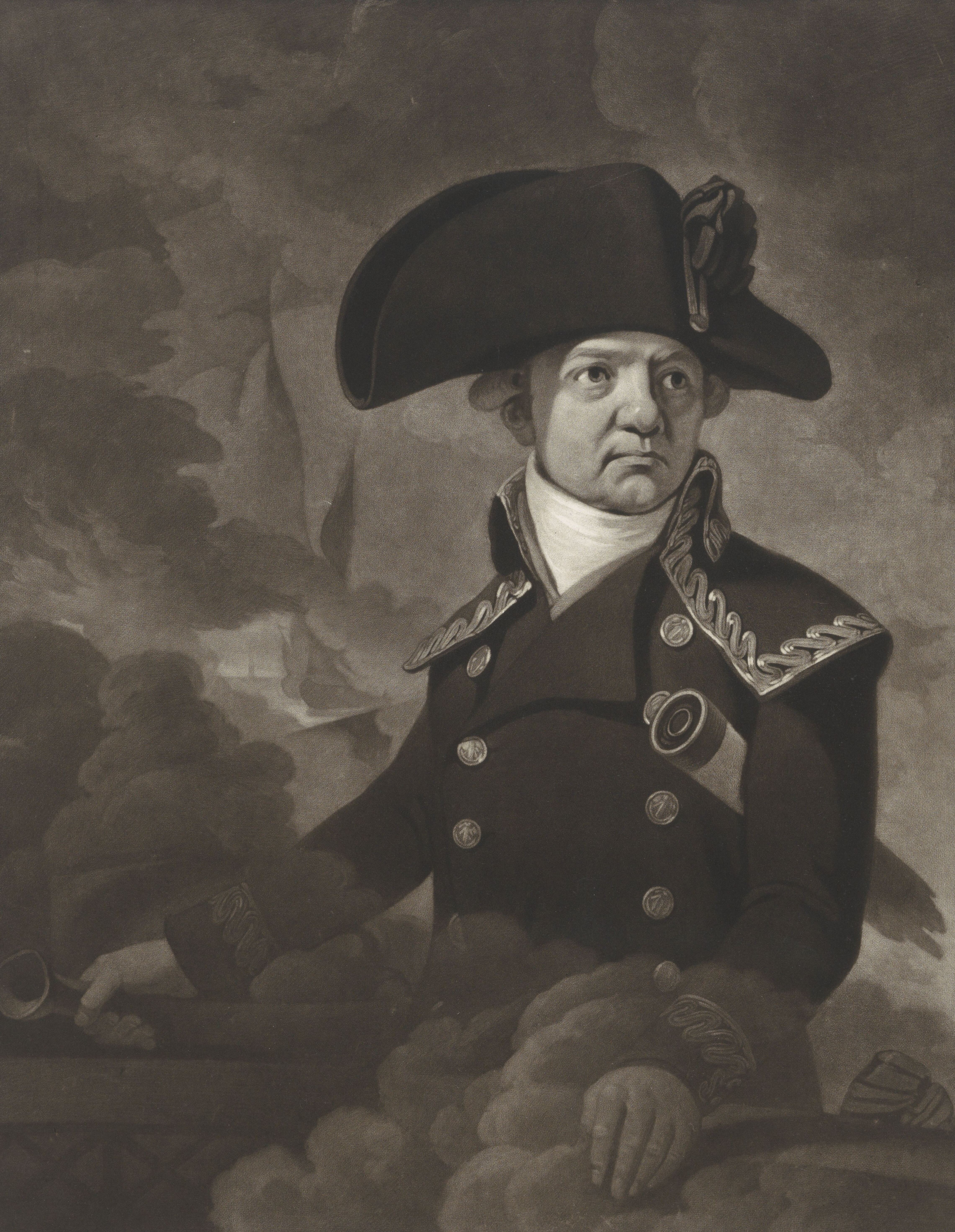
Portrait of Samuel Story

As far as the Batavian fleet in the Texel roadstead was concerned, Orangist agents actively suborned a number of naval officers in that fleet, like Aegidius van Braam and Theodorus Frederik van Capellen, respectively the captain of Leyden and Rear-Admiral Story's flag captain on Washington (Note: This ship of the line was launched in 1795 as Staten Generaal, but was renamed Washington in 1798 after the former U.S. president, who was greatly admired by the Patriot faction in the Batavian Republic, but abhorred by the Orangist faction, for exactly that reason. No doubt, the renaming was also expected to show the political sympathies of the Dutch; de Jonge, p. 237, note 1) who were among the officers from the old navy, who had been let go in 1795, but had been recommissioned after Camperdown to fill the many vacancies in the officer corps. They frequently appear in the correspondence of secret agent Charles Bentinck about Batavian officers he deemed pro-Orangist, and willing and able to lead a mutiny in the fleet.

It is against this background that we need to see the series of events around the squadron of Rear-Admiral Story, consisting of the ships of the line Washington (cap. Van Capellen), Leyden (cap. Van Braam), Cerberus (cap.de Jong), Utrecht (cap. Kolff), de Ruyter (cap. Huys), Gelderland (cdr. Waldeck), Beschermer (cap. Eylbracht), and Batavier (cap. Van Senden); the frigates Amphitre (cdr. Schutter), Mars (cdr. Bock), Embuscade (cdr. Rivert), and the brig Galathee (lt. Droop) that started with the arrival of the British fleet before the Texel on 19 August, and was followed by the visit of three parlimentaires, col. Frederick Maitland, cap. Robert Winthrop, and Lieutenant George Collier, to Admiral Story aboard Washington on 21 August. They were sent by General Abercromby and Admiral Duncan to demand that Story and his squadron "come over" to the Erfprins, in which case they would be able to sail out to the British fleet unmolested and join that fleet.

The visit was certainly irregular, in the sense that the pilot boat in which the parlimentaires traveled was allowed to pass the guard line, maintained by Amphitre and Embuscade, without warning Story, and they boarded Washington without his permission. This misplaced leniency was later held against Story at his court-martial, because it allowed the parlimentaires to spy out the strengths and weaknesses of the fleet, and even contact members of crews. The latter was allowed to happen when the parlimentaires had to wait for the arrival of the officer commanding the shore batteries at Den Helder, col. Gilquin, who Maitland wanted to hand the ultimatum to in person. Cap. Van Capellen even accompanied them on board Washington, allowed them to address members of the crew, and to hand out copies in both English and Dutch of the proclamation of Abercromby and the Erfprins. In this way the crew of the Washington (and probably also Embuscade) received knowledge of the approach of the British fleet, with the Erfprins on board, and also of the coming Anglo-Russian invasion of Holland. This information appears to have made a profound impression on the crew of Washington (and other ships), especially as "agitation" already appears to have been going on. Story might have stopped the rot by kicking the parlimentaires of his ship for this "unparlimentairy" conduct, and by punishing Capt. Van Capellen, but he did nothing. (Note: It is not known what was exactly said in the interview between the British parlimentaires and Story, van Braam, van Capellen and de Jong, but from the note sent by col. Maitland to Secretary Dundas on 9 September 1799, describing the event, it may be inferred that the three captains in so many words "...did declare their attachment to the Stadtholder and the former government, and their disgust at the present government and their French connection." Maitland then emphasizes that this fact should be kept secret in order not to endanger the relatives of the three captains, indicating that their behavior might be construed as being treasonous. Cf. Colenbrander, pp. 393-394. Apparently, secrecy was indeed maintained, as de Jonge does not mention this incriminating note.)

Story and Gilquin limited themselves to rejecting the ultimatum. The landing at Callantsoog started on 23 August, and eventually the defending Batavian troops under General Daendels were defeated, which prompted the latter to over-hastily order the strategic retreat of the troops manning the shore batteries at Den Helder (of course after spiking the guns). Those batteries had recently been augmented to about 80 heavy pieces of artillery, that together with the artillery on the fleet in the roadstead, should have been adequate to defend the anchorage from a naval incursion.

Four days before the British landing the Agent for the Navy, Spoors, had sent Story an order, allowing him to retreat to the nearby anchorage of the Vlieter (a tidal trench between sandbanks near what is in our days the western end of the Afsluitdijk), in case the anchorage would have become indefensible, but he had retracted that order a few days later, and ordered Story to defend against a naval incursion with the fleet in the Texel anchorage. However, Story later vehemently denied having received that second order. Seeing that the loss of the shore batteries had indeed made the Texel anchorage indefensible, Story now made the fateful decision to retreat to the Vlieter. The fleet left the Texel anchorage in the morning of 28 August, to make the short trip to the new anchorage, but because of the southerly wind, was forced to anchor before the trench, instead of inside it. Story later defended taking this unfavorable position (if he had anchored at the narrowest point of the channel, his position would have been far stronger), because he intended to return to the Texel anchorage as soon as the British transports would have entered that anchorage, to attack that fleet in a vulnerable state. But as the wind now turned north he could not execute this plan, so he decided to take up the position in the channel after all, where he had the fleet go into line of battle on 29 August.

Then the wind turned southwest in the morning of 30 August, enabling the British fleet to enter the Texel roadstead and to sail toward the Batavian fleet in the Vlieter, leaving Story no other options than to defend an unfavorable position, or to surrender. Meanwhile the crews on several of the ships had given indications of disaffection and disobedience, that did not yet amount to mutiny (except on Washington, where the crew had put unauthorized guards on the doors of the powder room in the night of 29 August, because rumors were circulating that the officers intended to blow up the ship), but were sufficiently serious to worry Story. However, he neglected to take steps to nip the impending mutiny in the bud, fearing that taking forceful action would only make matters worse (a standpoint shared by the other officers).

The British squadron under Admiral Mitchell aboard HMS Isis (with a "double prince's flag" on the main mast), that sailed toward the Vlieter consisted of eleven ships of the line, seven frigates, five corvettes, armed with 16 32-pdr carronades, and numerous smaller ships with heavy artillery. Even though it was just a part of the British fleet, its force was far superior to that of Story's fleet. To win time (as he later asserted) to restore order among his crews, Story now sent captains Van Capellen and de Jong as parlimentaires to Isis to warn that he intended to defend himself to the death, which probably would result in the total annihilation of the ships Mitchell had earlier said he hoped to acquire for his navy. This ambiguous message did not impress Mitchell, who countered with an ultimatum to hoist the Prince's flag, and surrender the fleet, or Mitchell's fleet would be ordered to engage. Mitchell gave Story an hour to weigh his options and make his decision.

Meanwhile, things had gotten out of hand on Washington. The crew stormed the quarterdeck, threatened the officers, declared that they would refuse orders to fight, and even started to throw ammunition overboard. Instead of repressing this mutiny, Story signaled the captains of the other ships aboard for a council of war. He told the assembled captains of the ongoing mutiny, and told them that he would be unable to make his ship take part in the fight. Many of the other captains then told of similar problems on their own ships, equally preventing their ships from taking part in the impending battle. The council of war therefore unanimously decided to surrender the fleet, making it clear that they did not hand it over, as Mitchell had demanded, but gave in to superior power, and considered themselves prisoners of war. The captains Van Capellen and de Jong were again sent out to convey the message to Admiral Mitchell.

At the news of the surrender the crews burst out in an orgy of joy and mayhem. Batavian flags were mutilated and trampled; known Patriot sympathizers molested (one was even thrown overboard from Embuscade), and generally the riots that had occurred at Saldanha Bay were repeated, until the British restored order. Mitchell took over the ships, had the prince's flag hoisted, and had the ships sailed over to England, mostly with their own crews and officers. Most of the crew members, being Scandinavian and German mercenaries, went into British service, as did some of the officers. Everybody the Batavian authorities could put their hands on (some officers returned voluntarily) were arrested and brought before a Hoge Zeekrijgsraad. Rear-Admiral Story and captains Van Braam and Van Capellen remained abroad. They were tried in absentia, just like Capt. Kolff, who managed to escape from prison. Most received severe sentences. Story was sentenced to death by decapitation; captains Van Braam, Van Capellen, and Kolff to death by firing squad. As they were outside the reach of Batavian justice, this amounted to perpetual banishment. Those still alive in 1813 were pardoned by the former Erfprins, future king William I in his capacity of "Sovereign Prince" of the Netherlands.

== Return to the Dutch Navy ==
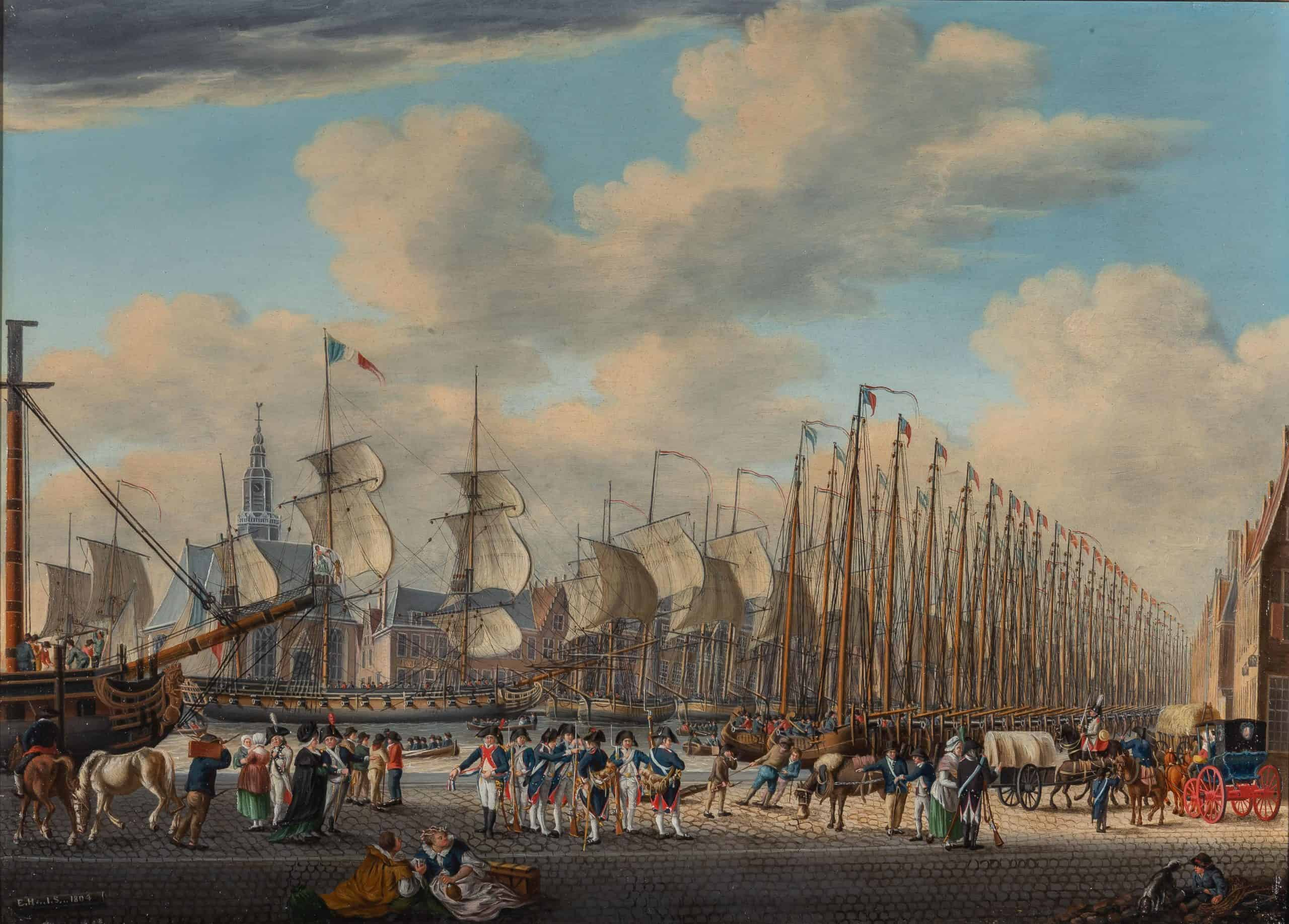
1804 painting of Batavian warships mustering in Vlissingen harbour

The expected general insurrection of the Dutch people failed to materialize; the British and Russian advances in North-Holland province were frustrated by the combined Franco-Batavian army; and seeing that the expedition was a failure the Coalition forces concluded the Convention of Alkmaar with the commander of the French troops in the Batavian Republic, General Guillaume Brune, that allowed them to evacuate under favorable conditions.

In the six years until the preliminaries of the Peace of Amiens brought hostilities to a halt, the Batavian navy lost no less than 64 ships to all kinds of calamities, among which 21 ships of the line, and 22 frigates, not exactly a good record, especially as eleven of the ships of the line were lost as a consequence of the two big mutinies referred to above.

In September 1801 another coup d'etat took place, executed by the French General Pierre Augereau. He intervened in one of the many quarrels between the Uitvoerend Bewind and the National Assembly to put an autocratic constitution in place, that rolled back the democratic gains of the previous years and replaced the Uitvoerend Bewind with a new Executive under the name Staatsbewind. As a byproduct, the Agent for the Navy was replaced by a Navy Council. (Note: This council consisted of H. Aeneae (who had been the chairman of the commission that wrote the report on the state of the navy in 1795), G.J. Jacobson (since 1795 commissioner of the Rotterdam department of the navy), and H. van Royen (a former member of the admiralty board of Zeeland); de Jonge, p.528, note 1) The Orangists were very happy with this development, as it enabled them to gain a foothold in the new regime (and they were in favor of the autocratic tenor of the new constitution).

The Peace of Amiens had a number of favorable consequences for the Republic and its navy (beside the fact that it now received diplomatic recognition from Great Britain and its allies). In the first place the stadtholder gave up his claims to reinstatement (in exchange for receiving some fiefs in Germany, where he now became a "sovereign prince"), thereby depriving the Orangists from their political rallying point; many now made their peace with the Staatsbewind regime; there would be no more Orangist-inspired mutinies on the Batavian fleet.

The many Dutch colonies captured by the British in the East and West Indies were returned to the Republic (without Ceylon, but including the Cape Colony), and the Batavian navy sent several squadrons to renew the Dutch control over these colonies, and garrison them. One, under now captain Bloys van Treslong went to Suriname; two others, one under Rear-Admiral Simon Dekker, the other under Vice-Admiral Pieter Hartsinck went to the Cape and onwards to Java.

The Batavian envoy to the Peace Conference, Rutger Jan Schimmelpenninck, attempted to have the ships that were surrendered in the Vlieter mutiny returned to the Batavian navy. Some of those ships had served under Dutch officers and crews in the Royal Navy, ferrying troops to Ireland, now that they were under the command of the stadtholder as "admiral-general" of the navy (though they had to swear allegiance to King George III as well). Those crews were now paid off (and allowed to return to the Netherlands under an amnesty), and the ships were laid up. Schimmelpenninck's efforts proved unsuccessful. According to British historian William James. they were eventually sold to the Royal Navy, with the proceeds going to the former stadtholder, William V.

=== Napoleon's planned invasion of England ===
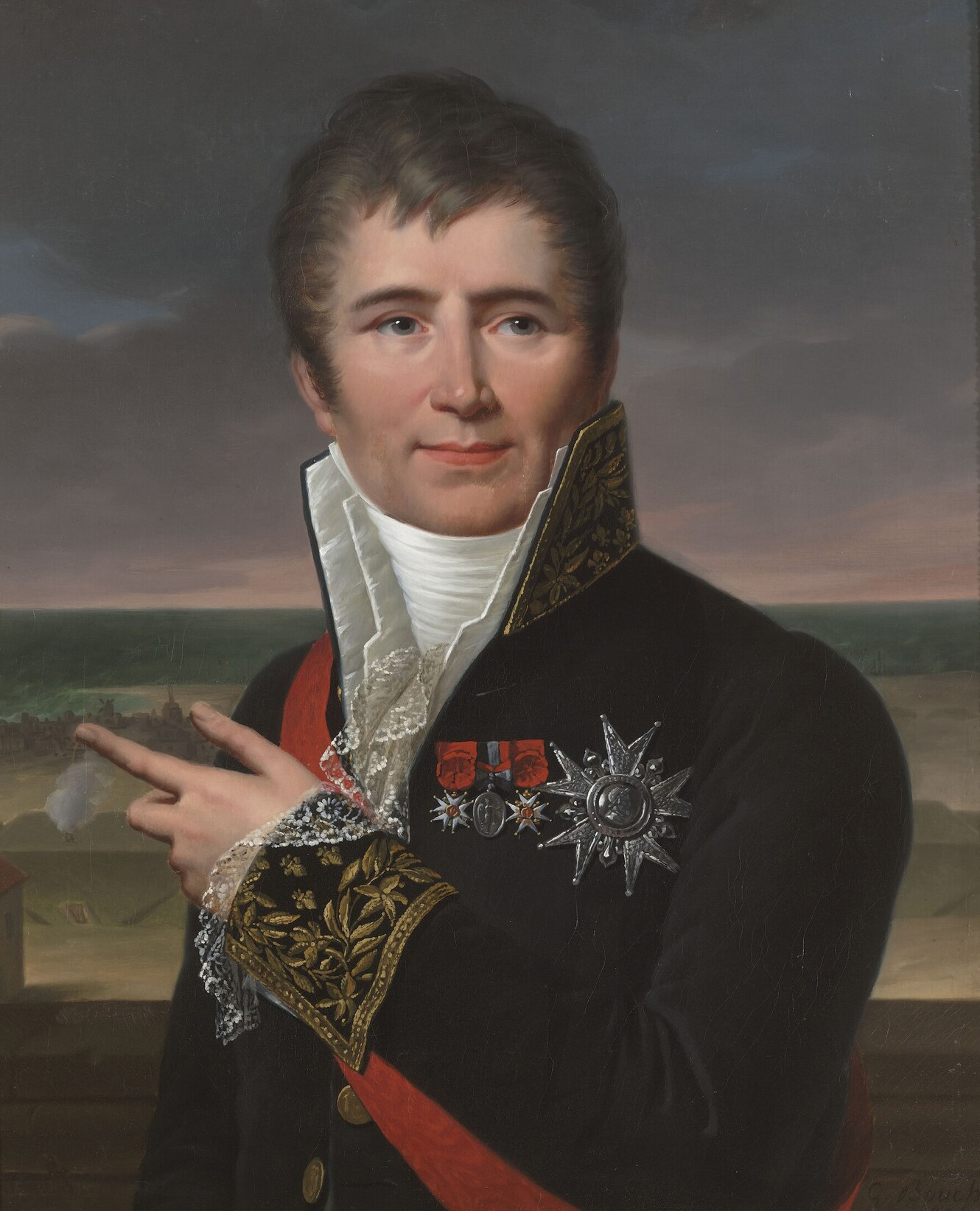
1824 portrait of Carel Hendrik Ver Huell

One of the Orangists who made their peace with the Batavian Republic was Carel Hendrik Ver Huell. He had been one of the old-navy officers dismissed in 1795 (as a commander), and had like many others refused to take up a new commission. He now, however, became involved with the preparations for the Dutch part of Napoleon's "Grand Scheme" of an invasion of Great Britain. The Staatsbewind made vain attempts not to become engaged in the new war, that broke out shortly after the Peace of Amiens had been concluded, but France showed no inclination to honor the part of the Peace that obligated her to withdraw her troops from the Batavian Republic, and so, willy-nilly, the Republic became once again a reluctant partner of the French republic in war. First Consul Napoleon Bonaparte imposed a new Convention (of 25 June 1803), supplemental to the treaty of alliance of 1795, on the Staatsbewind that included very onerous obligations, especially in the naval field. Specifically for the planned expedition (so in addition to already standing obligations) the Batavian navy was required to supply by December 1803: five ships of the line, (Note: These were Brutus (76), Joan de Witt (68), Doggersbank (68), Neptunus (68), and Hersteller (68); de Jonge, p. 537, note 1.) five frigates, 100 small gunboats, and 250 flat-bottomed transport craft, holding 60 to 80 men each. In total the Dutch were to provide 25,000 men and 2,500 horses, all vessels to be provisioned for 25 days from sailing time. (Note: The French text of the Convention of 25 June 1803 is published in Colenbrander, H.T. Gedenkstukken der Algemeene Geschiedenis van Nederland van 1795 tot 1840. Vierde deel, tweede stuk. Rijks Geschiedkundige Publicatien, Grote Serie, Vol 6 (1908), pp. 441-442.)

Verhuell (given the rank of rear-admiral for the occasion) was appointed commissioner of the Republic to liaise between the shipyards and assembly places in Flushing and the Texel, and the French military authorities, and with the First Consul personally. (Note: De Jonge tells us that originally admiral de Winter was selected for this role, but that Bonaparte did not want him, possibly because of his well-known "republican proclivities." The Staatsbewind then selected an older brother of Verhuell, who declined the honor, but put forward his younger brother; de Jonge, p. 540) The Staatsbewind intended for him to represent Batavian interests, and "cushion" them against the French leader's continuously erupting outburst of displeasure, but they were to be disappointed. Bonaparte was very dissatisfied with the "foot-dragging" of the Dutch, and Verhuell shared his zeal for ramping up production. Pleasantly surprised that a Dutchman should share his views, Bonaparte took a liking to Verhuell, and soon began to shower all kinds of favors on him. Verhuell was given the command over the right wing of the invasion fleet, for instance. Napoleon also gave him a "travel-expenses allowance" of 24,000 Francs from the French treasury, on top of the generous per diem he already received from the Staatsbewind.

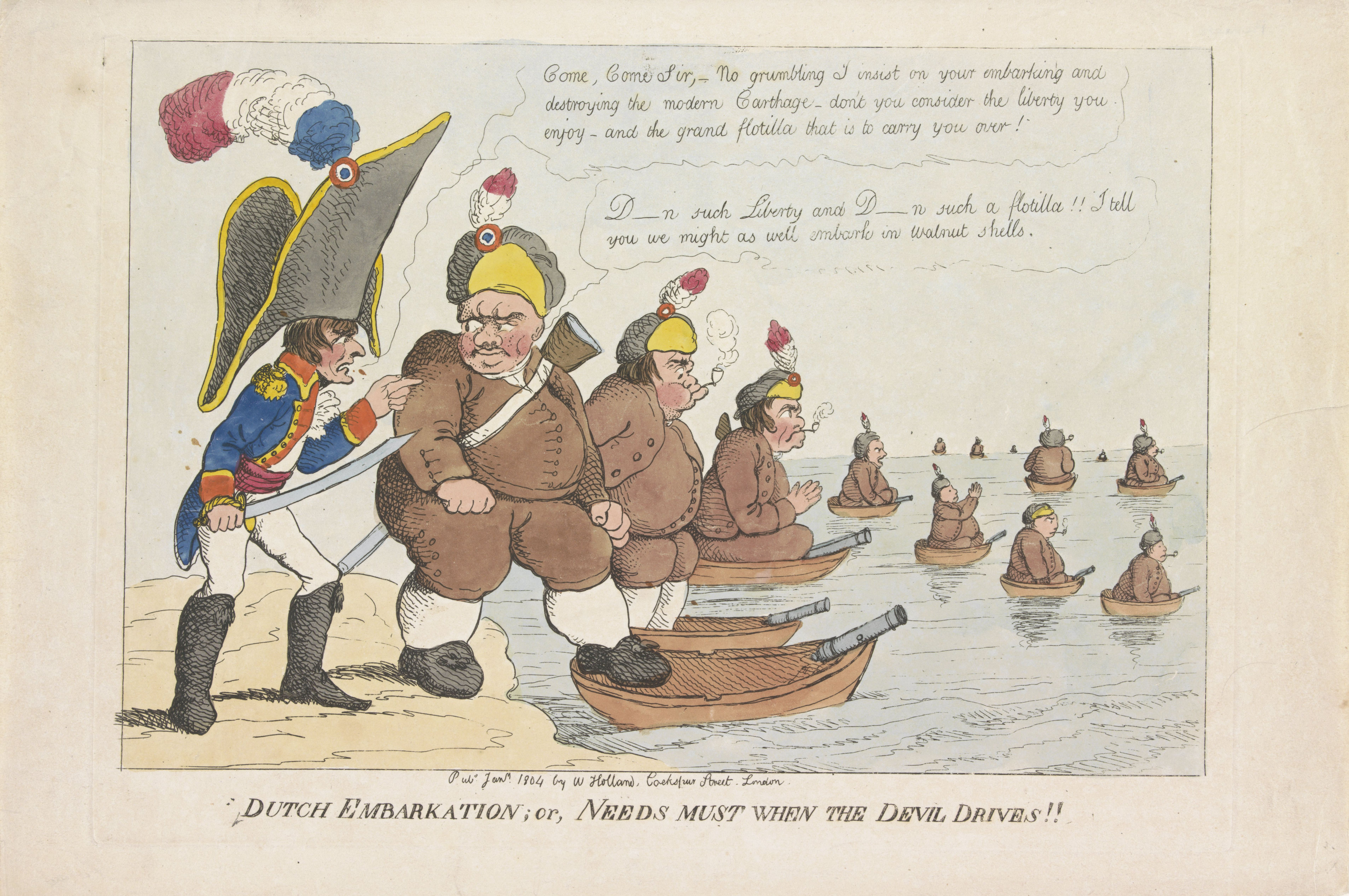
1804 British cartoon mocking the Batavian contingent of Napoleon's invasion force

Verhuell had a close affinity to the authoritarian ways of Bonapartist France. As an Orangist already steeped in anti-democratic attitudes, he had a great appreciation for the "Strong Man" at the head of the French Republic, and he became a willing instrument of that person in implementing his designs. Despite the fact that Bonaparte's demands became more and more outrageous (going far beyond what had been agreed in the Convention of June 1803), Verhuell made sure that they were implemented to the letter. When the authorities in The Hague pleaded lack of resources, Verhuell filed a very negative report to Bonaparte that elicited the expected explosion of rage toward the poor members of the Navy Council from the Great Man. It should cause no surprise that the members of that council started to mistrust Verhuell. Protests against his behavior were waved aside by the First Consul, however, and the Batavian government had to give in.

In February 1804 the member of the Navy Council van Royen (himself from Zeeland) was sent to Flushing to smooth over things with the French and to expedite the construction of the vessels that were still missing from the Flushing flotilla, destined for the invasion fleet. The result was that the final ships were soon delivered, and the flotilla of 378 vessels in total became ready to be transported to the invasion ports in France. The flotilla consisted of three divisions of 18 gun schooners each and 216 gunboats. It was manned with 3,600 Batavian sailors, and a substantial number of French soldiers. It was armed with 1,300 pieces of regular artillery (mostly 6 to 30-pdrs), and carronades, and hand mortars. The quality and morale of the officers and crews was good, thanks to the personnel policies of Verhuell.

On 17 February 1804 Verhuell received Bonaparte's order to start moving the flotilla to the invasion ports. But that was not an easy order to execute. Outside the Scheldt estuary was the British blockade fleet, ready to engage any ship that would come out of the shoals which flanked the Flanders coast. The "mosquito fleet" that Verhuell had assembled were ship-for-ship no match for the larger British warships. Verhuell therefore decided to spread the risk and move the flotilla in small divisions and short stages, first to Ostend, and later to Dunkirk. This happened in the period between March 1804 and March 1805, during which the Batavian ships (often under personal command of Verhuell) made it past the blockading ships, staying close under the coast, and profiting from the cover of French horse artillery. On one such occasion, on 15 May 1804, things got especially hairy when a division of gun schooners and gunboats was engaged by a superior force under Admiral Sidney Smith. Verhuell distinguished himself during this running battle, for which he was made an officer in the Legion of Honour by Emperor Napoleon. The Batavian Staatsbewind was less forthcoming, however, and had to be prodded to give him his due, but relented in June 1804, by promoting him to vice-admiral.

All in all a flotilla of 360 vessels had reached Dunkirk by the Spring of 1805, but Napoleon needed them in or near Boulogne, the projected jump-off point for the invasion. So Verhuell was now ordered to proceed to Ambleteuse (two miles north of Boulogne), where Napoleon had had the harbour improved to give protection to the Batavian flotilla. Verhuell again decided to proceed in stages with small divisions. This often worked out well, except on 24–25 April 1805 when a division under temporary-captain C.P.W. Keller was surprised by HMS Leda (capt. Robert Honyman), which managed to capture eight of the small Batavian vessels near Cap Gris-Nez. The great majority of the division arrived safely in Ambleteuse after a running fight.

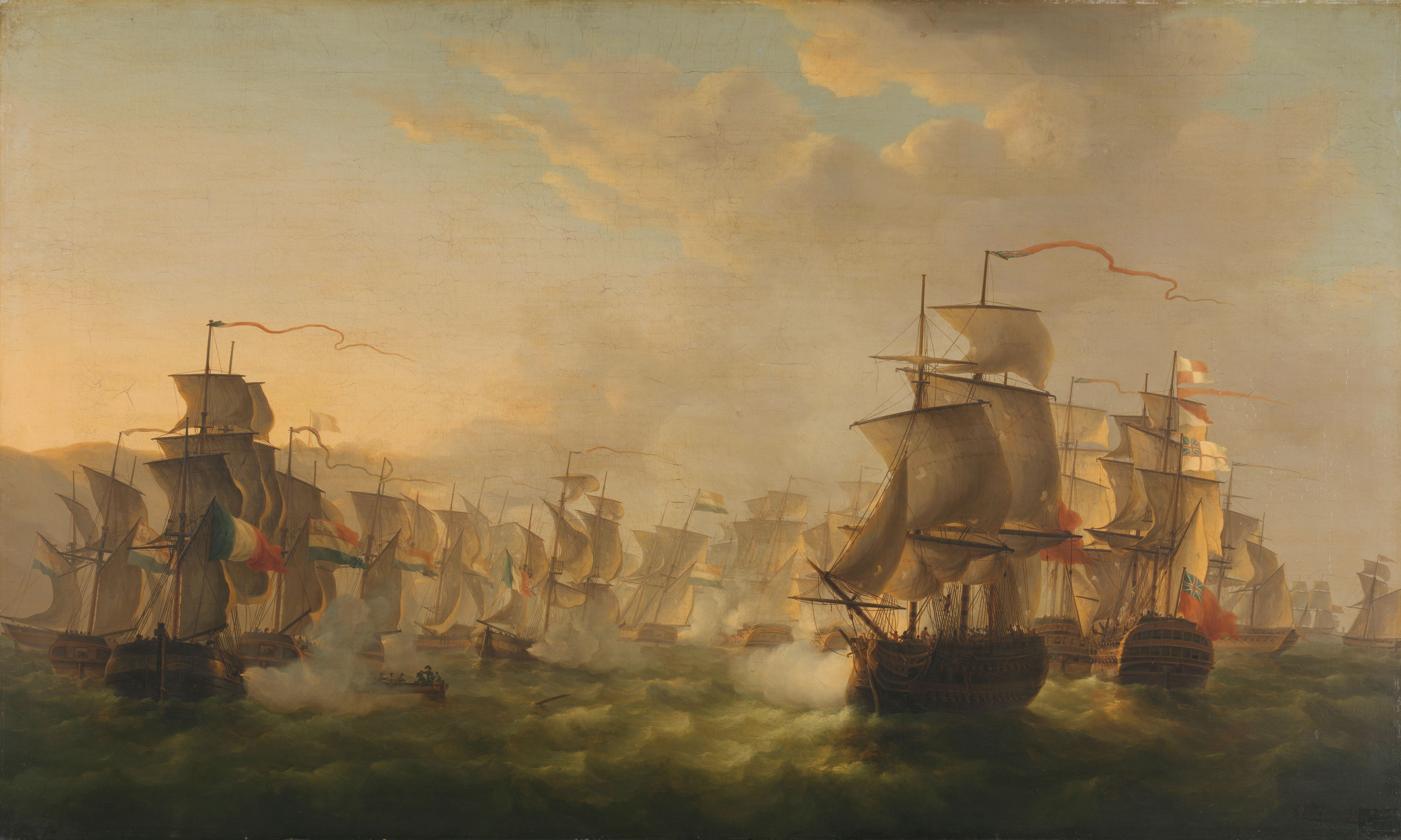
Martinus Schouman The Dutch and English fleets meet on the way to Boulogne, 18 July 1805 (Note: Verhuell commissioned this painting as Minister of the Navy in 1807, after a sketch by cadet Q.R.M. Verhuell; de Jonge, p. 574, note 1.)

On 17 July 1805 Verhuell himself took command of 32 gunboats and four French prams under command of Cdr. Bernard-Isidore Lambour to venture the trip to Ambleteuse. Arriving at the latitude of Gravelines he discovered a fleet of 15 British ships (Note: James says that it was only HMS Ariadne (20) under Capt. Edward King with six to eight smaller vessels; James, op.cit. 1837, p. 309) that attacked him, and forced several gunboats to beach themselves (though some of those managed to regain the flotilla later on). The British force broke off the fight at nightfall and Verhuell decided to anchor in the roadstead of Calais. During the night his chief of staff, Captain A.A. Buyskes, back in Dunkirk, sent off more gun schooners, which joined Verhuells flotilla without being molested, in the morning of 18 July. The British with 19 ships (among which two ships of the line (Note: James gives the following order of battle for the British: HMS Trusty (50) under Capt. George Argles, HMS Vestal (28) under Capt. Stephen Thomas Digby, with three sloops, and the squadron with HMS Trusty already mentioned; James, op.cit. 1837, p. 310)) again engaged the flotilla in a long-range gun duel, that however did little damage to the Batavian ships. The French shore batteries also took part in the duel. The combined fire of the Dutch schooners and French heavy artillery forced the British fleet to break off the fight after two hours. The flotilla suffered the loss of 11 gunboats, that had to enter the harbour of Calais. His flotilla thus reduced to 21 gun schooners, Verhuell decided to round Cap Gris-Nez, well aware that the British were waiting for him. Much against his better judgment, the French marshal Davout joined him aboard the schooner Heemskerk, and around 3 pm Verhuell weighed anchor to proceed toward the Cape. He was now faced by a British squadron of two ships of the line, six frigates and thirteen brigs that neared him to often only the distance of a pistol shot. Two brigs attempted to board Heemskerk, but were repelled. The Batavian ships were from the shore supported by Davout's horse artillery, and the British ships mostly over-shot the low-lying Dutch vessels, so that the damage remained limited. Finally, Verhuell's flotilla managed to round the Cape, after which the British attack abated, though they followed the flotilla till it had safely reached Ambleteuse around 7 pm. The British then made a final attempt to sink the Dutch flotilla, lying at anchor below the shore batteries, by gunfire, but were driven off by the French heavy guns after an hour. (Note: While Verhuell was underway to Ambleteuse, the French admiral, Lacrosse, launched a diversionary action with ships from the Boulogne flotilla. These were met by a squadron with HMS Immortalité under Capt. Edward Owen, HMS Hebe HMS Arab and HMS Harpy. This separate action often gets convoluted with the one involving the Batavian flotilla in the stories of these individual ships, because the British ships later joined the squadron with HMS Vestal that made the final attempt at Ambleteuse.) escaped annihilation. James shows that these actions were actually separate in time and place; James, op.cit. 1837, p. 311. Verhuell, not one to leave his exploits in the dark, wrote a glowing dispatch to the acting Secretary of State for the Navy, van Royen, on 22 July 1805, that was immediately published; French reports appeared in the Moniteur of 3 and 21 Thermidor, An XIII (22 July and 9 August 1805); de Jonge, p. 574, note 1)

In the course of August, the last Batavian vessels of the Verhuell flotilla reached Ambleteuse, and the Franco-Batavian invasion force was now poised to launch the invasion. In Brest and the Texel French and Batavian fleets (Note: This was a fleet of five Batavian ships of the line, several frigates, and many transports with 24,000 French and Batavian troops under the French General Marmont; de Jonge, pp. 577-578.) were waiting to sortie and engage the British blockade fleet. But the waiting was for the return of the French fleet of Admiral Villeneuve, who had made a feint toward the French Antilles to lure the British fleet away from the English Channel. On his return to Europe he met a British squadron in the inconclusive Battle of Cape Finisterre on 22 July 1805, and instead of sailing to Brest, as ordered, took his fleet to Cádiz, rendering the execution of Napoleon's Grand Scheme impossible. In a great rage Napoleon broke up his army camp in Boulogne, and ordered Verhuell to send his flotilla to Boulogne. Verhuell transferred command to captain Gerbrands and himself went back to The Hague, where he accepted appointment to the post of Secretary of State of the Navy from the new Grand Pensionary Rutger Jan Schimmelpenninck (Note: The Batavian Republic had changed its regime for the last time in April 1805 on the orders of Napoleon. The new constitution, written by Schimmelpenninck, concentrated power in a stadtholder-like office, that however, for obvious reasons, had to be given a different name; the choice had fallen on the ancient name of Raadpensionaris. With the change in regime returned the departmental structure for the navy, with a "minister" at its head, in this case called "Secretary of State".) in November 1805.

The Batavian flotilla remained in Boulogne for the next year and a half, kept ready in case Napoleon decided to restart his invasion enterprise. However, on 25 August 1807 he issued an imperial decree in Warsaw, where he happened to be at that moment, ordering the dissolution and disarmament of the French and Dutch troops in Boulogne. By that time the Batavian Republic and Batavian navy no longer existed, as the Republic had been forced to "petition" the emperor to be allowed to accept the emperor's brother Louis Bonaparte as king of Holland on 5 June 1806. With the change in regime the Batavian Navy became the navy of the Kingdom of Holland.

== Notes and references ==
=== Sources ===
- Colenbrander, H.T. (1907). "Gedenkstukken der algemeene geschiedenis van Nederland van 1795 tot 1840, vol. 3". Google Books (in Dutch). Nijhoff.
- Jonge, J.C. de (1862). "Geschiedenis van het Nederlandsche Zeewezen, deel 5". Google Books (in Dutch). Kruseman.
- Lloyd, Christoffer, St. Vincent and Camperdown. Pickle Partners Publishing, Jul 11, 2017
- Schama, S. (1977), Patriots and Liberators. Revolution in the Netherlands 1780-1813, New York, Vintage books, ISBN 0-679-72949-6
