= Jacobus Spoors =

Dutch politician

Jacobus Spoors (Hazerswoude, 14 September 1751 – The Hague, 3 April 1833) was a Dutch politician (Patriot party) in the Batavian Republic.

== Career ==
- Attorney, Leiden, since 1777
- Member for Leiden, Provisionele Representanten van het Volk van Holland, 26 January 1795
- Member, Comité van Waakzaamheid van Holland, 1795
- advocaat-fiscaal (prosecutor) Comité tot de Zaken van de Koloniën en Bezittingen op de kust van Guinea en in Amerika, 13 October 1795 – 10 February 1798
- agent (government minister) Agentschap van Marine (Department of the Navy), 10 February 1798 – June 1798
- Member Intermediair Uitvoerend Bewind, 13 June 1798 – 17 August 1798
- agent, Agentschap van Marine, 25 December 1798 – 17 October 1801
- Member Staatsbewind of the Batavian Republic, 21 October 1801 – 29 April 1805

== Sources ==
- (in Dutch) Ette, A. J. H. van (1948) Onze ministers sinds 1798, N. Samsom
