= HMS Alexander (1796) =

History

France
- Name: Alexandre
- Owner: Rouzeau
- Launched: Nantes
- Commissioned: March 1796
- Captured: April 1796

Great Britain
- Name: HMS Alexander
- Acquired: April 1796 by capture
- Fate: Sold 1802

General characteristics
- Tons burthen: 180 (French; "of load"); 125 (bm)
- Propulsion: Sail
- Sail plan: Schooner
- Complement: Privateer:66; HMS:30—40
- Armament: Privateer:10 guns; HMS:6 or 8 × 4-pounder guns

HMS Alexander was the French privateer schooner Alexandre that the British Royal Navy captured in 1796, purchased, and took into service as a ship's tender to HMS Prince of Wales, and later a troopship. She was the victor in two single-ship actions against opponents of equal or greater force. The Navy sold her in 1802.

== Capture ==
On 1 April Invincible, Captain William Cayley, was escorting a convoy to the West Indies. They encountered the French privateer Alexander, and her prize, the Portuguese vessel "Signior Montcalm", and captured them at (37°11′N 18°16′W). Alexander was armed with ten guns and had a crew of 65 men under the command of M. Petre Edite. She was ten days out of Nantz. (Note: Alexandre had been commissioned in March under Captain Jean-Pierre Edet, with 66 men and 10 guns. Although a newspaper of Nantes credited him with taking several prizes in Alexandre, there is no evidence that he had in fact done so. Earlier, he had been captain of the privateer Georgette, which had fallen to HMS Hind.) "Signior Montcalm" had been sailing from Lisbon to the Brazils when Alexander had captured her.

The convoy was so near Madeira that Cayley sent the prize there under escort by Albacore, with Albacore under orders to attempt to regain the convoy. Cayley decided to take Alexander with him. Six vessels ultimately shared the prize money for Alexander and the salvage money for the Portuguese vessel Nostra Signora del Monte del Carmo. The six were Invincible, Thunderer, Prompte, the bomb Terror, Albacore, and Grampus.

== Career ==
Admiral Henry Harvey, commander-in-chief of the Leeward Islands Station, decided to use the captured vessel as a tender to his flagship HMS Prince of Wales. Different records give her name as Alexander, Alexandrian, or Alexandria.

Harvey appointed Master Peter Giles Pickernell to command Alexandria. According to a biography, he commanded her for four years. In her he spent much of his time carrying despatches for Admiral Harvey, and then later Harvey's successor Lord Hugh Seymour. However, it is also clear that there was apparently a break in his command.

Alexandria and Pickerell were apparently at the capture of Trinidad (21 February 1797), the unsuccessful attack on Puerto Rico (17 April 1797).

During at least part of the second half of 1797 Alexander was under the command of Lieutenant William Wood Senhouse. Harvey sent Alexandrian out in quest of some privateers that were reported off Martinique. On 15 August 1797 she encountered the French privateer Coq of six guns and 36 men. After an engagement of three-quarters of an hour, Le Coq struck. She had lost two men killed and five wounded. (Note: Coq was a privateer schooner, commissioned in February 1797 in Saint-Domingue with 34 men and six guns (4 or 6-pounders).) That same evening Alexandrian attacked another, larger schooner. After a running fight, the French vessel escaped in the darkness.

In September Alexander delivered dispatches to the Governor of Demerara and to Captain Jemmett Mainwaring of Babet, after which Senhouse sailed for Barbados. At daylight on 4 October Alexandria was some five or six leagues west of Barbados when she sighted a schooner in pursuit of an American brig. By 9:00am Senhouse was able to bring the schooner, which proved to be the French privateer Epicharis, to action. After 50 minutes the privateer struck. Epicharis was armed with eight guns and had a crew of 74 men. Alexander lost one man killed, and four wounded, one mortally. The French had at least four men killed and 12 wounded; Senhouse believed that French casualties were greater, and based his count of 74 men on Epicharis on the number of men actually counted after she struck. (Note: Epicharis was a privateer schooner commissioned in Guadeloupe in 1797 with 74 men and eight guns (probably 4-pounders). On an earlier cruise Epicharis had taken prizes of a total value of c.1,000,000 LC. "LC" may stand for Livre coloniale or piastre-gourde, worth two-thirds of a Livre tournois.)

Harvey designated Pickerell an Acting Lieutenant in May 1798. During his period of command of Alexandria, she also captured several privateers. Pickerell's biographical entry gives the number as six or seven. The most important occurred on 9 October 1799 when he captured a privateer of eight guns and 70 men after an engagement that lasted three-quarters of an hour. That same day Seymour had confirmed Pickerell's appointment as a lieutenant.

Alexander's subsequent career is currently obscure. She was at the capture of Suriname (20 August 1799), and at Demerara. On 12 September, 1800, under command of Lt. John Morrell, she made contact with USS Philadelphia between Deserada and Antigua. In March 1801 the tender Alexandria supported the capture of the Danish Virgin Islands, and particularly Saint Thomas, by Lieutenant-General Thomas Trigge and Rear Admiral Sir John Thomas Duckworth. There she covered the landing of the troops. Alexander was also at Tortola on 2 April 1801.

== Disposal ==
The Navy sold Alexander in 1802.
