= HMS Ardent (1796) =

Ship of the line of the Royal Navy

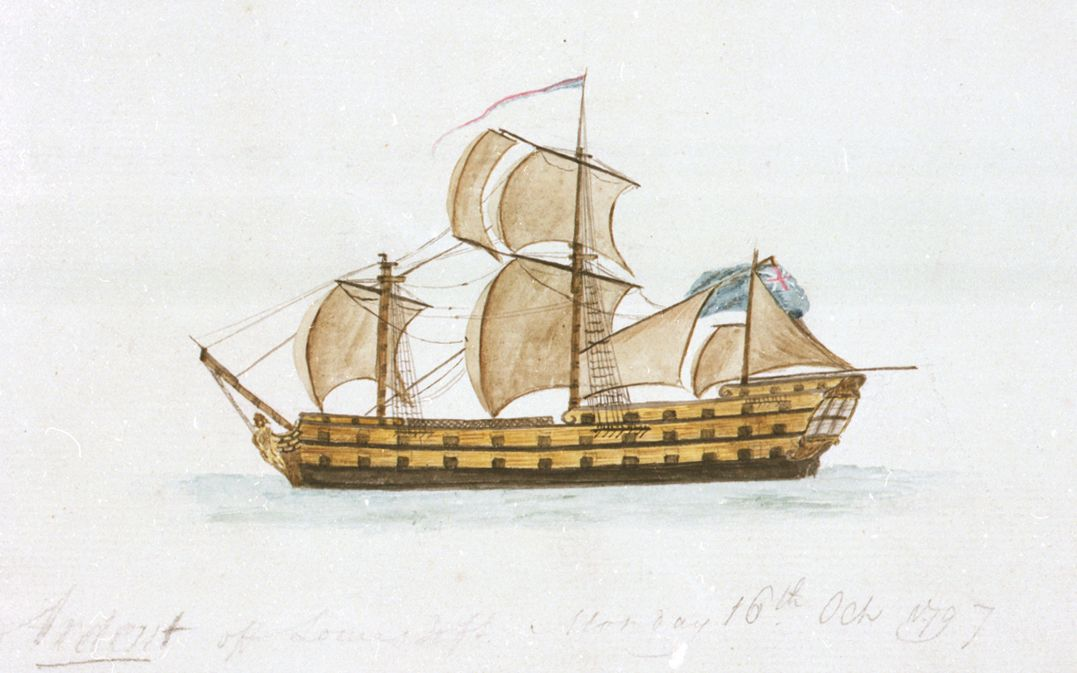
- Ardent off Lowestoft on 16 October 1797

History

Great Britain
- Name: HMS Ardent
- Builder: Pitcher, Northfleet
- Launched: 9 April 1796
- Acquired: March 1795 (on the stocks)
- Commissioned: May 1796
- Honours and awards: Participated in: Battle of Camperdown; Battle of Copenhagen
- Fate: Broken up, 1824

General characteristics
- Class & type: 64-gun third-rate ship of the line
- Tons burthen: 1,41624/94 (bm)
- Length: 173 ft 3 in (52.81 m) (overall); 144 ft 0 in (43.89 m) (keel)
- Beam: 43 ft 0 in (13.11 m)
- Depth of hold: 19 ft 10 in (6.05 m)
- Propulsion: Sails
- Sail plan: Full-rigged ship
- Armament: Lower deck: 26 × 24-pounder guns; Upper deck: 26 × 18-pounder guns; QD: 10 × 9-pounder guns; Fc: 2 × 9-pounder guns

HMS Ardent was a 64–gun third-rate ship of the line of the Royal Navy, launched on 9 April 1796 at Northfleet. She had been designed and laid down for the British East India Company who was going to name her Princess Royal, but the Navy purchased her before launching, for service as a warship in the French Revolutionary War.

Ardent served throughout the French Revolutionary and Napoleonic Wars, notably taking part in the Battle of Camperdown, Vlieter Incident, and Battle of Copenhagen. She served frequently in the Baltic Sea during her career, before becoming a prison ship in 1813 and being broken up at Bermuda in 1824.

== Construction ==
Ardent was built as a ship of the East India Company named Princess Royal, by Thomas Pitcher at Northfleet. She was one of five ships purchased from the East India Company by the Royal Navy while they were either being built or being serviced in 1795. As a 64-gun ship of the line, Ardent differed from ships built by the Royal Navy in being around 13 feet longer and having a detached quarterdeck and forecastle. The extra length of the ships meant that an extra gun port was available, but this was not used on Ardent.

Ardent was registered by the Navy on 14 July 1795 and launched on 9 April 1796 with the following dimensions: 173 feet 3 inches (52.8 m) along the gun deck, 144 feet (43.9 m) at the keel, with a beam of 43 feet (13.1 m) and a depth in the hold of 19 feet 10 inches (6 m). She measured 1416 24/94 tons burthen. The fitting out process for Ardent was completed at Woolwich on 7 August.

== Career ==
=== French Revolutionary Wars ===
Ardent was commissioned in May 1796 under the command of Captain Richard Rundle Burges as a part of the fleet of Admiral Adam Duncan. In May 1797 while lying at the Nore she played a minor part in the Great Mutiny, when she was fired upon by the mutineers on HMS Monmouth. She went to sea on 10 June 1797 to join Duncan's fleet.

On 11 October 1797 she took part in the Battle of Camperdown. Ardent was in the Weather column of the fleet, and lost forty-one men killed, including Captain Burges, and 107 wounded. Burges was killed only ten minutes after bringing Ardent into the line of battle, with her duel with the larger Dutch ship Vrijheid resulting in higher casualties than any other ship. By the end of the battle, Ardent had ninety-eight cannonballs in her hull, and her masts were so damaged that she could not set sail and had to be towed home by HMS Bedford. The ship's surgeon Robert Young wrote that ninety wounded were brought below such that "the whole cockpit deck, cabins, wing berths and part of the cable tier" were covered with them, and as more arrived they were simply "laid on top of each other at the foot of the ladder where they were brought down." Young noted he was forced to reprimand many of the injured sailors for screaming too loudly while awaiting care, as their noise was disturbing the last moments of the many who were dying.

Burges was replaced by Captain Thomas Bertie, who took Adamant to join the squadron of William Mitchell off the Dutch coast in August 1797. As such, she participated in the Vlieter incident in August 1799, being one of the line of ships that intimidated the Dutch Rear-Admiral Samuel Storij into surrendering his squadron of twelve modern warships, after an Anglo-Russian expedition had occupied Den Helder.

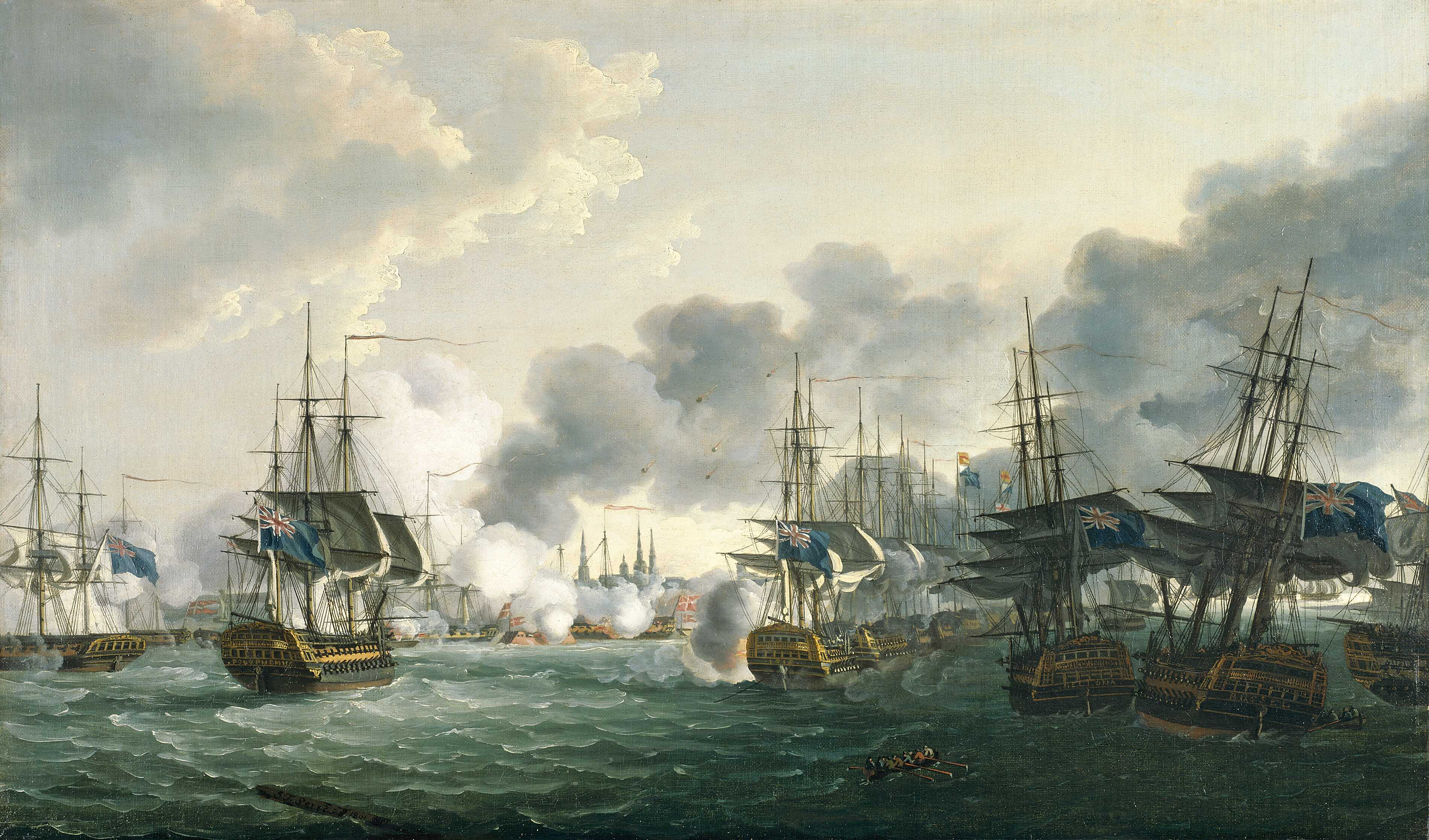
Ardent at the Battle of Copenhagen, 2 April 1801

On 8 December 1800 the captain of Ardent's Marines, Captain Hopper, was court martialled after being accused of using 'contemptuous language' in a letter to Captain Bertie, however, it was established that the letter was addressed to a Marine subordinate and not the captain. Ardent temporarily served as the flagship of the commander-in-chief of the Baltic Fleet, Admiral Sir Hyde Parker, in February 1801 before the Battle of Copenhagen. At the battle itself on 2 April, Ardent was a part of Vice-Admiral Lord Nelson's squadron and lost thirty men killed and another sixty-four wounded. She was one of the first five ships of the fleet to engage the enemy and during the drawn out battle half of her main deck carronades, with which her battery had been replaced, were put out of action. For the rest of the French Revolutionary Wars Ardent was part of a squadron charged with guarding the Thames estuary.

=== Napoleonic Wars ===
After being repaired at the cost of £11,829 at Chatham between August 1802 and April 1803, Ardent was recommissioned under Captain Robert Winthrop and took the French ship Le Prudent on 8 July. By November she had joined Edward Pellew's squadron off Ferrol. On 28 November she gave chase to the French corvette Bayonnaise in Finisterre Bay. The corvette's crew ran her ashore and then set fire to her prevent the British from capturing her. Captain Winthrop of Ardent described Bayonnaise as a frigate of 32 guns and 220 men, which had been sailing from Havana to Ferrol. Actually, Bayonnaise was armed en flute with only six 8-pounder guns, and was returning from the Antilles. On 18 February 1804, still part of Pellew's squadron, Ardent recaptured the ship Eliza.

By September 1804 Ardent was part of the Dungeness squadron of Rear-Admiral Thomas Louis watching Boulogne. In February 1805 Ardent served again as a temporary flagship, this time of Admiral Lord Keith in the North Sea. In January–February 1807, Ardent formed part of the flotilla operating on the River Plate that supported British troops during the Battle of Montevideo. Rear-Admiral Charles Stirling's ships provided seamen to assist in transporting the siege train to Montevideo, and Ardent lost one seaman killed, and a midshipman and four seamen wounded. In 1808 she was assigned to convoy duty, escorting British merchantmen between The Nore and Gothenburg.

Ardent was fitted as a guardship, serving as such at Leith between April and June 1808. She was then recommissioned to serve as flagship to Vice-Admiral James Vashon; after serving in the Baltic she was briefly fitted out as a troopship before returning to the Baltic until early 1813. On 19 April 1809 a party of eighty men from Ardent landed on the island of Romsø to gather firewood and water, and were captured by a force of 300 Danes that had landed the previous day. The officer in charge, Lieutenant Price, was later exchanged but taken prisoner again in the Autumn when a prize he was commanding was wrecked in Norway.

In the middle of September 1812 Ardent escorted Mary Ann and two other vessels from Bermuda and to Portsmouth, arriving there on 22 October.

== Fate ==
Ardent was fitted as a prison ship in February 1813, serving at Bermuda until she became a hulk at Halifax from 1817 to 1822. She was broken up at Bermuda in March 1824.
