= HMS Albacore (1793) =

Sloop of the Royal Navy

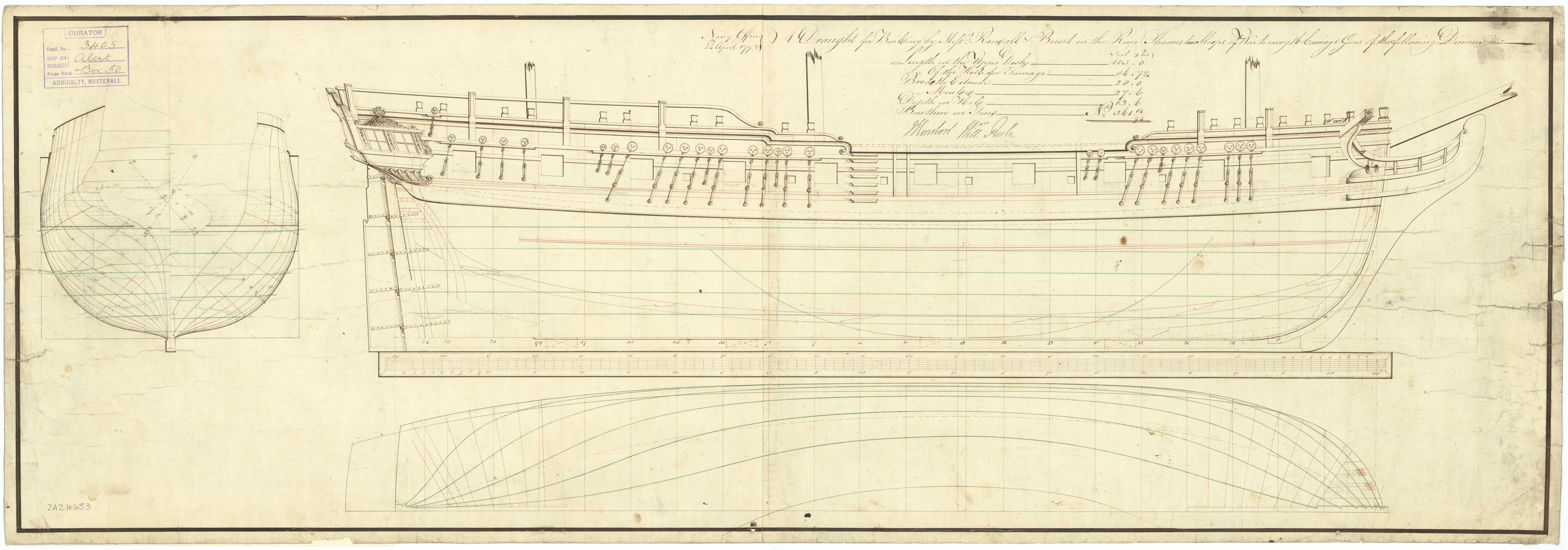
- Plans of the Albacore

History

Great Britain
- Name: HMS Albacore
- Namesake: Albacore
- Ordered: 18 February 1793
- Builder: John Randall & Co., Rotherhithe
- Laid down: April 1793
- Launched: 19 November 1793
- Commissioned: November 1793
- Fate: Sold 1802

General characteristics
- Class & type: Pylades-class ship–sloop
- Tons burthen: 36578/94 (bm)
- Length: Overall:105 ft 3 in (32.1 m); Keel:86 ft 9 1/2 in (26.5 m)
- Beam: 28 ft 2 in (8.6 m)
- Depth of hold: 13 ft 6 in (4.1 m)
- Complement: 125 (121 later)
- Armament: Upper deck:16 × 6-pounder guns + 4 × ½–pounder swivel guns; Upper deck (later): 16 × 24-pounder carronades; QD: 6 × 12-pounder carronades; Fc:2 × 12-pounder carronades

HMS Albacore (or Albicore) was launched in 1793 at Rotherhithe. She captured several privateers and a French Navy corvette before she was sold in 1802.

== Career ==
Commander George Parker commissioned Albacore in November 1793, for cruising. In June 1795 she was under the command of Richard Fellowes in the Downs squadron. Later, Commander Philip Wodehouse replaced Fellowes, being promoted commander into Albacore. He was promoted to post captain on 23 December. In January 1796 Commander George Eyre took command.

On 7 January 1796 Albacore sailed for Jamaica. Eyre was promoted to post captain on 6 February into HMS Prompte. Commander Robert Winthrop replaced Eyre in command of Albacore.

She and HMS Invincible, Captain William Cayley, were escorting a convoy to the West Indies when on 1 April at 37°11′N 16°16′W they encountered the French privateer Alexander and her prize Signior Montcalm. Alexander, of Nantes, was armed with 10 guns and had a crew of 66 men under the command of Captain Petre Edite. (Note: Alexandre had been commissioned in March 1796 under Captain Jean-Pierre Edet.) She had been out 10 days and had captured Signior Montcalm as Signior Montcalm was sailing from Lisbon to Brazil. Captain Cayley sent Albicore and Signior Montcalm to Madeira, with orders to rejoin the convoy as soon as possible.

On 3 May Albacore captured the French corvette Athénienne off Barbados at 14°42′N 47°39′W after a 14-hour long chase. Athénienne was armed with 14 guns and had a crew of 83 men under the command of lieutenant de vaisseau Gervais. She had thrown 10 of her guns overboard during the chase. The Royal Navy took her into service as HMS Athenienne. Next, Albacore was at the capture of St. Lucia on 24 May. She shared in the prize money paid in June 1800.

Winthrop sailed to join Albacore as a passenger on HMS Alfred under captain Thomas Drury. Drury thanked Winthorpe for his able assistance on 13 July at the capture of the French frigate Renommée.

On 17 January 1797 Albacore sailed for Jamaica again. In February she was under the command of Commander Samuel Forster.

On 7 October she arrived at Jamaica with the 3-gun privateer Nantaise. (Note: Nantaise was privateer schooner from Nantes, commissioned in 1797.) (Note: Head money for Nantaise was paid on 6 May 1830. The first-class share (Commander Forester's share), was worth £79 12s 3d; a fifth-class share, that of a seaman or marine, was worth 12s 7½d.) Albicore had brought in one or two other small privateers. One was a copper-bottomed schooner of three guns and 56 men (possibly Nantaise), and the other was a row-boat armed with swivel guns and small arms.

In November 1798 she was under the command of Commander Thomas White, on the Jamaica Station. He remained in command until June 1799. Sometime before 11 May, 1799 she seized American brigantine "Neptune" that was returning to the U.S. in ballast after being a flag of truce vessel transporting French passengers to St. Domingo. Also in May 1799 Albacore's boats chased a Spanish settee into a bay east of Santiago de Cuba, and onshore. However, their quarry repelled them and they returned to their ship. There, Lieutenant Robert Ramsey, the senior lieutenant, received Captain White's permission to take charge of the force and to renew the attack. He succeeded in landing, driving away the enemy with the loss of only two men, and in bringing out the settee. The settee had a crew of 30 men armed with small arms.

Lieutenant John Chilcott replaced White in Jamaica in October. Albacore returned to Portsmouth on 10 September 1801.

== Fate ==
The "Principal Officers and Commissioners of His Majesty's Navy" offered the "Albacore Sloop, 336 Tons, Copper-fastened, lying at Sheerness" for sale on 20 January 1802.
