= Robert Winthrop =

Robert Winthrop may refer to:

- Robert C. Winthrop (1809–1894), American lawyer, philanthropist and speaker of the United States House of Representatives
- Robert Winthrop (Royal Navy officer) (1764–1832), admiral
- Robert Winthrop (banker) (1833–1892), banker and capitalist in New York City
