= Admiral Winthrop =

Admiral Winthrop may refer to:

- Robert Winthrop Simpson (1799–1877), admiral
- Robert Winthrop (1764 - 1832)
- George Teal Sebor Winthrop
