= French brig Victorieuse (1794) =

History

France
- Name: Victorieuse
- Launched: 1 April 1794
- Captured: 25 August 1795

Great Britain
- Acquired: 25 August 1795 by capture
- Honours and awards: Naval General Service Medal with clasp "Egypt"
- Fate: Broken up July 1807

General characteristics
- Class & type: Belliqueuse-class brig
- Tons burthen: (bm)
- Sail plan: Brig
- Complement: 130
- Armament: At capture: 14 × 12-pounder guns; Royal Navy (1795): 12 × 12-pounder guns + 2 × 32-pounder carronades; Royal Navy (1800): 14 × 24-pounder carronades + 2 × 9-pounder guns

Victorieuse was a brig of the French Navy, launched at Honfleur in 1794. The British Royal Navy captured in August 1795 and took her into service as HMS Victorieuse. She captured several privateers and two forts in the Caribbean and then served briefly in the Mediterranean before she was broken up in 1807.

== French Navy ==
Between 4 April 1794 and 27 December, Victorieuse, lieutenant de vaisseau Salaün, commanding, was at Honfleur. She escorted convoys between Dunkirk and points north, returning to Ostend. Next, she made a transit from Havre to Dunkirk. Lastly, she cruised in the North Sea, returning to Ostend.

From 24 April 1795 to 20 June Victorieuse was still under Salaün's command. She was at Dunkirk. Then she cruised in the North Sea. Next she transported personnel from Dunkirk to Kristiansand and returned from there. She assumed her station in Dunkirk Roads.

Capture: On 25 August 1795 Admiral Duncan's squadron captured two French Navy brigs off the Texel: Suffisante and Victorieuse. Suffisante was armed with fourteen 8&6-pounder guns; Victorieuse, still under Salaün's command, was armed with fourteen 12-pounder guns. The two brigs had just set out to cruise the North Sea. The Royal Navy took both into service.

== Royal Navy ==
Commander Robert Winthrop commissioned Victoreuse in October 1795. Commander Jemmet Mainwaring replaced Winthrop and sailed her on 22 February 1796 to the Leeward Islands.

Next, Victorieuse was at St. Lucia on 26-27 April 1796 when a British squadron led by Rear-Admiral Hugh Cloberry Christian and troops under Sir Ralph Abercromby executed a major landing to recapture from the French. She was one of the vessels covering the landing of troops at Choc Bay. She shared in the prize money paid in June 1800.

On 23 April 1796 Commander Edward Stirling Dickson replaced Mainwaring. Victorieuse captured three merchantmen in January–February 1797 and sent them into Grenada.

- 17 January: brig Philipina, Y. Da Deson de Gebe, master. She was sailing from St. Sebastian's to La Gueria, with a cargo of bale goods, flour, etc. when captured off Trinidad.
- 27 January: schooner Laerdolorey, M. Herboy, master. She was sailing from the Main to Port au Spain, with a cargo of bullocks, when detained off the Gulf of Paria.
- 2 February: brig La Bregen, J. Delgade, master. she was sailing from Rio Plata to Havana with a cargo of beef, pork, and tallow, when captured off Trinidad.

In February 1797 Victorieuse helped blockade Port d'Espagne during Admiral Henry Harvey's capture of Trinidad.

On 26 September Victorieuse captured the French privateer Etoile du Matin. Etoile du Matin was armed with two guns and had a crew of 30 men.

Victorieuse was escorting a convoy from Trinidad to St Kitts and was to leeward of Guadeloupe when on 7 May 1798 she sighted two French privateers. They made for her, seeking to take her by boarding. One was a schooner of 12 guns and 80 men, and the other a sloop of 6 guns and 51 men. Victorieuse engaged them, forcing the sloop st strike as she was so damaged that she was in danger of sinking. The schooner then fled; Dickson believed that she too was damaged and had suffered heavy casualties. Victorieuse did not pursue as she was unwilling to leave the convoy. The captured sloop turned out to be Brutus, of Guadeloupe. She was under the command of Citizen Roufel and was 10 days out of Guadeloupe but had not taken anything. She had had four men killed and four wounded before she struck. Victorieuse had no casualties.

- 20 June: Victorieuse captured Trois Couleurs off Trinidad. Trois Couleurs was a privateer of four guns and 33 men.
- 11 November: Victorieuse destroyed a schooner of 20 guns and 80 men that was sheltering under the guns of batteries at Río Caribe.

In December, having received intelligence that three French privateers were operating off the Spanish Main (what is now Venezuela's Caribbean coast), Dickson decided to ensure that the privateers, if the Royal Navy chased them, would not be able to shelter under the guns of the Spanish forts at Rio Caribe and Gurupano. Victorieuse sailed in company with Zephyr. They also had on board a detachment of 40 men from the Royal Rangers. On 2 December Victorieuse destroyed the Dutch privateer Proserpine, from Caracoa, on Cape Three Points on the Spanish Main. Proserpine was armed with two guns and had a crew of 15 men. At 2am on 3 December Dickson landed the troops and some seamen to attack the fort at Rio Caribe from the rear, while Victorieuse and Zephyr attacked from the front. At daylight the fort's commander sent word that he would surrender the fort without resisting. The landing party took away the fort's guns and reembarked. The British then arrived off Gurupano at 4pm, where they found a French privateer in the harbour. The Spanish commander of the two forts refused to surrender and stated that he would protect the privateer. At 5pm the Rangers landed, together with 30 seamen from the brigs. The landing party attacked the forts from the rear while the brigs came up and fired on the front. The landing party took the lower fort within 10 minutes. The upper fort was taken in five minutes. The landing party of 70 men had overcome some 300 defenders. The brigs also took possession of the French privateer, which was armed with six guns and had a crew of 80 men. Dickson took the guns and ammunition out of the forts before destroying the forts, and sent the privateer to Trinidad.

In early 1799 Victorieuse captured a small Spanish schooner carrying salt from Margaritta to the Oronoque River. (Note: Per the (archaic) spelling in the source. Almost certainly not the present Oronoque River.)

In December 1800 Commander John Richards replaced Dickson. Victorieuse then served in the Mediterranean.

Victorieuse served in the fleet under Admiral Lord Keith in the Egyptian campaign between 8 March and 2 September 1801.

Victorieuse was among the vessels that shared in the proceeds of the capture of Rosa on 26 February 1801.

Then on 18 April Victorieuse, Captain J. Richards, captured the French trabaccolo Madona de Lorette, which was sailing from Ancona to Alexandria.

Peterel and Victorieuse drove a Greek caicque onshore on 11 March at Tower of Arabs. The vessel was on her way to Alexandria.

On 9 June Victorieuse captured the polacca Vierge de Niegrs.

Her service in the Egyptian campaign qualified Victorieuse for prize money for the campaign. (Note: A first-class share of the prize money awarded in April 1823 was worth £34 2s 4d; a fifth-class share, that of a seaman, was worth 3s 11½d. The amount was small as the total had to be shared between 79 vessels and the entire army contingent.) In 1850 the Admiralty awarded the Naval General Service Medal with clasp "Egypt" to claimants from the crews of the vessels that had served in the navy's Egyptian campaign, including Victorieuse.

== Fate ==
The Navy paid off Victorieuse in October 1803. She was broken up in July 1807.
