= Royal Charlotte (1789 EIC ship) =

History

East India Company
- Name: Royal Charlotte
- Owner: John Clements, principal managing owner.
- Builder: Thomas Pitcher, Northfleet
- Launched: 2 November 1789
- Fate: Sold to the Royal Navy in 1795

United Kingdom
- Name: HMS Malabar
- Acquired: 1795 by purchase
- Fate: Foundered October 1796

General characteristics
- Class & type: Fourth rate in Royal Navy service
- Tons burthen: 125219/94 (bm)
- Length: 161 ft 0 in (49.1 m) (overall); 132 ft 3 1/4 in (40.3 m) (keel)
- Beam: 42 ft 2 1/4 in (12.9 m)
- Depth of hold: 17 ft 6 in (5.3 m)
- Sail plan: Full-rigged ship
- Complement: 350 as Fourth Rate
- Armament: Lower deck: 28 × 18-pounder guns; Upper deck: 26 × 32-pounder carronades

Royal Charlotte was launched in 1789 as an East Indiaman for the British East India Company (EIC). She made two trips to China for the EIC and on the second of these, after the outbreak of war with France in 1793, assisted at the British capture of Pondicherry. Then, the Admiralty, desirous of quickly building up the Royal Navy, purchased a number of commercial vessels, including nine East Indiamen, to meet the need for small two-decker fourth rates to serve as convoy escorts. The Admiralty purchased Royal Charlotte in 1795 and renamed her HMS Malabar. She made a trip to the West Indies where she was the lead ship of a small squadron that captured some Dutch colonies. She foundered in 1796 while escorting a convoy in the North Atlantic.

== East Indiaman ==
Royal Charlotte was the first vessel built by Thomas Pitcher at Northfleet. A model of her is in Northfleet Church.

Josiah Pryce, who was her captain for both her journeys to the Far East, seems to have been a thoroughly unpleasant and cruel person.

=== Journey 1 (1790-91) ===
Pryce left The Downs on 5 January 1790, bound for St Helena, Benkulen and China. Royal Charlotte arrived at St Helena on 27 March. She reached Benkulen on 21 June, and Whampoa anchorage on 24 August. On her return leg, she crossed the Second Bar on 15 November, arrived at the Cape of Good Hope on 9 April 1791, St Helena on 28 April, and returned to the Downs on 26 June.

=== Journey 2 (1792-94) ===
Royal Charlotte left The Downs on 27 December 1792, bound for St Helena, Madras and China. She arrived at St Helena on 13 March 1793 and Madras on 10 June. From there she went to Pondicherry, arriving 14 July. There Triton, Warley, and Royal Charlotte participated in the capture of Pondicherry by maintaining a blockade of the port, together with HMS Minerva. During the blockade the British also captured a vessel "from the islands" that was bringing in military supplies. Pondicherry surrendered on 23 August and Royal Charlotte returned to Madras, arriving on 27 August. On 1 October she arrived at Penang, where the EIC had recently built a factory. Nineteen days later she was at Malacca.

Having left Malacca, the same three East Indiamen from Pondicherry participated in an action in the Straits of Malacca. They came upon a French frigate, with some six or seven of her prizes, replenishing her water casks ashore. The three British vessels immediately gave chase. The frigate fled towards the Sunda Strait, abandoning her prizes. The Indiamen were able to catch up with a number of the prizes, and after a few cannon shots, were able to retake them. The British then returned the prizes to their crews, and took the French prize crews aboard as prisoners of war.

Royal Charlotte arrived at Whampoa on 14 December. At Whampoa that December were several other East Indiamen, among which were several that on their return to Britain the Admiralty would purchase: Warley, Ceres, Earl of Abergavenny, and Hindostan. The British Government had chartered Hindostan to take Lord Macartney to China in an unsuccessful attempt to open diplomatic and commercial relations with the Chinese empire.

Royal Charlotte crossed the Second Bar on 16 February 1794 and reached St Helena on 19 June. She arrived at The Downs on 8 September.

== Royal Navy service ==
Royal Charlotte was commissioned in April 1795 under Captain Thomas Parr and renamed HMS Malabar the next month, as the royal yacht HMY Royal Charlotte was still in service. Thomas Pitcher, who had built the now Malabar, refitted her for naval service, completing the work on 17 July.

Malabar sailed for the West Indies on 24 February 1796. On 15 April, Captain Parr was the naval commander of a small task force that included Malabar, the frigate HMS Undaunted, HMS Babet, HMS Pique, and some transports, and 1200 troops from the 39th, 93rd and 99th Regiments of Foot under Major-General John Whyte to capture the Dutch settlements of Demerara, Essequibo, and Berbice. The 64-gun third rate HMS Scipio, under the command of Captain Francis Laforey, joined the squadron at Demerara. Demerara and Esseqquibo surrendered on the 22nd, and Berbice followed on 2 May. At Demerara the British also captured the Dutch 24-gun ship Thetis, the 12-gun cutter Seagull, and several merchant vessels. The Royal Navy took Thetis and the cutter into service. (Note: Thetis was later scuttled and Seagull was lost, apparently quite shortly after their capture and without entering the Admiralty's books. Thetis was a Dutch 7th Charter frigate of 24 guns, built at Amsterdam and launched in 1785. Seagull was almost certainly the 8th Charter Zeemeeuw, built at Zeeland and launched 1781; she disappears from the Dutch records in 1796. (Note: In July 1820 there was a distribution of prize money to the ships at the capture of the settlements. A first-class share, that of a captain, was worth £451 1s 2d; a fifth-class share, that of a seaman or marine, was worth £1 19s 0¼d.))

== Loss ==
Malabar left Jamaica in July as escort for a convoy sailing for Britain. Some 800 miles west of Land's End she separated from the convoy in bad weather. By 5 October the weather was a full Atlantic storm. Malabar did not handle the storm well, losing all three masts, and having her tiller broken and rudder unshipped. Four carronades came loose and killed one man, injured four others, and damaged her boats before the carronades could be tumbled into the hold. The crew threw her guns overboard and, once the winds had dropped, jury-rigged her, but her timbers started to give way and let in water. On 8 October the merchant brig Martha, of Whitby, came up. She took on Malabar's crew, who abandoned the ship on 11 October. Lloyd's List reported on 25 October 1796 that Martha had arrived at Portsmouth with the crew from Malabar.

The subsequent court martial dismissed the service of a Lieutenant Crocombe for having spent much of the time of the crisis in the wardroom drunk. It also reprimanded the master for joining Crocombe in his drinking and for getting disablingly drunk.
