= French frigate Aréthuse (1791) =

History

France
- Name: Aréthuse
- Namesake: Arethusa
- Builder: Brest
- Laid down: 14 March 1789
- Launched: 3 March 1791
- Captured: By royalist rioters, 29 August 1793
- Fate: Handed over to the Royal Navy

Great Britain
- Name: Arethuse
- Acquired: 19 September 1793
- Renamed: HMS Undaunted, July 1795
- Fate: Wrecked, August 1796

General characteristics
- Displacement: 1314 tonneaux
- Tons burthen: 793 port tonneaux
- Length: 46.2 metres (152 ft)
- Beam: 11.9 metres (39 ft 1 in)
- Depth: 5.5 metres (18 ft 1 in)
- Propulsion: Sails
- Armament: 40 guns

Aréthuse was a 40-gun frigate of the French Navy, built from 1789 following plans by Ozanne.

== Career ==
She was launched on 3 March 1791, and served in the Mediterranean under Captain Bouvet.

In 1793, she cruised off the Pyrenees, along with the 40-gun frigate Topaze.

During the Siege of Toulon, Royalist rioters surrendered Aréthuse to the British. She escaped to Portoferraio when the city fell, and was brought into Royal Navy service as HMS Arethuse.

In July 1795, she was renamed HMS Undaunted.

On 9 February 1796, she sailed for the Leeward Islands under the command of Henry Roberts. She then joined Captain Thomas Parr, in the fourth rate HMS Malabar, as part of the squadron that occupied the Dutch colonies of Demerara, Essequibo and Berbice in April and May.

On 27 August 1796, under the command of Robert Winthrop, she was wrecked on the Morant Cays in the West Indies.
