= George Parker (Royal Navy officer) =

Royal Navy officer (1767–1847)

Admiral Sir George Parker KCB
- Born: 1747
- Died: 24 December 1847
- Relatives: Admiral Sir Peter Parker, 1st Baronet (uncle)
- Military career
- Allegiance: Great Britain; United Kingdom
- Branch: Royal Navy
- Service years: 1773–1847
- Rank: Admiral
- Conflicts: American War of Independence; Third Anglo-Mysore War; Battle of Tellicherry; French Revolutionary Wars; Napoleonic Wars; Battle of Zealand Point; Walcheren Campaign
- Awards: Knight Commander of the Order of the Bath

Admiral Sir George Parker, KCB (1767 – 24 December 1847) was a Royal Navy officer who served in the French Revolutionary and Napoleonic Wars. The son of George Parker and nephew of Admiral Sir Peter Parker, he joined the British navy in 1773 under the patronage of his uncle and served in the American War of Independence. His uncle then promoted him to lieutenant in 1782.

In 1786, Parker was posted to the 14-gun sloop HMS Wasp, before being transferred in 1788 to HMS Phoenix, a 36-gun fifth-rater, in which he sailed to the East Indies to serve in the Third Anglo-Mysore War, seeing action in the 1791 Battle of Tellicherry against the 46-gun French frigate Résolue. Sent home with the despatches of Commodore Cornwallis he was next posted at the commencement of the French Revolutionary Wars as First Lieutenant to the 36-gun HMS Crescent, took part in the taking of the French frigate La Réunion of 40 guns, and was rewarded in 1794 with the command of the sloop HMS Albacore and in 1795 with that of the 24-gun HMS Squirrel.

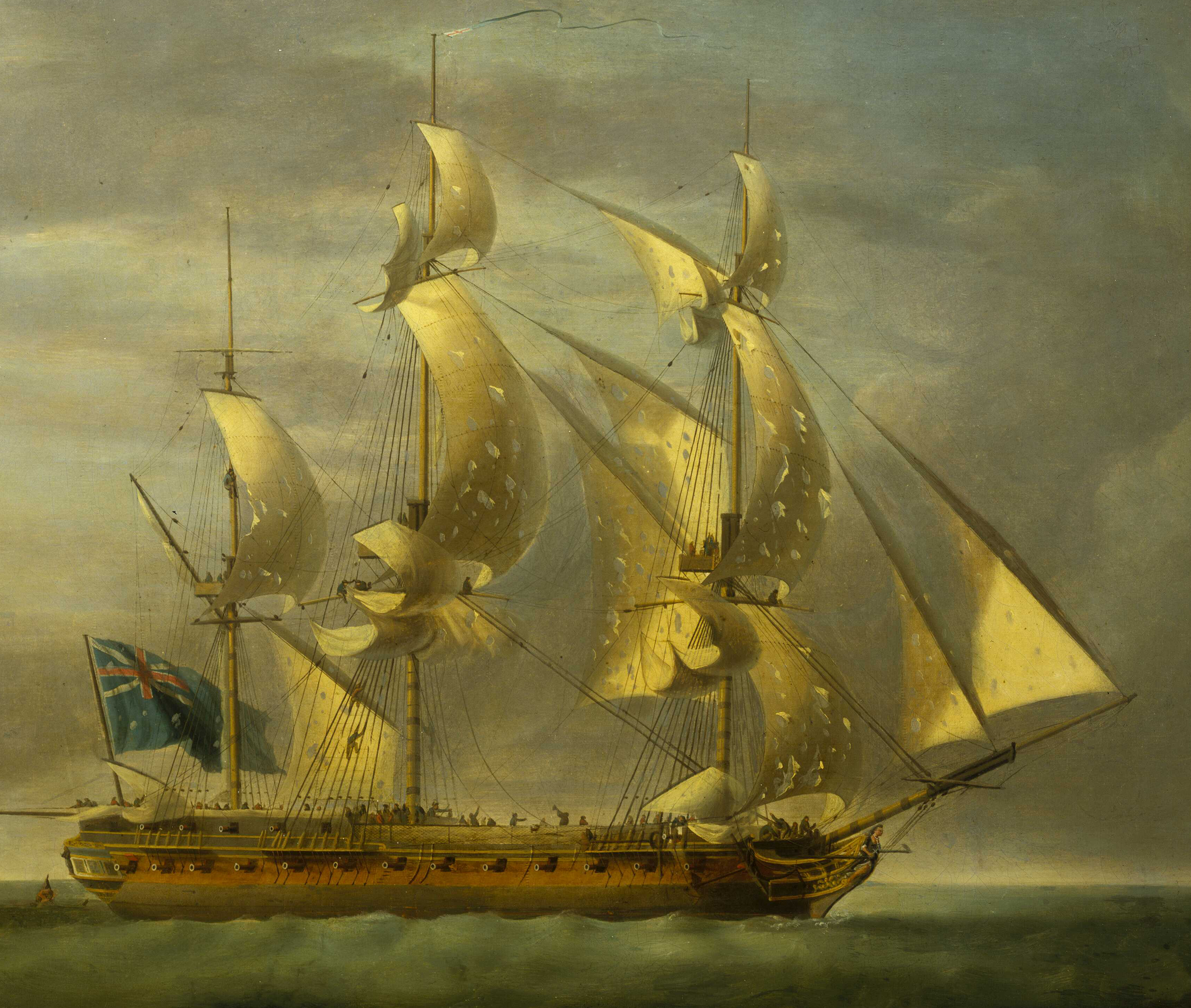
HMS Santa Margarita, which Parker served on

Transferred in 1796 to the 36-gun frigate HMS Santa Margarita and cruising off the coast of Ireland and later in the West Indies, he succeeded in the capture of a number of enemy vessels, including L’Adour of 16 guns, La Victorine of 16 guns, the San Francisco of 14 guns and Le Quatorze Juillet of 14 guns. His next postings were, in 1804-05, to the 44-gun HMS Argo and the 64-gun HMS Stately in the North Sea, where, in the Stately, he was for a time employed in blockading the enemy's squadron in the Texel. After being sent, in January 1808, to the Baltic in command of three ships of the line, they were frozen up in the ice on reaching Gothenburg. Parker, however, arranged for a canal to be cut and thereby extricated his squadron and a large convoy of merchantmen bound for England. Later in the month, in company with HMS Nassau they captured the 74-gun Danish ship HDMS Prinds Christian Frederik in the Battle of Zealand Point.

After his return to England he was appointed to the 74-gun third-rater HMS Aboukir in which (as part of the Walcheren expeditionary force) he was employed in the North Sea and the Mediterranean until the end of 1813. He then returned home and did not go to sea again. He was promoted Rear-Admiral on 4 June 1814, Vice-Admiral on 19 July 1821 and full Admiral on 10 January 1837. His investment as a Knight Commander of the Order of the Bath (KCB) took place on 12 June 1833. He died in 1847. He had married a daughter of Peter Butt. They had no children.
