= HMS Lancaster (1797) =

Ship of the line of the Royal Navy

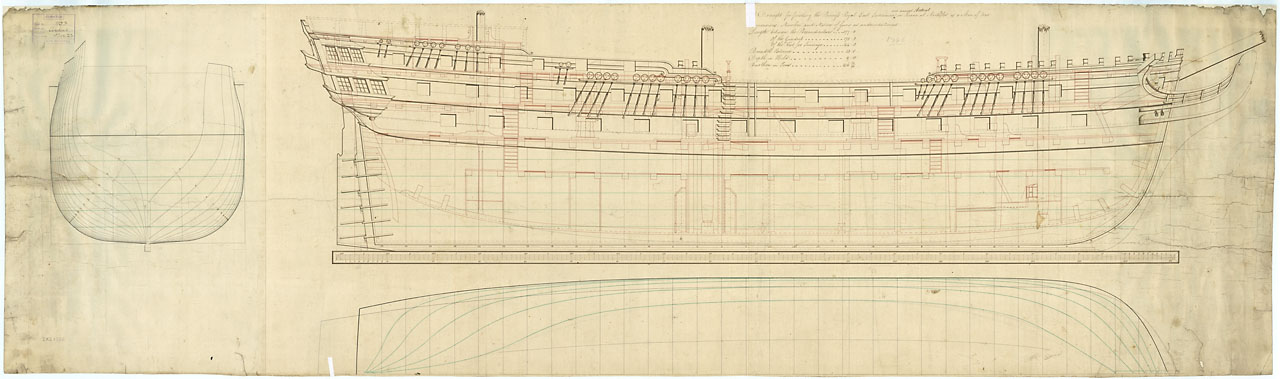
- Royal Naval plan of Lancaster

History

Great Britain
- Name: Pigot
- Builder: Randall and Brent, Rotherhithe
- Launched: 29 January 1797
- Renamed: HMS Lancaster
- Fate: Sold, 1832

General characteristics
- Class & type: 64-gun third-rate ship of the line
- Tons burthen: 1430, or 1416 (bm)
- Length: 173 ft 6 in (52.88 m) (gundeck)
- Beam: 43 ft 3 in (13.18 m)
- Depth of hold: 19 ft 9 in (6.02 m)
- Propulsion: Sails
- Sail plan: Full-rigged ship
- Armament: 64 guns of various weights of shot

HMS Lancaster was a 64-gun third-rate ship of the line of the Royal Navy, launched on 29 January 1797 at Rotherhithe. She was designed and built as the East Indiaman Pigot for the British East India Company, but the Navy purchased her on the stocks because of a shortage of naval vessels to prosecute the French Revolutionary Wars.

== Career ==
On 11 March 1800 she was at Cape Town. In July 1800, Vice-Admiral Roger Curtis sent Lancaster, Adamant, Rattlesnake, and Euphrosyne to blockade Île de France and Bourbon. They remained until October and during this period shared in the proceeds of several captures.

- Spanish ship Edouard (August). This vessel may actually have been a French ship of 300 tons (bm), carrying naval stores, wine, brandy, and the like from Bordeaux to Isle de France.
- French brig Paquebot (August). She had been sailing from Isle de France to Bourbon with a cargo of wine and goods from India.
- Spanish brig Numero Sete (August). Numero Septo had been sailing from Montevideo to Isle de France with a cargo of soap, tallow, candles, and provisions.
- French brig Mouche and part of the cargo and materials from the wreck of the brig Uranie (September).

On 29 August 1806 Lancaster sailed from Simon's Bay as escort to a number of transports, including Pretty Lass, as part of the unsuccessful second British invasion of the River Plate.

== Fate ==
On 11 March 1815, the Navy converted Lancaster to a storage hulk. The Principal Officers and Commissioners of His Majesty's Navy offered her for sale on 30 May 1832 at Woolwich. She sold on that day to Christall & Co., London, for breaking up.
