= Thomas Bertie =

Royal Navy Vice-Admiral (1758–1825)

Vice-Admiral Sir Thomas Bertie
- Born: 3 July 1758; Stockton-on-Tees, County Durham
- Died: 13 June 1825 (aged 66); Twyford Lodge, Hampshire
- Military career
- Allegiance: United Kingdom of Great Britain and Ireland
- Branch: Royal Navy
- Service years: 1773–1825
- Rank: Vice-Admiral of the Red
- Commands: HMS Duc d'Estissac; HMS Leda; HMS Hindostan; HMS Brakel; HMS Ardent; HMS Bellona; HMS Courageux; HMS St George
- Conflicts: Battle of Ushant; Battle of Grenada; Battle of Martinique; Battle of Copenhagen
- Awards: Knight Bachelor; Commander of the Order of the Sword

Vice-Admiral Sir Thomas Bertie (born Hoar; 3 July 1758 – 13 June 1825) was an English officer of the Royal Navy who served during the American War of Independence and the French Revolutionary and Napoleonic Wars.

His career began in the East Indies, where he served aboard the frigate HMS Seahorse with two fellow youths Horatio Nelson and Thomas Troubridge who he would remain in contact with as they each rose through the ranks in the navy. He eventually spent most of his youth serving in the West Indies and off the American coasts during the American War of Independence, seeing action in a number of battles with the French. He was a commander by the end of the war, but peace left him without a ship or promotion prospects. He married during the period of peace, taking the surname Bertie in accordance with his father-in-law's will, and also used his time ashore to carry out experiments that led to the introduction of lifebuoys to the navy. Returning to active service during the wars with revolutionary France, Bertie commanded a number of ships, often in the North Sea or the English Channel. His experience led to him being assigned to the expedition to the Baltic with Sir Hyde Parker and his old friend Horatio Nelson. Bertie was involved in the fierce fighting during the Battle of Copenhagen, and received Nelson's praise for his actions. This was the start of Bertie's long association with the Baltic, both as a captain, and after his promotion to rear-admiral. His good service led to a knighthood and an appointment to the Swedish Order of the Sword, but seriously weakened his health. He was obliged to resign his command in 1810, and went into retirement, dying in 1825.

== Family and early life ==
Bertie was born Thomas Hoar on 3 July 1758 in Stockton-on-Tees, County Durham, the sixth child and fourth son of George Hoar, the Keeper of the Regalia of England at the Tower of London, and his wife Francis. His name was entered into the books of the yacht HMY William & Mary in March 1771, when he was just twelve years old, but this was only for seniority, and he spent his early life being educated, first at a navigation school in his native Stockton, followed by a move to London to attend Mr Eaton's academy, and then Christ's Hospital. He first went to sea in October 1773, joining the 24-gun HMS Seahorse under Captain George Farmer.

Also serving aboard the Seahorse as midshipman and able seaman respectively were the young Horatio Nelson and Thomas Troubridge. The three future admirals became good friends and would remain in correspondence with each other throughout their lives.

Hoar transferred to the 50-gun HMS Salisbury under Commodore Sir Edward Hughes on 27 June 1777 at the instigation of Hoar's patron, Lord Mulgrave, and returned to England on 14 May 1778. He was promoted to lieutenant on 21 May that year, and appointed to serve aboard the 74-gun HMS Monarch under Joshua Rowley.

With Rowley, he was present at the Battle of Ushant on 27 July 1778, and in December moved with Rowley to the 74-gun HMS Suffolk.

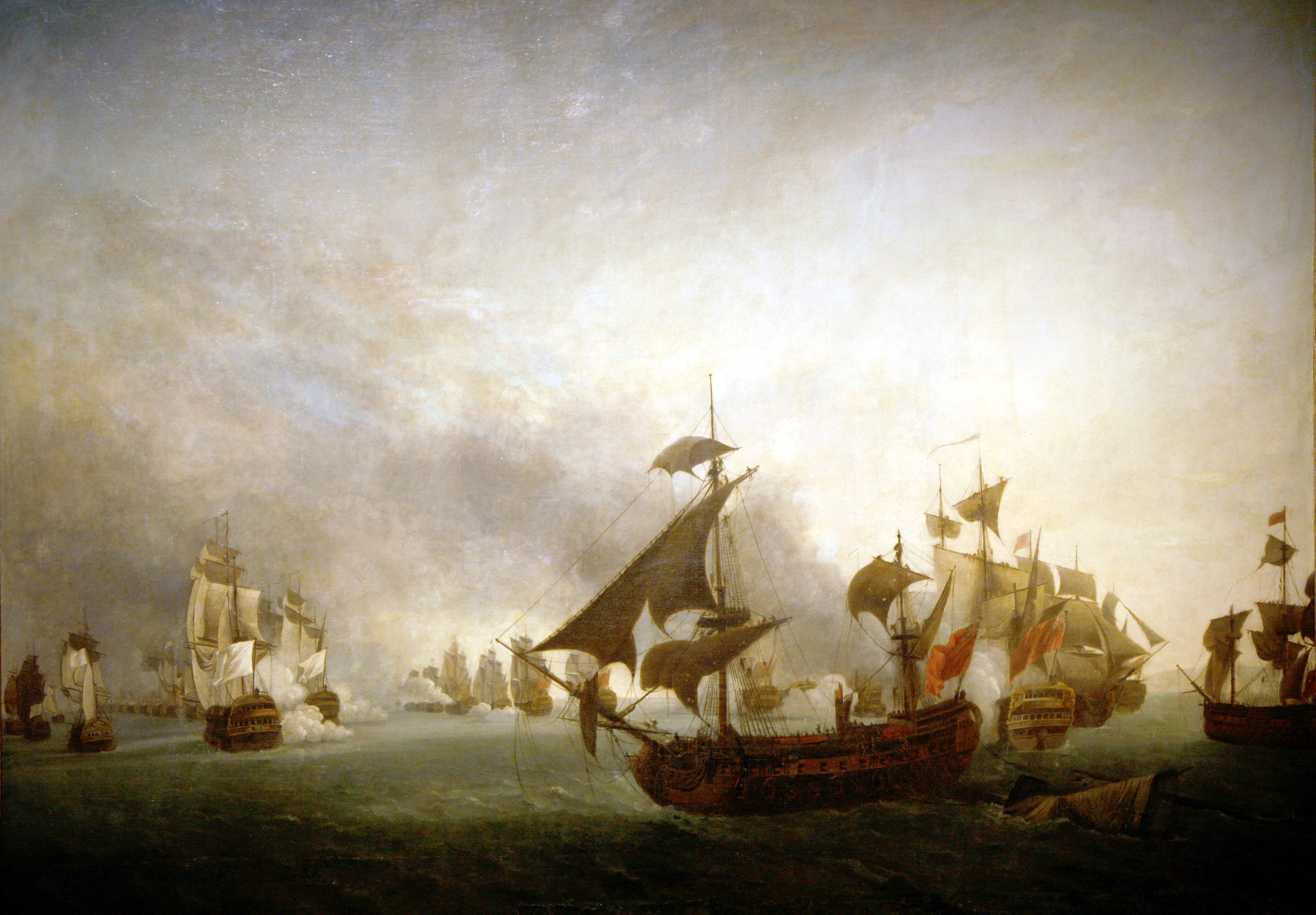
Battle of Grenada, by Jean-François Hue

Rowley and Hoar sailed to the West Indies to support operations there against the French fleets. Hoar saw action with Admiral John Byron's fleet at the Battle of Grenada on 6 July 1779, and then in two subsequent boat actions in December off Martinique. Hoar continued to serve under Rowley, accompanying him when he moved his flag to the 74-gun HMS Conqueror in March 1780.

With Rowley, Hoar saw action against the Comte d'Estaing at the Battle of Martinique on 17 April, and in two indecisive actions on 15 and 19 May. Rowley made Hoar his flag-lieutenant for his good service in July, and on 10 August 1782 Hoar was promoted to commander, and given command of the 16-gun sloop HMS Duc d'Estissac based at Port Royal. He remained in this position until the end of the war, at which his ship was paid off after her return to England in August 1783.

== Interwar period and marriage ==
Hoar remained on half-pay at the rank of commander for the years between the end of the American War of Independence, and the start of the French Revolutionary Wars. He married during this time ashore, taking as his wife Catherine Dorothy Bertie, daughter of Peregrine Bertie. The couple were married at St Marylebone Parish Church on 20 May 1788, after which Hoar took the surname Bertie, in accordance with his father-in-law's will. Also in 1788 he carried out a series of experiments at Spithead, that led to the introduction of lifebuoys into the navy.

The Nootka Crisis in 1790 led to Bertie receiving his long delayed promotion to post-captain, on 22 November 1790. He received the command of HMS Leda but the easing of tensions led to her being paid off and Bertie was left without a ship. This continued even after the start of the French Revolutionary Wars in 1793, until September 1795, when he took command of the 54-gun HMS Hindostan with orders to serve in the West Indies.

== Command ==
Bertie followed through on his orders, but while serving at Port-au-Prince in the West Indies he suffered a severe attack of yellow fever, and was invalided home in October 1796. He recovered his health and on 29 March 1797 he was appointed to command the 54-gun HMS Brakel at Plymouth. He was part of the court that court-martialled Captain John Williamson for misconduct during the Battle of Camperdown, and afterwards received an appointment to command the 64-gun HMS Ardent in the North Sea. Nelson wrote to congratulate Bertie, calling the Ardent 'the finest man-of-war upon her decks that ever I saw.' While in command of the Ardent he developed a slight alteration to the 42-pdr carronades carried on her main deck. Bertie observed that if the chock were depressed by two inches, the gun could be worked and run out with a smaller number of people, while the recoil was reduced and the force of the shot increased. Bertie reported this to the Board of Ordnance, which subsequently adopted the modification for all the ships in the fleet.

=== North Sea and Baltic ===
Bertie spent the next few years in the North Sea and in blockading the Texel, initially under Admiral Adam Duncan until August 1799, and then Vice-Admiral Andrew Mitchell. After the surrender of the Dutch fleet to Mitchell in the Vlieter Incident on 30 August, Bertie was ordered to take possession of the 68-gun De Ruyter, and then to escort the rest of the prizes to the Nore, arriving there on 10 September. After the failure of the Anglo-Russian invasion of Holland, Bertie assisted in the evacuation and received the thanks of Parliament. He then took part in Vice-Admiral Archibald Dickson's expedition to Copenhagen in support of Lord Whitworth's diplomatic mission. Bertie returned to Copenhagen in 1801, with Sir Hyde Parker's expedition, and was detached to join his old friend Nelson's division for the attack on the city.

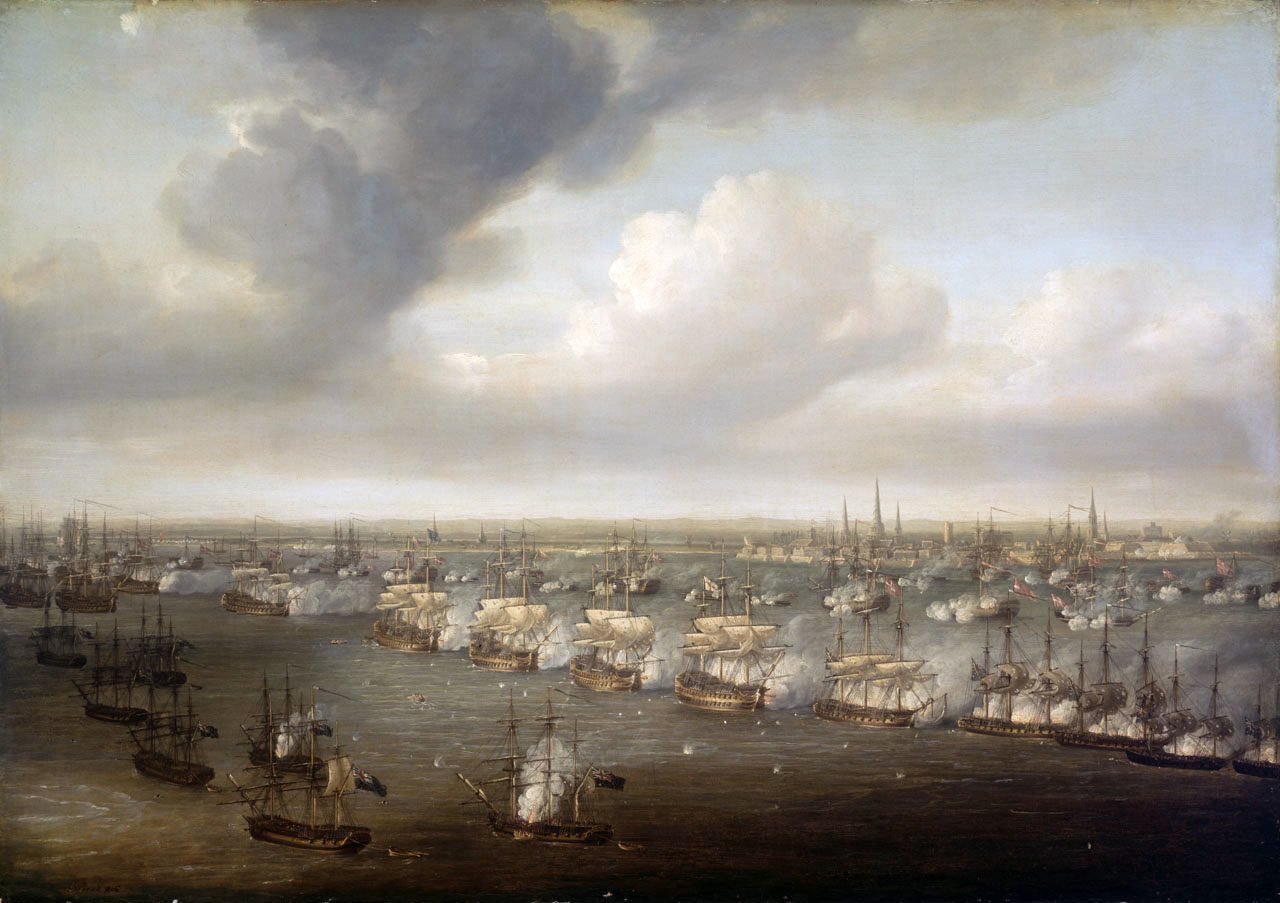
The Battle of Copenhagen, as painted by Nicholas Pocock

Bertie and the Ardent were duly engaged in the thick of the fighting, eventually suffering 29 killed and 64 wounded, with another 40 being slightly wounded but able to continue working. During the battle the Ardent forced the surrender of four Danish ships and floating batteries, causing Nelson to come aboard the Ardent the day after the battle to deliver his personal commendations to Ardent's officers and men for their actions. On 9 April Parker moved Bertie to the 74-gun HMS Bellona, replacing her captain, Thomas Boulden Thompson, who had lost a leg in the battle and was temporarily hors de combat. Bertie spent the next year serving in the Baltic, first under Nelson, and then under his successor, Sir Charles Pole.

=== Cádiz and West Indies ===
Bertie was sent home in July 1802 with a squadron under Rear-Admiral Sir Thomas Graves, and went from there to Cádiz, via Cork, in order to blockade the Spanish fleet there. The Peace of Amiens led to his return to England again, but he was soon sent to sea again as part of Charles Tyler's squadron despatched to the West Indies. He returned to Britain in June, where the Bellona was paid off.

=== Resumption of war ===
The resumption of hostilities in 1803 led to Bertie taking command of the 74-gun HMS Courageux on 3 November. The Courageaux became the flagship of Rear-Admiral James Richard Dacres, and in January Bertie attempted to organise a convoy to the West Indies. Soon after leaving Britain a gale blew up, causing considerable damage to the ship and forcing Bertie to return to Britain. Before he could return to sea, a sudden family crisis forced Bertie to resign his command, not returning to active service until December 1805. In that month he was given command of the 98-gun HMS St George, commanding her in the English Channel. He was promoted to rear-admiral on 28 April 1808, and was requested to serve in the Baltic by Sir James Saumarez.

== Flag rank and later life ==
He flew his flag initially from the 74-gun HMS Orion, followed by the 74-gun HMS Vanguard and the 64-gun HMS Dictator. After a brief return to Britain in January 1809, he returned to the Baltic in March 1809 aboard the 64-gun HMS Stately, where he spent most of the year. He returned to Britain in December, and in February 1810 was obliged to strike his flag owing to his poor health. He was knighted on 24 June 1813 and authorised to accept the award of the Swedish Order of the Sword. He was advanced to a vice-admiral on 4 December 1813. He died at Twyford Lodge, Hampshire, the home of his brother, on 13 June 1825.
