= Henry Roberts (Royal Navy officer) =

Officer of the British Royal Navy

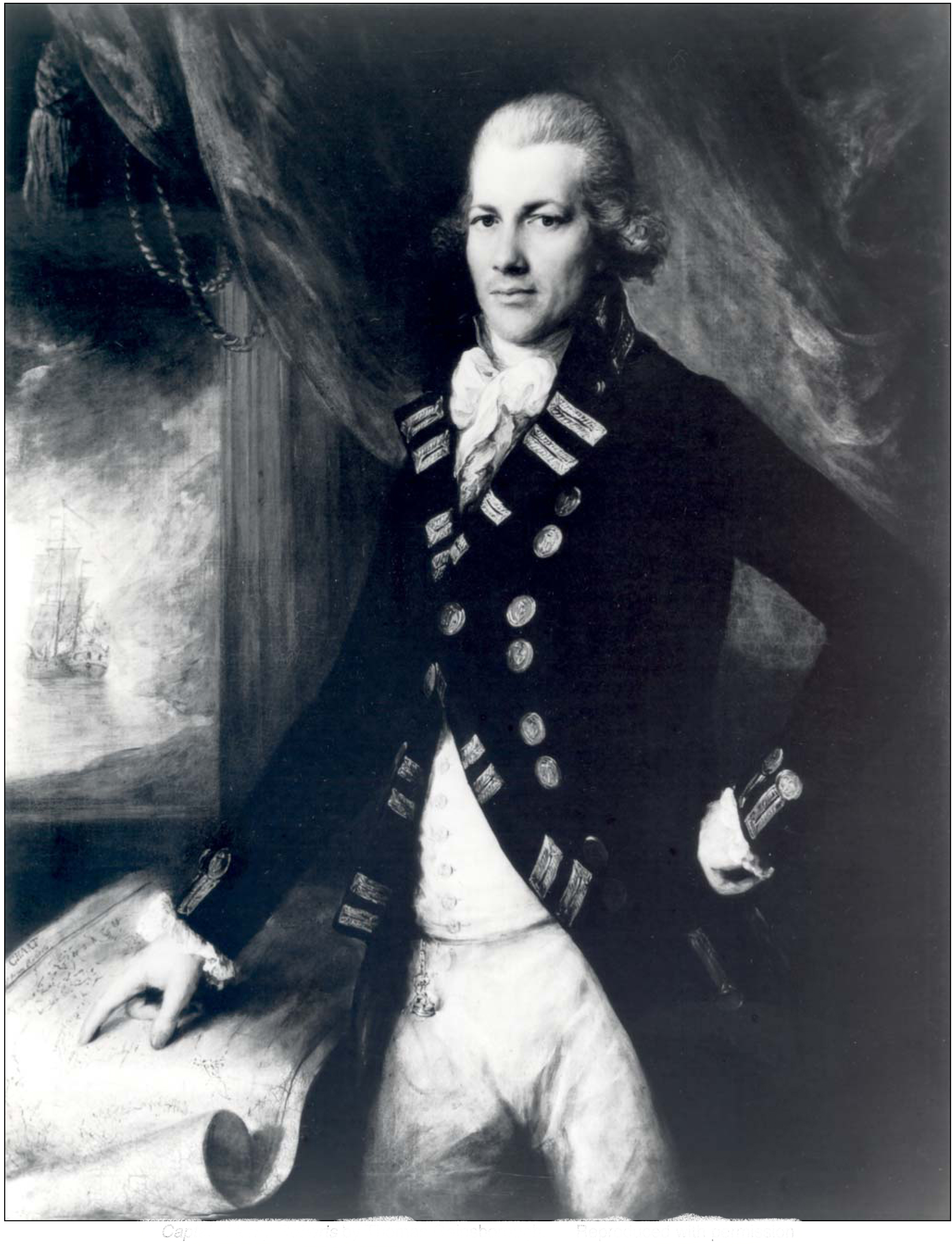
Portrait of Captain Henry Roberts by Thomas Gainsborough.

Henry Roberts (1756–1796), a native to Shoreham, Sussex, was an officer in the Royal Navy who served with Captain Cook on his last two voyages.

Roberts served as lieutenant on Cook's HMS Discovery, where he was entrusted with many hydrographic and cartographic tasks, and also met then-midshipman George Vancouver. Roberts spent many years after that voyage preparing the detailed charts that went into Cook's posthumous Atlas. Roberts also served on HMS Resolution where he was to make a painting of the ship.

In 1790, Roberts was appointed to command a newly built HMS Discovery on another round-the-world voyage and selected George Vancouver as his first lieutenant. However, the Nootka Crisis called both men to duty elsewhere, and upon its resolution, Vancouver was given command of the historic voyage. Aged 40, Roberts died on 25 August 1796, Captain of HMS Undaunted traversing the waters off Jamaica in the West Indies, where he contracted yellow fever.

In November 1791, his youngest sister, Mary Peck Roberts married William J. Stephens Esq, a Lieutenant at the Royal Navy.

Vancouver named Point Roberts after Henry Roberts.

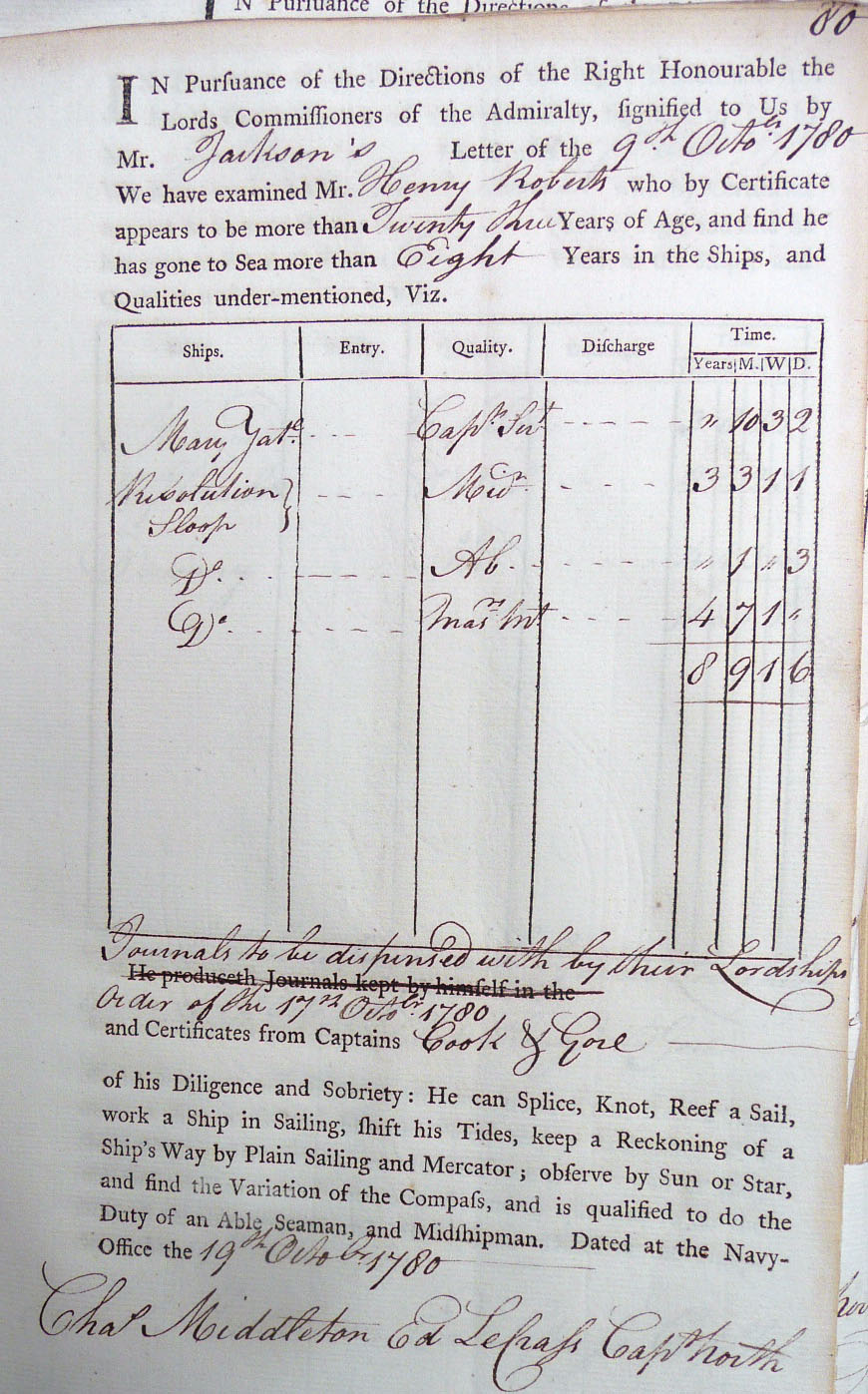
Passing-out Certificate – 9 October 1780
