= HMS Euphrosyne =

Royal Navy brig

History

Great Britain
- Name: HMS Euphrosyne
- Namesake: Euphrosyne, one of the three Carites (graces) of Greek mythology
- Acquired: 1796 by purchase
- Fate: Sold 1802

General characteristics
- Type: Brig
- Tons burthen: 125 (bm)
- Propulsion: Sails
- Armament: 14-16 guns

HMS Euphrosyne (or Euphroysene) was an American brig that Vice-Admiral George Elphinstone purchased for the Royal Navy at Simon's Bay in 1796 in preparation for his attack on the Dutch squadron at Saldanha Bay. She was sold in 1802.

== Service ==
In May 1796 Elphinstone arrived at Simon's Bay from India. There he purchased an American brig that had been damaged. Elphinstone had her repaired, armed, and manned; He took her into service as HMS Euphrosyne.

Then a squadron of the navy of the Batavian Republic, under the command of Rear-Admiral Engelbertus Lucas, surrendered on 17 August 1796 at Saldanha Bay without a fight to a Royal Navy squadron under Elphinstone's command. Euphrosyne is not among the vessels listed as qualifying for prize money from the captures. This may be a consequence of her not yet being commissioned, or her being viewed as a tender and her crew qualifying by virtue of their being on the rolls of their parent vessels.

On 7 October 1797 a mutiny developed on several vessels at Simon's Bay, Euphrosyne among them. The mutiny ended five days later after Admiral Pringle, the naval commander on the station, promised to address the mutineers' grievances and to issue a general pardon. The mutiny broke out again on several ships, but the authorities were able to suppress it. Ultimately, a handful of the ringleaders were hanged.

In 1799 Euphrosyne was under the command of Lieutenant D. Whittle, and between 1800 and 1802 belonged to a squadron based there under the command of Vice-Admiral Roger Curtis.

In 1800 Euphrosyne was under the command of Lieutenant Thomas Walker. In March or so she underwent repairs and coppering. On 5 May Walker and six others drowned when a boat carrying them to shore at Algoa Bay sank. Lieutenant W. Shirley (probably William Warden Shirley) then took command.

In July, Curtis sent Lancaster, Adamant, Rattlesnake, and Euphrosyne to blockade Isle de France and Bourbon. They remained until October and during this period shared in the proceeds of several captures.

- Spanish ship Edouard(August). This vessel may actually have been a French ship of 300 tons (bm), carrying naval stores, wine, brandy, and the like from Bordeaux to Isle de France.
- French brig Paquebot (August). She had been sailing from Isle de France to Bourbon with a cargo of wine and goods from India.
- Spanish brig Numero Sete (August). Numero Septo had been sailing from Montevideo to Isle de France with a cargo of soap, tallow, candles, and provisions.
- French brig Mouche and part of the cargo and materials from the wreck of the brig Uranie (September).

Also in August Euphrosyne alone captured the Gleneure and her cargo. Gleneure, of 150 tons (bm), had been sailing from Bourbon to Isle de France with a cargo of coffee and cotton, and 40 slaves.

On 17 September 1801 Euphrosyne returned from Rio de Janeiro, together with Jupiter and the storeship Hindostan, after a voyage of about a month. Lion, together with Hindostan, had escorted to Rio a convoy of East Indiamen bound for China, arriving at Rio on 1 August. Captain Losack, of Jupiter, decided to accompany the convoy eastward until they were unlikely to encounter some Spanish and French vessels known to be cruising off Brazil.

== Fate ==
Admiral Curtis sold Euphrosyne in 1802 at public auction at Cape Town for £977 12s.
