= Ceres (1787 EIC ship) =

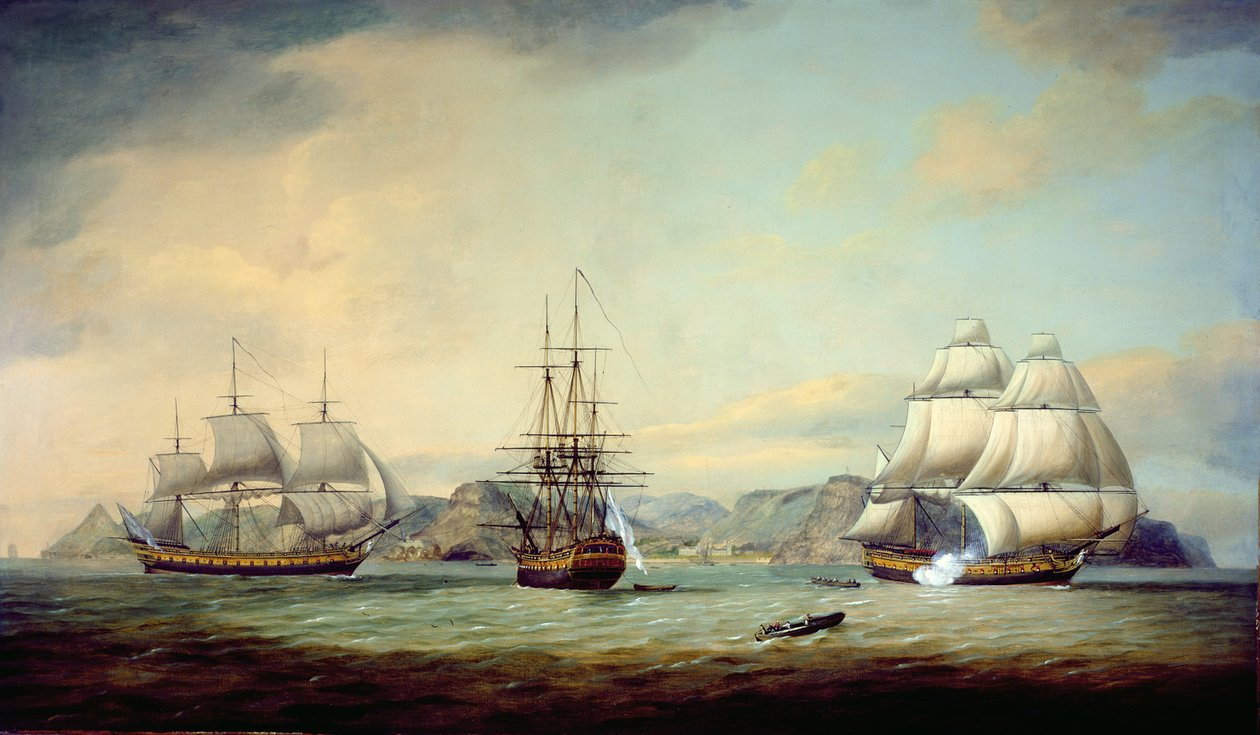
- The East Indiaman Ceres off Saint Helena, by Thomas Luny, 1788; Sir Max Aitken Museum, Cowes, Isle of Wight

History

East India Company
- Name: Ceres
- Owner: Thomas Newte, Esq.
- Builder: Perry & Co., Blackwall Yard
- Launched: 28 November 1787
- Fate: Sold to the Royal Navy in 1795

Great Britain
- Name: HMS Grampus
- Acquired: 1795 by purchase
- Fate: Grounded and abandoned January 1799

General characteristics
- Class & type: Fourth rate in Royal Navy service: Storeship from December 1797
- Tons burthen: 118089/94 (bm)
- Length: EIC; 161 ft 6 in (49.2 m) (overall); HMS; 157 ft 1 in (47.9 m) (overall); 130 ft 5 3/4 in (39.8 m) (keel)
- Beam: 41 ft 3 in (12.6 m)
- Depth of hold: 15 ft 6 1/2 in (4.7 m)
- Sail plan: Full-rigged ship
- Complement: Indiaman:130; Fourth rate:324; Storeship:155
- Armament: Indiaman: 28 × 9- & 18-pounder guns; Fourth Rate; Lower deck: 28 × 18-pounder guns; Upper deck: 26 × 32-pounder carronades; Storeship: Lower deck guns removed

Ceres was an East Indiaman launched in 1787. She made three trips to China for the British East India Company (EIC). After the outbreak of war with France in 1793, the Admiralty, desirous of quickly building up the Royal Navy, purchased a number of commercial vessels, including nine East Indiamen, to meet the need for small two-decker fourth rates to serve as convoy escorts. The Admiralty purchased Ceres in 1795, and renamed her HMS Grampus. In 1797, the Admiralty converted her to a storeship. That year her crew participated in the Spithead and Nore mutinies. Grampus grounded in January 1799, and was destroyed.

== East Indiaman ==
Ceres made three trips to China for the EIC.

=== 1st voyage (1788-1789) ===
Ceres's captain for her first voyage was Captain Thomas Price. He sailed her for the coast of India and China, leaving Portsmouth on 5 April 1788. She reached Madras on 15 July, and Whampoa on 2 October. On the return leg of her voyage, she crossed the Second Bar on 14 December. She reached Saint Helena on 9 April 1789, and Long Reach on 2 June. Other accounts have her returning to her moorings on 1 September 1789. In either case, Price died on 20 June.

=== 2nd voyage (1790-1791) ===
Ceres's captain for her second voyage was Captain George Stevens. He too sailed her for the Indian coast and China, leaving Torbay on 6 March 1790. She reached Madras on 22 June, and Negapatam on 29 July. Two days later she was back at Madras. She then reached Whampoa on 11 October. She crossed the Second Bar on 20 January 1791, and then stopped at Macao on 17 March. She reached St Helena on 3 July, and Long Reach on 1 September.

=== 3rd voyage (1793-1794) ===
George Stevens was again captain of Ceres for her third voyage. She left Portsmouth on 21 May 1793, after war with France had begun on 1 February. The EIC arranged for her to sail under a letter of marque, issued to Stevens, and dated 22 April 1793. Ceres was part of a convoy that also included the East Indiamen Prince William, Lord Thurlow, William Pitt, Barwell, Earl of Oxford, Osterley, Fort William, London, Glatton, Houghton, Marquis of Landsdown, Hillsborough, Pigot, and Earl of Abergavenny, amongst numerous other vessels, merchant and military, most of the non-Indiamen travelling to the Mediterranean.

On 24 June 1793, the fleet of Indiamen captured the French brig Franc; the crew of Ceres took possession. On 10 November, Ceres reached Manila. Then on 20 December, she arrived at Whampoa. At Whampoa that December were several other East Indiamen, among which were several that on their return to Britain the Admiralty would purchase: Warley, Royal Charlotte, Earl of Abergavenny, and Hindostan. The British Government had chartered Hindostan to take Lord Macartney to China in an unsuccessful attempt to open diplomatic and commercial relations with the Chinese empire.

For her return trip, Ceres crossed the Second Bar on 18 February 1794, and stopped at Macao on 16 March. She reached St Helena on 18 June, and Long Reach on 10 September.

== Royal Navy service ==
The Admiralty purchased Ceres and commissioned her as HMS Grampus in December under Captain Alexander Christie, for the North Sea. (There was already a frigate Ceres in the Royal Navy, and a previous fourth-rate Grampus had just been sold for breaking up.) The new Grampus was commissioned on 9 March 1795. She then spent some two months with Perry at Blackwall being coppered. In September 1795, Captain John Williamson took command, and in March 1796, he sailed her for Jamaica.

Grampus shared with five other naval vessels in the prize money arising out of the capture on 1 April, of the French privateer Alexander, and the salvage money from the recapture of Alexander's prize, the Portuguese vessel Nostra Signora del Monte del Carmo. Alexander was armed with ten guns and had a crew of 65 men under the command of M. Petre Edite. She was ten days out of Nantes; the capture took place at 37°11′N 18°16′W. Later, the Royal Navy purchased the privateer and took her into service as HMS Alexander.

In May, Grampus was among the vessels that took part in the campaign to capture Saint Lucia under Rear Admiral Hugh Cloberry Christian and General Ralph Abercromby.

In September, Grampus returned to Britain and was paid off. Two months later she was at Sheerness being fitted as a storeship. Lieutenant Charles Carne recommissioned her in December, with the refitting lasting until February 1797.

=== Mutiny ===
In April and May the Spithead and Nore mutinies broke out. Grampus was one of the vessels caught up in the disorder, and is named in the proclamation read out on 10 June. The exact date of her arrival at Sheerness, the date of her joining the mutiny, and the date of her crew returning to duty are not known. Still, she was at Sheerness by 16 May. At the time, Grampus was preparing for a voyage to the West Indies. After the reading of the Proclamation on 10 June, the crews of a number of vessels sought to abandon the mutiny. On Grampus a fight broke out between loyalists and mutineers, a fight that the mutineer faction won. Under some reports, the mutineers abandoned her.

The mutineers on the various vessels involved found Grampus particularly useful because as a storeship, stocked for a voyage, she was able to provide them with supplies. Still, after the reading of the proclamation the mutiny collapsed and by mid-June Grampus had returned to Royal Navy control. After the end of the mutiny, five men from Grampus were sentenced to death. Another account reports that three men were condemned to death and two were confined to solitary cells. Grampus then sailed for Jamaica in August. There her crew began a mutiny in the Jamaica squadron.

=== Return to service ===
In Jamaica, Admiral Hyde Parker, the commander of the station, was concerned that Grampus had brought a disaffected crew that could spread mutiny there too. He identified one agitator, whom he had hanged. By 1798, Grampus was under the command of Captain George Hart, serving as a transport.

== Fate ==
On the morning of 19 January 1799, Grampus was in the Thames and under the command of Captain John Hall. She weighed at 7a.m., and took a pilot, Sammuel Richardson, on board. Nevertheless, by 9 a.m. she had grounded on the Barking Shelf. She could not be refloated and so for the next three days work went on to remove her stores, her masts, and whatever else could be salvaged. On 21 January, the decision was made to abandon her, as by then she had 20 feet (6.1 m) of water in her hold. The subsequent court martial absolved Captain Hall and his officers and crew of any responsibility, instead blaming Richardson's ignorance.

The wreck proved to be an obstacle to navigation so in April, the Commissioners of the Navy issued a call for proposals to "remove and clear the River Thames of the Wreck of His Majesty's late Ship Grampus, now on Shore on Barking-Shelf, opposite the Powder-Houses". On 12 April 1799, the wreck was set on fire and destroyed.
