= London (1779 EIC ship) =

History

British East India Company
- Name: London
- Owner: Voyages 1-4: John Webb; Voyages 5-7: Robert Wigram
- Builder: Perry, Blackwall
- Launched: 1779
- Fate: Broken up 1799

General characteristics
- Tons burthen: 750, 836, or 8362/94 (bm)
- Complement: 1793: 70; 1798: 70
- Armament: 1793: 26 × 9&4-pounder guns; 1798: 22 × 32-pounder carronades + 9-pounder guns

London was launched in 1779 as an East Indiaman. She made seven voyages for the British East India Company (EIC), between 1780 and 1798. She was sold for breaking up in 1799.

== Career ==
1st EIC voyage (1780–1781): Captain Daniel Webb sailed from Portsmouth on 12 February 1780, bound for Madras and China. London reached Johanna on 15 June and Madras on 23 July. She arrived at Whampoa Anchorage on 8 October. Homeward bound she crossed the Second Bar on 8 January 1781. She reached St Helena on 25 June and arrived in the Downs on 19 October.

2nd EIC voyage (1783–1785): Captain John Eastabrooke sailed from Portsmouth on 11 March 1783, bound for Madras and China. London reached 3 Apr São Tiago on 3 April, Johanna on 16 July, Madras on 20 August, an Batavia on 19 November. She arrived at Whampoa on 20 February 178. Homeward bound she crossed the Second Bar on 7 April 1784. She reached St Helena on 12 November and Cork on 5 March 1785, and arrived in the Downs on 6 April.

3rd EIC voyage (1786–1787): Captain Eastabrooke sailed from the Downs on 2 February 1786, bound for Madras and China. London reached São Tiago on 16 March, Madras on 13 July, and Sulu on- 9 November; she arrived at Whampoa on 17 January 1787. Homeward bound she crossed the Second Bar on 6 April. She reached St Helena on 30 August and arrived in the Downs on 5 November.

4th EIC voyage (1789–1790): Captain Eastabrooke sailed from Portsmouth on 12 April 1789, bound for Bombay. London reached Madeira on 30 April and Johanna on 6 September. She arrived at Bombay on 27 October. She visited Surat on 4 March 1790, returning to Bombay on 7 March. Homeward bound, she reached Tellichery on 28 April, Cochin on 7 May, and St Helena on 9 August. She arrived back in the Downs on 3 November.

5th EIC voyage (1793–1794): War with France had begun when Captain James Ludovic Grant sailed from Portsmouth on 22 May 1793, bound for Bombay. Before he left England, he inquired a letter of marque on 21 March 1793.

London was part of a convoy that also included the East Indiamen Prince William, Lord Thurlow, William Pitt, Barwell, Earl of Oxford, Osterley, Fort William, Ceres, Glatton, Houghton, Marquis of Landsdown, Hillsborough, Pigot, and Earl of Abergavenny, amongst numerous other vessels, merchant and military, most of the non-Indiamen travelling to the Mediterranean.

On 24 June 1793 the fleet of Indiamen captured the French brig Franc; the crew of Ceres took possession.

London reached Bombay on 14 September. She visited Anjengo on 12 November and returned to Bombay on 14 December. Homeward bound, she reached the Cape on 26 February 1794, St Helena on 18 March, and Galway Bay on 20 July; she arrived back in the Downs on 27 August.

6th EIC voyage (1795–1796): Captain Grant sailed from Portsmouth on 24 May 1795, bound for Bombay. London arrived at Bombay on 3 September. She visited Anjengo on 16 November, and returned to Bombay on 28 December. Homeward bound, she reached St Helena on 22 March 1796 and arrived in the Downs on 2 August.

7th EIC voyage (1798–1799): Captain George Lukin acquired a letter of marque on 17 February 1798. He sailed from Portsmouth on 25 March 1798, bound for Bombay and Bengal. London reached Bombay on 12 July, and Madras on 15 August. She arrived at Diamond Harbour on 6 September. Homeward bound, she was at Saugor on 14 December. She reached Colombo on 4 February 1799 and St Helena on 18 May; she arrived in the Downs on 28 July.

== Fate ==
In 1799 she was sold for breaking up.
