= HMS Hindostan (1795) =

Ship of the line of the Royal Navy

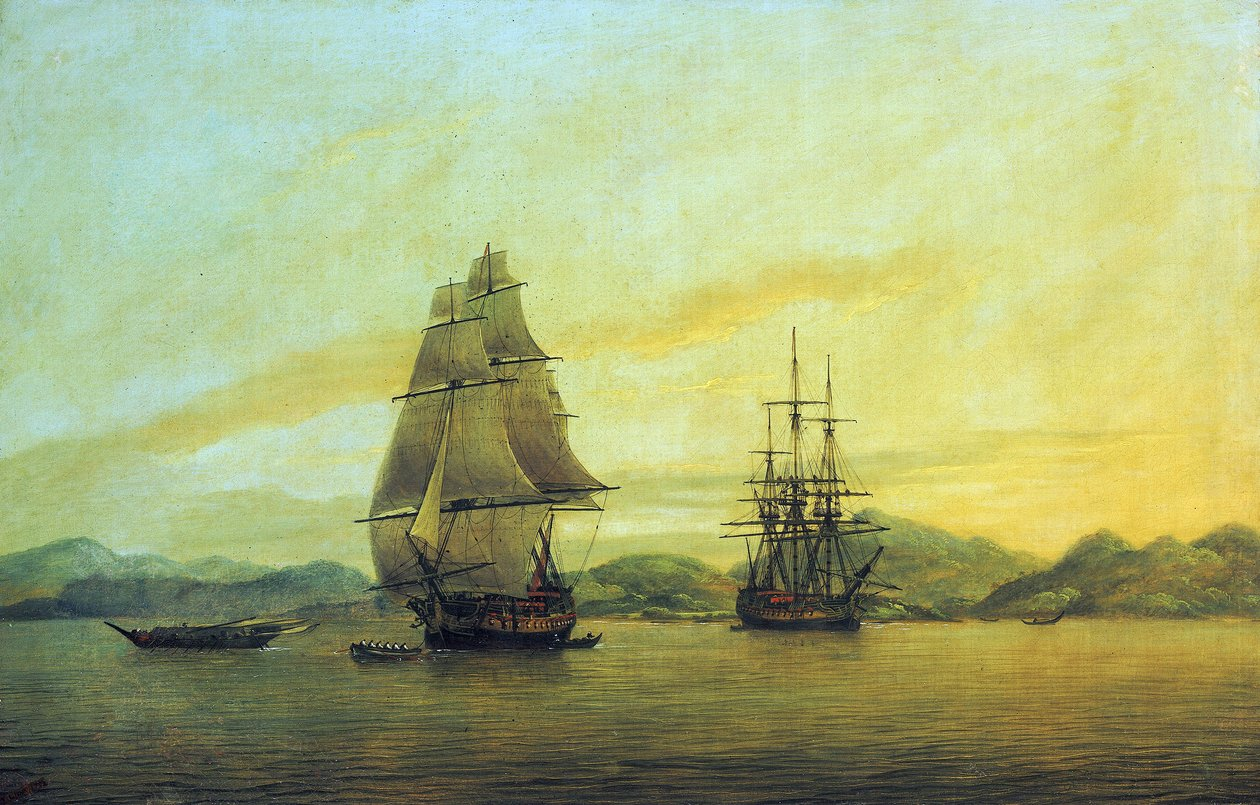
- The East Indiaman Hindostan, by Thomas Luny, National Maritime Museum

History

British East India Company
- Name: Hindostan
- Owner: Robert Williams, M.P., managing owner
- Builder: William Barnard, Deptford
- Launched: 3 November 1789
- Fate: Sold to the Royal Navy in 1795

Great Britain
- Name: HMS Hindostan
- Acquired: 1795 by purchase
- Fate: Lost following fire, Rosas Bay, Spain, 2 April 1804

General characteristics
- Class & type: Fourth rate; Storeship from December 1797
- Tons burthen: 124875/94 (Note: The writer of a letter to the Naval Chronicle criticized the measurement of tonnage. The writer stated that although Hindostan was listed as being of 1248 tons (bm), by freightage to the intended line of flotation her actual tonnage was 1890¼ tons.) (bm)
- Length: 160 ft 3 in (48.8 m) (overall); 132 ft 0 1/2 in (40.2 m)
- Beam: 42 ft 2 in (12.9 m)
- Depth of hold: 17 ft 1 in (5.2 m)
- Sail plan: Full-rigged ship
- Armament: As fourth rate; Lower deck: 28 × 18-pounder guns; Upper deck: 26 × 32-pounder carronades; Fc: 2 × 18-pounder carronades; As storeship: lower deck guns removed

HMS Hindostan (later variously Hindustan) was a 56-gun fourth-rate ship of the line of the Royal Navy. She was originally the East Indiaman Hindostan, launched in 1789, that the Admiralty bought in 1795. She is known for two events, her voyage to China between 1792 and 1794 when she carried Lord Macartney on a special embassy to China, and her loss in a fire at sea in 1804.

== East India Company ==
She was launched by William Barnard of Deptford on 3 November 1789 as Hindostan. From 17 January 1790 to 29 June 1791, under Captain William Mackintosh, she made one round trip for the East India Company to China.

She left the Downs on 17 January 1790 and was at Madeira by 31 January. She reached Madras on 2 June. From there she sailed to Penang (arriving 10 August), and Whampoa, where she arrived on 11 September. For the return trip she crossed the Second Bar on 7 January 1791, reached Cape Town on 9 April, St Helena on 28 April, and anchored in the Downs on 27 June.

The British Government then chartered her to take Lord Macartney to China in an unsuccessful attempt to open diplomatic and commercial relations with the Chinese empire. The voyage lasted from 1 October 1792 to 30 September 1794. Hindostan traveled in the company of the 64-gun HMS Lion under Captain Sir Erasmus Gower, and the brig Jackall.

Hindostan left Torbay on 1 October 1792, arrived at Madeira nine days later, and Tenerife 11 days after that. She next stopped at São Tiago on 2 November, Rio de Janeiro on 30 November, and Tristan de Cunha on 3 December. On 1 February 1793 she was at St Paul's Island, by 5 March at Batavia, by 16 May at Condore, by 26 May Cochin China, by 2 July Chusan, by 25 July she was off Teinchin, but then returned to Chusan on 2 September. She arrived at Whampoa on 11 December.

While Hindostan was at Whampoa anchorage in December there were several other East Indiamen there that on their return to Britain the Admiralty would also purchase: Ceres, Earl of Abergavenny, and Warley, and Royal Charlotte. Part of the remuneration of the captain of an Indiaman was the right to carry up to some 50 tons of cargo for his own account. Mackintosh managed to conduct private trade in Guangzhou from the voyage amounting to £7,480. The total private trade on Hindostan amounted to £9,633.

On her return trip Hindostan crossed the Second Bar on 4 February 1794, reaching St Helena on 18 June and the Downs on 7 September.

== Naval service ==
The Admiralty bought Hindostan on 9 March 1795. Barnard fitted her for service with the Royal Navy at a cost of £11,062. In April, Captain Robert Moorsom commissioned her for service in the North Sea. Captain Thomas Bertie took command in November.

On 28 January 1796, a gale of wind at Cork caused Hindostan to run into Santa Margarita, causing Santa Margarita to lose her masts, bowsprit, and rigging. Hindostan nevertheless sailed for Jamaica on 24 February 1796.

In the West Indies she participated in the operations against San Domingo. Captain Francis Collingswood took command in October 1796. She returned to England, arriving at Portsmouth in late May, having convoyed four ships; and was paid off in August 1797. She served for a year until June 1798 as a guardship at Plymouth.

In December Captain Joshua Mulock commissioned her as a 28-gun storeship for Cork. At this time she gave up her lower deck guns.

Hindostan sailed for the Mediterranean on 18 January 1800. On 20 May, she and Pearl captured the Ragusan ship Veloce and her cargo of bale goods and cochineal while Veloce was sailing from Marseilles to Petuan on the Barbary coast. Mustapha Bashaw, Dey of Algiers and named Algerian owners of the ship claimed the vessel and cargo. After the Vice-Admiralty court in Minorca had ruled the vessel and its cargo a prize the case went to appeal in England. In September 1802 the crews of Hindostan and Pearl shared £12,000, representing an advance payment of prize money.

Hindostan refitted at Deptford between November 1800 and January 1801 (for £10,292) before sailing for the Cape of Good Hope in March. By 6 May 1801 she was a storeship again, and under Captain Samuel Mottley.

On 17 September 1801 she arrived at Cape Town from Rio de Janeiro, together with Jupiter and Euphrosyne, after a voyage of about a month. Lion had escorted a convoy of East Indiamen bound for China to Rio, together with Hindostan. They had arrived there on 1 August. Captain Losack, of Jupiter, decided to accompany the convoy eastward until they were unlikely to encounter some Spanish and French vessels known to be cruising off Brazil.

In December Lieutenant William Fothergill took command. Although a storeship, Hindostan shared with Diomede, Jupiter and Braave in the capture of the Union on 27 May 1803.

Then in 1804 Commander John Le Gros replaced Fothergill. On 12 February 1804 Le Gros sailed Hindostan for the Mediterranean to carry supplies to Horatio Nelson, who was at the time Commander-in-chief of the Mediterranean fleet.

== Loss ==
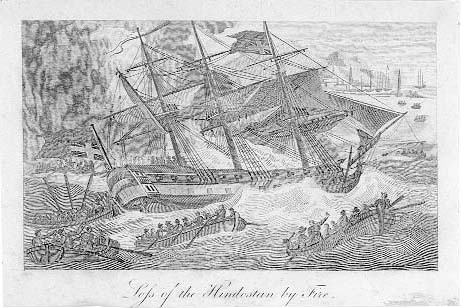
Loss of the Hindostan by fire, engraving from 1805.

Arriving at Gibraltar in March, Hindostan sailed from there to join Nelson off Toulon in company with the frigate Phoebe, but became separated from Phoebe during a gale in the Gulf of Lyons.

On the morning of 2 April, while about 30 miles to the south-east of Cape St. Sebastian, thick smoke was seen coming from the fore and main hatchways. Attempts were made to find the source of the fire but no flames could be discovered. Orders were given to throw the ship's gunpowder overboard and an unsuccessful attempt was made to flood the magazine.

Captain Le Gros had the boats prepared and hoisted out in case it became necessary to abandon ship. He also had the marines parade with loaded muskets to prevent anyone from fleeing in panic. The crew either threw overboard or dampened whatever gunpowder they could reach.

After struggling to fight the fire for about 7 hours, but when they were still 15 miles (24 km) from shore, flames suddenly erupted from the hatchways. The crew was able to run Hindostan aground in Rosas Bay, about a mile from the Fort of Ampurius and the Church of Saint Peter. By the time she beached, about 1 mile (1.6 km) from the shore, she was completely aflame. Local vessels were initially afraid to approach too closely, but using the ship's own boats and an improvised raft, the ship's passengers and crew were saved shortly before the ship blew up.

Spanish launches ferried survivors from the ship's boats to the shore. The order of rescue was women and children, ship's crew, officers, and the captain. The evacuation was orderly and no more than three men were lost of her 259 people on board, including passengers.{{|efn|One of the surviving passengers was Claudius Rich, who became an Assyriologist, business agent, traveller, and antiquarian scholar.}}

== Aftermath ==
On 19 April a court martial on board Royal Sovereign honourably acquitted Captain Le Gros, his officers, and the ship's company. The board praised Le Gros for his actions in saving so many of Hindostan's crew and passengers. Nelson himself remarked that the preservation of the crew seemed little short of a miracle. The board recommended Hindostan's acting lieutenant, Thomas Banks, to Nelson for promotion for his conduct during the wreck; his promotion to lieutenant was confirmed on 23 June 1804.

The cause of the fire was much debated. It was suggested that the fire may have been due to spontaneous combustion of hemp cordage or sails being stored when not completely dry. Nelson later wrote of the incident, "the fire must have originated from medicine chests breaking down or from wet getting down which causes things to heat. I have never read such a journal of exertions in my whole life."
