= French ship Deux Frères =

Ship of the line of the French Navy

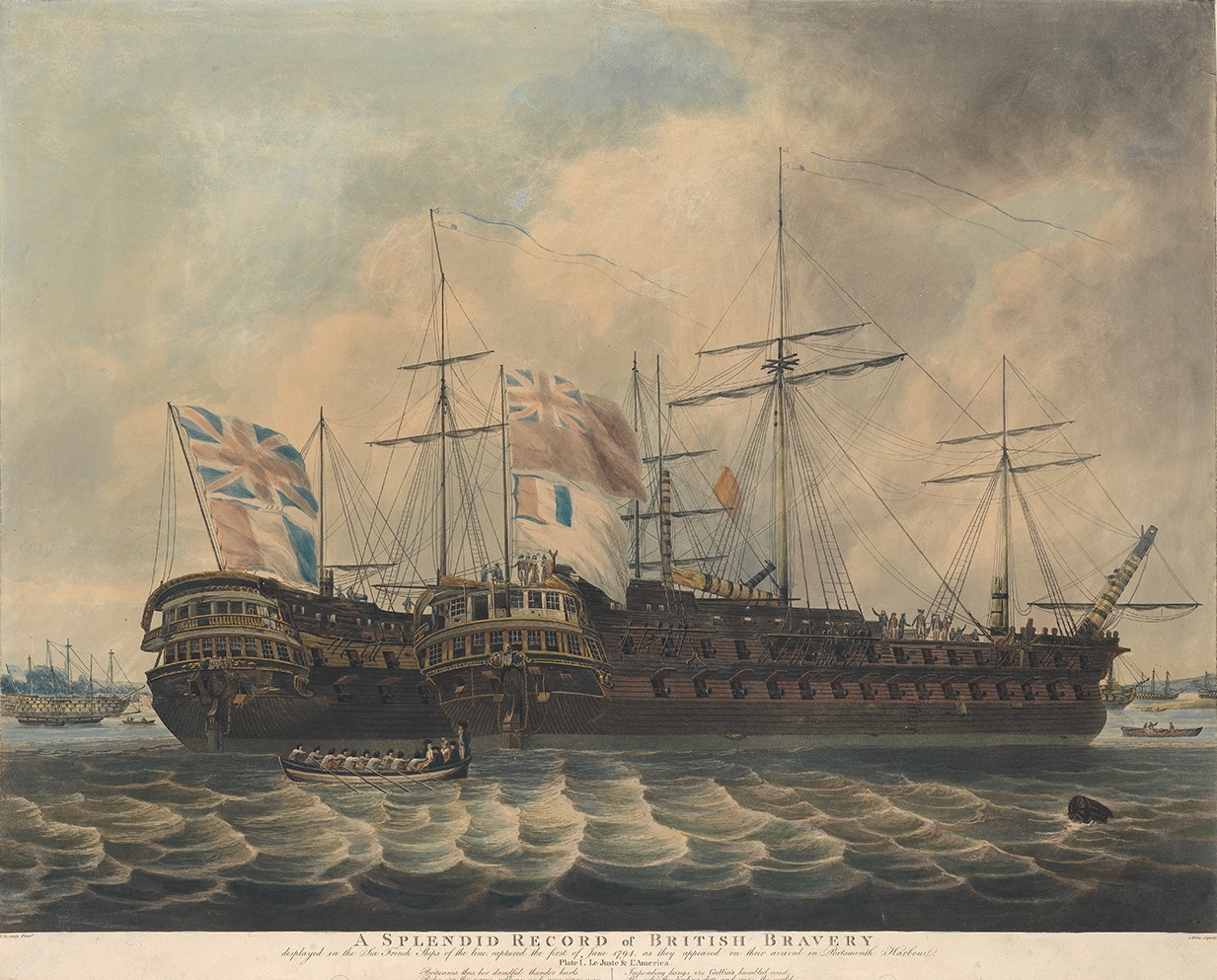
- Left: America (1788) and right: Juste after her capture in 1794.

History

France
- Name: Deux Frères
- Namesake: Louis-Stanislas-Xavier and Charles-Philippe, brothers of Louis XVI
- Builder: Brest
- Laid down: July 1782
- Launched: 17 September 1784
- Commissioned: 1785
- Renamed: Juste, 29 September 1792
- Captured: by the Royal Navy, 1 June 1794

Great Britain
- Name: Juste
- Acquired: 1 June 1794
- Fate: Broken up in 1811

General characteristics
- Type: Ship of the line
- Tons burthen: 2,143 18/94 (bm)
- Length: 193 ft 4 in (58.93 m) (gundeck); 159 ft 4 in (48.56 m) (keel)
- Beam: 50 ft 3.5 in (15.329 m)
- Draught: 22 ft 5 in (6.83 m)
- Propulsion: Sails
- Sail plan: Full-rigged ship
- Armament: 80 long guns

Deux Frères (literally Two Brothers) was an 80-gun ship of the line of the French Navy.

She was funded by a don des vaisseaux donation from the two brothers of King Louis XVI. The ship was laid down at Brest in July 1782, and launched on 17 September 1784, based on a design by Antoine Groignard, and built by Jacques-Augustin Lamothe. On 29 September 1792, she was renamed Juste.

HMS Queen Charlotte captured Juste at the battle of the Glorious First of June in 1794. Captain William Cayley commissioned her in the Royal Navy as HMS Juste in August 1795. In October Captain the Honourable Thomas Pakenham replaced Cayley and commissioned Juste for service in the Channel. Captain Sir Henry Trollope replaced Pakenham in June 1799. In 1801 she was commanded by Captains Herbert Sawyer, Richard Dacres — under whom she took part in Rear-Admiral Robert Calder's pursuit of Honoré Ganteaume's fleet to the West Indies — and Sir Edmund Nagle.

== Fate ==
In April 1802 Juste was laid up in ordinary at Plymouth. She arrived from Portsmouth on 3 April, and ran aground on the Asia Rock. She was refloated an hour later and taken in to Hamoaze. She was broken up there in February 1811.

== See also ==
- List of ships captured in the 18th century
