= Robert Winthrop (Royal Navy officer) =

Royal Navy admiral

Vice-Admiral Robert Winthrop
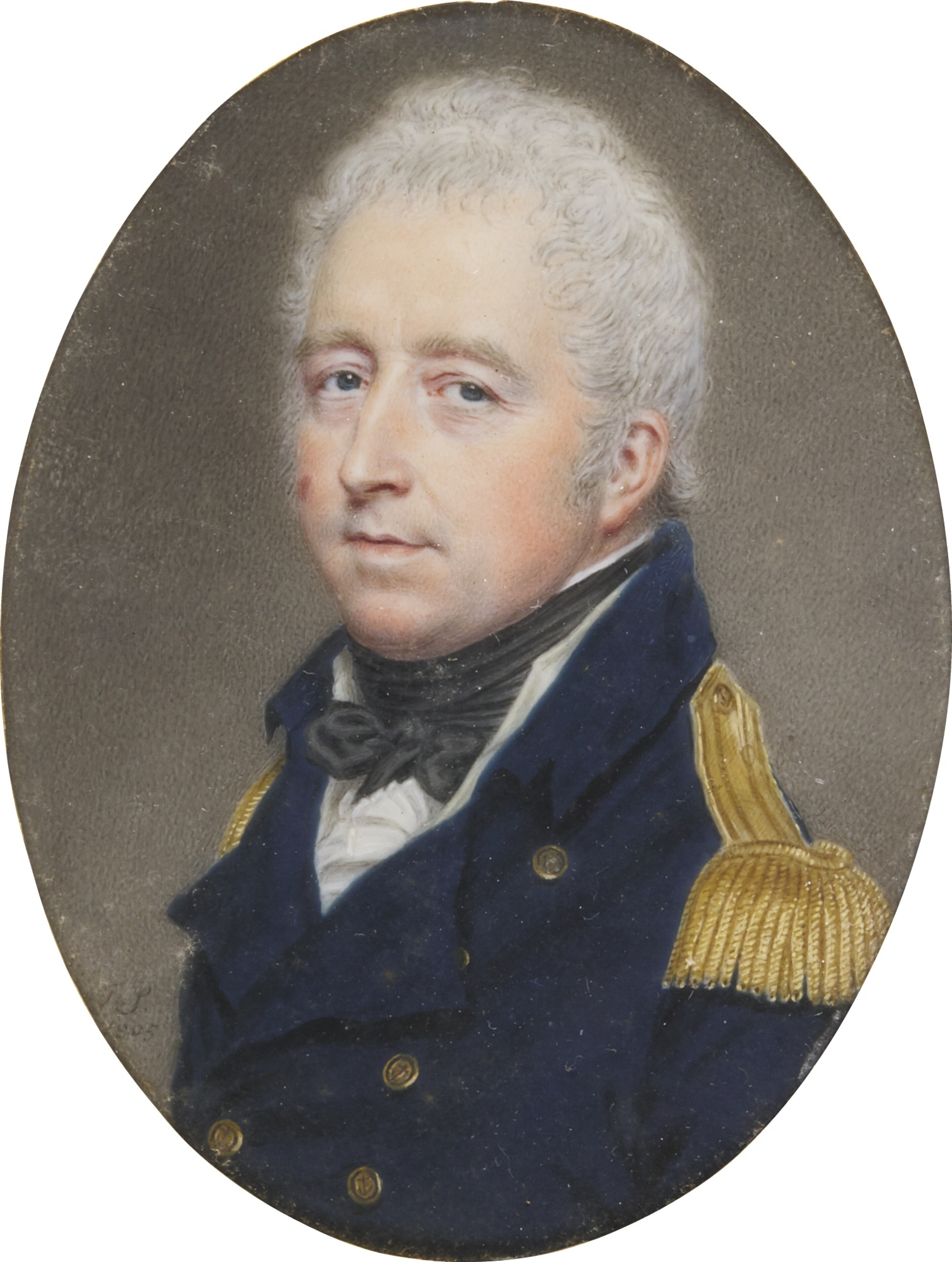
- Portrait by John Smart, 1805
- Born: 7 December 1764; New London, Connecticut
- Died: 10 May 1832 (aged 67); Dover
- Military career
- Allegiance: United Kingdom
- Branch: Royal Navy
- Service years: 1778–1832
- Rank: Vice-Admiral
- Commands: HMS Victorieuse; HMS Albacore; HMS Undaunted; HMS Circe; HMS Stag; HMS Ardent; HMS Sibylle
- Conflicts: American Revolutionary War; French Revolutionary Wars; Vlieter Incident; Napoleonic Wars

Robert Winthrop (7 December (Note: This date is from Winthrop, p. 13; Ward gives 7 September as birth date.) 1764, New London, Connecticut – 10 May 1832, Dover) was a scion of the New England Winthrop family of high colonial civil servants, and a Vice-Admiral of the Blue in the Royal Navy. Among his many feats of arms was taking possession of admiral Samuel Story's squadron of the Batavian Navy after its surrender in the Vlieter Incident. (Note: Even in reputable contemporary and historical sources his name is often misspelled Winthorp, but after cross-checking with his postings there should be no doubt)

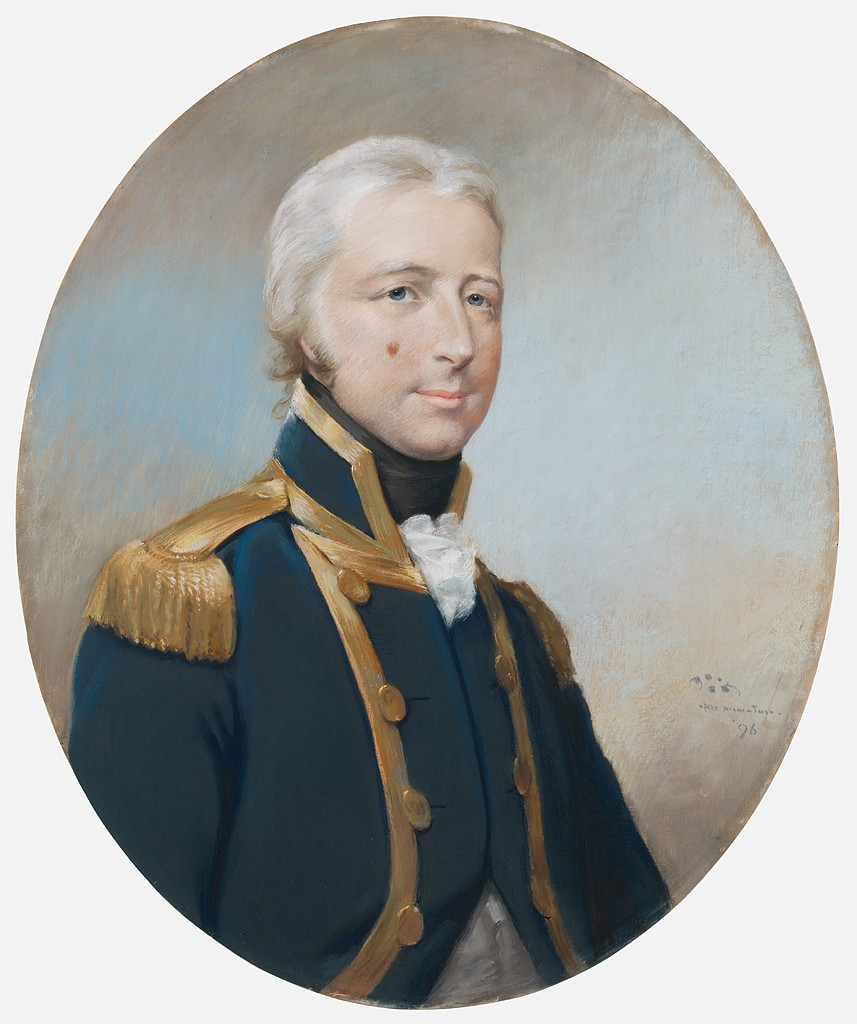
Portrait by unidentified artist, 1796

== Personal life ==
Winthrop was the youngest son of John S. Winthrop of New London, Connecticut, and Elizabeth Sheriffe Hay. He was a lineal descendant of governors John Winthrop of Massachusetts and John Winthrop the Younger of Connecticut, Chief Justice Wait Winthrop of Massachusetts, and John Winthrop (1681–1747) FRS, his grandfather.

His family evidently had Loyalist sympathies as he was entrusted to the care of a maternal uncle, attached to the British forces in New York, after the death of his father in 1778 (he crossed the line under a flag of truce to join this relative). This relative secured a place as a midshipman in the Royal Navy, where his education was completed.

Winthrop married Sarah Farbrace on 23 December 1804 in Dover. He had two sons and four daughters with her.

== Career ==
The first recorded mention of Winthrop as a midshipman is aboard admiral Rodney's flagship HMS Formidable during the Battle of the Saintes on 12 April 1782.

He was commissioned as a lieutenant (RN) in 1790 and in 1794 during the conquest of Martinique commanded a battalion of seamen attached to Prince Edward's brigade.

In the Spring of 1796 he commanded the sloop HMS Albacore at the capture of St. Lucia. The same year he captured the French privateer Athenienne near Barbados.

He then received command of HMS Undaunted, but was shipwrecked on the Morant Cays on 27 August 1796.

Winthrop received a commission as a post-captain on 16 December 1796. He received command of the frigate HMS Circe in December 1797, and was stationed in the North Sea. On 14 May 1798 HMS Circe took part in the Expedition to Ostend. Winthrop superintended the landing of troops so successfully that he was rewarded with the honor of conveying Sir Home Popham's dispatch to London.

In the Summer of 1799 Winthrop (still commanding HMS Circe) was put in charge of a squadron of frigates, comprising Jalouse, Pylades, Espiegle, and Tisiphone. On 27 June 1799 boats from these ships raided the Dutch island of Ameland, hoping to capture a number of Batavian gunboats. When this proved impossible, they cut out 12 Dutch merchantmen, lying in the roadstead, despite heavy fire from shore batteries.

In August 1799 HMS Circe was part of the fleet that supported the Anglo-Russian invasion of Holland. Together with col. Maitland and lieutenant (RN) Collier, Winthrop was sent by admiral Mitchell as a parlimentaire to admiral Story commanding the Batavian squadron lying in the Texel roadstead. Due to sloppiness of the officers conducting the pilot boat in which they approached the Dutch fleet, the British parlimentaires were able to collect important information about the state of readiness and the morale of the crews. They also appear to have conspired with several Dutch officers to influence admiral Story and to foment a mutiny among the crew of the flagship Washington, which later brought about the surrender of the squadron without firing a shot. After the surrender Winthrop took possession of the Batavian ships on behalf of admiral Mitchell in what has become known as the Vlieter Incident.

In 1800 Winthrop received command of the frigate Stag, which took part in the expedition against Ferrol, but was beached in Vigo Bay, after which she had to be destroyed by fire.

On renewal of the war after the Treaty of Amiens captain Winthrop received command of the Ship of the line HMS Ardent (64). With this ship he drove the French corvette Bayonnaise on the beach in Finisterre Bay on 28 November 1803, after which the crew burned the ship.

Around 1805 Winthrop was given command of the frigate HMS Sybille with which he captured the French privateer Oiseau in the English Channel on 3 May 1807.

In the Summer of 1807 Winthrop was put in charge of the Dover district of the Sea Fencibles. On 12 August 1819 he attained the rank of Rear-Admiral of the White. In 1830 he was promoted to Vice-Admiral of the Blue.

Winthrop died "of paralysis" on 10 May 1832 in Dover.

== Sources ==
- Marshall, J. Robert Winthrop, Esq. in Royal Naval Biography, Vol. 1, parts 1 and 2 (1823), pp. 759–761
- Ward, George Atkinson, The Journal and Letters of Samuel Curwen, an American in England, from 1775 to 1783; with an Appendix of Biographical Sketches (Boston, 1864, 4th ed.), pp. 673–675
- Winthrop, Robert C., A short account of the Winthrop family (Cambridge, Mass. 1887), pp. 13–14
