= Thomas Pitcher =

Thomas Pitcher (1745-1837) was an English ship-builder who had a shipyard in Northfleet.

Pitcher founded the Northfleet Shipyard in 1788, which he owned until 1816, when the business was taken over by his sons Henry Jones Pitcher and William Pitcher. The Northfleet Shipyard was one of the largest on the Thames, where Pitcher and Sons built East Indiamen and warships for the Royal Navy. The business also had a shipyard in Blackwall, where repairs were carried out.

Ship	Date	Type	Tonnage
Royal Charlotte	1789	East Indiaman	1252
Alligator	1793	East Indiaman	345
