= Romsø =

Island in Denmark

Coordinates: 55°30′46″N 10°47′15″E

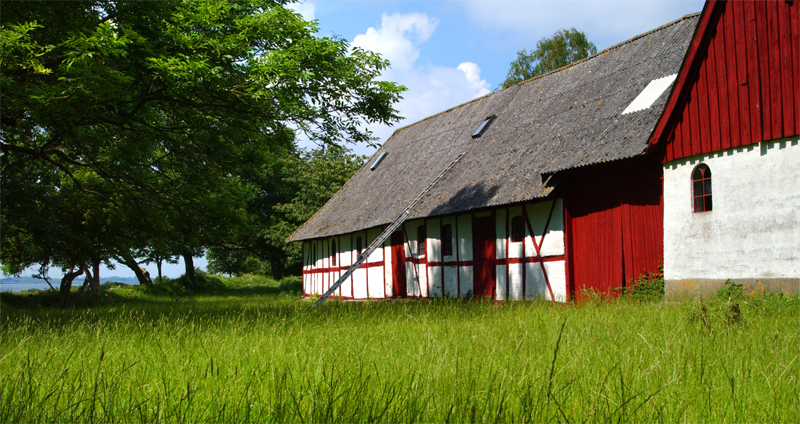
Farm on the island of Romsø

Romsø is a Danish island in the Great Belt off the coast of Funen. It has an area of 1.09 km^{2} and has, since 1996, no permanent residents. A defunct lighthouse and a few houses are located on the island; a substantial part of its area is covered by forest. The island is privately owned; although it is not closed to the general public some restrictions may apply.

Visitors may reach Romsø by a small passenger boat that departs from Kerteminde.
