= William Cayley (Royal Navy officer) =

Captain William Cayley
- Born: 5 May 1742; York
- Died: 3 January 1801 (aged 58); Chatham
- Spouse: Martha Ward
- Children: 2 legitimate 5 illegitimate
- Military career
- Allegiance: Kingdom of Great Britain
- Branch: Royal Navy
- Service years: c.1762–1801
- Rank: Captain
- Commands: HMS Harpy; HMS Edgar; HMS Unicorn; HMS Juste; HMS Invincible
- Conflicts: American Revolutionary War; Battle of Cape Spartel; French Revolutionary War; Invasion of Trinidad

Captain William Cayley (5 May 1742 – 3 January 1801) was a British Royal Navy officer.

== Family and early life ==
William Cayley was the fourth son of Sir George Cayley (1707–1791), the fourth of the Cayley baronets. He was christened at St Michael le Belfrey, York on 5 May 1742.

== Naval career ==
William Cayley was commissioned a lieutenant in 1762. In 1781 he was appointed commander and captain of HMS Harpy. The following year he was appointed captain of HMS Edgar and saw action against a Franco-Spanish fleet in the indecisive Battle of Cape Spartel.

In 1794 he was captain of the newly commissioned HMS Unicorn. The following year he commissioned HMS Juste, a captured French ship, and commanded her for two months. He then took command of HMS Invincible. Over the next few years he escorted convoys and engaged in various battles with the French. In May 1796 he captured Alexandre off Madeira, and freed the Portuguese ship Signior Montcalm, which Alexandre had previously captured. The Royal Navy subsequently took her into service as HMS Alexander. In December that year he was involved in an attack on the French fleet off Dominica. In 1797 he was present when Trinidad was surrendered to the British. In 1799 he was in the British fleet that received the surrender of Suriname.

== Death ==
He died at Chatham, Kent on 3 January 1801.
