= HMS Athenienne (1796) =

Brig of the Royal Navy

History

France
- Name: Athénienne
- Acquired: April 1796
- Captured: May 1796

Great Britain
- Name: HMS Athenienne
- Acquired: May 1796 by capture
- Fate: Sold 1802

General characteristics
- Tons burthen: 150, or 202 (bm)
- Armament: 14 guns

HMS Athenienne was a brig, probably a French privateer that the French Navy requisitioned circa April 1796, but that the British captured off Barbados and commissioned later that year before selling her in 1802.

On 3 May 1796 HMS Albacore captured the French corvette Athénienne off Barbados at 14°42′N 47°39′W after a 14-hour long chase. Athénienne was armed with 14 guns and had a crew of 83 men under the command of lieutenant de vaisseau Gervais. She had thrown 10 of her guns overboard during the chase. The Royal Navy took her into service as HMS Athénienne.
