= HMS Invincible (1765) =

Ship of the line of the Royal Navy

- Invincible

History

Great Britain
- Name: HMS Invincible
- Ordered: 4 November 1761
- Builder: Wells, Deptford
- Launched: 9 March 1765
- Fate: Wrecked, 16 March 1801
- Notes: Participated in: Battle of Cape St. Vincent; Battle of the Chesapeake; Battle of St. Kitts; Glorious First of June

General characteristics
- Class & type: Ramillies-class ship of the line
- Tons burthen: 1631
- Length: 168 ft 6 in (51.36 m) (gundeck)
- Beam: 46 ft 11 in (14.30 m)
- Depth of hold: 19 ft 9 in (6.02 m)
- Propulsion: Sails
- Sail plan: Full-rigged ship
- Armament: 74 guns: Gundeck: 28 × 32 pdrs; Upper gundeck: 28 × 18 pdrs; Quarterdeck: 14 × 9 pdrs; Forecastle: 4 × 9 pdrs

HMS Invincible was a 74-gun third-rate ship of the line of the Royal Navy, launched on 9 March 1765 at Deptford. Invincible was built during a period of peace to replace ships worn out in the recently concluded Seven Years' War. The ship went on to serve in the American War of Independence. May, 1778 under command of Capt. Anthony Parry. Fought at the battles of Cape St Vincent in 1780, and under the command of Captain Charles Saxton, the Battles of the Chesapeake in 1781 and St Kitts in 1782.

She survived the cull of the Navy during the next period of peace, and was present, under the command of Thomas Pakenham, at the Glorious First of June in 1794, where she was badly damaged and lost fourteen men, and, under the command of William Cayley, the Invasion of Trinidad (1797), which resulted in the transfer of Trinidad from the Spanish.

Quasi War:In 1800 she recaptured American merchantman Richmond that had been taken by a French privateer.

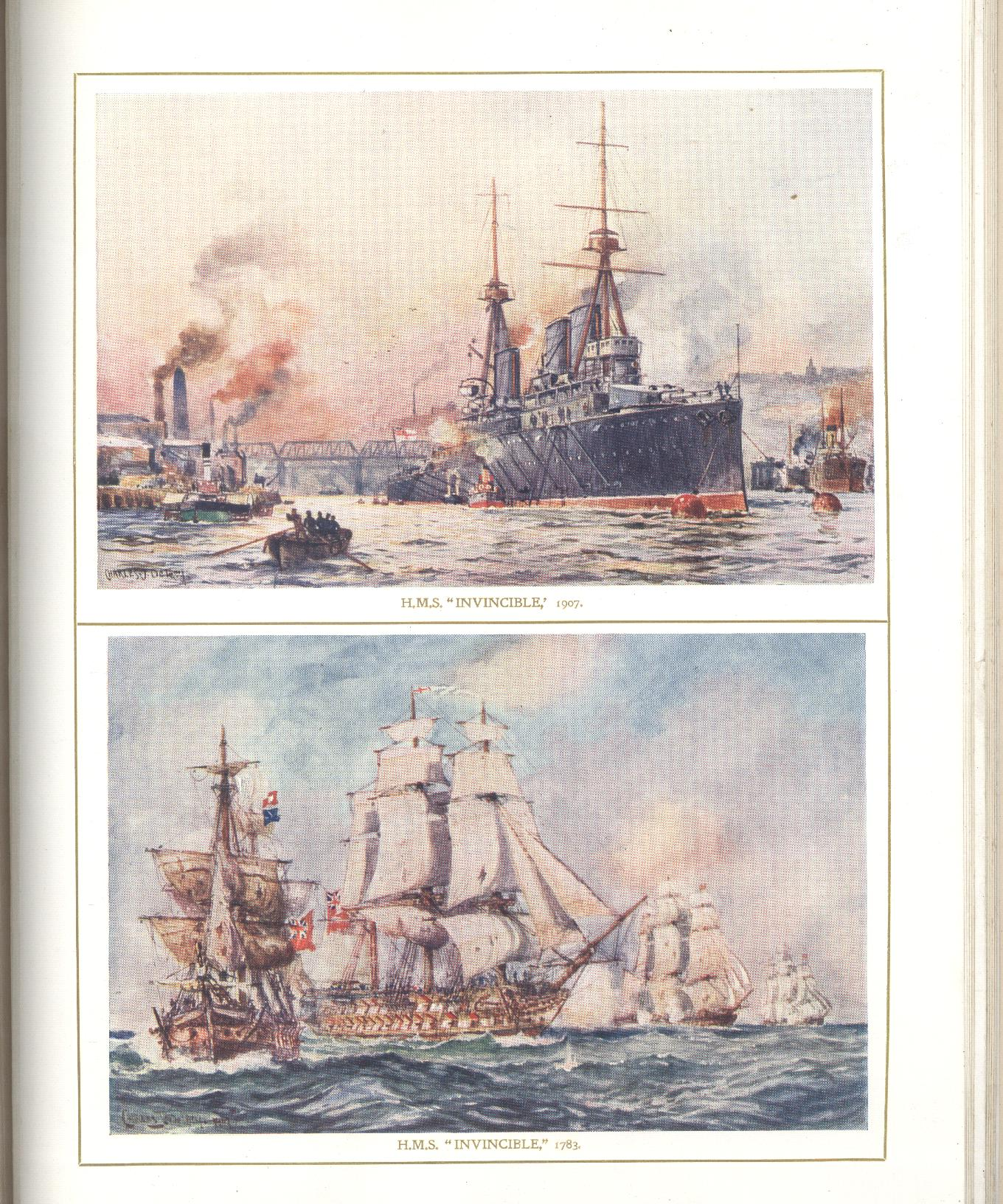
A watercolor by Charles de Lacy depicting the ship of the line Invincible and the battlecruiser Invincible, 120 years apart.

== Captains ==
Captains of the ship included:

- November 1776: Hyde Parker
- February 1778: Anthony Parrey
- 1779: John Laforey
- July 1779: Samuel Pitchford Cornish
- April 1780: George Falconer
- February 1781: Richard Bickerton
- May 1781: Charles Saxton
- May 1793: Thomas Pakenham
- December 1795: William Cayley
- February 1801: John Rennie

== Shipwreck ==
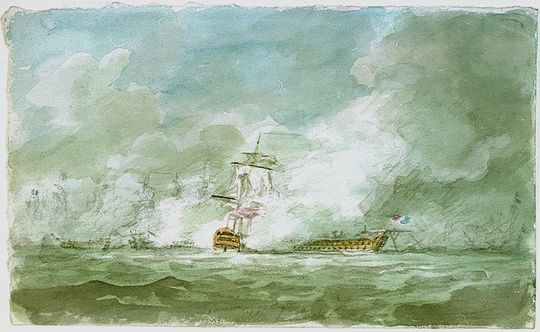
HMS Invincible

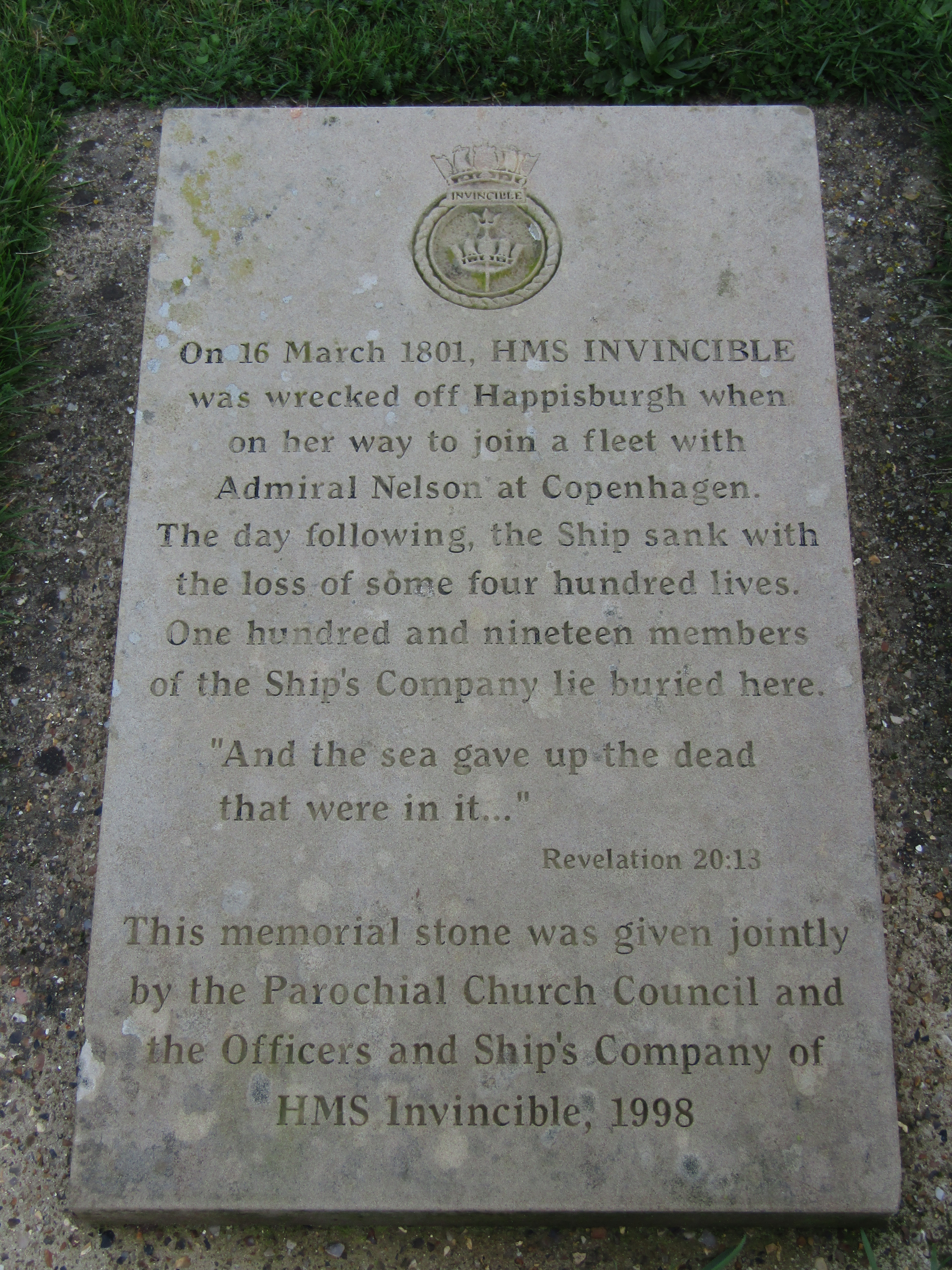
Memorial in Happisburgh churchyard

On 16 March 1801, she was lost in a shipwreck off the coast of Norfolk, England. She had been sailing from Yarmouth under the flag of Rear-Admiral Thomas Totty in an effort to reach the fleet of Admiral Sir Hyde Parker in the Sound preparing for the upcoming attack on the Danish fleet, with approximately 650 people on board. As the ship passed the Norfolk coast, she was caught in heavy wind and stuck on the Hammond's Knoll sandbank off Happisburgh, where she was pinned for some hours in the afternoon before breaking free but immediately being grounded on a sandbank, where the effect of wind and waves tore down the masts and began to break up the ship. She remained in that position for all of the following day, but late in the evening drifted off the sandbank and sank in deep water.

The admiral and 195 sailors escaped the wreck, either in one of the ship's boats or were picked up by a passing collier and fishing boat, but over 400 of their shipmates drowned in the disaster, most of them once the ship began to sink in deeper water. Admiral Totty was rescued by HMRC Lively.

The compulsory court martial investigating the incident, held on Ruby in Sheerness, absolved the admiral and the captain (posthumously) of culpability in the disaster, posthumously blaming the harbour pilot and the ship's master, both of whom had been engaged to steer the ship through the reefs and shoals of the dangerous region, and should have known the location of Hammond Knoll, especially since it was daytime and in sight of land.

The remains of many of her crew were located by chance in a mass grave in Happisburgh churchyard during the digging of a new drainage channel. A memorial stone was erected in 1998 to their memory by the Ship's Company of the Royal Navy aircraft carrier HMS Invincible, and by the Happisburgh parochial church council.
