= George Burlton =

Royal Navy admiral (died 1815)

Rear-Admiral Sir George Burlton KCB
- Died: 21 September 1815
- Military career
- Allegiance: United Kingdom
- Branch: Royal Navy
- Service years: 1777–1815
- Rank: Rear-Admiral
- Commands: HMS Camel; HMS Lively; HMS Vengeance; HMS Saldanha; HMS Success; HMS Adamant; HMS Resolution; HMS Ville de Paris; HMS Boyne; East Indies Station
- Conflicts: French Revolutionary Wars; Napoleonic Wars
- Awards: Knight Commander of the Order of the Bath

Rear-Admiral Sir George Burlton KCB (died 21 September 1815) was an officer of the Royal Navy during the Napoleonic Wars.

== Naval career ==
Burlton was commissioned as a Lieutenant on 15 September 1777 and in 1783 was in command of HMS Camel, 24. He was made Commander on 5 July 1794.

In March 1795 he was acting captain of the 32-gun frigate Lively when she captured the French corvette Tourtourelle, and he was promoted to post captain on 16 March that year into the 74-gun HMS Vengeance. Towards the end of 1796 he travelled to Cape Town. There in November he received command of the Dutch frigate Castor, which the British had captured at the capitulation of Saldanha Bay and renamed HMS Saldanha. Burlton sailed her to Britain where she was paid off.

Subsequent commands included Success, 32; Adamant, 50; and Resolution, 74, the last of which he commanded at the Battle of the Basque Roads in April 1809. In the summer of 1809 he was called as a witness at the Court-martial of James, Lord Gambier which assessed whether Admiral Lord Gambier had failed to support Captain Lord Cochrane at the battle. Gambier was controversially cleared of all charges.

In 1812 Burlton was captain of the 110-gun HMS Ville de Paris and in March 1813 he was given command of HMS Boyne, 98. On 4 December 1813 he was made a Colonel of Marines.

On 13 February 1814 Boyne engaged the French ship-of-the-line Romulus, for which Burlton was commended by Vice-Admiral Sir Edward Pellew. On 4 June 1814 Burlton was raised to flag rank as a Rear-Admiral of the White and on 2 January 1815 he was made a Knight Commander of the Order of the Bath.

On 24 December 1814 Sir Samuel Hood died. He had been Commander-in-Chief on the East Indies Station and when the vacancy became known in England Sir George Burlton was appointed to succeed him. He hoisted his flag in HMS Cornwallis, Captain John Bayley, on 10 January 1815. On the voyage out the American sloops-of-war USS Peacock and USS Hornet mistook the 74-gun Cornwallis for a merchant ship. Cornwallis pursued Hornet between 28 and 30 April without success, though Hornet was obliged to jettison all her guns and arms in order to escape. Burlton took over the East Indies command from acting-Commodore George Sayer in June 1815, but died at Madras on 21 September. Sayer resumed command until the arrival of Sir Richard King in 1816.

Military offices
Preceded by George Sayer	Commander-in-Chief, East Indies Station; 1814–1815	Succeeded by George Sayer
