= Action of 2 September 1781 =

1781 action of the American Revolutionary War

- Part of the American Revolutionary War
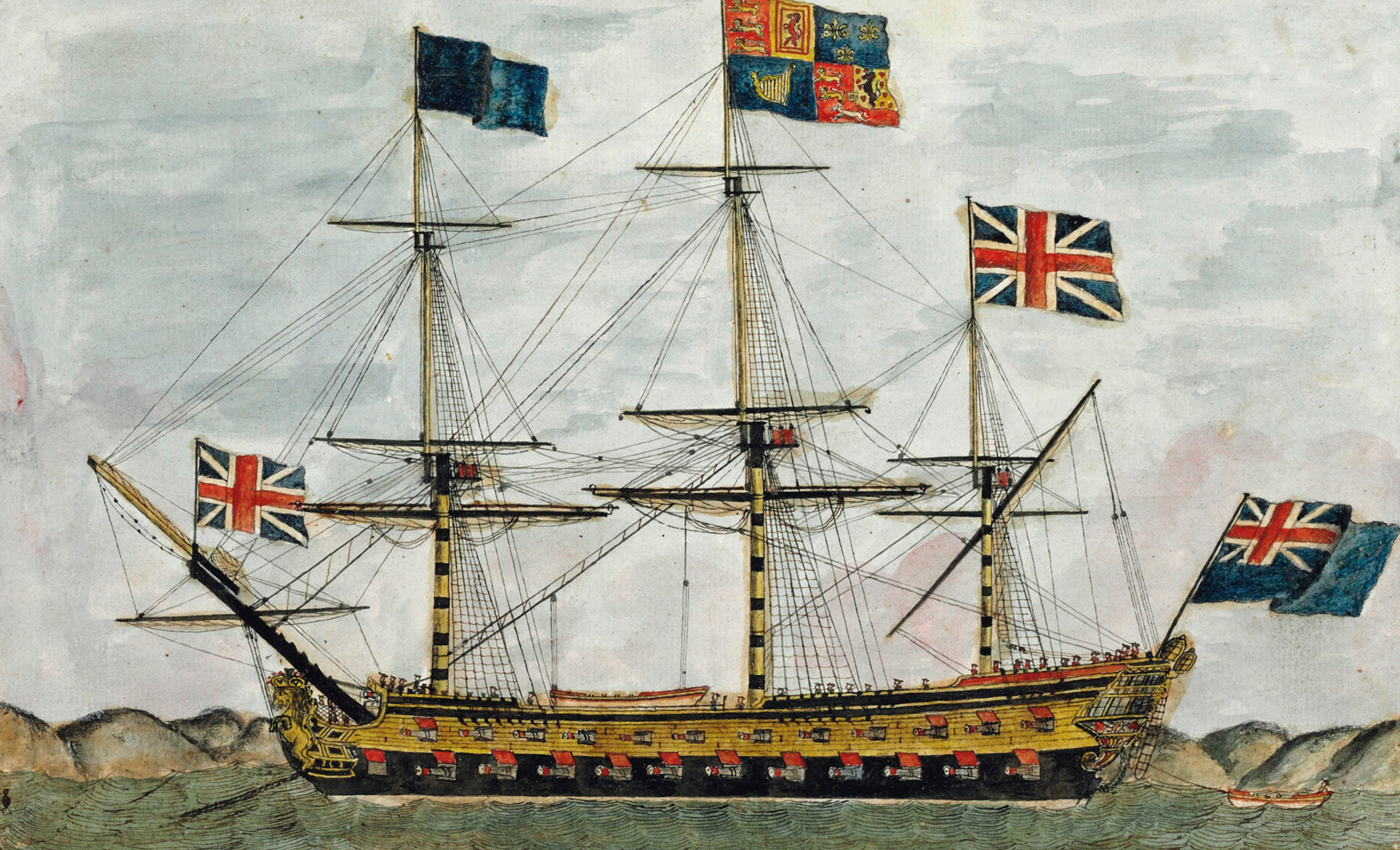
- HMS Chatham, which captured Magicienne in the action
Date	2 September 1781
Location	Off Cape Ann, Atlantic Ocean
Result	British victory

Belligerents
Great Britain	France

Commanders and leaders
Andrew Snape Douglas	Louis-Josué Janvre de la Bouchetière (surrendered)

Strength
1 ship of the line	1 frigate

Casualties and losses
1 killed 1 wounded	86–155 killed or wounded 1 frigate captured

The action of 2 September 1781 was a minor naval engagement fought off Cape Ann during the American War of Independence; HMS Chatham captured the French frigate Magicienne after a fight of a few hours. On 2 September, the British fifty gun fourth-rate Chatham under Captain Andrew Snape Douglas was cruising off Cape Ann near Boston harbour and spotted the French frigate Magicienne, escorting a merchantman. She was a thirty six gun 800 ton frigate that was serving in comte d'Orvilliers fleet and was commanded by Captain Janvre de la Bouchetière with 280 men.

Douglas ordered action stations, and Chatham hove to and after a few hours chase opened the action; she overtook the French frigate. The London Gazette claims that after an hour's action, Chatham got the better of the French and Magicienne soon struck; The New York gazette of 22 October 1781 gives a figure of 2 hours and a half, of which half at pistol range, and Magicienne only struck after her rudder and bowsprit were shot away.

Chatham had one man killed and one wounded while losses on the Magicienne were heavy; the London Gazette gives a figure of 32 killed and 54 wounded, while the New York Gazette states that 155 were killed or wounded, including Ensign Dethan, killed, and Captain de la Bouchetière, wounded. The rest of the crew was taken prisoner. She was subsequently taken to Halifax and recommissioned in the Royal Navy as HMS Magicienne.

Sagittaire, Astrée and Hermione, which were anchored at Boston, scrambled in an attempt to support Magicienne, but they failed to arrive on time, and Chatham could escape with her prize. The merchantman that Magicienne was escorting managed to escape Chatham and arrived safely in a French-held harbour. Subsequently, the action thwarted a planned French assault on British ships in the Saint John River.
