= French ship Magicienne =

At least three ships of the French Navy have borne the name Magicienne, after magicienne (feminine of magician):

- Magicienne (1778), a 32-gun ship, captured by HMS Chatham off Boston in 1781 and taken into service as HMS Magicienne. She was burnt to avoid capture in 1810.
- Magicienne (1823), a 40-gun ship wrecked in 1840.
- Magicienne (1845), a frigate converted to steam power in the late 1850s
