= Governor Brisbane =

Governor Brisbane may refer to:

- Charles Brisbane (1769–1829), Governor of St. Vincent from 1808 to 1829
- Thomas Brisbane (1773–1860), Governor of New South Wales from 1821 to 1825
