= Castor (ship) =

Several vessels have been named Castor for Castor, a star in the constellation Gemini:

- Castor (1782 ship) was a merchantman launched in 1782. She made one voyage for the British East India Company (EIC). Her owners sold her in 1799. She was last listed in 1808.
- Castor (1786 ship) was built at Delfshaven and launched in 1786. The British captured her at the capitulation of Saldanha Bay in August 1796. Because there was already an HMS Castor, they renamed her HMS Saldanha. After she arrived at Plymouth the Royal Navy fitted her as a receiving ship in November 1797; she was sold in 1806.

== See also ==
- HMS Castor – any one of four vessels of the Royal Navy
