= HMS Lacedemonian (1796) =

Brig of the Royal Navy

History

France
- Name: Lacédémonienne
- Namesake: Sparta
- Launched: 1794
- Captured: 9 March 1796

Great Britain
- Name: HMS Lacedemonian
- Acquired: 9 March 1796 by capture
- Captured: 6 April 1797

General characteristics
- Type: Brig
- Tons burthen: 195 (bm)
- Propulsion: Sails
- Armament: 12 guns

HMS Lacedemonian (or Lacedaemonian) was the French brig Lacédémonienne, launched in 1793, that the British captured in 1796 near Barbados. She was at the capture of Saint Lucia in May of the next year, but the French re-captured her a year after that.

== Capture ==
Pique and Charon captured Lacedemonian on 9 March 1796 to the windward of Barbados. She was described as a privateer brig of 14 guns and 90 men. (Note: Head money was paid in 1804. An able (or other) seaman's share was worth 10s 2d.) The British took her into service and commissioned her in May under the command of the newly promoted Commander George Sayer.

== Service ==
She was part of the expeditionary force under Lieutenant-General Sir Ralph Abercromby and Rear-Admiral Sir Hugh C. Christian at the capture of the island of Saint Lucia in May 1796. Commander Thomas Boys replaced Sayer and he sailed Lacedemonian to Martinique. Boys received promotion to post-captain on 3 July 1796. His replacement was Commander Thomas Harvey. In October Lacedemonian was in company with Berbice sailing between Martinique and Dominica when they separated during a dark, wet night on 26 October. Berbice wrecked on Scotsman's Head, Dominica.

Shortly thereafter Harvey transferred to Pelican. Commander Matthew Wrench took command on 27 March 1797.

== Fate ==
Lacedemonian was under Wrench's command when the French captured her on 6 April 1797. She was patrolling near Point Salines, Grenada, when she encountered a sloop. Lacedemonian gave chase for much of the day, when towards late afternoon another sloop appeared and started to chase Lacedomonian, while firing some random shots from long range. Lacedemonium gave up her chase and turned her attention towards her pursuer. Eventually, the newcomer caught up and Wrench stopped, with his crew at quarters. The newcomer did not display a flag but replied to queries in English. Lacedemonian's crew relaxed, so when the newcomer sent over a boat with armed men, and ran into Lacedemonian, they were taken by surprise. Wrench tried to organize resistance but the attackers knocked him down and took over the brig. The subsequent court martial ordered a severe reprimand for Wrench for having allowed himself to be caught unprepared.
