= Action of 23 August 1806 =

1806 battle of the Napoleonic Wars

- Part of the Caribbean campaign of 1803–1810
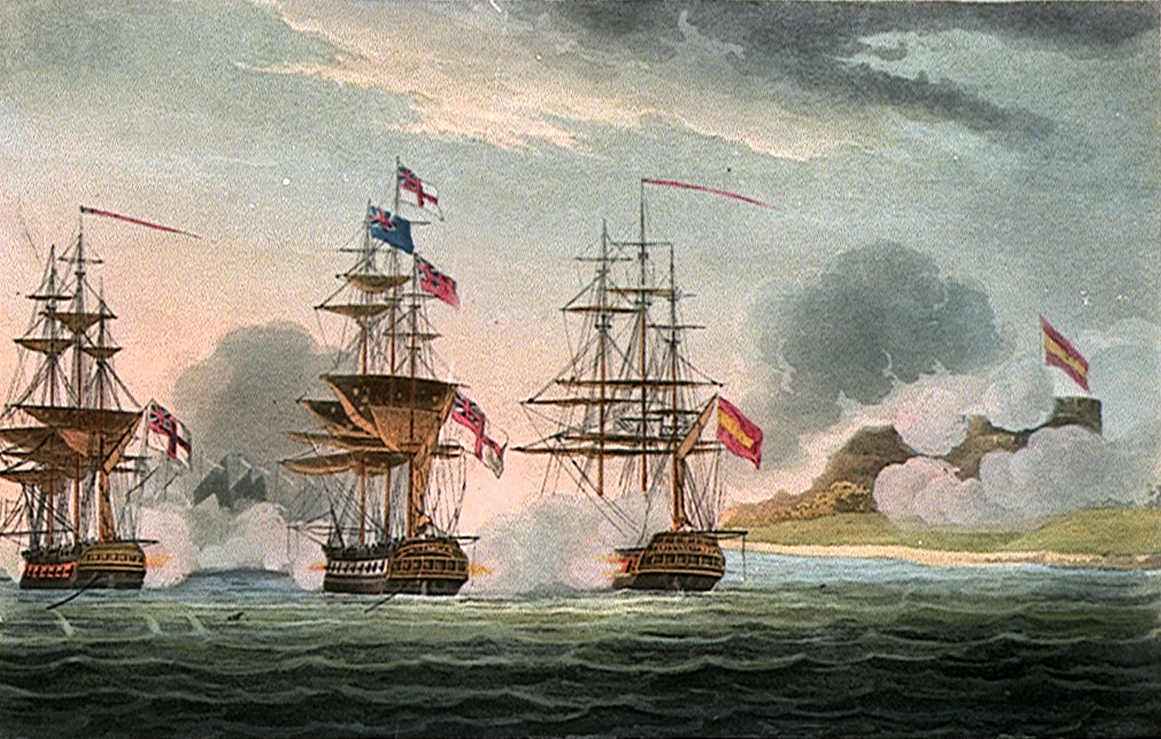
- Capture of the Pomona by Anson & Arethusa off Havannah, 23 Aug 1806; Thomas Whitcombe
Date	23 August 1806
Location	Off Havana, Caribbean Sea
Result	British victory

Belligerents
United Kingdom	Spain

Commanders and leaders
Charles Lydiard; Charles Brisbane	Pedro Pablo de Sanguineto y Basso †

Strength
2 frigates	1 frigate 12 gunboats 1 shore battery

Casualties and losses
2 killed 32 wounded	317 captured 1 frigate captured 6 gunboats captured 3 gunboats destroyed

The action of 23 August 1806 was a minor naval battle of the Napoleonic Wars fought between the British and Spanish off Havana, Cuba. In the engagement, the Spanish frigate Pomona was captured by the British frigates HMS Anson and HMS Arethusa under the commands of Captain Charles Lydiard and Charles Brisbane respectively. As well as the frigate being captured, a shore battery was silenced and a fleet of gunboats was defeated.

== Background ==
The Royal Navy dominated the West Indies region after the French defeat at San Domingo. The Spanish had been on the defensive due to the diminished French naval power and the subsequent blockade of Cádiz, which had been made possible by the battle of Trafalgar. Lydiard was appointed to command the 38-gun HMS Anson in 1805. Anson had originally been a 64-gun third rate, but had been razeed in 1794. He sailed Anson to the West Indies in early 1806 and in August was sailing in company with Captain Charles Brisbane's HMS Arethusa when on 23 August they came across the 38-gun Spanish frigate Pomona off Havana, guarded by a shore battery and twelve gunboats.

== Action ==
The Pomona attempted to enter the harbour whereupon Lydiard and Brisbane bore up and engaged her. The gunboats came out to defend her, whereupon the two British frigates anchored between the shore battery and gunboats on one side, and the Pomona on the other. A hard fought action began, lasting for 35 minutes until the Pomona struck her colours. Three of the gunboats were blown up, six were sunk, and the remaining three were badly damaged. Some of the Spanish were rescued in all total of 317 were captured many of them wounded. The shore battery ceased fire after an explosion damaged it.

== Aftermath ==
There were no casualties aboard Anson, but Arethusa lost two killed and 32 wounded, with Brisbane among the latter. The captured Pomona was subsequently taken into the Navy as HMS Cuba. Charles Brisbane would later take the Dutch island of Curaçao in January 1807, using Anson to achieve that goal.
