= Andrew Snape Douglas =

Royal Navy officer (1761–1797)

Captain Sir Andrew Snape Douglas
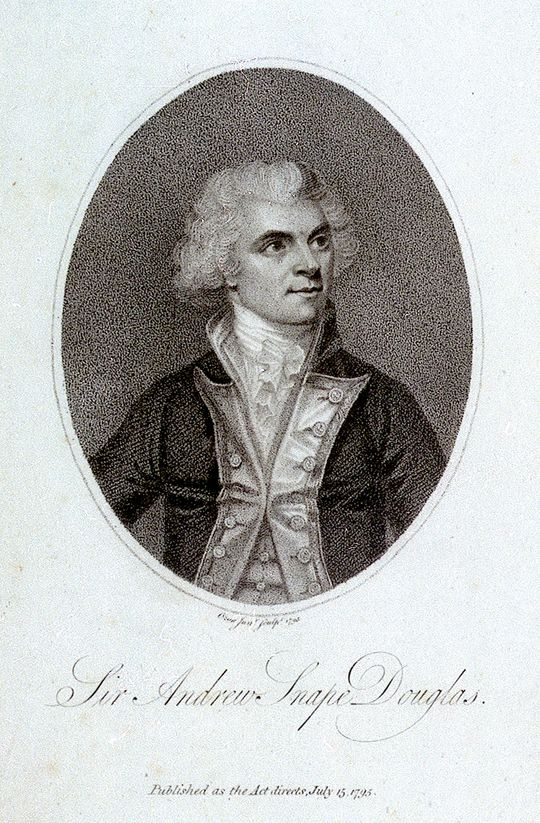
- Born: 8 October 1761; Edinburgh, Scotland
- Died: 4 June 1797 (aged 35)
- Relatives: Sir Andrew Hamond, 1st Baronet (uncle)
- Military career
- Allegiance: Great Britain
- Branch: Royal Navy
- Service years: 1770–1797
- Rank: Captain
- Commands: HMS Roebuck; HMS Chatham; HMS Alcide; HMS Southampton; HMS Goliath; HMS Phaeton; HMS Queen Charlotte
- Conflicts: American War of Independence; Siege of Charleston; French Revolutionary Wars; Glorious First of June; Battle of Groix
- Awards: Knight Bachelor

Captain Sir Andrew Snape Douglas (8 October 1761 – 4 June 1797) was a Royal Navy officer who served in the American War of Independence and French Revolutionary Wars.

== Family and early life ==
Andrew Snape Douglas was born in Edinburgh on 8 October 1761, the son of Dr. William Douglas, a medical doctor from Springfield in Fife, and Lydia Hamond, daughter of a London merchant and shipowner. William Douglas's death in 1770 led Andrew to sign on that year aboard his maternal uncle Sir Andrew Snape Hamond's ship, the 32-gun frigate HMS Arethusa. The two sailed to North America, and after spending time along the coast, Douglas moved to the West Indies. With the outbreak of the American War of Independence in 1775 he returned to North America and rejoined his uncle, now commanding the 44-gun HMS Roebuck. He received his commission as a lieutenant on 23 April 1778, and was made master and commander on 16 February 1780. He was to have been appointed to the armed ship Germain, but instead took command of a floating battery, and was present at the Siege of Charleston. He was subsequently promoted to post-captain on 15 May 1780 and appointed to the command of the captured American frigate USS Providence. Instead he had in April 1780 become commander of the Roebuck, then serving as the flagship of Vice-Admiral Mariot Arbuthnot. He went on to capture the American ships USS Confederacy on 14 April 1781 and Protector on 5 May. He was succeeded in the command of the Roebuck by Captain John Orde in July 1781.

== Command ==
The Roebuck was ordered home in July 1781, but Douglas remained in American waters, having been given command of the 54-gun HMS Chatham. He was employed in a senior position in Admiral Thomas Graves's fleet owing to his extensive knowledge of the American coasts. He was subsequently given command of a squadron of frigates and went on to enjoy considerable success in a number of cruises. Among his captures was the 32-gun French frigate Magicienne on 2 September 1781, an action that thwarted a planned French assault on British ships in the St John River. He then proceeded to end the Raid on Lunenburg, Nova Scotia (1782).

Douglas returned to England after the end of the war, initially spending time at Chatham Dockyard studying naval architecture, before going to sea again, mostly serving in the Mediterranean and the English Channel. Douglas commanded the 74-gun third rate HMS Alcide from October 1787 during the period of the Spanish Armament. He was in command of the 32-gun HMS Southampton, which had been appointed the guard ship at Weymouth, when the town was visited by King George III. Douglas conducted the King on his first voyage aboard a warship, and on 13 September 1789 King George appointed Douglas a knight bachelor. Also in 1789 Douglas and his uncle Snape Hamond were members of the court for the court martial of the mutineers of the Bounty. Douglas was then in command of the 74-gun HMS Goliath from 1790.

== French Revolutionary Wars ==
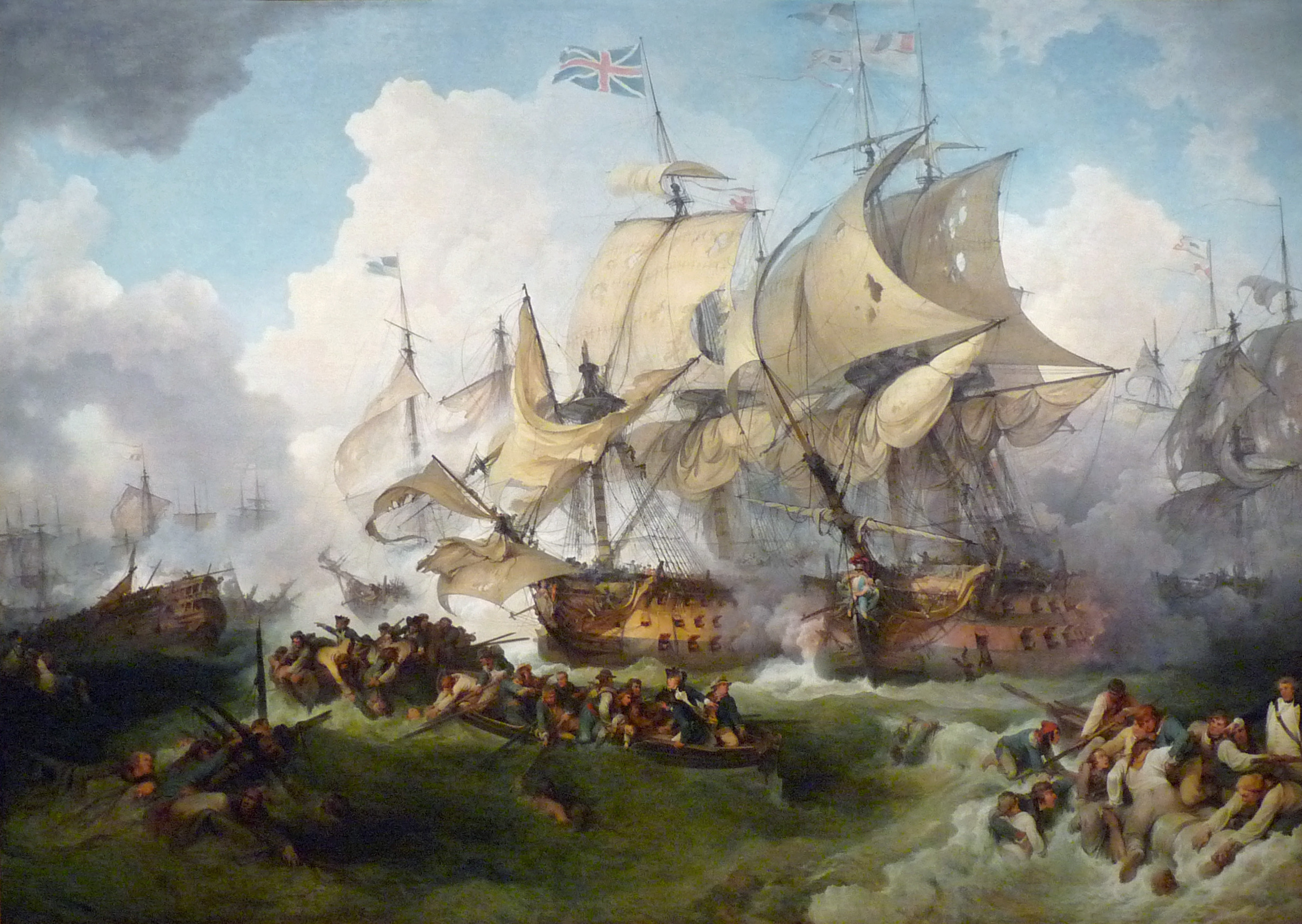
HMS Queen Charlotte (centre) under Douglas's command at the Glorious First of June

The outbreak of the French Revolutionary Wars in February 1793 led to Douglas being appointed to command the 38-gun frigate HMS Phaeton. He went on to capture five enemy vessels that year, and was involved in the capture of a French privateer and her prize, the Spanish galleon St Jago. Lord Howe arranged for Douglas to be commodore in charge of the fleet's frigates, occasionally sending him on detached cruises. He moved aboard Howe's flagship, the 100-gun first rate HMS Queen Charlotte on 8 April 1794, apparently through the auspices of both his uncle and the First Lord of the Admiralty, John Pitt, 2nd Earl of Chatham. Now serving as Howe's flag captain Douglas fought at the Glorious First of June, sustaining a severe wound to the head but refusing to leave the deck. He was appointed a Colonel of Marines on 1 June 1795 and remained as captain of the Queen Charlotte after Howe was succeeded by Lord Bridport. He commanded his ship at the Battle of Groix in 1795, earning private praise for his courage in leading his ship whilst heavily outnumbered, but little public reward.

== Personal life and later years ==
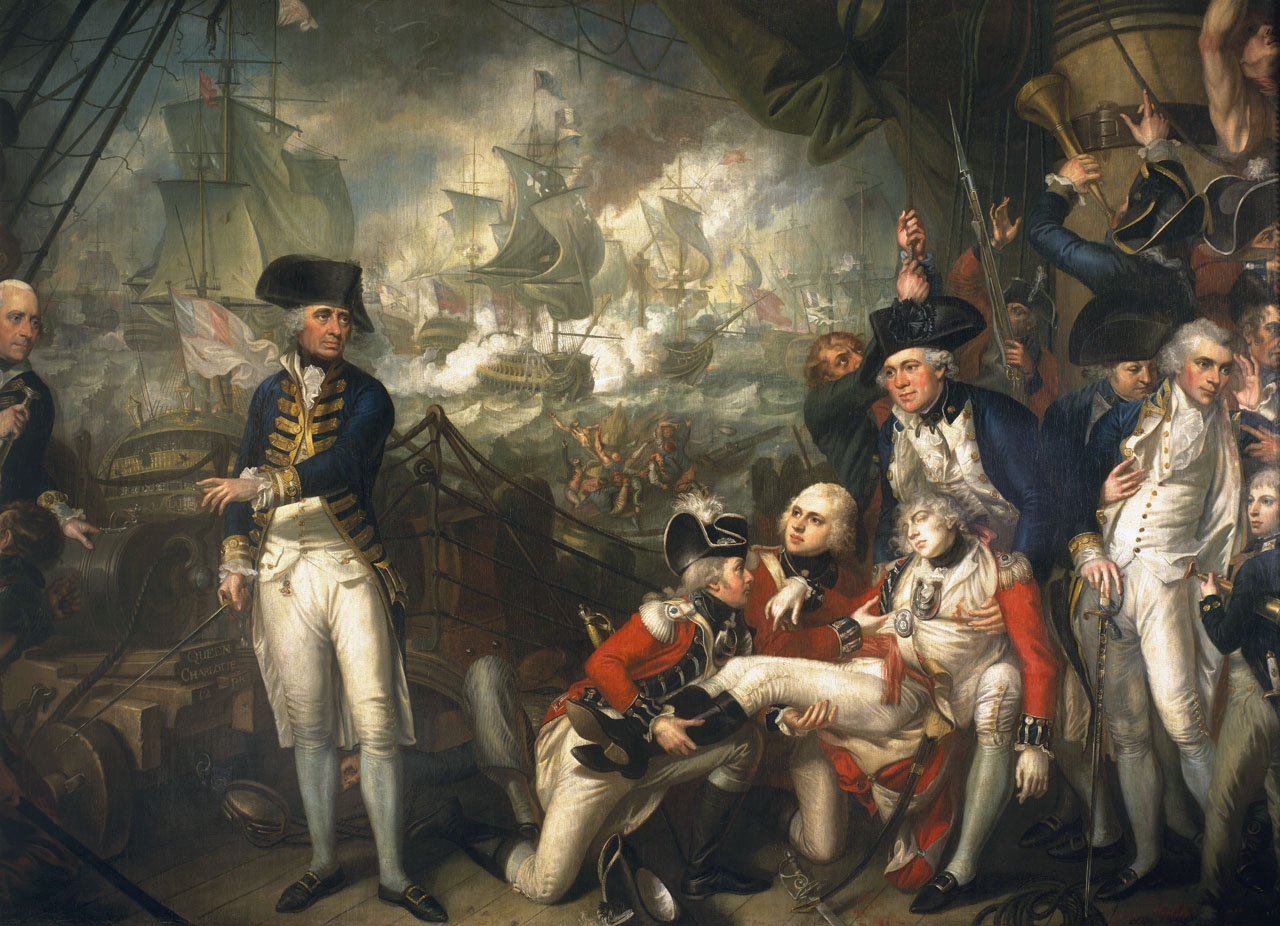
Lord Howe on the Deck of the Queen Charlotte by Mather Brown, 1794. Snape Douglas is standing on the far right

Douglas had married Anne Burgess on 14 November 1781 in British-occupied New York City. They had one son and two daughters: Anne Hammond Douglas, who married Sir George Bowyer, and Harriet Douglas. He had begun to suffer increasing ill health, complaining of persistent headaches, which eventually forced him to end his career at sea. He moved ashore but died on 4 June 1797. A subsequent autopsy revealed brain tumours, a likely result of his injury at the Glorious First of June three years before.

== Legacy ==
An engraving of Douglas is in the collection of the British National Portrait Gallery. There are several other images of Douglas; he appears in several paintings by Mather Brown and in a portrait by modern maritime artist Irwin Bevan. Douglas is primarily known today through his letters to his uncle.
