= HMS Princess (1795) =

Frigate of the Royal Navy

History

Dutch Republic
- Name: Willemstad en Boetselaar or Williamstadt en Boetzlaar
- Builder: Private shipyard in Dordrecht
- Captured: August 1795

Great Britain
- Name: HMS Princess
- Acquired: 1795 by capture
- In service: 1795
- Fate: Sold April 1816

General characteristics
- Tonnage: 978 (Dutch)
- Tons burthen: 67690/94 (bm)
- Length: Overall:140 ft 6 in (42.8 m); Keel:123 ft 0 in (37.5 m) (keel)
- Beam: 32 ft 2 in (9.8 m)
- Sail plan: Full-rigged ship
- Complement: 80 (as RN receiving ship)
- Armament: British frigate; Gundeck: 20 × 9-pounder guns; QD: 6 × 18-pounder carronades; Fc: 2 × 9-pounder guns + 2 × 18-pounder carronades; Receiving ship:18 × 6-pounder guns

HMS Princess was the Dutch East Indiaman Williamstadt en Boetzlaar (or Willemstad en Boetselaar) that the British Royal Navy captured on 18 August 1795 at the Capitulation of Saldanha Bay. The Royal Navy initially rated her a 28-gun sixth rate. She quickly became a receiving ship, a guard ship, and a floating battery. The Navy sold her in 1816.

== Dutch East India Company ==
The Amsterdam Chapter of the Dutch East India Company hired Williamstadt en Boetzlaar. She sailed from Texel on 22 December 1794, under the command of Captain Simon Koter (or Kooter), bound for Batavia. She arrived at the Cape of Good Hope (the Cape), on 10 May 1795.

She was one of five merchant vessels that the British Royal Navy captured at Simon's Bay on 18 August 1795.

== Royal Navy service ==
Princess was commissioned in November 1795 under Captain John Spanger. Captain Thomas Hardy replaced Spanger in January 1796, only to be replaced by Captain A. Todd (or Tod) in March. In March 1797 Captain N. Kemp replaced Todd. Captain Edward Ramage paid her off in August 1797.

Between 16 June 1797 and 29 November Princess was at Plymouth being fitted as a receiving ship. Lieutenant Richard Dorril commissioned her in August as a guardship for Waterford. In November her commander was lieutenant Cox, with Lieutenant Wills replacing him in October. Lieutenant Dorrill (or Dayrell) remained in command into 1798. In 1801 she served as a guard ship under the command of Lieutenant Joseph White.

In June 1802 Princess was at Plymouth in ordinary. Commander Samuel Colquitt recommissioned in June 1803 as a floating battery for Lymington and Liverpool. Commander Edward Killwick replaced Colquitt in July 1809. Then Commander James Galloway replaced Killwick in June 1810. (Note: This may have been a consequence of a courtmartial on 11 and 12 May 1810 which fully acquitted Lieutenant William Archbold of the "odium" that Killwick had thrown upon him while Archbold was serving on Princess.)

Captain Donald M'Leod took command in December 1812 and Commander William Simpson in May 1814. (Note: M'Leod commanded the impress service in Liverpool between June 1810 and peace with France in 1814.)

== Fate ==
The Navy sold Princess at Liverpool for £740 in April 1816.
