= Dutch sloop Sireene (1786) =

History

Dutch Republic
- Name: Sireene
- Builder: Naval yard at Harlingen, Friesland
- Launched: 1786
- Captured: 17 August 1796

Great Britain
- Name: HMS Daphne
- Acquired: 17 August 1796 by capture
- Renamed: HMS Laurel in 1798
- Fate: Sold 1821

General characteristics
- Type: Ship-sloop
- Tons burthen: 574 45/94 (bm)
- Length: Dutch: 126' (Amsterdam foot) (Note: All linear measurements are in Amsterdam feet (voet) of 11 Amsterdam inches (duim) (see Dutch units of measurement). The Amsterdam foot is about 8% shorter than an English foot. The basis of measurement is also different. The data is from van Maanen.); British:1,178 ft 10 1/2 in (359.3 m) (overall); 973 ft 1 in (296.6 m) (keel)
- Beam: Dutch: 34' 10/11"; British:33 ft 4 1/2 in (10.2 m)
- Depth of hold: Dutch: 13' 10/11"; British:11 ft 10 in (3.6 m)
- Propulsion: Sails
- Complement: Dutch service:150 British service:155
- Armament: Dutch service:20-26 guns; British service: Upper deck: 22 × 9-pounder guns; QD:2 × 6-pounder guns + 6 × 32-pounder carronades; Fc:2 × 32-pounder carronades

The Dutch sloop Sireene (or Sirène) was launched in 1786. The British captured her in 1796 at the capitulation of Saldanha Bay. She then served in the Royal Navy, first briefly as the sixth rate HMS Daphne, and then from 1798 as the prison ship HMS Laurel. The Admiralty sold her in 1821.

== Dutch service and capture ==
Sireene was a ship sloop with a quarterdeck, built at Haarlingen in 1786 for the Dutch admiralty under the 7th Charter.

At Saldanha Bay a squadron of the Batavian Navy, under the command of Rear-Admiral Engelbertus Lucas, surrendered without a fight to a Royal Navy squadron under the command of Vice-Admiral George Elphinstone at Saldanha Bay on 17 August 1796. Sireene was one of the vessels that the British captured. At the time of her capture, Sireene was armed with 18 guns, and had a crew of 130 men. She was under the command of Lieutenant Christiaan de Cerf.

== British service ==
The Royal Navy commissioned her in May 1797 under Commander James Brisbane for transit back to Britain. Sireene arrived at Portsmouth on 5 September 1797. The Admiralty renamed her HMS Daphne, and Commander Benjamin Page replaced Brisbane, but she was paid off in November.

In 1797 the Royal Navy re-captured Daphne from the French. The decision was taken to give her back her original name, and to rename the ex-Sireene HMS Laurel, HMS Laurel having been sold shortly before. In December 1797 Laurel was fitted at Portsmouth in 1798 for service as a convict ship.

== Fate ==
The Admiralty offered Laurel for sale in June 1821 at Portsmouth. She was sold on 6 July 1821 at Portsea for £610. Mr. Holmes, the buyer, broke her up.
