= Thomas Revell Shivers =

Royal Navy Vice-Admiral (1751–1827)

Thomas Revell Shivers (1751 – 1 June 1827) was a Royal Navy officer in the 18th/19th century who rose to be Vice Admiral.

== Life and career ==
Thomas Revell Shivers was born in Wickham, Hampshire in 1751. His early career in the Royal Navy is not clear. He appears in the Royal Navy in May 1777 (aged 26) as a Lieutenant in command of the schooner HMS Quebec at Newfoundland.

In August 1778, he replaced Lt Howell Lloyd in command of the 10-gun HMS Penguin. On 3 November, a storm in the Bay of Bulls off the Newfoundland coast wrecked Penguin. The armed brig Portillion was lost in the same storm. In January 1779 he was court martialled by Captain Nicholas Vincent on behalf of Admiral Robert Linzee regarding the loss of HMS Penguin. Following this he was placed on shore leave for 3 years.

On 24 January 1782, he came back into active service as commander of HMS Espion, a newly captured French ship of 16 guns. He sailed her to the Leeward Islands.

In May 1789, he was given command of the 18 gun HMS Orestes. On 21 September 1790 he was promoted to post captain and given command of the 32-gun HMS Emerald, a non-active post prior to her being paid off. He then had two years of shore leave before being given command of HMS Ariadne on 25 January 1793 serving in the Mediterranean. In January 1794 he was promoted to Commodore (flag captain) to Admiral Robert Linzee on HMS Alcide and returned to Britain in autumn with Admiral Phillips Cosby.

From 1794 to 1797, he had another long period of shore leave before taking command of the recently captured Dutch ship HMS Zealand in March 1797. In September Shrivers took command of HMS Standard. After a further year of shore leave he took his final active command on the 74-gun HMS Defence (1763 \6) in February 1799 plying the south English coast.

Shivers retired from active duty in December 1800. He was promoted several times thereafter ending at the rank of Vice Admiral.

Shivers died at Wickham on 1 June 1827, and was buried there in St Nicholas' Church on 8 June.

== Family ==
His wife Mary South died at Havelock House in Wickham in 1846.

He was uncle (through marriage) to James Buchanan Macaulay.
