= John Brisbane (Royal Navy officer) =

Royal Navy commander

Admiral John Brisbane (24 September 1735 – 10 December 1807) was a Royal Navy officer.

== Life and career ==
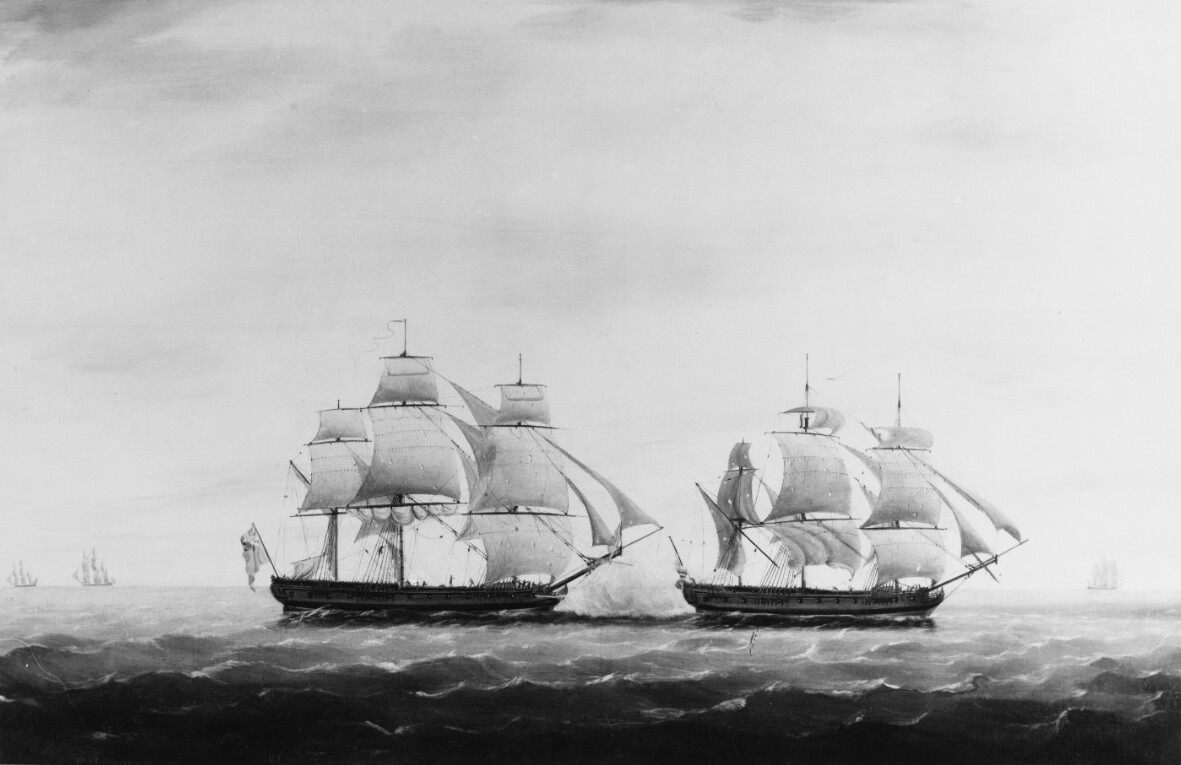
The British recapturing Fox

He was born in Largs, Renfrewshire on 24 September 1735 one of ten children of Thomas Brisbane (b.1688) and his wife, Isabel Nicholson.

On 5 August 1757 he was commissioned as a lieutenant in the Royal Navy. He was created Commander of the 12 gun sloop HMS Virgin at Barbados on 17 October 1760 as an in-field promotion. In March 1762 he was one of seven wounded in a landing party on St Lucia attempting to capture a schooner laden with coffee, but under fire from local fortifications.

He was promoted to Captain on 24 September 1761 and given command of the 28-gun HMS Lizard and her crew of 200 men in place of Captain James Doake. On 8 October on passage from Antigua to St Kitts he captured or sank five vessels out of a convoy of 17 en route from St Eustatius to Martinique. In January/February 1762 she was part of the attacks on Martinique.

On 7 February 1762 he was given command of the 22 gun HMS Nightingale in Martinique and returned her to Britain for repair at Woolwich Dockyard. On 20 August he was given command of HMS Echo but this was a nominal command only, with Echo at the end of her service. He then took extended shore leave until 1769 spending time with his wife and young family in Deal, Kent.

In October 1769 he was given command of HMS Cruizer which did simple patrol duties in the English Channel. In September 1770 he was given the larger HMS Cerberus, again nominal as Cerberus was undergoing repairs at Chatham. He then had another three years of shore leave before taking command of the 32-gun HMS Flora in December 1775 and again returned to action, sailing to North America to address the growing tensions there in April 1776. On 7 July 1777 with HMS Rainbow (under George Collier) they engaged the US ships Hancock and Boston, and their captive British vessel HMS Fox, famously captured both vessels, an action bringing him national fame in Britain.

In July 1779 he was given command of the newly launched HMS Alcide a state of the art 74 gun ship with a crew of 550 men. In January 1780 Alcide was part of the huge British attack on the Caracas convoy. He sailed her to New York in September 1780 and passed command to Captain Charles Thompson. He then obtained passage back to Britain.

On 12 June 1781 he was given command of HMS Hercules in Plymouth Dockyard - a final nominal post. He was then effectively retired but continued to be promoted due to his fame. He rose from Rear Admiral to Vice Admiral and finally full Admiral. He died in Southampton on 10 December 1807.

== Family ==
On 11 June 1759 he was married to Mary Young (b.1736). Their sons included

- Sir Charles Brisbane RN (1770-1829)
- John Douglas Brisbane RN (c.1750-1782) drowned
- William Henry Brisbane RN (c.1765-1794)
- Sir James Brisbane RN (1774-1826)
- Lt Col Thomas Stewart Brisbane (d.1795)
