= Charles Brisbane =

Royal Navy officer and politician (1770–1829)

Rear-Admiral Sir Charles Brisbane KCB
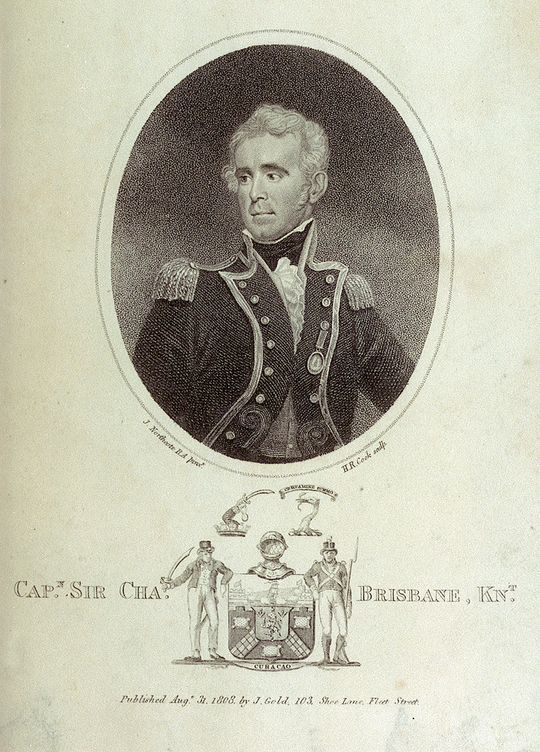
- Born: 1770
- Died: December 1829 (aged 58–59); Saint Vincent
- Relatives: James Brisbane (brother)
- Military career
- Allegiance: Great Britain; United Kingdom
- Branch: Royal Navy
- Service years: – 1829
- Rank: Rear-Admiral
- Commands: HMS Tarleton; HMS Oiseau; HMS Tremendous; HMS Crescent; HMS Doris; HMS Trent; HMS Goliath; HMS Arethusa; HMS Blake
- Conflicts: American Revolutionary War; Action of 8 January 1780; Great Siege of Gibraltar; Battle of the Saintes; French Revolutionary Wars; Siege of Toulon; Siege of Saint-Florent; Siege of Bastia; Napoleonic Wars; Capture of Curaçao; Action of 23 August 1806
- Awards: Knight Commander of the Bath

Rear-Admiral Sir Charles Brisbane, KCB (1770 – December 1829) was a Royal Navy officer and colonial administrator who served as the governor of Saint Vincent from 1808 to 1829. During the French Revolutionary and Napoleonic Wars, he took part in 1796 in the capitulation of Saldanha Bay, the capture of the Spanish frigate Pomona off Havana, Cuba in 1806, and then in 1807 was in command at capture of the island of Curaçao. He was made governor of St. Vincent in 1808, and served as such until his death in 1829.

== Family and early life ==
Charles Brisbane was born in mid-1770 and baptised on 12 July at Deal in Kent, the fourth but eldest surviving son of Captain (later Admiral) John Brisbane and his wife Mary Young. He was entered on board HMS Alcide, commanded by his father, in 1779. He was present at the action of 8 January 1780, and the relief of the Great Siege of Gibraltar in January 1780, and later served in the West Indies. At the end of 1781 he was placed on board HMS Hercules with Captain Henry Savage, and was present at the Battle of the Saintes off Dominica, on 12 April 1782, where he was badly wounded by a splinter.

He continued serving during the peace, and after the Spanish armament in 1790 was promoted to the rank of lieutenant on 22 November. In 1793 he was aboard the frigate HMS Meleager, in which he went out to the Mediterranean, and was employed on shore at Toulon during the occupation of the city, and afterwards in Corsica, both at the siege of Saint-Florent and at the siege of Bastia. Brisbane was under the immediate orders of Captain Horatio Nelson, and like him sustained the loss of an eye from a severe wound in the head inflicted by the small fragments of an iron shot. He then served for a short time in HMS Britannia, bearing the flag of Admiral Lord Hood, by whom he was promoted to the command of the sloop HMS Tarleton on 1 July 1794, and served in her during the remainder of that and the following year in the squadron acting in the Gulf of Genoa, under the immediate orders of Nelson.

== Command ==
In the autumn of 1795 he was sent from Gibraltar to convoy two troopships to Barbados. On his way there he fell in with a Dutch squadron, which he kept company with, sending the transports on by themselves; finding that the Dutch were bound for the Cape of Good Hope, he carried the intelligence to Sir George Elphinstone, the commander-in-chief on that station, acting contrary to the orders under which he had sailed. After the capture of the Dutch ships in Saldanha Bay on 18 August 1796, he was promoted by Sir George to the command of one of them; he had previously, 22 July, been promoted by Sir John Jervis, the commander-in-chief in the Mediterranean, under whose orders he had sailed, and he also received the thanks of the admiralty.

He continued on the Cape station in command of the frigate HMS Oiseau, and was in her at Saint Helena when a mutiny broke out on board. This he quelled decisively, and he was shortly afterwards recalled to the Cape to take command of HMS Tremendous, Rear-Admiral Thomas Pringle's flagship, on board which also there had been mutineers. In the course of 1798 he returned to England with Pringle in command of the frigate HMS Crescent, and in 1801 was appointed to the frigate HMS Doris, one of the squadron off Brest, under Admiral William Cornwallis.

== Napoleonic Wars ==
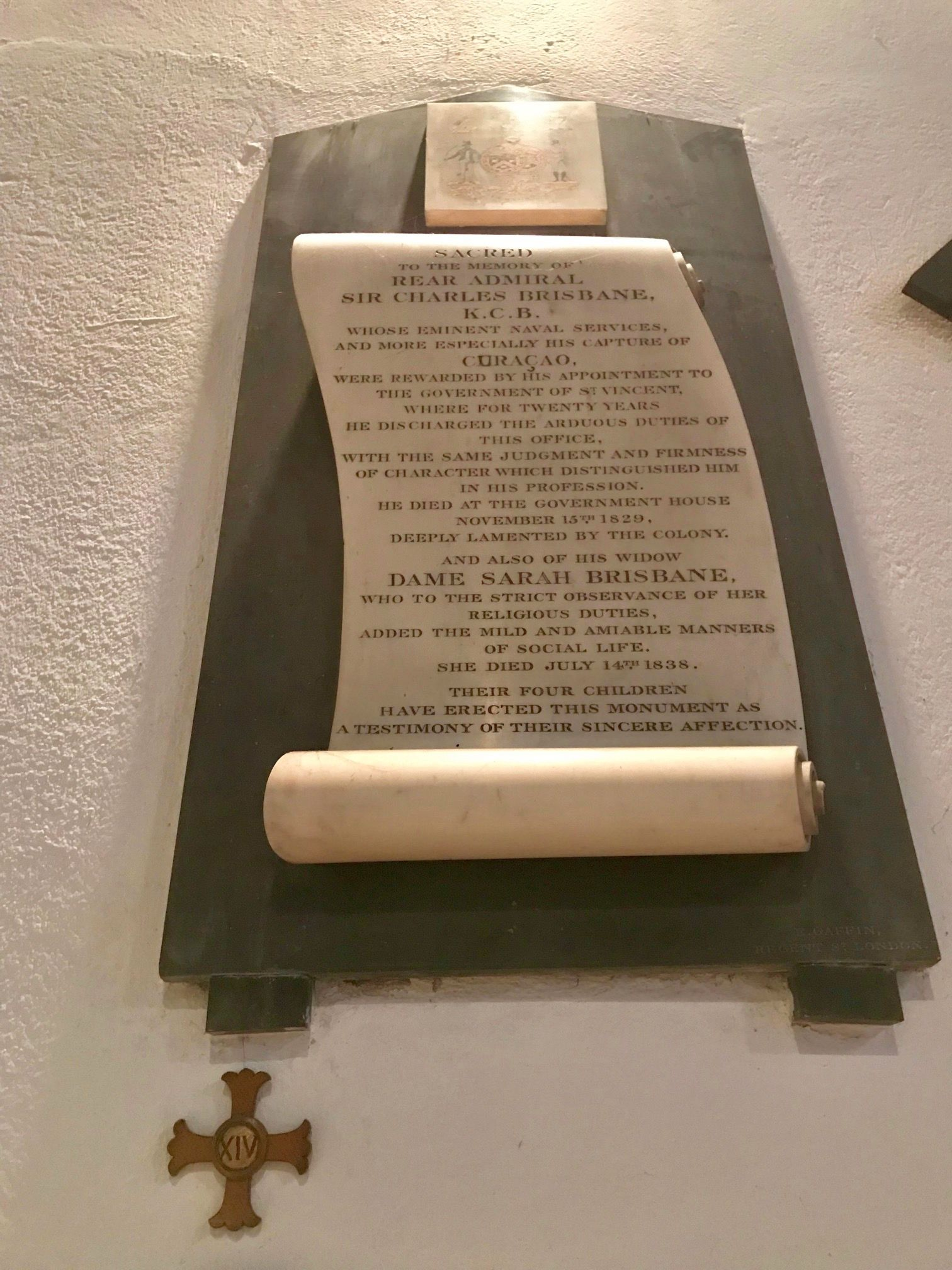
Memorial to Brisbane in the chancel of the Church of St Mary, Stanwell

During the short Peace of Amiens he commanded the frigate HMS Trent and HMS Sanspareil in the West Indies. He was then moved into HMS Goliath, on which he took part in the action of 28 June 1803, and in which on his way home he was nearly lost in a hurricane. In 1805 Brisbane was appointed to the frigate HMS Arethusa, which he took to the West Indies. Early in 1806 he ran Arethusa ashore amongst the Colorados rocks, near the north-west end of Cuba, and she was got off only by throwing all her guns overboard. In this defenceless condition she encountered a Spanish ship of the line off Havana, but the enemy vessel ran in under the guns of Morro Castle.

Having refitted at Jamaica, Arethusa was in August again off Havana, and on the 23rd, in company with the 44-gun HMS Anson, captured the Spanish frigate Pomona, anchored near a battery, and supported by ten gunboats. The gunboats were all destroyed and the battery blown up, apparently by some accident to the furnaces for heating shot. The heated shot had temporarily set Arethusa on fire, she had two men killed and thirty-two men, including Captain Brisbane, wounded.

On 1 January 1807 Brisbane, still in Arethusa, with three other frigates, having been sent off Curaçao, reduced the forts and captured the island from the Dutch. For his success on this occasion Brisbane was knighted, and he, as well as the other three captains, received a gold medal. He continued in command of Arethusa till near the end of 1808, when he was transferred to the 74-gun HMS Blake, but was almost immediately afterwards appointed governor of the island of Saint Vincent. He held the post, without any further service at sea, until his death on the island in December 1829. On 2 January 1815 he had been nominated a KCB, and attained his flag rank on 12 August 1819.

== Family ==
He married Sarah, daughter of Sir James Patey, of Reading, and left several children.

His daughter Lavinia married Lt General John Frederick Ewart and was mother to both General Sir John Alexander Ewart (1821–1904) and Charles Brisbane Ewart.

Preceded by George Beckwith	Governor of Saint Vincent; 1808–1829	Succeeded by William John Struth (acting)
