= James Brisbane =

British Royal Navy officer (1774–1826)

Captain Sir James Brisbane CB
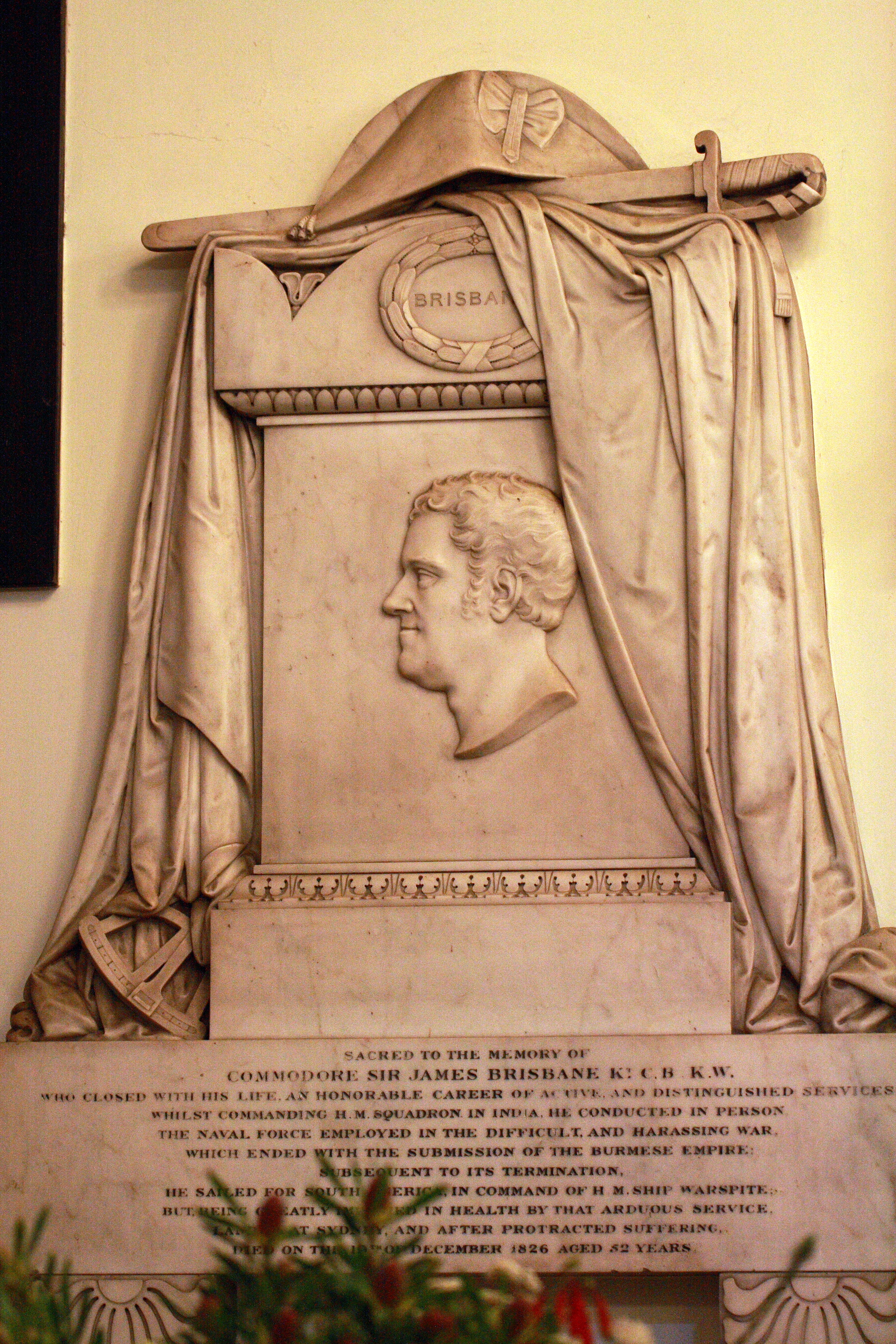
- Memorial to Sir James Brisbane in St James' Church, Sydney
- Born: 1774
- Died: 19 December 1826 (aged 51–52); Port Jackson, Sydney, New South Wales
- Relatives: Charles Brisbane (brother)
- Military career
- Allegiance: United Kingdom
- Branch: Royal Navy
- Service years: 1787–1826
- Rank: Captain
- Commands: HMS Daphne; HMS Cruizer; HMS Saturn; HMS Alcmene; HMS Belle Poule; HMS Vengeur; HMS Pembroke; East Indies Station
- Conflicts: French Revolutionary Wars; Glorious First of June; Napoleonic Wars; Adriatic campaign; Bombardment of Algiers; First Anglo–Burmese War
- Awards: Knight Bachelor; Companion of the Order of the Bath

Captain Sir James Brisbane, CB (1774 – 19 December 1826) was a British Royal Navy officer of the French Revolutionary and Napoleonic Wars. Although never engaged in any major actions, Brisbane served under both Lord Howe and Horatio Nelson and performed important work at the Cape of Good Hope, prior to the Battle of Copenhagen and in the Adriatic campaign of 1807–1814. In later life Brisbane became commander-in-chief in the East Indies. He contracted dysentery in Burma and arrived in Port Jackson in Sydney aboard HMS Warspite, where he died on 19 December 1826. He was a cousin of General Sir Thomas Brisbane who had earlier been governor of New South Wales.

== Career ==
James Brisbane was born in 1774, the fifth son of Admiral John Brisbane and the younger brother of future Admiral Charles Brisbane. In 1787, Brisbane went to sea aboard HMS Culloden and by 1794 he was signal midshipman aboard Lord Howe's flagship HMS Queen Charlotte. Brisbane served in this capacity at the Glorious First of June, where Queen Charlotte was heavily engaged and badly damaged. In the aftermath of the battle, Brisbane was promoted to lieutenant and was sent to the Cape of Good Hope, later joining George Elphinstone's flagship HMS Monarch and being present at the surrender of a Dutch squadron in Saldanha Bay.

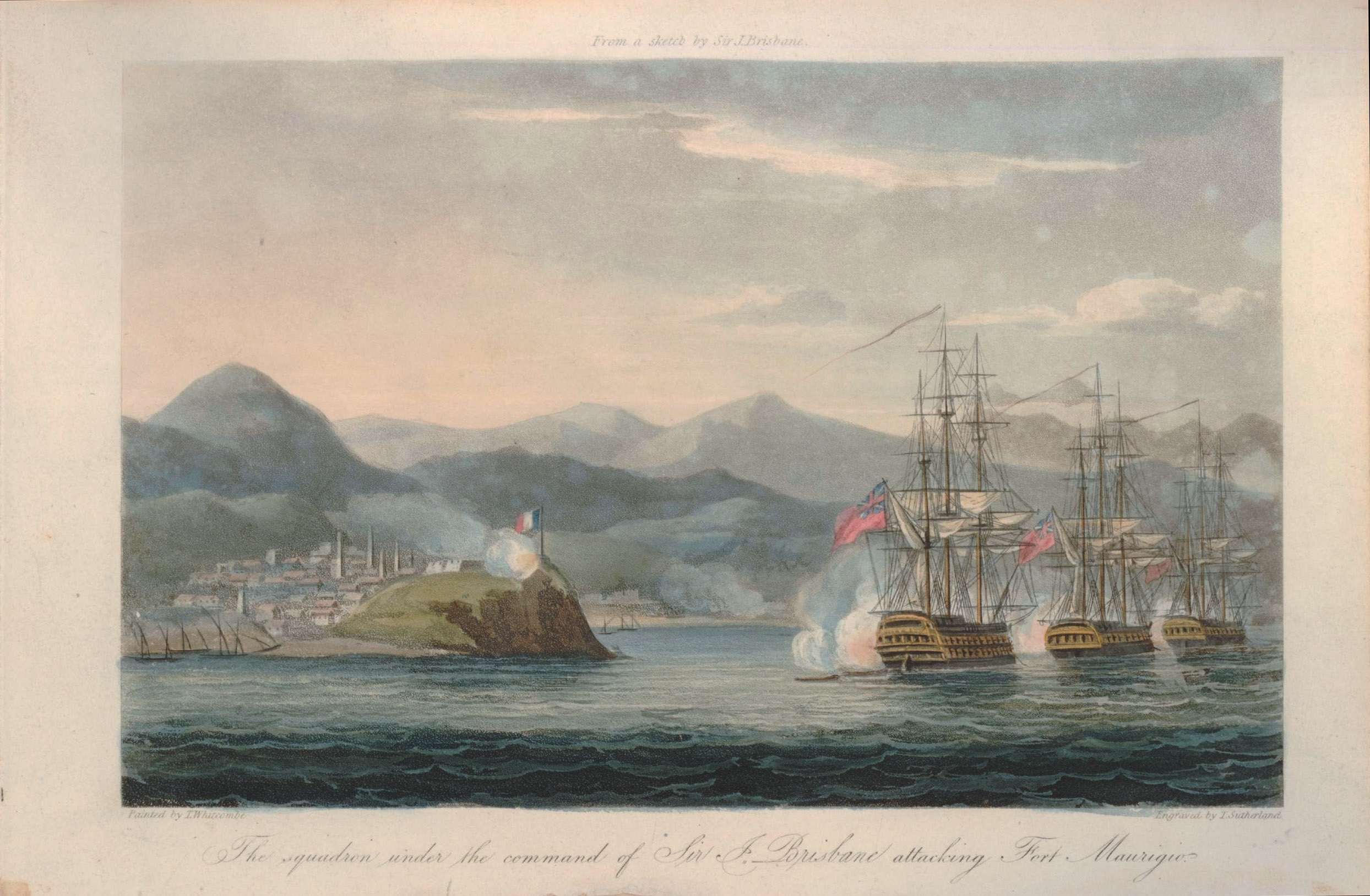
Squadron attacking Fort Maurigio in 1814, from a sketch by James Brisbane

Brisbane was promoted to commander and given command of one of the captured Dutch ships, the sloop Sireene, which the Royal Navy renamed Daphne. When she reached Plymouth in September 1797 the Navy paid off Daphne and Brisbane was put on half-pay. Brisbane remained on half-pay until 1800; he married Jemima Ann Ventham shortly before he returned to sea in command of HMS Cruizer. Cruizer was attached to Sir Hyde Parker's Baltic fleet on commissioning and Brisbane came under the direct command of Admiral Horatio Nelson, who used Cruizer to take soundings and make charts of the approaches to Copenhagen prior to the British attack on the city at the Battle of Copenhagen. Brisbane impressed his superiors in this duty and in 1801 was made a post-captain and commanded HMS Saturn under Admiral Thomas Totty until the admiral's death.

Between 1803 and 1805, Brisbane commanded the Kent sea fencibles and in 1807 took command of HMS Alcmene off Ireland. In 1809, he moved to HMS Belle Poule, and commanded her in the Adriatic Sea and Ionian Sea in the early stages of the Adriatic campaign of 1807–1814. There Brisbane captured the French frigate Var off Valona. He later participated in the capture of several of the Ionian Islands and remained in the region until 1811, becoming an expert in coastal operations.

In late 1811, Brisbane took command of Vengeur, and stayed with her for a year. He then transferred to the command of the newly built HMS Pembroke in the Channel Fleet. In 1813 he returned to the Mediterranean Sea, where he remained for the rest of the war.

A squadron under his command, composed of Pembroke in company with Alcmene and Aigle on 11 April 1814 captured Fortune, Notre Dame de Leusainte, and a settee of unknown name, at Fort Maurigio, in the Gulf of Genoa, near Monaco. The squadron silenced the fort's guns, and attacked 20 vessels; 4 were captured, and the cargoes of another 15 taken off ships whose crews scuttled them. (Note: A first-class share of the prize money was worth £95 4s 0d; a sixth-class share, that of an ordinary seaman, was worth 12s 7d.)

He was appointed a Companion of the Order of the Bath on 16 September 1815. In 1816, Pembroke was attached to the force under Lord Exmouth that bombarded Algiers and on his return home, as captain of HMS Queen Charlotte, Brisbane was knighted.

In 1825, Brisbane was made commander-in-chief of the East Indies Station and sailed there as commodore, arriving in 1826 and taking part in the latter stages of the First Anglo-Burmese War, in which he had some success in riverine operations. During the campaign however he contracted a fatal illness and died from it aboard HMS Warspite in Sydney in 1826.

Brisbane is remembered as a popular and capable commander whose expertise was focused on coastal and riverine operations, which he conducted with success throughout his career.

== Memorial ==
A memorial to Sir James Brisbane was erected in St James' Church, Sydney in 1830.

== Notes ==
Military offices
| Preceded by Charles Grant | Commander-in-Chief, East Indies Station; 1825–1826 | Succeeded by William Hall Gage |
