= Thomas Pringle (Royal Navy officer) =

Royal Navy officer (died 1803)

Vice-Admiral Thomas Pringle
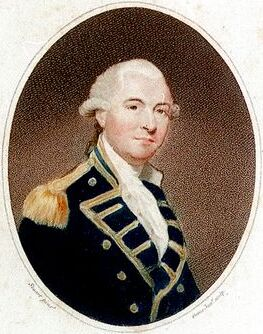
- Born: Scotland
- Died: 8 December 1803; Edinburgh, Scotland
- Military career
- Allegiance: Kingdom of Great Britain; United Kingdom
- Branch: Royal Navy
- Service years: – 1803
- Rank: Vice-Admiral
- Commands: HMS Ariadne; HMS Daedalus; HMS Royal George; HMS Valiant; Cape of Good Hope Station
- Conflicts: American Revolutionary War; Battle of Valcour Island; Battle of St. Lucia; Battle of Grenada; French Revolutionary Wars; Glorious First of June
- Awards: Naval Gold Medal

Vice-Admiral Thomas Pringle (died 8 December 1803) was a Royal Navy officer who served in the American War of Independence and the French Revolutionary and Napoleonic Wars.

== Early life ==
Thomas Pringle was born into a wealthy Scottish family, the only son of Walter Pringle, a wealthy man who owned slave plantations in the British West Indies. Pringle joined the Royal Navy, and was sent to the West Indies. In Barbados, he purchased Rachael Lauder, an enslaved mulatto woman, to save her from her sexually abusive father William Lauder. The pair had become lovers, and after purchasing her, Pringle manumitted Lauder and set her up in a house in Bridge Town. After settling Lauder in the house, Pringle left the island, returning to his military career; Lauder took his surname and later the surname Polgreen as well. He served in North America in 1775, as first lieutenant of HMS Lizard. Stationed at Quebec as American forces approached, Pringle was sent to Britain in November 1775 aboard the merchant vessel Polly, with despatches warning of the imminent American attack.

== Command ==
Pringle was briefly captain of the armed ship Lord Howe. He left her and in October 1776, he commanded the Royal Navy fleet on Lake Champlain in the Battle of Valcour Island, where he defeated a smaller American fleet under the command of Benedict Arnold. On his return to England in November 1776 he was promoted to post-captain. In January 1777, he was given command of HMS Ariadne, assigned to the West Indies station. He served well there, capturing a number of American naval vessels, transports, and privateers, including the Virginia State Navy brig Mosquito on 5 June 1777, and the privateer Johnston on 29 November 1777. His most notable prize was USS Alfred on 10 July 1778, captured in company with James Richard Dacres's HMS Ceres.

Pringle operated for the next two years with Admiral Samuel Barrington's fleet, seeing action at the Battle of St. Lucia on 14/15 December 1778, and at the Battle of Grenada on 6 July 1779. Pringle sailed home with Barrington and paid off Ariadne for a refit in early 1780. In July 1780 he was given command of HMS Daedalus, a 32-gun frigate, in which he served as part of the North American fleet for the next two years. He also operated in British waters, capturing the privateer Moustic in the English Channel on 20 January 1782.

=== The Nelson connection ===
In April 1782 he escorted a convoy from Cork to Quebec. Joining him for this task, and placed under his command, was Captain Horatio Nelson, in command of the frigate HMS Albemarle. Nelson was not looking forward to the tedious and difficult task of escorting a convoy through the Atlantic storms, nor did he rate Pringle highly, thinking that Pringle wanted to go to Canada only because of the money he could make shipping specie. In the event Nelson found the voyage to be not as bad as he had feared and also realised that he had misjudged Pringle, subsequently declaring that Pringle was 'my particular friend, and a man of great honour.' Nelson and Pringle's friendship was an enduring one. The day after Nelson's marriage to Frances Nisbet in 1787 Pringle wryly remarked that the navy had lost its 'greatest ornament', so expressing his concern that a wife got in the way of a successful naval career.

=== The Peace, and the French Revolutionary Wars ===
Pringle returned to Britain at the end of 1782, in time to capture another privateer in the Channel, this time the Légère on 11 December 1782. Daedalus was assigned to patrol the Shetland fisheries in 1783, before Pringle paid her off in July 1784. He is recorded to have recommissioned the hulked 74-gun third rate HMS Hero in October 1787 as a receiving ship at Chatham Dockyard, though had moved later that month to take command of the new 90-gun second rate HMS Impregnable.

In May 1790 he was put in command of HMS Royal George, a 100-gun first-rate that served briefly as Admiral Samuel Barrington's flagship. In 1791, Rachel died and left some of her slaves to Pringle in her will. In October 1793, Pringle was given command of the 74-gun HMS Valiant, joining Lord Howe's fleet. Pringle was therefore present at the Glorious First of June the following year, where his ship had two killed and nine wounded. He was awarded the Naval Gold Medal for his part in the action, and promoted to rear-admiral that year.

== Flag rank ==
In 1795 Pringle, by now a rear-admiral, raised his flag aboard the 74-gun HMS Asia and served in the North Sea. He later removed to HMS Tremendous, and sailed to South Africa to take command of the Cape of Good Hope Station in May 1796. He was in Saldanha Bay under Vice-Admiral George Elphinstone when a squadron of the Batavian Navy under Rear-Admiral Engelbertus Lucas was forced to surrender on 17 August 1796. His legacy as commander of the navy on the Cape station was commemorated in the naming of Pringle Bay.

In 1797, he had to put down a mutiny aboard his flagship which was anchored in the harbour. The seamen aboard the ship had threatened their captain, George Hopewell Stephens, with a court-martial composed of members of the crew on charges of cruelty and mistreatment. The mutinous spirit was temporarily quashed with a general pardon, while Stephens requested a regular court-martial to clear his name. While this was held aboard HMS Sceptre, Pringle sent a ship to recall the Tremendous's previous captain, Charles Brisbane. Stephens was honourably acquitted at the court-martial and returned to duty, but shortly afterwards the crew of the Tremendous broke out into open mutiny, this spreading to other ships in the harbour. Pringle, who was onshore at the time, ordered the batteries around the harbour to be manned, and aimed at the Tremendous, the source of the mutiny. With over 100 guns pointed at his flagship he demanded the crews return to obedience and give up the ringleaders within two hours, or he would order the Tremendous destroyed. Realising that Pringle was sincere in his intent, the mutineers surrendered 10 minutes before Pringle's deadline passed. The ringleaders were handed over and order was restored to the fleet.

On 14 February 1799, Pringle was promoted to Vice Admiral of the White, and on 1 January 1801, to Vice Admiral of the Red. He died in Edinburgh on 8 December 1803.

== Notes ==
Military offices
| Preceded by George Elphinstone | Commander-in-Chief, Cape of Good Hope Station; 1796–1798 | Succeeded by Hugh Cloberry Christian |
