= George Sayer (Royal Navy officer) =

Rear-Admiral George Sayer CB
- Born: 1773; Deal, Kent
- Died: 29 April 1831; Craven Street, London
- Military career
- Allegiance: United Kingdom
- Branch: Royal Navy
- Rank: Rear-Admiral
- Commands: HMS Lacedemonian; HMS Albacore; HMS Xenophon; HMS Inspector; HMS Proselyte; HMS Galatea; HMS Leda; East Indies Station
- Conflicts: French Revolutionary Wars; Napoleonic Wars
- Awards: Companion of the Order of the Bath

Rear-Admiral George Sayer CB (1773 – 29 April 1831) was a Royal Navy officer who twice became Commander-in-Chief of the East Indies Station.

== Naval career ==
Sayer joined the Royal Navy at an early age and first saw action in HMS Phoenix in the campaign against Tipu Sultan on the Malabar Coast. Promoted to lieutenant in July 1793, he was serving in HMS Carysfort during the Frigate action of 29 May 1794 when the Carysfort recaptured the French ship Castor.

His first command was the sloop HMS Lacedemonian in 1796. He later commanded HMS Albacore, HMS Xenophon, and HMS Inspector. In Inspector, Sayer conveyed the Prince of Orange from England to the Continent. Sayer received promotion to post captain on 14 February 1801, but was appointed to his next command, HMS Proselyte, only in late 1804.

He was given command of HMS Galatea in July 1805 and on 11 September 1805 shared with Circe, Africaine, Hippomenes, Amelia, and the schooner Maria in the proceeds of the capture of the brig Hiram. On 18 August 1806 Galatea's barge, under Lieutenant M'Culloch, captured a schooner several miles up a river near Puerto Cabello, Venezuela. Three days later Galatea's boats, under Lieutenant Walker, captured a small Spanish privateer armed with swivel guns and small arms. Her crew, however, escaped; Walker had her destroyed.

Galatea's boats captured the French corvette Lynx off Les Saintes on 21 January 1807. The boats, manned with five officers, 50 seamen and 20 marines, had to row for eight hours, mainly in the blazing sun, to catch her. During the action Lieutenant William Coombe, who had already lost a leg in a previous action, received a musket ball through the thigh above the previous amputation. The British only succeeded in boarding Lynx on their third attempt and a desperate struggle occurred on deck as the crew of the Lynx outnumbered their attackers. The British lost nine men killed and 22 wounded, including Coombe. The French had 14 killed and 20 wounded, including the captain.

Sayer was also present at the capture of the Danish West Indies in December 1807. He returned to Britain in Galatea in 1809.

He commissioned HMS Leda in November 1809 and sailed for the East Indies on 9 June 1810. In doing so, he escorted some East Indiamen to Bengal, one of them being Earl Spencer.

In August 1811 Sayer took part in the Invasion of Java under Sir Robert Stopford. In June 1813 he led a punitive expedition to Borneo to subdue the Sultanate of Sambas.

Following the death of Sir Samuel Hood in December 1814 Sayer became Commander-in-Chief of the East Indies Station. In June 1815 Sayer was succeeded by Sir George Burlton but in November 1815 Burlton died at Madras and Sayer again became Commander-in-Chief, remaining in that post until November 1816 when Sir Richard King arrived.

Sayer was appointed CB and became a Rear Admiral of the Blue in July 1830. He died, unmarried, at his home in Craven Street in London.

== Footnotes ==
Military offices
Preceded by Samuel Hood	Commander-in-Chief, East Indies Station; 1814	Succeeded by George Burlton
Preceded by George Burlton	Commander-in-Chief, East Indies Station; 1815–1816	Succeeded by Sir Richard King
