= Castor (1786 ship) =

History

Dutch Republic
- Name: Castor
- Namesake: Castor (ship)
- Builder: Rotterdam
- Laid down: 1781
- Launched: 1786
- Captured: 17 August 1796

Great Britain
- Name: HMS Saldanha
- Acquired: 17 August 1796 by capture
- Fate: Sold 1806

General characteristics
- Type: Frigate, 40-gun (Fifth Charter; Dutch), or 44-gun (fifth rate; English)
- Tons burthen: 10654/94 (bm)
- Length: Overall: 147 ft 3 in (44.9 m); Keel: 1,238 ft 1 in (377.4 m)
- Beam: 40 ft 42 in (13.3 m)
- Depth of hold: 12 ft 4 in (3.8 m)
- Propulsion: Sails
- Complement: 294
- Armament: Upper deck (UD): 26 × 18-pounder guns; QD: 10 × 9-pounder guns; Fc: 4 × 9-pounder guns

Castor was built at Delfshaven and launched in 1786. The British captured her at the capitulation of Saldanha Bay in August 1796. Because there was already an HMS Castor, they renamed her HMS Saldanha. After she arrived at Plymouth the Royal Navy fitted her as a receiving ship in November 1797; she was sold in 1806.

== Career ==
In 1796 the Batavian Republic decided to make an attempt to reconquer the Cape. To that end it sent nine ships of the Batavian Navy (including Castor, under Captain Claris), with 2,000 sailors and soldiers under the command of (temporary) Rear-Admiral Engelbertus Lucas in February 1796. This expedition arrived at Saldanha Bay on 6 August 1796, though Castor may have arrived a few days earlier. On 17 August the British captured the Dutch expeditionary force at Saldanha Bay in a bloodless "battle". Most of the sailors and soldiers in the Dutch force were Germans and nearly all entered British service, either with the Royal Navy or the East India Company. Admiral Lucas and the Dutch officers returned to Europe in the cartel Gertruida.

The Royal Navy commissioned Saldanha under Captain George Burlton in November. (He and three other post captains had sailed as passengers on HMS Trusty to Cape Town late in the year to take command of captured ships.) In April 1797 Burlton then sailed Saldanha back to Britain escorting a convoy.

In November she was fitted at Plymouth as a receiving ship. She was formally named and registered on 22 November 1797.

== Fate ==
By May 1805, Saldanha was in ordinary. The Admiralty offered Saldahna for sale at Hamoaze in December 1805; she was sold the following year.
