= HMS Camel (1776) =

History

Great Britain
- Name: Yorkshire
- Builder: Whitby
- Launched: 1776
- Fate: Sold 1776

Great Britain
- Name: HMS Camel
- Acquired: 1776 by purchase
- Commissioned: November 1776
- Out of service: Paid off in July 1784
- Fate: Sold 1784

General characteristics
- Tons burthen: 51646/94, or 600 (bm)
- Length: Overall:113 ft 0 in (34.4 m); Keel:96 ft 11 1/2 in (29.6 m)
- Beam: 31 ft 7 3/4 in (9.6 m)
- Depth of hold: 13 ft 3 1/2 in (4.1 m)
- Complement: Fifth rate:160; Armed transport:52
- Armament: 1776: Upper deck (UD):20 × 9–pounder guns; QD:4 × 3-pounder guns; 10 × ½–pounder swivel guns; 1780: **Upper deck (UD):22 × 9–pounder guns; QD:4 × 6-pounder guns; 1782:14 × 6-pounder guns

HMS Camel was the mercantile Yorkshire, which the Royal Navy purchased for use as a sixth-rate frigate. She captured a few merchant vessels in the West Indies, but spent most of her service escorting convoys across the Atlantic. She was converted to an armed transport in 1782–83. The Navy sold her in 1784.

== Merchantman ==
Yorkshire appeared in Lloyd's Register for 1777 with T.Hammond, master and owner, and trade Whitby transport. She had been launched at Whitby in 1776.

== Royal Navy ==
The Navy purchased Yorkshire in 1776, renamed her Camel, and had her undergo fitting at Deptford. Commander William Finch commissioned her in November. Finch received promotion to post captain in March 1777 and on 27 March sailed her to the Leeward Islands. She arrived at New York on 28 May with the bulk of her convoy.

On 7 September the USS Raleigh intercepted a British convoy and engaged HMS Druid. In the ensuing battle she damaged Druid, but the approach of the other British escorts, Camel and Weazel forced Raleigh to retire.

In December 1777 Captain Richard Bligh replaced Finch. Bligh sailed Camel to Jamaica on 27 January 1778.

Prior to 24 July 1778 Camel sent into Jamaica a homeward-bound French snow carrying coffee and indigo.

Then on 30 September Camel captured the snow Soigneux of the west end of Hispaniola. Soigneux, Elie Dumas, master, and Pierre Menorie of Bourdeaux, owner, was of 400 tons (bm), two guns, and 27 men. She was carrying sugar, coffee, etc. from St Louis, Hispaniola, to Port-au-Prince and Bourdeaux.

On April 2, 1779 Camel captured Hirondelle, Mathew Lupagerie, master, and Manneau of Port-au-Prince, owner, off Cape Antonio in Cuba. She was of 150 tons (bm), had a crew of 16 men, and was armed with four guns. She was carrying a cargo of sugar, coffee, taffia, melasses, and salt from Port-au-Prince to Baltimore.

In January 1780 Captain John Pakenham replaced Bligh with Camel operating in home waters.

Camel was paid off in July 1782. She then underwent fitting at Woolwich until January 1783 for service as an armed transport. Lieutenant George Burleton took command in November 1782 and recommissioned Camel in April 1783 as an armed transport. He sailed her for North America on 24 May 1783.

== Fate ==
Camel was paid off in July 1784. She was sold at Deptford on 27 August 1784 for £1,500 in a private sale.
