= HMS Alcide (1779) =

Ship of the line of the Royal Navy

- The Battle of Saint Kitts, which Alcide took part in

History

Great Britain
- Name: HMS Alcide
- Ordered: 31 August 1774
- Builder: Deptford Dockyard
- Laid down: 4 June 1776
- Launched: 30 July 1779
- Fate: Broken up, 1817
- Notes: Participated in: Battle of Cape St Vincent; Battle of Martinique; Battle of St. Kitts; Battle of the Saintes

General characteristics
- Class & type: Albion-class ship of the line
- Tons burthen: 1625
- Length: 168 ft (51 m) (gundeck)
- Depth of hold: 18 ft 10 in (5.74 m)
- Propulsion: Sails
- Sail plan: Full-rigged ship
- Armament: Gundeck: 28 × 32-pounder guns; Upper gundeck: 28 × 18-pounder guns; QD: 14 × 9-pounder guns; Forecastle: 4 × 9-pounder guns

HMS Alcide, the French and Italian version of "Alcides", another name for Heracles, was a 74-gun third-rate ship of the line of the Royal Navy, designed by Sir Thomas Slade and built by Adam Hayes at Deptford Dockyard being launched on 30 July 1779.

== Service history ==
On launch she was under command of Captain John Brisbane. She had a huge crew of 550 men. Under Brisbane she was part of the major British attack on the Caracas convoy in January 1780.

She fought at the battles of Cape St Vincent and Martinique in 1780, and the battles of St. Kitts and the Saintes in 1782.

On 12 September 1780 Alcide captured the letter of marque Pocahontas. The Royal Navy took her into service as HMS Pocahontas.

In January 1782 she took part in the Battle of St Kitts (a.k.a. the Battle of Frigate Bay).

On 12 April 1782 Alcide was third in line of attack against the French fleet at the Battle of the Saintes, under the command of Captain Charles Thomson.

Alcide took part in operations against Corsica in September 1793, where she served as flagship to Commodore Robert Linzee.

== Notable commanders ==
- Captain John Brisbane 1779/80
- Captain Benjamin Caldwell 1787/8
- Sir Andrew Snape Douglas 1790 to 1792
- Captain Robert Linzee 1792/3 (raised to Rear Admiral)
- Captain John Woodley 1793/4
- Captain Thomas Revell Shivers briefly in 1794
- Sir Thomas Byard briefly in 1794
- Vice Admiral Phillips Cosby 1794

== Notable crew ==
- Lord Robert Manners - 2nd lieutenant 1779/80
- Thomas Revell Shivers - flag captain (commodore) 1794

== Fate ==
She was paid off in Portsmouth in 1794 and a survey had found her uneconomic to repair.

She was used as a receiving ship in Portsmouth Dock from 1802 until 1817, having had all guns removed.

Alcide was broken up at Portsmouth in April 1817.
