= Capitulation of Saldanha Bay =

1796 battle of the War of the First Coalition

- Part of the East Indies theatre of the French Revolutionary Wars
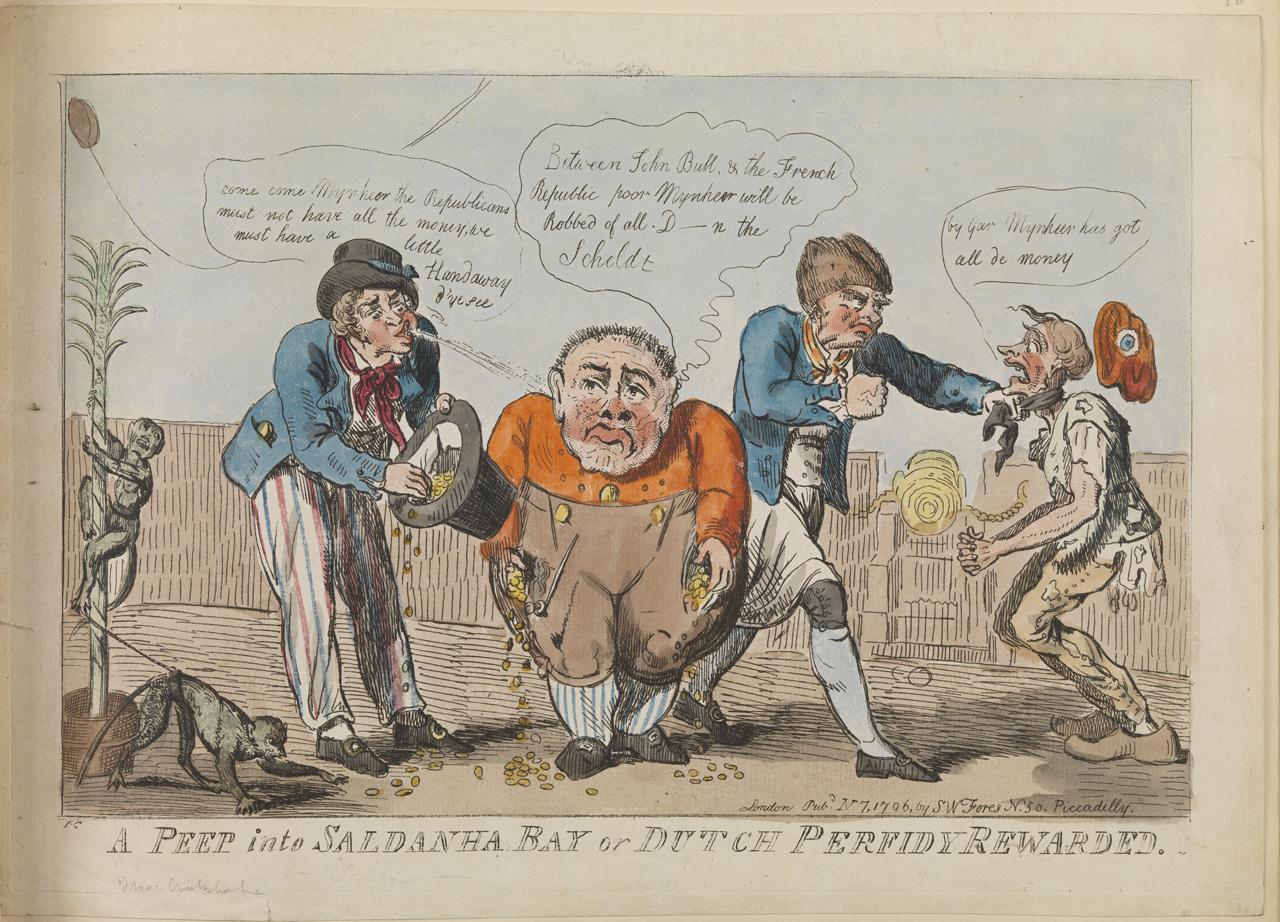
- 1796 cartoon mocking the Batavian capitulation
Date	17 August 1796
Location	Saldanha Bay, Dutch Cape Colony
Result	British victory

Belligerents
Great Britain	Batavian Republic

Commanders and leaders
George Elphinstone	Engelbertus Lucas Sr. (surrendered)

Strength
8 ships of the line; 1 frigate; 5 sloops	3 ships of the line; 2 frigates; 3 sloops; 1 merchant ship

Casualties and losses
None	1,972 captured; 3 ships of the line captured; 2 frigates captured; 3 sloops captured; 1 merchant ship captured

The capitulation of Saldanha Bay was the surrender to the British of a Batavian expeditionary force sent to recapture the Dutch Cape Colony in 1796 as part of the East Indies theatre of the French Revolutionary Wars. During the Flanders campaign of the War of the First Coalition, French troops overran the Dutch Republic in December 1794, leading to the latter becoming a French client state known as the Batavian Republic. Britain, concerned by the threat that the Cape Colony now posed to British trade with the East Indies, sent an invasion force under Vice-Admiral of the Blue Sir George Elphinstone that landed at Simon's Town in June 1795 and forced the colony's surrender in a short campaign. Elphinstone subsequently reinforced the British occupational garrison and stationed a squadron at the colony.

Though not yet aware of the fall of the Cape Colony, the Batavian government, worried by rumours of British attacks against the Dutch East India Company's colonies, decided to send a Batavian Navy squadron to the Dutch East Indies via the Cape in November 1795. The squadron, which was ordered to recapture the Cape Colony if necessary, comprised three ships of the line and six smaller vessels under Schout-bij-nacht Engelbertus Lucas Sr. Security regarding the operation was weak and before Lucas set sail the British government became aware of it and warned Elphinstone, who further reinforced the Cape. Lucas' journey took nearly six months, during which his squadron ran low on drinking water, leading to a near-mutinous state among his crews. On its arrival at the Cape Colony, the Batavian squadron anchored in Saldanha Bay to take on fresh water before deciding to abandon the operation and sail to the French colony of Isle de France in the Indian Ocean.

On 15 August 1796 a larger British fleet under Elphinstone discovered Lucas' squadron and trapped it in the bay. Aware that resistance would be futile and with his crews in open revolt, Lucas surrendered unconditionally on 17 August. The Batavian ships were commissioned into the Royal Navy, joining the squadron at the Cape Colony; Elphinstone was subsequently made Baron Keith in recognition of his achievement. Lucas' operation did however postpone an ultimately cancelled British invasion of Isle de France. Lucas faced a court-martial on his return to Holland, but died on 21 June 1797 before it began. The main responsibility for the surrender was laid at his feet but Lucas' death forestalled a conviction for dereliction of duty, and the other Batavian officers were all acquitted. The Cape Colony was not attacked again before the end of the French Revolutionary Wars in 1802, when the Treaty of Amiens returned it to the Batavian Republic.

== Background ==
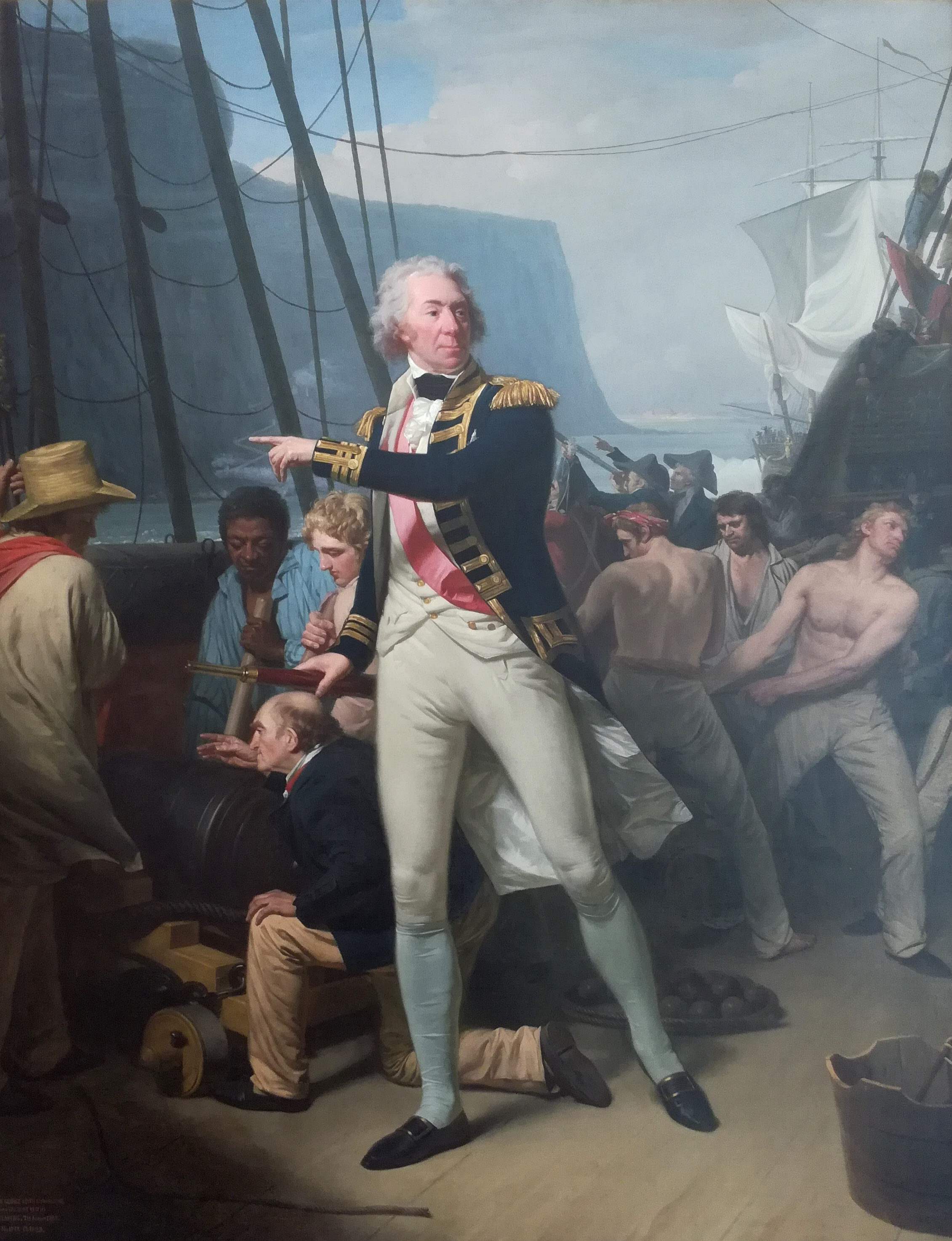
Painting of Sir George Elphinstone during the invasion of the Cape Colony

In 1795, the armies of the French Republic overran the Dutch Republic. Dutch opponents of stadtholder William V, Prince of Orange, referred to as Patriots (as opposed to the supporters of the stadtholder, who were known as Orangists), many of whom had returned with the French army from exile in France, proclaimed the Batavian Republic after the Batavian Revolution in January 1795. This event alarmed the government of Great Britain, erstwhile allies of the Dutch Republic in the War of the First Coalition, as the Dutch colonial empire included a number of strategically important colonies in the East Indies. The key to controlling European access to the region was the Dutch Cape Colony on the tip of Southern Africa; a naval force based there could dominate trade routes between Europe and the East Indies, in particular the economically vital links between Britain and British India.

To ensure that the Cape Colony did not become a French naval base, Secretary of State for War Henry Dundas ordered a large expeditionary force to sail for the colony in March 1795. The force comprised two squadrons and 500 troops, all under the overall control of Vice-Admiral Sir George Elphinstone; more substantial reinforcements followed. Arriving on 10 June in False Bay, Elphinstone then conducted two months of fruitless negotiations with Governor Abraham Josias Sluysken. On 7 August, with negotiations stalled, Elphinstone ordered an attack on Dutch positions at Muizenberg. The Dutch defenders withdrew, but Elphinstone's forces were low on food and ammunition and not numerous enough to launch a major attack on Cape Town. On 14 September the arrival of British reinforcements under General Alured Clarke convinced Sluysken to surrender the colony.

Elphinstone turned his attention to planning operations against the Dutch East Indies and the French Indian Ocean colony of Isle de France. He sailed for Madras in his flagship HMS Monarch to take command of the East Indies Station, but maintained a strong garrison and naval presence at the Cape Colony under Sir James Henry Craig and Commodore John Blankett. Much of his squadron subsequently dispersed on operations across the Indian Ocean. While Elphinstone was consolidating his position, the Batavian government determined in November 1795 to send an expedition to inspect its new colonies in the Dutch East Indies, as the previous owner, the Dutch East India Company, was about to be nationalised. The expedition was to call at the Cape Colony on its way; if that colony had been captured, an attempt at recapture could be made, but only if this was feasible. The expedition did not carry a large number of troops or boats to land them. If the colony was in enemy hands the expedition was to bypass the Cape Colony and sail directly for Isle de France.

A squadron was prepared under the command of Schout-bij-nacht Engelbertus Lucas Sr., who had sailed to the East Indies once in 1786, but otherwise had no experience of long expeditionary campaigns. His force comprised three 66-gun ships of the line, Dordrecht, Tromp and Revolutie along with six smaller warships. After calling at the Cape Colony, Lucas was to continue his expedition in order to reinforce the Dutch East Indies.

== Lucas' voyage ==
Lucas' expeditionary force sailed from the Texel on 23 February 1796, together with another squadron destined for the Dutch West Indies, under Vice-admiral Adriaan Braak, intending to pass through the North Sea and around Scotland before entering the Atlantic Ocean and turning south. Unspecified French support for the operation had been promised by the National Convention, but did not materialise. The British North Sea Fleet was actively blockading the Texel and the 16-gun brig HMS Espiegle sighted the Batavian force putting to sea. Espiegle shadowed Lucas throughout the day, sending a message to Admiral Adam Duncan at Great Yarmouth. On 26 February a small British squadron led by Captain Henry Trollope in HMS Glatton detached from the cruising division of Rear-admiral Thomas Pringle and encountered the Batavians, the weaker British making off as Lucas formed a line of battle.

Having successfully evaded pursuit, Lucas followed his planned route, arriving at Las Palmas on Gran Canaria on 13 April. The journey had not been unobserved: a small British warship, the 20-gun HMS Mozelle under Captain Charles Brisbane, had sighted the Batavian force near Madeira while Mozelle was escorting two merchant ships to Barbados. Leaving the merchant ships to make their way unescorted, Mozelle followed Lucas for several days and then sailed south with all haste to bring a warning to the Cape Colony. Despite noticing Mozelle, Lucas decided not to attack her.

After spending no less than 34 days taking on water and supplies at Las Palmas, Lucas on 26 May sailed to Praia on Cape Verde, before continuing south on 29 May in the direction of the Brazilian coast, hoping to profit from favourable trade winds and currents. In fact, due to persistent calms in the doldrums, the squadron only reached a position off the Brazilian shore on 27 June. The delay led Lucas to decide not to take in more water but to sail directly to the Cape Colony. The Batavian expeditionary force did not encounter another vessel during this time and thus had no information regarding British dispositions when it eventually reached the South-African coast on 26 July. After a council of war aboard Dordrecht, Lucas decided not to reconnoitre Table Bay and on 6 August the squadron anchored in Saldanha Bay.

British agents had observed Lucas' preparations in Holland and reported them in January, more than a month before the expedition sailed. The British Admiralty sent the frigate HMS Carysfort to the Cape Colony with a warning. Carysfort arrived at the colony in April, but vague accounts of Lucas' mission had reached Elphinstone even earlier, appearing at Madras in March, less than a month after Lucas' departure from the Texel. Sailing from Madras on 23 March, Elphinstone reached the Cape Colony on 23 May where he received detailed reports of the size and status of the Batavian force heading for the colony. The Admiralty had already responded to the threat by diverting substantial resources to the Cape Colony: in addition to Elphinstone and Blankett's forces a convoy of transports led by Captain William Essington arrived on 28 May and a small squadron under Pringle followed on 28 July, joined that day by Mozelle with the most detailed reports to date of Lucas' movements. Subsequent reinforcements arrived from the squadron based in India, so that by August there were seven ships of the line and seven smaller vessels under Elphinstone's command and the garrison of the colony stood at 9,400 troops.

== Saldanha Bay ==
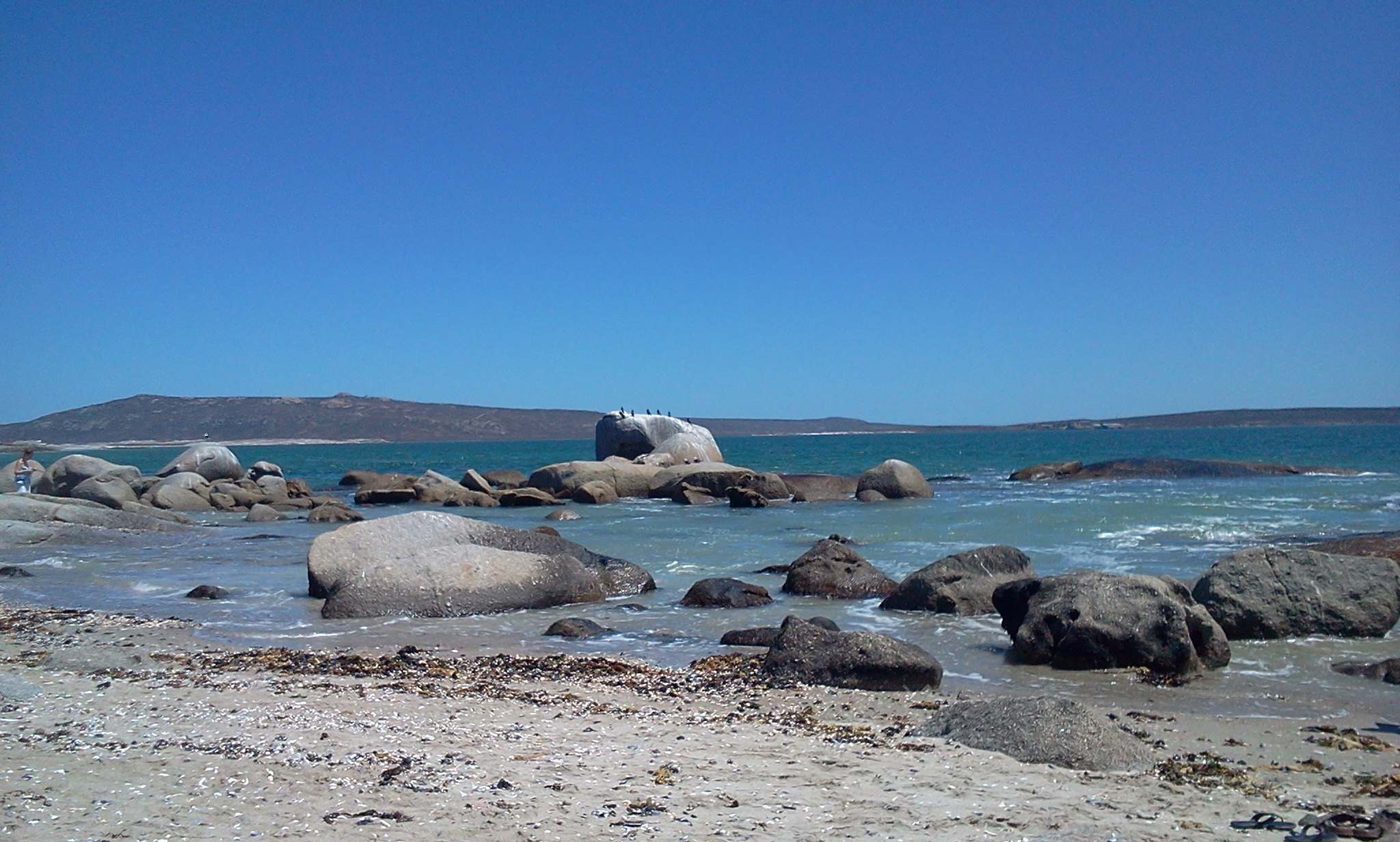
Saldanha Bay (pictured in 2012), the site of Lucas' surrender

Elphinstone was concerned that the Batavian force might not be sailing for the Cape Colony at all. In May, a French frigate squadron under Counter-admiral Pierre César Charles de Sercey had sailed past the colony without stopping, observed by HMS Sphynx, which it chased back to Simon's Town. If the Batavian force was sailing for the East Indies, it might bypass the Cape Colony altogether. Elphinstone therefore decided to take his fleet out to sea to search for the Batavians. On 6 August Elphinstone sailed southwest from False Bay in search of Lucas, but a fierce storm caught the British, inflicting damage on the ships, including the loss of the mainmast on Monarch and flooding on HMS Ruby. The fleet returned to Simon's Bay in a battered state on 12 August, to learn on arrival that Lucas' force lay at anchor to the north. The following day a storm swept the bay. Most of Elphinstone's ships were damaged: both HMS Crescent and HMS Trident grounded, and HMS Tremendous dragged anchors and was almost wrecked.

Lucas had arrived off the colony on 26 July with no knowledge of Elphinstone's dispositions. He had more pressing concerns: it had been several months since his ships had sighted land and his supplies of drinking water were running dangerously low. A significant proportion of his crews were suffering from scurvy and he had decided to send these men to an encampment ashore to facilitate their recovery. Lucas even ordered that the sails on his ships be removed for repairs, rendering his ships temporarily immobile. On 9 August, Lucas was warned by a servant of a Dutch colonist that a superior British force was present and that the settler population would not assist an attack on the British; he was strongly advised to sail away. Lucas, on hearing this, instead sailed deeper into the bay. Craig sent cavalry to Saldanha Bay to harry Batavian shore parties and organised the withdrawal of the local population and livestock to prevent their capture. He followed with a larger force under his own command. Lucas held a council of war with his senior officers, debating whether an attack on Cape Town was practical or whether they should abandon the operation. By 16 August the decision had been made to sail for Isle de France, but Lucas delayed, unwilling to leave his sick men ashore.

As the Batavian force prepared to sail, on 16 August Elphinstone's fleet appeared off the bay, led by the scouting frigate Crescent. He sent a letter to Lucas demanding that Lucas surrender, which demand Lucas refused. Ascertaining the strength of the Batavian force, in the evening of 16 August Elphinstone led his fleet into the bay in line of battle and brought the line to anchor at close gunshot range to Lucas' ships. Trapped between the coast and the British, Lucas immediately raised a flag of truce. He then sent an officer to negotiate terms with Elphinstone. Elphinstone granted a delay to enable Lucas to consult his captains, but demanded assurances that the Batavian ships would not be damaged. Lucas gave his word of honor that this would not be done. The council of war then decided that a capitulation on terms should be sought. One of the terms proposed was that the Batavian officers would be allowed to go home on two of the Batavian frigates, designated as cartel ships. Elphinstone rejected these proposals, but offered to release the officers eventually, if they gave their parole. By 23:00, hopelessly outnumbered and with his crews in open rebellion, Lucas agreed to terms that dictated an almost unconditional surrender of the Batavian force. This was the next morning (17 August) agreed between Elphinstone and a Batavian parlimentaire, Captain Claris; Lucas signed the capitulation that afternoon.

== Orders of battle ==
=== Lucas' order of battle ===
Lucas' squadron
Ship	Ship type	Guns	Navy	Commander	Notes
Dordrecht	Ship of the line	66	Batavian Navy	Schout-bij-nacht Engelbertus Lucas	Carrying 370 crew and passengers. Commissioned into the Royal Navy as HMS Dortrecht
Revolutie	Ship of the line	66	Batavian Navy	Captain Jan Rhynbende	Carrying 400 crew and passengers. Commissioned into the Royal Navy as HMS Prince Frederick
Tromp	Ship of the line	54	Batavian Navy	Lieutenant Jan Valkenburg	Carrying 280 crew and passengers. Commissioned into the Royal Navy as HMS Tromp
Castor	Frigate	44	Batavian Navy	Captain Jacob Claris	Carrying 240 crew and passengers. Commissioned into the Royal Navy as HMS Saldanha
Braave	Frigate	40	Batavian Navy	Lieutenant Jacob Zoetemans	Carrying 234 crew and passengers. Commissioned into the Royal Navy as HMS Braave
Sirène	Sloop	26	Batavian Navy	Lieutenant Gustaaf Adolph de Valk	Carrying 130 crew and passengers. Commissioned into the Royal Navy as HMS Laurel
Bellona	Sloop	26	Batavian Navy	Lieutenant Christiaan De Cerf	Carrying 130 crew and passengers. Commissioned into the Royal Navy as HMS Vindictive
Havik	Sloop	18	Batavian Navy	Lieutenant Pieter Bessemer	Carrying 76 crew and passengers. Commissioned into the Royal Navy as HMS Havick
Vrouw Maria	East Indiaman		Dutch East India Company	Lieutenant Hermanus Barbier	Carrying 112 crew and passengers.
Source: James, p. 373, Clowes, pp. 295 & 559, "No. 13947". The London Gazette. 4 November 1796. pp. 1051–57.

=== Elphinstone's order of battle ===
Elphinstone's squadron
Ship	Rate	Guns	Navy	Commander	Notes
HMS Monarch	Third rate	74	Royal Navy	Vice-Admiral Sir George Keith Elphinstone; Captain John Elphinstone	Lost mainmast in storm before 12 August.
HMS Tremendous	Third rate	74	Royal Navy	Rear-Admiral Thomas Pringle; Captain John Aylmer	Damaged in storm on 13 August
HMS America	Third rate	64	Royal Navy	Captain John Blankett	
HMS Ruby	Third rate	64	Royal Navy	Captain Henry Edwin Stanhope	Damaged in storm before 12 August.
HMS Stately	Third rate	64	Royal Navy	Captain Billy Douglas	
HMS Sceptre	Third rate	64	Royal Navy	Captain William Essington	
HMS Trident	Third rate	64	Royal Navy	Captain Edward Oliver Osborn	Damaged in storm on 13 August.
HMS Jupiter	Fourth rate	50	Royal Navy	Captain George Losack	
HMS Crescent	Fifth Rate	36	Royal Navy	Captain Edward Buller	Damaged in storm on 13 August.
HMS Sphynx	Ship-Sloop	20	Royal Navy	Captain Andrew Todd	
HMS Mozelle	Ship-Sloop	20	Royal Navy	Captain Charles Brisbane	
HMS Echo	Ship-Sloop	16	Royal Navy	Captain Edward Ramage	
HMS Rattlesnake	Ship-Sloop	16	Royal Navy	Captain John Turner	
HMS Hope	Sloop	14	Royal Navy	Lieutenant Thomas Alexander	
Source: James, p. 373, Clowes, pp. 295 & 559, "No. 13947". The London Gazette. 4 November 1796. pp. 1051–57.

=== Merchant vessels captured by the British ===
In addition to the naval vessels that capitulated, the British also detained five merchant vessels at Simon's Bay on 18 August.

Vessel	Master	Burthen	Notes
Willemstadt en Boetzlaar	St. Kooter (or Simon Koter)	978	Arrived 10 May 1795 from the Texel; had landed her cargo. The only one of the five merchant vessels that the Royal Navy took into service
De Yonge Bonifacius	Jan Nicholas Croese	488	Jonge Bonifacius, Jan Nikolaas Kroese, master, arrived June 24, from Batavia, laden
Gertruyda	Marten De Vries	660	Geertruida arrived 9 May from Amsterdam; had landed her cargo
Het Vertrouven	Hilbrand van Wyen	890	Vertrouwen arrived 14 August from Batavia, laden
Louisa and Anthony	Kersjin Hilbrand	640	Louisa Anthony, Hillebrand van Uijen, master, arrived 14 August from Batavia, laden

== Aftermath ==
The Royal Navy took all the Batavian warships into its service. Elphinstone further attached the warships to the squadron at the Cape Colony, an action the Admiralty criticised. Elphinstone returned to Britain in October 1796. His flagship Monarch passed right through the French fleet of the Expédition d'Irlande during a snow storm, anchoring in a disabled state at Crookhaven on 25 December. Following his return he was made Baron Keith for his capture and retention of the Cape Colony. Most of the sailors and soldiers in the Batavian force were Germans and nearly all entered British service, either with the Royal Navy or the East India Company. Lucas and other Batavian officers later returned to Europe in the cartel Gertruida. One of the captured ships, HMS Dordrecht became notorious the following year when the crew mutinied at Saint Helena in imitation of the Spithead and Nore mutinies in Britain. Only the intervention of Captain Charles Brisbane, who threw a noose around the ringleader's neck and threatened death if the disobedience was repeated, succeeded in intimidating the mutinous sailors.

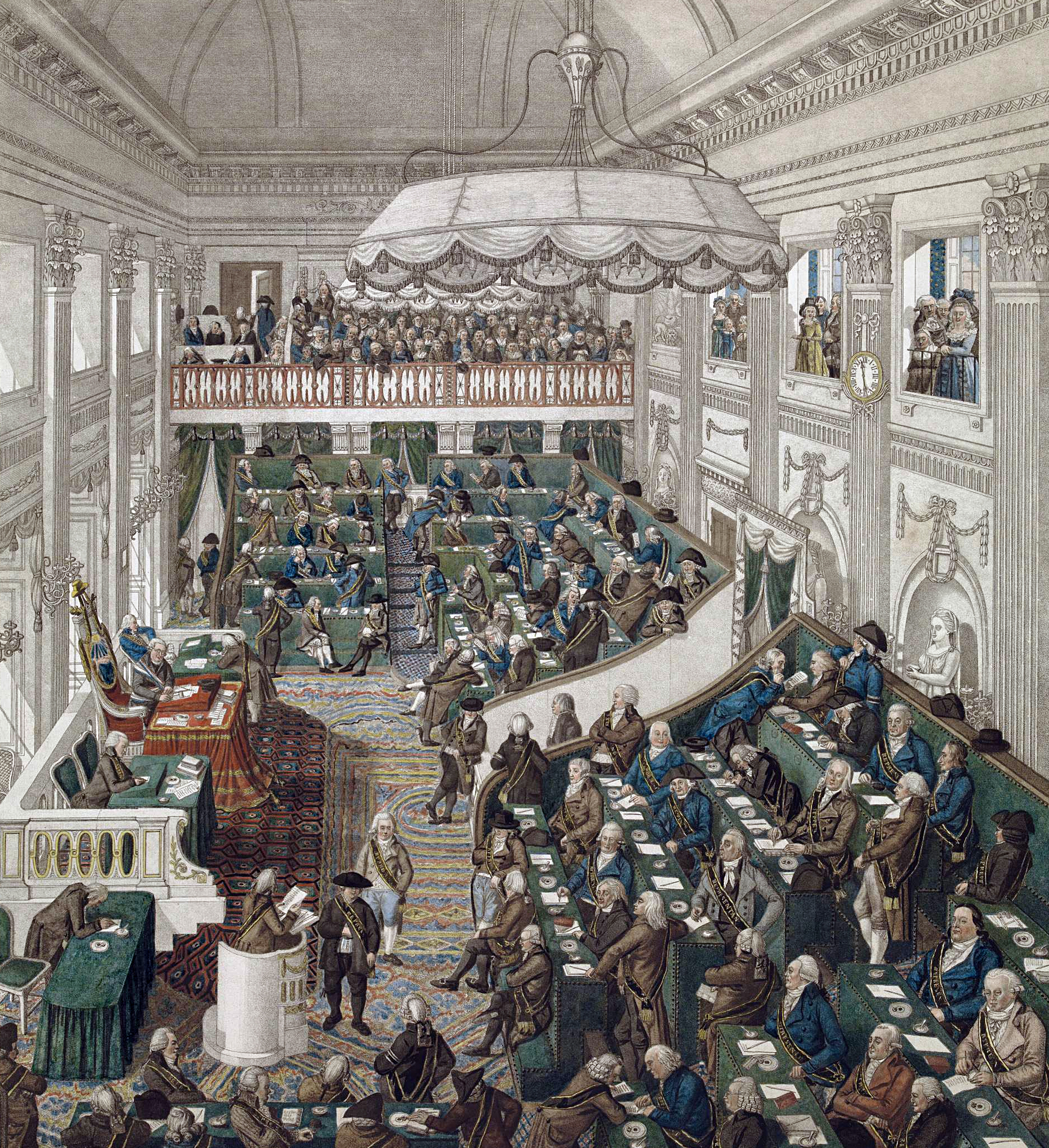
The National Assembly of the Batavian Republic, which ordered Lucas to be court-martialed for his capitulation

In the Batavian Republic, Lucas' surrender caused popular outrage. On his return he faced a court-martial ordered by the National Assembly of the Batavian Republic on 19 May 1797. Lucas died on 21 June, a few days before the trial was to start, and the court therefore decided on 26 June to charge the prosecutor Jacobus Spoors with holding an inquiry, in which all witnesses were deposed. On the basis of this report the court decided on 14 December to lay the main responsibility for the surrender with Lucas, and to acquit the other officers.

Historians have held Lucas blameless for refusing to engage Elphinstone's force, which was far superior in both ships and men. Elphinstone's ships carried more than twice as many men as the Batavian expedition, even before the British troops ashore are taken into account. Lucas could only muster 1,972 men compared with the 4,291 under Elphinstone's command. The expedition has however been criticised for its lack of preparedness; while it is true that promised French support failed to appear, the Batavian troops were insufficient in number to threaten seriously the British garrison. As Parkinson noted: "what could be the point of landing a few hundred men on a shore bristling with English bayonets?" An unintended effect of the campaign however was to further postpone a planned British invasion of isle de France, which Elphinstone had already postponed to prepare for Lucas' arrival and which was ultimately cancelled entirely.

There were no further attacks on the Cape Colony during the war. The Treaty of Amiens in 1802 returned the colony and all other captured Dutch colonies, except Ceylon, to the Batavian Republic. The peace was short-lived, and early in the Napoleonic Wars the British prepared another expeditionary force. In January 1806, the British again occupied the Cape Colony following their victory at the Battle of Blaauwberg. The colony remained part of the British Empire until its independence as part of a unified South Africa in 1910.
