= HMS Chatham (1758) =

Ship of the line of the Royal Navy

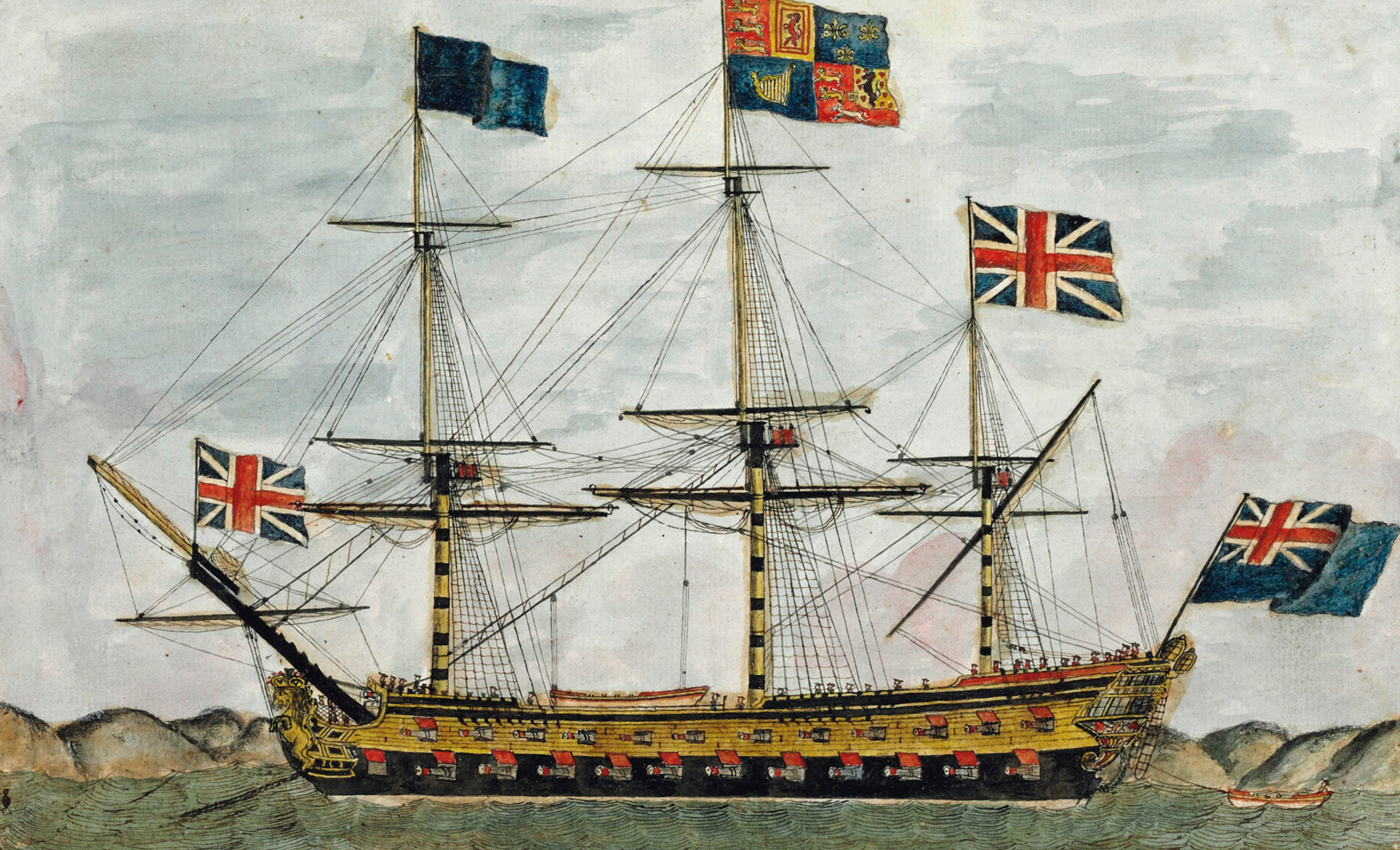
- 1770–1779 watercolour of Chatham

History

Great Britain
- Name: HMS Chatham
- Ordered: 8 November 1752
- Builder: Portsmouth Dockyard
- Launched: 25 April 1758
- Fate: Broken up, 1814

General characteristics
- Class & type: 1752 amendments 50-gun fourth rate ship of the line
- Tons burthen: 1052 (bm)
- Length: 147 ft (44.8 m) (gundeck)
- Beam: 40 ft 3 in (12.3 m)
- Depth of hold: 17 ft 8 in (5.4 m)
- Propulsion: Sails
- Sail plan: Full-rigged ship
- Armament: Gundeck: 22 × 24-pounder guns; Upper gundeck: 22 × 12-pounder guns; QD: 4 × 6-pounder guns; Fc: 2 × 6-pounder guns

HMS Chatham was a 50-gun fourth rate ship of the line of the Royal Navy, designed by Sir Joseph Allin and built by his son Edward Allin at Portsmouth Dockyard to the draught specified by the 1745 Establishment as amended in 1752, and launched on 25 April 1758.

== Career ==
The Chatham, was a part of the British flotilla anchored off Staten Island on 25 June 1776, in the opening phases of the Battle of Long Island.

On 2 September 1781 Chatham captured the French frigate Magicienne off Cape Ann after a sanguinary engagement. Magicienne was serving in Orvilliers' fleet under Captain Janvre de la Bouchetière In the action the French lost 60 men killed and 40 wounded; the British lost one man killed and one man wounded. Magicienne was described as being of 800 tons, 36 guns and 280 men. She was subsequently taken to Halifax and recommissioned in the Royal Navy as HMS Magicienne.

== Fate ==
Chatham was placed on harbour service in 1793, and continued in this role until 1814, when the decision was taken to have her broken up.
