= HMS Martin (1790) =

Ship-sloop of the Royal Navy

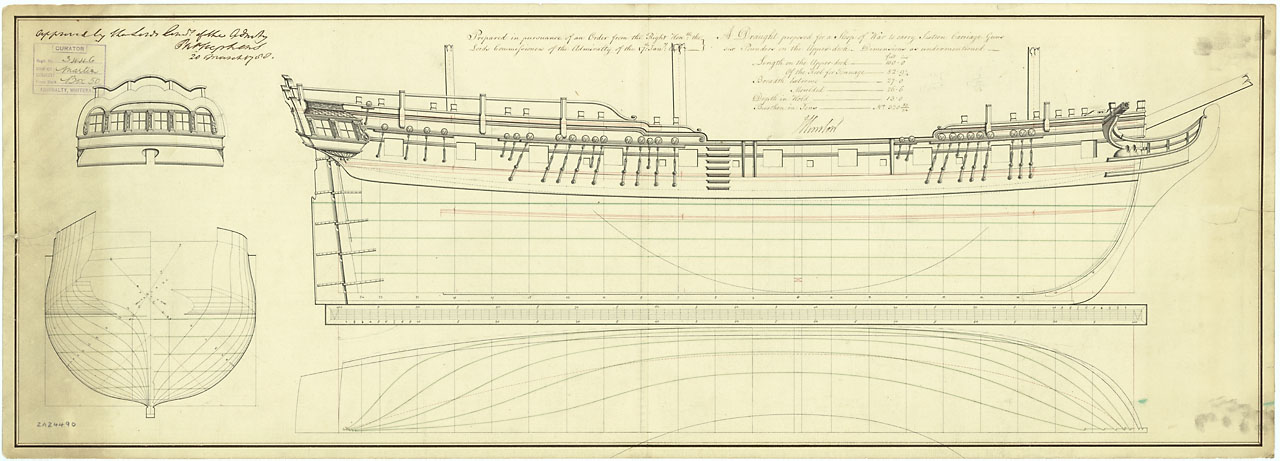
- Martin

History

Great Britain
- Name: HMS Martin
- Ordered: 17 January 1788
- Builder: Woolwich Dockyard
- Laid down: 15 July 1789
- Launched: 8 October 1790
- Commissioned: 13 January 1791
- Honours and awards: Naval General Service Medal clasp "Camperdown"
- Fate: Lost, presumed foundered October 1800

General characteristics
- Class & type: Hound-class ship-sloop
- Tons burthen: 3294/94 bm
- Length: 100 ft 8 1/2 in (30.7 m) (overall); 83 ft 6 3/4 in (25.5 m) (keel)
- Beam: 27 ft 2 1/2 in (8.3 m)
- Draught: 8 ft 01 in (2.5 m) (laden); 11 ft 6 in (3.5 m) (unladen)
- Depth of hold: 12 ft 10 1/2 in (3.9 m)
- Sail plan: Full-rigged ship
- Complement: 125 (from 1794, 121)
- Armament: Upper deck:16 × 6-pounder guns and 14 × 1/2-pounder swivel guns; Later: Upper deck:16 × 6-pounder guns; QD:4 × 12-pounder carronades; Fc:2 × 12-pounder carronades

HMS Martin was a 16-gun Hound-class ship-sloop of the Royal Navy. Launched in 1790 she served at the Battle of Camperdown in 1797 and captured two privateers before disappearing in 1800.

== Construction and commissioning ==
Martin was a Hound-class ship-sloop, built to a design by John Henslow and ordered from Woolwich Dockyard on 17 January 1788. Master Shipwright John Nelson worked on her until August 1790, after which William Rule completed her. She was launched on 8 October 1790 and commissioned on 13 January 1791, having cost a total of £8,732 to build, with a further £1,674 spent on fitting out.

== Career ==
Martin's first commander was George Duff, under whom she sailed off the East coast of Scotland. On 17 March 1792, in the Firth of Forth, the brig Paisley ran into Hales Castle, which sank. Paisley rescued three of Hales Castle's six crew and Martin rescued the other three.

Martin came under the command of Commander Richard Lane in February 1793, followed by Commander James Newman in May 1794 and then Commander Charles Garnier in August 1794. Commander William Lobb took over Martin in April 1795, during which time she served as a Royal escort for Princess Caroline of Brunswick. Samuel Sutton received promotion to commander on 1 September 1795 and replaced Lobb. Martin departed Britain for the West coast of Africa on 10 December 1795, followed by a voyage to Jamaica.

Returning to British waters, on 14 February 1797 Martin and HMS Espion captured the privateer Buonaparte in the North Sea. Buonaparte was armed with sixteen 6-pounder guns (eight of which she threw overboard during the chase), and one long 12-pounder gun. She had a crew of 110, of whom 82 were on board. She had sailed from Cherburg on the 1st of the month, but had captured only a sloop in ballast, which the British were able to recapture. (Note: Bonaparte, of Dunkirk, had been commissioned in December 1796. Her first cruise took place under Jean Meulenaer, with 24 men and 10 to 15 guns, from December 1796 to January 1797, when she returned to Dunkirk. She was on her second cruise in February under an unknown captain when Martin and Espion captured her. Bonapart had captured one vessel that she sent into Dunkirk before she herself was captured.)

While Martin was in the North Sea she also transported the Duc d'Angoulême, the future Charles X of France, from Leith to Cuxhaven. On 27 June Sutton's service brought him promotion to post-captain.

Martin immediately came under the command of Charles Paget, under whom she was present at the Battle of Camperdown on 11 October 1797. There she served to repeat signals for the starboard, or weather division under Admiral Adam Duncan, who was also the overall commander. In 1847 the Admiralty issued the Naval General Service Medal with clasp "Camperdown" to the 298 surviving claimants from the action.

In November 1797 Martin came under the command of Commander John Cleland; less than three months later, in January 1798, Commander William Renton replaced Cleland. In August, Martin captured "Three Greenland Vessels and One Dogger". Martin also shared in the capture on 24 October of the Batavian Navy corvette Waakzaamheid. The primary captor was Sirius, which captured Waakzaamheid and the frigate Furie near the Texel. Waakzaamheid was under the command of Senior Captain Meindert van Neirop. She was armed with twenty-four 9-pounder guns on her main deck and two 6-pounders on her forecastle. She had 100 Batavian sailors aboard her, as well as 122 French soldiers, and was carrying 2,000 stands of arms as well as other ordnance stores. Waakzaamheid put up no struggle. The sloop Kite, and the hired armed cutter Diligent, also shared in the capture.

Renton, while dining with another naval officer in Harwich in February 1799, went to an adjoining room and committed suicide with a pistol. Renton apparently "had for some time discovered the symptoms of a deranged mind".

His successor was Commander the Hon. Michael Sinclair or St. Clair, the brother of Lord Sinclair. Commander Sinclair and Martin then escorted convoys in the North Sea to Denmark.

On 28 April 1799 Martin captured the privateer cutter Vengeur some five leagues off The Skaw. Vengeur was in company with a lugger and another cutter, both of which escaped. Vengeur was armed with 14 guns and had a crew of 105 men under the command of Citizen Charles Louis Tack. (She may have thrown two guns overboard in the chase, and apparently only had 98 men aboard at the time of her capture.) She was out of Christiansand and had taken nothing.

At this time Martin operated out of Leith. John Brougham, youngest brother of Lord Brougham, was appointed to her as a midshipman and as did Charles John Napier, the future admiral, whose father was a friend of Sinclair; Martin was Napier's first ship. Brougham left her at Yarmouth in early 1800 and Napier transferred to HMS Renown in May 1800.

On 27 July Martin captured Hoffnung. Then on 8 and 9 October she captured Noodster and Jonge Isabella.

== Fate ==
Martin disappeared without trace and with all hands in the North Sea in October 1800. She is presumed to have foundered in heavy seas.
