= Hired armed cutter Diligent =

Diligent was a hired armed cutter of the Royal Navy which served in the French Revolutionary Wars. She was a small vessel, of 44 tons (bm) and six 2-pounder guns, and she served from 27 February 1793 to 1 November 1801.

Diligent recaptured the British merchantman Myrmidon from the French in 1797. Myrmidon had been sailing from Newcastle upon Tyne with a cargo of lumber when a French privateer captured her. Diligent sent her into Sheerness, where Myrmidon arrived around 14 July 1797.

Diligent, under the command of Mr. Matthew Randall, was in the fleet under Admiral Lord Duncan at the Battle of Camperdown on 11 October. Diligent's role was to stand off the larboard or lee division and repeat signals. After the battle, as a member of the fleet even though she did not participate in the combat, she was entitled to share in the £120,000 in prize money for the sale of the Dutch ships captured then. In 1847 the Admiralty awarded the Naval General service Medal with clasp "Camperdown" to any surviving claimants from the action. Diligent's officers and crew qualified. (Note: Steel gives the name of Diligent's commander at Camperdown as Lieutenant Thomas Dawson, as does Norie, but the medal announcement unambiguously name Mr. Randall as her commander. Dawson does show up in later announcements.'"`UNIQ--ref-00000005-QINU`"''"`UNIQ--ref-00000006-QINU`"')

In the action of 24 October 1798, Sirius captured two Batavian Navy warships, the frigate Furie and corvette Waakzaamheid near the Texel. The sloop Martin, Diligent, and several other vessels shared in the proceeds of the capture.

At some point, Diligent, still under Randall's command, recaptured William and Freedom.

In 1799 Diligent, under the command of Thomas Dawson, was on the Downs and North Sea station.

Diligente was among the vessels that shared in the proceeds of the capture of the galiot Neptunus on 29 March 1799.

Diligent participated in the Anglo-Russian invasion of Holland in the naval part of the expedition under the command of Vice-admiral Admiral Archibal Dickson Andrew Mitchell. On 27 August, Diligent participated in the capture of three Dutch vessels. Three days later, Diligent was among the British vessels at the Vlieter Incident, and therefore shared in the prize money for it too.

The sloop Inspector and Diligent detained Indian Chief, and some neutral vessels, on 30 August 1800. (Note: Prize money for some bales of linen on Indian Chief, net of costs for several detained neutral vessels, amounted to £1 11s 6d for a seaman.'"`UNIQ--ref-00000018-QINU`"')

On 15 December 1800, Admiral Archibald Dickson at Yarmouth Roads, sent Shannon, Bittern, the hired armed lugger Phoenix, and hired armed cutter Drake on a cruise to protect the homeward-bound Baltic fleet from French privateers, one having been reported off Scarborough. He stated in a letter that he intended to augment the patrol with Inspector and the cutters Hazardand Diligent when they arrived. (Note: Dickson's letter referred to Diligence, but there is no record of a hired cutter Diligence.)
