= HMS Sirius (1797) =

Frigate of the Royal Navy

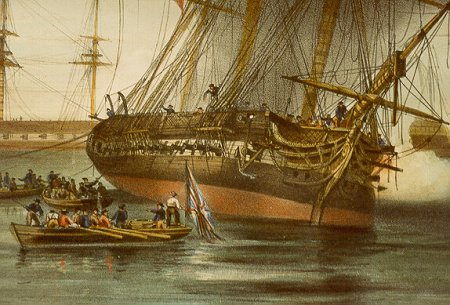
- HMS Sirius stranded on a coral shoal. Lithograph by A. Meyer (National Maritime Museum, London)

History

Great Britain
- Ordered: 30 April 1795
- Builder: John Dudman, Deptford
- Laid down: September 1795
- Launched: 12 April 1797
- Honours and awards: Naval General Service Medal with clasps: "Trafalgar"; "Sirius 17 April 1806"
- Fate: Destroyed by fire (scuttled), 25 August 1810

General characteristics
- Tons burthen: 104659/94 (bm)
- Length: 148 ft 10 in (45.4 m) (gundeck); 124 ft 0 1/8 in (37.8 m) (keel)
- Beam: 39 ft 10 in (12.1 m)
- Depth of hold: 13 ft 3 in (4.0 m)
- Sail plan: Full-rigged ship
- Complement: 247 officers and men
- Armament: Gundeck: 26 × 18-pounder guns; QD: 6 × 12-pounder guns; Fc: 2 × 9-pounder guns

HMS Sirius was a 36-gun fifth-rate frigate of the Royal Navy. Between 1797 and 1805, the Sirius was engaged in maintaining the blockade of Napoleonic Europe. She was lost in 1810 when her crew scuttled her after she grounded during the Battle of Grand Port.

== Design ==
Sirius general arrangement plan (National Maritime Museum, Greenwich)

The Admiralty ordered her construction on 30 April 1795, and the keel was laid at the Dudman's yard at Deptford Wharf in September of that year. She was launched on 12 April 1797. The Sirius class of 1795 was established following the taking of the San Fiorenzo from the Spanish in 1794, upon whose lines this frigate was based.

== French Revolutionary Wars ==
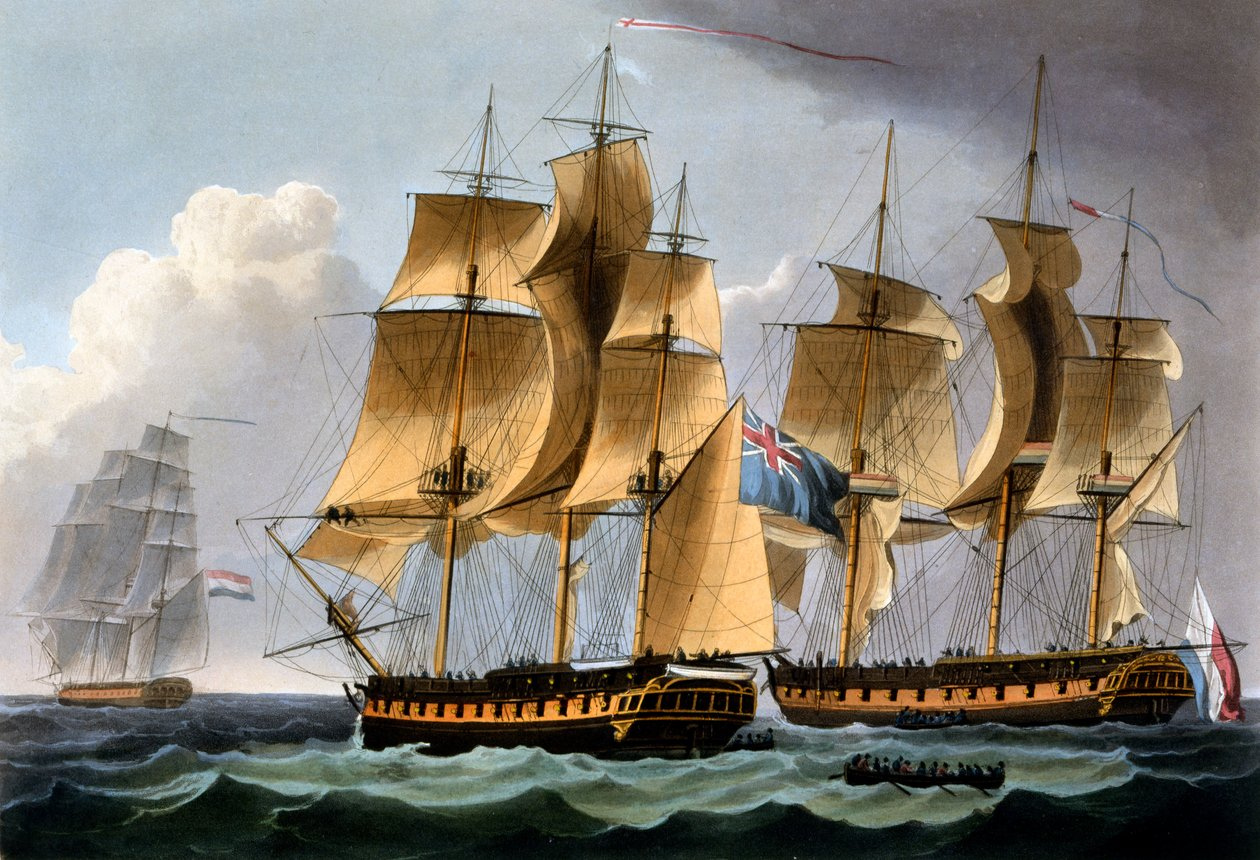
Capture of the Furie & Waakzamheid, 23 October 1798 Thomas Whitcombe, 1816.

Sirius was commissioned in May 1797 under the command of Captain Richard King. In the action of 24 October 1798, Sirius captured two Batavian Navy warships, the frigate Furie and corvette Waakzaamheid in the Texel. Waakzaamheid was under the command of Senior Captain Meindert van Neirop, and was armed with twenty-four 9-pounder guns on her main deck and two 6-pounders on her forecastle. She had 100 Batavian sailors and officers as well as 122 French soldiers aboard her, and was carrying 2,000 stands of arms as well as other ordnance stores. Waakzaamheid put up no struggle. The sloop Kite shared in the capture.

Furie was under the command of Bartholomeus Pletz and armed with twenty-six 12-pounders on her main deck and ten 6-pounders on her quarter-deck and forecastle. She had a crew of 153 Batavian sailors and officers augmented by 165 French troops. She was carrying 4,000 stands of arms as well as other ordnance stores. Furie did exchange fire with Sirius for about half an hour. Sirius had only one man wounded. Furie had eight men killed and 14 wounded. The sloop Martin and the hired armed cutter Diligent shared in the proceeds of the capture.

Sirius was among the vessels that shared in the capture on 25 and 28 November of a French brig and sloop. The British vessels included Clyde, Fisguard, and Sylph, as well as the hired armed cutters Joseph, Fowey and Dolly.

Then on 6 January 1800 Sirius shared with Defiance, Unicorn, Indefatigable and Stag in the capture of the French brig Ursule.

On 12 June Sirius and Indefatigable captured the French privateer Vengeur. She was armed with six long 4-pounders and ten 18-pounder carronades, and carried a crew of 102 men. She was two days out of Bordeaux and sailing for the coast of Brazil. Vengeur was sailing in company with three letters of marque – a ship, a brig and a schooner – that were bound for Guadeloupe. On 11 June Vengeur had captured the Jersey-privateer lugger Snake. (Note: When the crew of Vengeur came ashore one of the men from Venguer was discovered to have been one of the mutineers on Danae, which Indefatiagble had captured in 1798, and which had suffered a mutiny earlier in 1800. The mutineer was seized, court martialled, and hanged.)

On 3 July Sirius recaptured the brig Cultivator. Indefatigable and Boadicea were in company at the time of the capture. Cultivator, Smith, master, had been sailing from Demerara to London when the French privateer Minerve, of Bordeaux, had captured her.

The next day, Sirius and Indefatigable captured the French ship Favori. Eleven days later, Bordelais captured the French vessel Phoenix. Sirius was among the vessels sharing in the prize money by agreement. Sirius shared in the capture of the French privateer schooner Revanche on 28 July. The actual captor was Uranie. Revanche was armed with fourteen 6-pounder guns and had a crew of 80 men. She was 19 days out of Vigo and had already captured and sent in the English brig Marcus, a Portuguese ship, and a Spanish brig that had been a prize to Minerve.

On 11 December Sirius captured the Spanish merchant brig Melchora, some three miles off Sifarga (Illas Sisargas, some 20 miles west of A Coruña). The brig was 24 hours out of A Coruña on her way to Montevideo when Sirius captured her. Captain King reported the capture in order to draw attention to the fact that she was the only vessel to have left A Coruña since August. Diamond shared in the proceeds of the capture.

On 26 January 1801, the British frigate Oiseau encountered the French frigate Dédaigneuse and gave chase. Sirius and Amethyst joined the next day. On the 28th Oiseau and Sirius effected the capture while unfavorable winds kept Amethyst from joining the action. Dédaigneuse was brought into the Royal Navy as HMS Dedaigneuse. The next day Sirius was in company with Amethyst when they captured the Spanish letter of marque Charlotta of Ferol, 16 hours out of Ferol on her way to Curaçao. The capture took place about six or seven leagues from Cape Belem in Galicia. The hired armed cutter Earl of St Vincent shared in the capture.

On 29 January Atalante captured and destroyed the Spanish privateer Intrepido Cid. Sirius and Amethyst shared, by agreement, in the bounty-money.

Sirius shared by agreement in the proceeds of the capture of the Temeraire (30 May) and the Bien Aimé (23 July). In July Sirius was under the temporary command of Captain J.B. Edwards. In July Commander John Edwards took command temporarily.

In July–August 1802, Sirius was under the command of Captain King, who further had command of a small squadron on anti-smuggling duties. The other vessels in the squadron were Carysfort, Imogen, Rosario, and Peterell.

In August 1802, Captain William Prowse took command of Sirius.

== Napoleonic Wars ==
After the resumption of hostilities with France, Sirius took part in the blockade of Brest.

On 18 May 1803, Sirius and Nemesis captured Mere de Familie. (Note: The prize money for petty officers was £74 7s 11d; a seaman's share was worth £10 17s 5d, or almost six months' wages.) Ten days later Sirius captured the French ship Achille and then on 8 June Trois Freres. The capture of Aigle on 30 May resulted in a preliminary allotment to Sirius's crew of £6200 in prize money. Two days earlier Sirius had captured Zephyr. Sirius shared with Nemesis the proceeds of the capture of Trois Freres and Aigle.

Sirius then was among the vessels sharing in the salvage money from the recapture of Lord Nelson on 27 August. Similarly, Sirius shared in the salvage money for Perseverance, recaptured on 28 October.

On 15 February 1805, Sirius recaptured Spring. On 22 July Sirius participated in Calder's Action (Battle of Cape Finisterre (1805)). She shared in the prize money for the Spanish ships St. Raphael and Firme, and possibly other vessels as well.

=== Trafalgar ===
On 21 October, Sirius joined the British fleet under Vice Admiral Lord Nelson at Trafalgar. Entering battle to the north of the weather column, her station placed her only a few cable lengths from HMS Victory.

Parliament voted a grant of £300,000 to be distributed in September 1806 among the participants of the battle. (Note: The share of a petty officer was £26 6s; the share of a seaman or marine was £4 12s 6d.) Other distributions of prize money followed. (Note: The proceeds of hulls, starts, and head money for the four French and Spanish ships captured as well as the bounty-bill for the vessels destroyed was made available for payment in March 1807. The share of a petty officer was £10 14s 0d; the share of a seaman or marine was £1 17s 6d.) In 1847 the Admiralty would issue surviving claimants from the battle the Naval General Service Medal with clasp "Trafalgar".

On 25 November, Sirius, Prince and Swiftsure captured Nemesis.

=== Sirius vs. Bergère ===
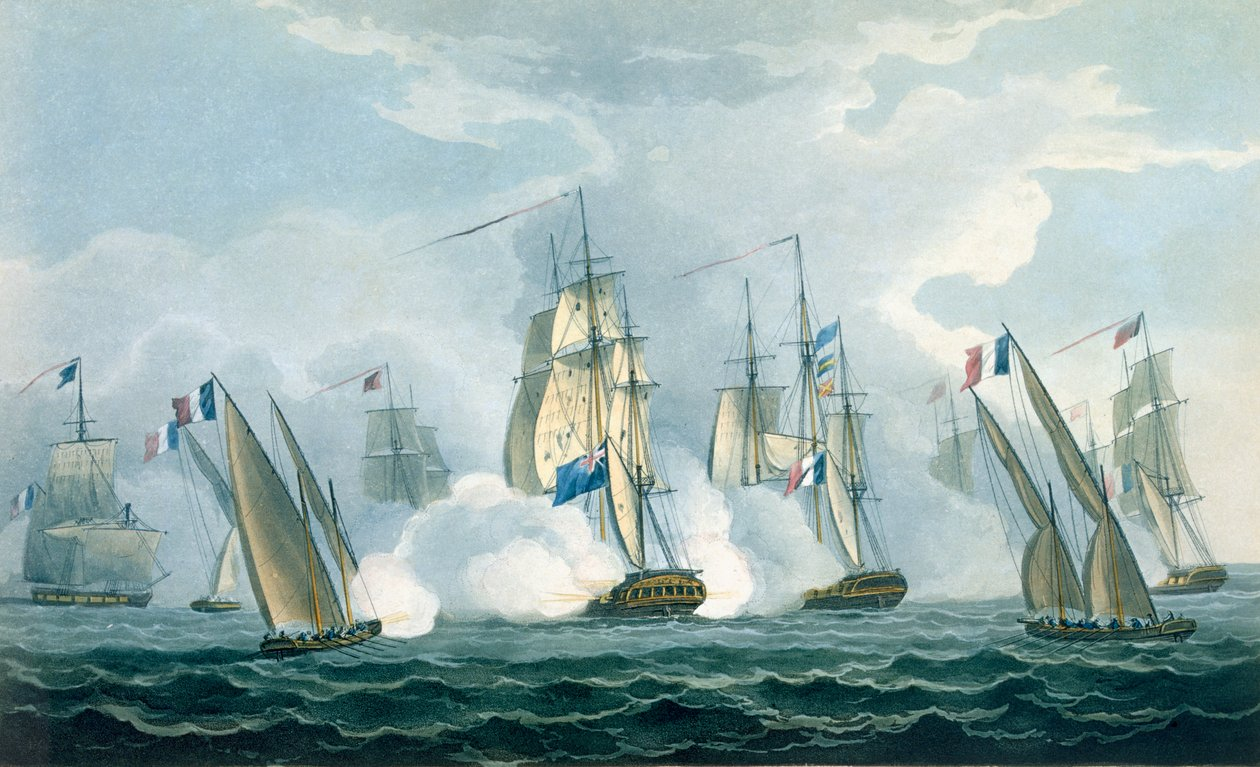
1820 illustration of Sirius engaging a French flotilla off the Tiber by Thomas Whitcombe

In January 1806, Sirius and the 64-gun Polyphemus were escorting a convoy from Gibraltar when they encountered a French squadron under Admiral Willaumez. The French succeeded in capturing two of the merchant vessels and four of the French fleet unsuccessfully chased Sirius for two hours, but forcing her to separate from the convoy.

From then until 1808 Sirius served in the Mediterranean. On 17 April 1806 at 2pm Sirius was five or six leagues off Civitavecchia when Prowse received intelligence that a French force had sailed that morning for Naples. He immediately set out and succeeded in catching up with them just after sunset two leagues from the mouth of the Tiber River. The force consisted of a ship, three corvettes, and five heavy gun-vessels, and they were deployed in line of battle near a dangerous shoal, awaiting Sirius's attack. The action commenced at 7pm and lasted for two hours before the French ship leading the flotilla struck. The water had been calm so the French had been able to fire well and Sirius herself was too damaged to pursue when the remainder of the French flotilla withdrew; Prowse was also concerned about the risks of pursuit at night in water with shoals.

The captured vessel was the Bergère, which was under the command of capitaine de frégate Charles-Jacques-César Chaunay-Duclos, commodore of the flotilla and member of the Legion of Honor. She was armed with eighteen 12-pounder guns and one 36-pounder obusier, and had a crew of 189 men. Prowse described her as "remarkably fine Vessel, sails well, and is fit for His Majesty's Service." (Note: The Royal Navy acquired her as HMS Bergere, but by August 1807 she was laid up in ordinary; she was broken up in 1811. The other French vessels were the brig-corvettes Abeille (eighteen 8-pounder guns and two brass 36-pounder obusiers, with 160 men), Legère and Janus (each with twelve 8-pounder guns), bombard Victoire (twelve 18-pounder guns and two 68-pounder carronades), cutter Gauloise, and gun-ketches Jalouse, Gentille, and Provençal (each carrying four 4-pounder guns and one brass 36-pounder obusier).) Prowse omitted mention of French casualties, but Sirius lost nine men killed, including Prowse's nephew, and 20 men wounded, nine dangerously so. This action too qualified the surviving claimants for the Naval General Service Medal, this time with the clasp "Sirius 17 April 1806".

Between April 1808 and January 1809 Sirius was at Chatham, undergoing repairs. In November 1808 Captain Samuel Pym assumed command of Sirius. On 24 February 1809 he sailed for the Cape of Good Hope and the Indian Ocean.

=== Indian Ocean ===
On 2 March 1809 Sirius captured the French schooner Mecontent, and her cargo. In August Sirius joined a squadron under Commodore Josias Rowley and on 21 September participated in an attack on Saint-Paul, Réunion.

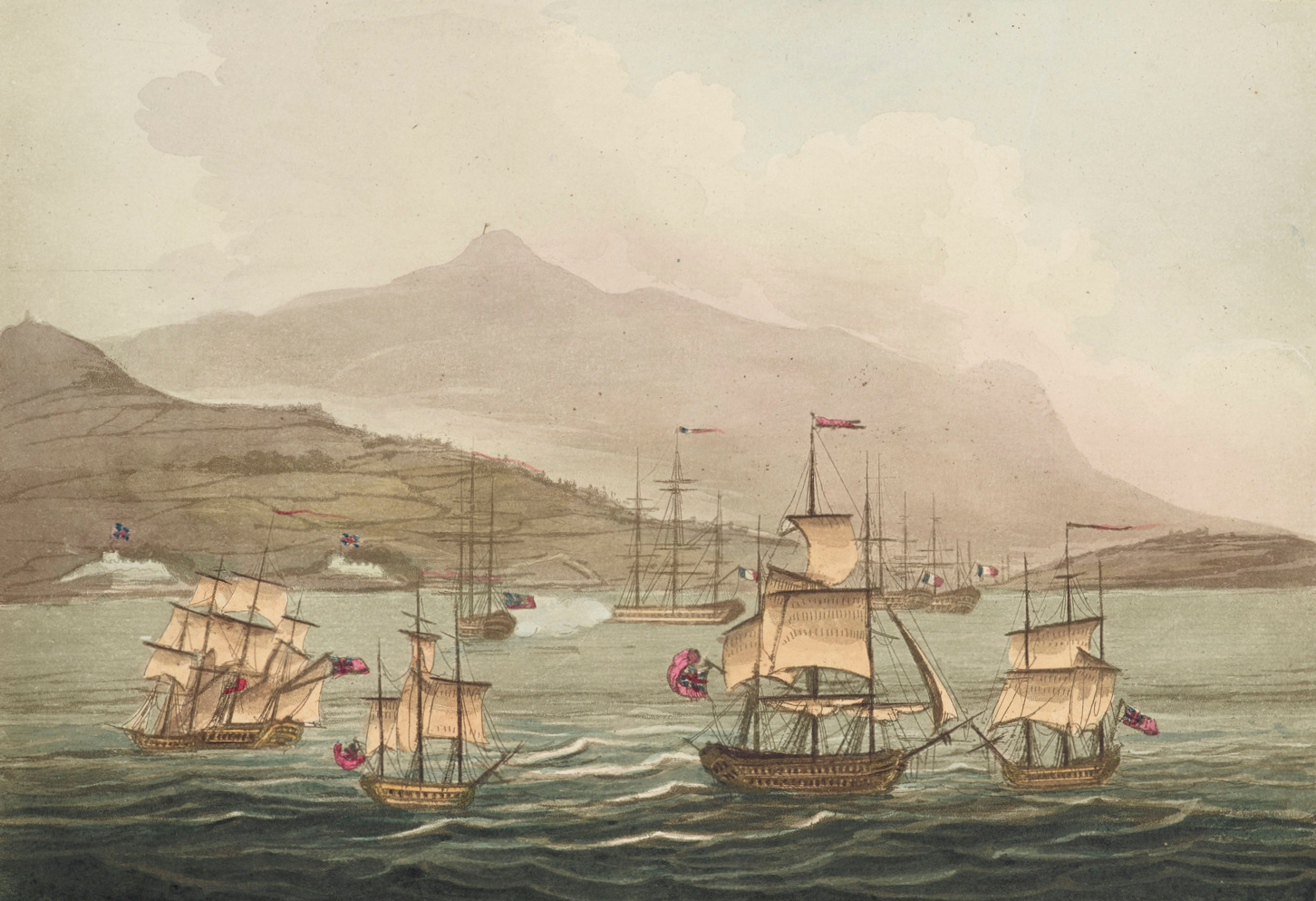
The raid on Saint-Paul, showing Sirius raking Caroline

Sirius and HMS Raisonnable captured the French frigate Caroline. She was taken into British service as HMS Bourbonaise, there already being an HMS Caroline. The British also recaptured several East Indiamen that Caroline had captured, and the East India Company's brig Grappler. The land attack succeeded in capturing a number of shore batteries and guns. Sirius suffered the loss of two marines killed, two marines wounded, and one sailor missing.

The summer of 1810 saw a campaign against the French Indian Ocean possessions. The British captured the Île Bourbon (Réunion) in July. In August, they turned their attention to Mauritius, where they attempted to land troops to destroy coastal batteries and signals around Grand Port. The attempt turned sour, however, when two French forty-gun frigates, Bellone and Minerve, the 18-gun corvette Victor, and two East Indiaman prizes entered the harbour and took up defensive positions at the head of the main entrance channel. The French also moved the channel markers to confuse the British approach.

On 23 August 1810 the British squadron entered the channel. Sirius was the first to run aground, followed by Magicienne and Néréide. Iphigenia prudently anchored in the channel some distance from the action. The French vessels concentrated all their gunfire first against Néréide and then against Magicienne. The battle continued without interruption all night and on 24 August the French boarded the defenceless Néréide. Once the French flag was hoisted on what was left of the foremast of the Néréide, Magicienne and the Sirius began an intense cross fire against their enemies. Still, in the evening her crew had to abandon Magicienne, setting her on fire as they left her.

== Loss ==
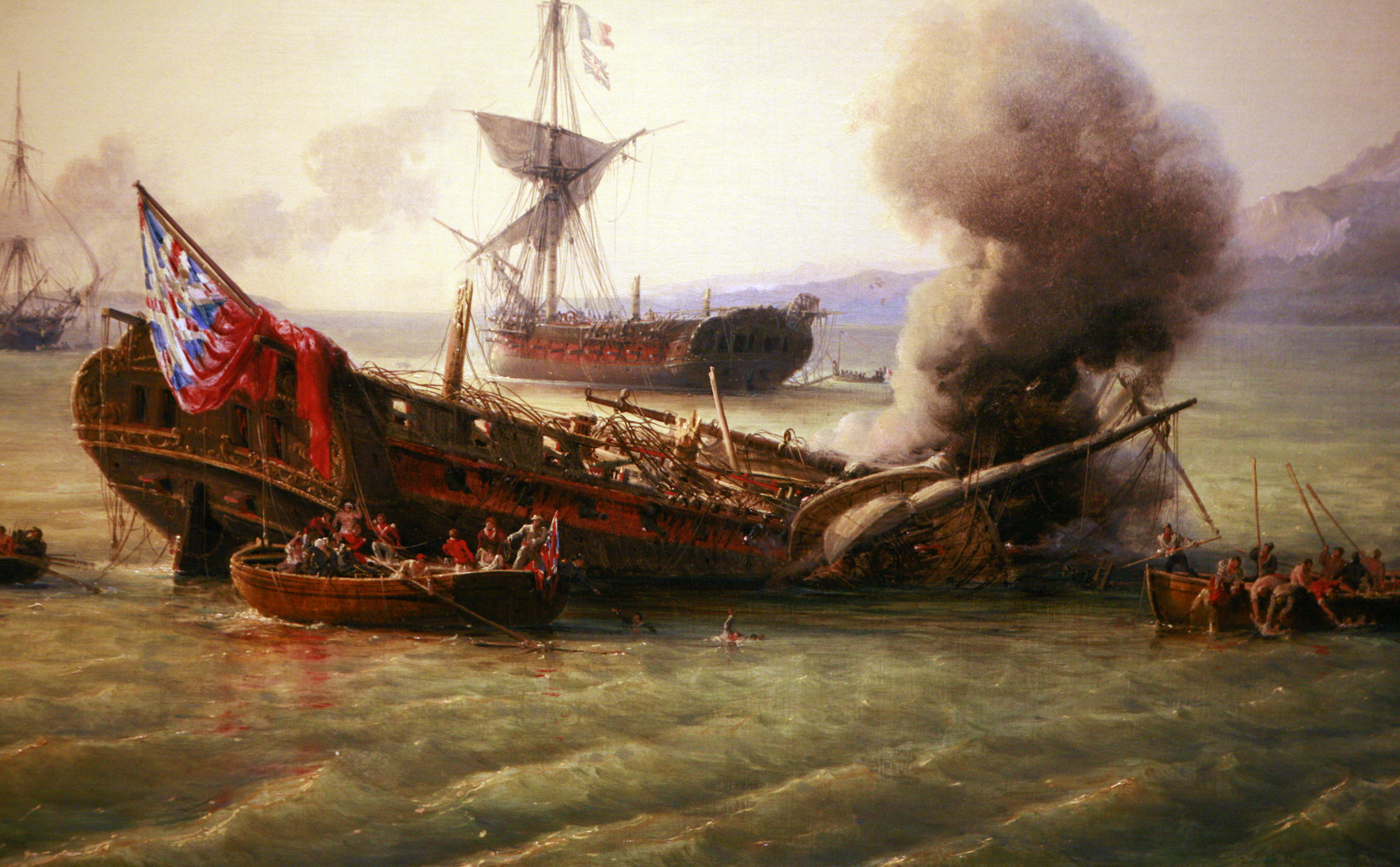
Scuttling of Sirius

Every effort to kedge Sirius off failed; she was firmly aground, taking on water, and unable to be freed. Pym ordered the transfer of her stores and provisions to Iphigenia. When this was complete the men left, the last of the crew leaving on the morning of 25 August 1810. As they left they set fire to her; Sirius exploded at about eleven o'clock, with her hull then briefly drifting off the reef before sinking.

The Battle of Grand Port was an important victory for the French. With two British frigates captured (Iphigenia and Néréide), and two others scuttled (Sirius and Magicienne), as well as 1,600 prisoners taken against 150 French dead or wounded, this battle marks the worst British naval defeat of the French Revolutionary and Napoleonic Wars.

== Post script ==
Sirius lies in some 20–25 metres (66–82 ft) of water. The wreck has been broken up, as much by salvors as by her scuttling. Still, the site is of archaeological interest and many of her cannon rest exposed.
