= HMS Wilhelmina =

Troopship of the Royal Navy

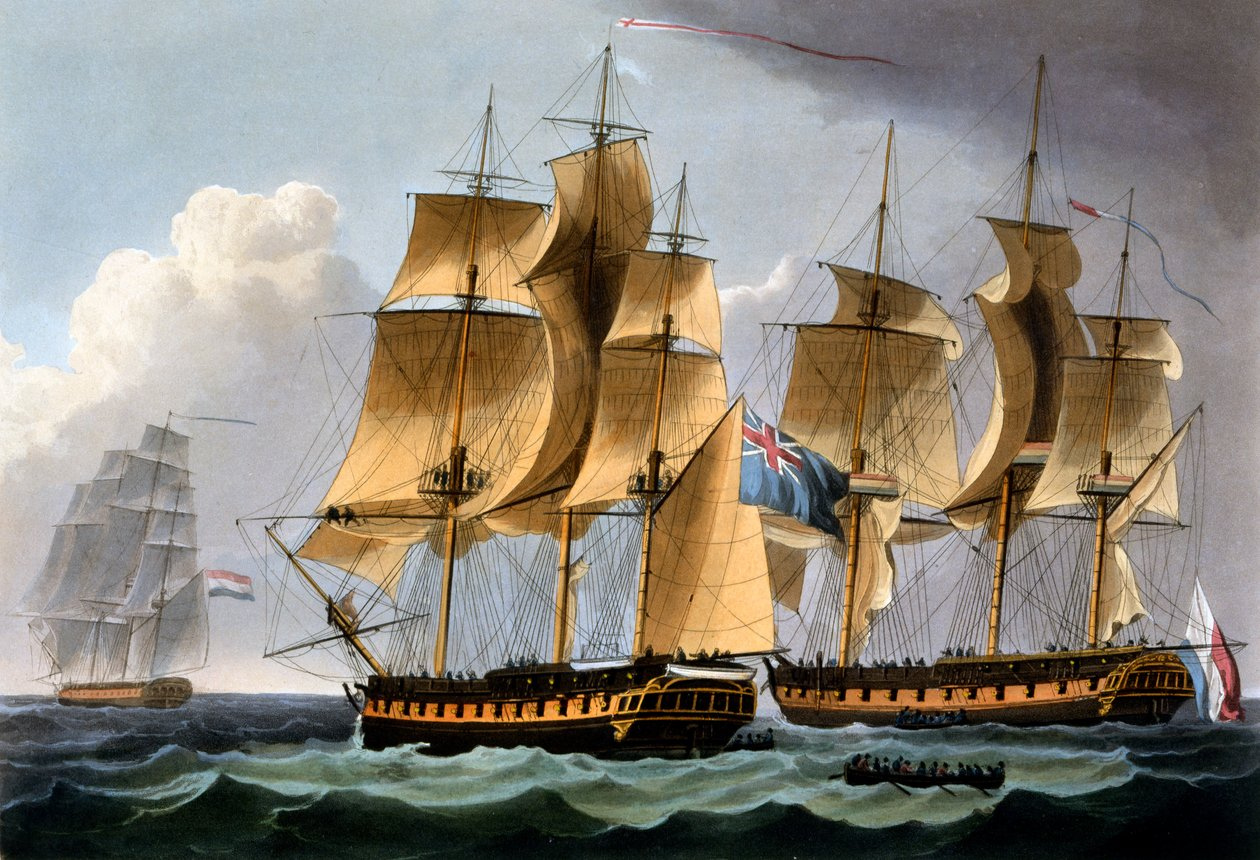
- Furie (first from left) at the action of 24 October 1798

History

Dutch Republic
- Name: Wilhelmina
- Builder: Vlissingen
- Launched: 1787

Batavian Republic
- Name: Furie
- Captured: By the Royal Navy on 24 October 1798

Great Britain
- Name: HMS Wilhelmina
- Acquired: 24 October 1798
- Honours and awards: Naval General Service Medal (NGSM) with clasp "Egypt"
- Fate: Sold in January 1813

General characteristics
- Class & type: 36-gun fifth-charter frigate; 20-gun troopship
- Tons burthen: 82681/94 (bm)
- Length: 133 ft (40.5 m) (overall); 109 ft 1 in (33.2 m) (keel)
- Beam: 37 ft 9 in (11.5 m)
- Depth of hold: 12 ft 4 in (3.76 m)
- Propulsion: Sails
- Sail plan: Full-rigged ship
- Complement: 244 (121 as troopship)
- Armament: As frigate: Upper deck: 26 × 12-pounder guns; QD: 4 × 6-pounder guns; Fc: 2 × 6-pounder guns + 4 × 24-pounder carronades; As troopship: Upper deck: 18 × 9-pounder guns; QD/Fc: 2 × 6-pounder guns + 1 × 12-pounder carronades

HMS Wilhelmina was a 20-gun troopship of the Royal Navy. She was originally the 36-gun Dutch States Navy frigate Wilhelmina, launched at Vlissingen in 1787. After France occupied the Dutch Republic and reorganised it into the Batavian Republic in 1795, Wilhelmina was renamed Furie and incorporated into the Batavian Navy. In the action of 24 October 1798, Furie and the Batavian corvette Waakzaamheid were intercepted by the British frigate Sirius while transporting supplies and French troops to support a rebellion against British rule in Ireland.

Sirius captured the two ships, both of which the Royal Navy took into service. Returned to her original name, Wilhelmina was converted into a troopship and spent the bulk of her career in the East Indies. There, she fought off a large French privateer and almost faced a superior French squadron at the Battle of Vizagapatam in September 1804 but was replaced beforehand by the 50-gun ship of the line HMS Centurion. Wilhelmina spent the rest of her career as a guard ship in Penang, and was sold out of service there in 1813.

== Dutch career and capture ==
Wilhelmina was built and launched at Vlissingen in 1787, and armed with 36 guns. She served for eight years in the Dutch States Navy until French forces overran the Dutch Republic in 1795 and reorganising it into the Batavian Republic. This led to Wilhelmina being renamed Furie and incorporated into the new Batavian Navy.

In 1798, she was part of the Batavian contribution to French efforts to support a rebellion against British rule in Ireland by the Society of United Irishmen. Furie, under Captain Bartholomeus Pletz and accompanied by the 24-gun corvette Waakzaamheid under Captain Meindert van Neirop, was dispatched to transport military supplies and French troops to support the rebellion. Furie embarked 165 soldiers and Waakzaamheid 122. In addition, the ships carried over 6,000 stands of arms and large quantities of other military stores with which to arm the United Irishmen rebels that they expected to meet.

The two ships set sail for Ireland on the night of 23 October, and by 08:00 were 30 nautical miles (56 km) northwest of the Texel, sailing westwards towards the English Channel. There, the British frigate Sirius, under Captain Richard King, spotted them. Sirius had been stationed off the Texel to watch for Batavian movements and intercept any ships of smaller or equal size entering or leaving the waterway. Although the Batavian ships outgunned the British, Sirius was much larger and faster, and the Batavians were also hampered by their position: the two ships were more than 2 nautical miles (3.7 km) apart, too far to offer mutual support against their opponent.

King first attacked the smaller and slower Waakzaamheid, avoiding contact with the larger Furie as he did so. At 09:00 Sirius came alongside Waakzaamheid and fired a gun at her, prompting van Neirop to strike his colours immediately. King secured Waakzaamheid and set off in pursuit of Furie, which was attempting to flee westwards. The chase lasted the rest of the day, with Sirius eventually coming within range at 17:00. The two ships exchanged broadsides for half an hour, as Pletz attempted to maneuver out of King's range. Furie was soon badly damaged whereas only one Batavian shot had struck Sirius, on the bowsprit. At approximately 17:30, Pletz struck his colours, having lost eight dead and 14 wounded; Sirius had only one man wounded. King transferred the prisoners and placed a prize crew on Furie before returning to the Nore with his prizes.

== British career ==
Furie came into Sheerness on 17 November 1798. She was commissioned as HMS Wilhelmina under Captain David Atkins in January 1800 and was then fitted as a troopship at Woolwich between January and September 1800 for the sum of £10,914. Captain Charles Herbert took command in April that year and Commander James Lind succeeded him in 1801.

Wilhelmina was among the vessels that served during the British campaign in Egypt between 8 March and 2 September. She carried troops for General Ralph Abercromby's landing at Abū Qīr, in the face of strenuous opposition. Because Wilhelmina served in the navy's Egyptian campaign (8 March to 2 September 1801), her officers and crew qualified for the clasp "Egypt" to the Naval General Service Medal, which the Admiralty issued in 1847 to all surviving claimants.

Lind sailed Wilhelmina to the East Indies later that year. In 1802 she was in the Red Sea, supporting General Baird's expedition to Egypt to help General Ralph Abercromby expel the French there. On 14 June 1802 the transport Calcutta wrecked on the Egyptian coast in the Red Sea. She was carrying 331 men of the 80th Regiment of Foot and 79 native Indian followers. Romney arrived the next day, as did two transports. Only Romney was able to get her boats out but they were able to rescue and deliver to the shore all but seven men who had died in an early attempt to reach shore. Captain Sir Home Riggs Popham left HMS Duchess of York to salvage anything that could be salvaged and then sailed to Suez from whence he dispatched Wilhelmina to pick up the troops on the 15th and carry them back to India.

Lind remained with Wilhelmina until 1803. She then came under the temporary command of Lieutenant William Dobbie.

In May 1803 Commander Henry Lambert took command. In September Whilhelmina stopped briefly at Hambantota, Ceylon, where she dropped off an eight-man detachment from the Royal Artillery, who reinforced the British garrison there and later helped it repel a Kandian attack.

=== Battling the Psyche ===
On 9 April 1804 Wilhelmina was escorting the country ship William Petrie to Trincomalee when she sighted a strange sail. The unknown ship was the 36-gun French privateer Psyche, under the command of Captain Trogoff.

Psyche outgunned Wilhelmina, which was armed en flûte. Nevertheless, Lambert sailed towards Psyche to give William Petrie a chance to escape.

Light winds meant that the engagement did not begin until 11 April, when both ships opened fire, exchanging broadsides and attempting to tack around to rake their opponent. After several hours fighting, Psyche broke off and fled. Both ships had sustained heavy damage, Wilhelmina to her masts and rigging, while Psyche was in a near-sinking condition. Wilhelmina had nine of her crew wounded, three mortally and six slightly, while Psyche lost ten killed and 32 wounded, 13 of them mortally. Wilhelmina put into port, while William Petrie also arrived safely at her destination.

Almost a year later, on 14 February 1805, Lambert, now Captain (Acting) of San Fiorenzo would meet Psyche, now a frigate of the French Navy, in battle off the Malabar Coast of India. Lambert was victorious in a sanguinary action that resulted in the British taking Psyche into service as HMS Psyche. In 1847 the Admiralty awarded the Naval General Service Medal with clasp "San Fiorenzo 14 Feby. 1805" to any still surviving claimants from the action.

=== Missed battle ===
In mid-1804 Wilhelmina was assigned to escort a small convoy of East Indiamen. Because a French squadron under Contre-Admiral Charles-Alexandre Durand Linois was raiding merchant shipping in the East Indies, the British commander in the area, Admiral Peter Rainier decided to replace Wilhelmina with the larger HMS Centurion. Consequently, it was Centurion that resisted Linois's forces at the Battle of Vizagapatam in September 1804.

== Fate ==
Captain Charles Foote took command of Wilhelmina in 1807, followed in an acting capacity by Commander William Hext in April 1809. She remained in the East Indies during this entire period. Commander Samuel Leslie took over in March 1811, followed in 1812 by Lieutenant George Norton. She became the guardship at Prince of Wales Island (Penang), and was sold out of service there in January 1813.
