= HMS Achille (1798) =

Royal Navy ship

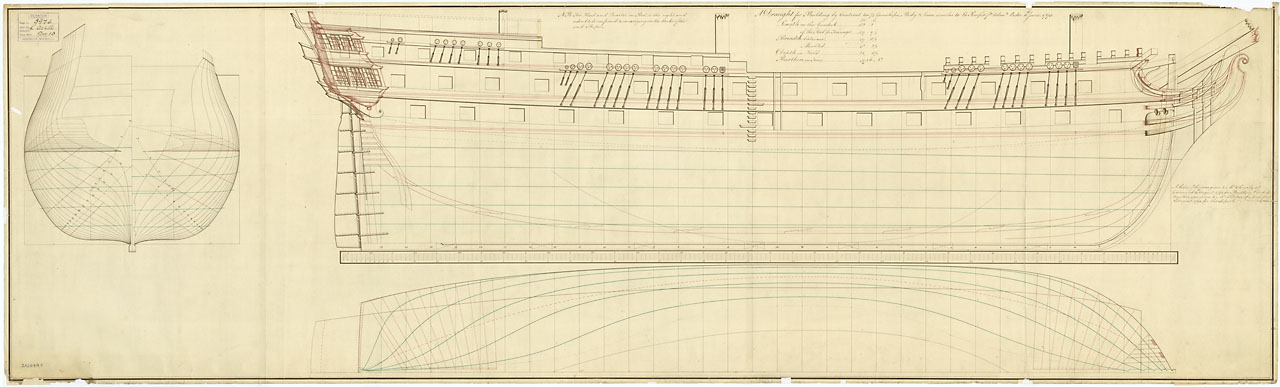

History

Great Britain
- Name: HMS Achille
- Ordered: 10 June 1795
- Builder: Cleverley, Gravesend
- Laid down: October 1795
- Launched: 16 April 1798
- Honours and awards: Participated in: Battle of Trafalgar
- Fate: Sold, 1865

General characteristics
- Class & type: Pompée-class ship of the line
- Tons burthen: 1,981
- Length: 182 ft 2 in (55.52 m) (gundeck)
- Beam: 49 ft (15 m)
- Depth of hold: 21 ft (6.4 m)
- Sail plan: Full-rigged ship
- Armament: 74 guns: Gundeck: 28 × 32-pounders; Upper gundeck: 30 × 18-pounders; Quarterdeck: 12 × 9-pounders; Forecastle: 4 × 9-pounders

HMS Achille (Note: Lavery lists her as Achilles.) was a 74-gun third-rate ship of the line of the Royal Navy. She was built by Cleverley Bros., a private shipyard at Gravesend, and launched on 16 April 1798. Her design was based on the lines of the captured French ship Pompée. She was the fourth Royal Navy ship to be named after the Greek hero Achilles in the French style.

== Achille at Trafalgar ==
On 21 October 1805, under the command of Captain Richard King, Achille was in Admiral Collingwood's column at the Battle of Trafalgar, seventh in the line, between Colossus and Revenge. Achille opened fire on the rear of the French and Spanish fleet at 12.15, engaging the 74-gun Montanes, for fifteen minutes, before sailing on to meet Argonauta of 80 guns, which had already been battling with other British ships. After hours of fierce fighting, Argonauta fell silent and closed her gunports, but before Achille could accept her surrender, her French namesake Achille of 74 guns, moved in to engage the British ship. After exchanging broadsides, the French ship sailed on and was replaced on the starboard side by the 74-gun French ship Berwick, and for the next hour and a quarter she lay close alongside Achille, receiving a pounding that eventually forced Berwick to surrender with over 250 casualties – almost half her crew. Achille took possession, and transferred some of her crew back on board as prisoners. Achille suffered 13 killed and 59 wounded in the battle, in stark comparison to the heavy losses she inflicted on her French and Spanish adversaries. (Note: Montanes lost 20 killed and 29 wounded, Argonauta lost 103 killed and 202 wounded, Berwick lost an estimated 75 killed and 125 wounded.)

On 17 July 1812, boats from Achille and Cerberus captured or destroyed 12 enemy trabaccolos off Venice.

== Fate ==
Achille continued in active service until 1815, when she was decommissioned at Chatham, and laid up at Sheerness. She survived in this state until 1865, when she was sold for £3,600 to be broken up.

== Bibliography ==
- Adkin, Mark (2005). The Trafalgar Companion: A Guide to History's Most Famous Sea Battle and the Life of Admiral Lord Nelson. Aurum Press. ISBN 1-84513-018-9.
- Colledge, J. J.; Warlow, Ben & Bush, Steve (2020). Ships of the Royal Navy: The Complete Record of all Fighting Ships of the Royal Navy from the 15th Century to the Present (5th revised and updated ed.). Seaforth Publishing. ISBN 978-1-5267-9327-0.
- Lavery, Brian (1984). The Ship of the Line. Vol. 1: The Development of the Battlefleet 1650-1850. Naval Institute Press. ISBN 0-85177-252-8.
- Winfield, Rif (2008) [2005]. British Warships in the Age of Sail 1793–1817: Design, Construction, Careers and Fates (2nd, revised ed.). Seaforth. ISBN 978-1-84415-717-4.
