= Henry Lambert =

Officer of the British Royal Navy

Captain Henry Lambert
- Died: 4 January 1813; Salvador, Brazil
- Military career
- Allegiance: United Kingdom
- Branch: Royal Navy
- Rank: Captain
- Conflicts: French Revolutionary Wars; Battle of Hyères; Napoleonic Wars; Capture of Psyché; Battle of Grand Port; War of 1812; Defeat by USS Constitution

Captain Henry Lambert (died 4 January 1813) was an officer of the British Royal Navy during the French Revolutionary and Napoleonic Wars and the War of 1812. During his career, Lambert served in numerous ships and several military actions with success, participating in the capture of Île Bonaparte in the Indian Ocean as second in command under Josias Rowley. Lambert is best known however for being captain of the frigate HMS Java on 29 December 1812 when she was captured in the Mid-Atlantic by USS Constitution during the War of 1812. Lambert was mortally wounded in the battle and died seven days later in Salvador, Brazil.

== Career ==
Lambert was the son of naval Captain Robert Lambert and entered the navy at an early age aboard HMS Cumberland in 1795. Serving in the Mediterranean, Cumberland was heavily engaged at the Battle of Hyères where the French ship of the line Alcide was blown up. For the next six years, Lambert served in the Mediterranean on board the frigate HMS Virginie and the ship of the line HMS Suffolk before obtaining promotion to lieutenant in 1801. He later joined HMS Victorious and the following year HMS Centurion during the Peace of Amiens.

At the outbreak of the Napoleonic Wars in 1803, Lambert was promoted to be commander of the 20-gun HMS Wilhelmina. In April 1804 he fought off the 36-gun French privateer Psyché on the East India Station. The following year he became a post captain in command of the 44-gun frigate HMS San Fiorenzo. As captain of San Fiorenzo, in February 1805 he encountered the Psyché again, now a frigate of the French Navy. This time Lambert captured her. He then sailed San Fiorenzo back to Britain in June.

In 1808 Lambert took command of the frigate HMS Iphigenia, initially based at Quebec, but later transferring back to the Indian Ocean where he had previously been successful. Attached to the squadron then besieging Île Bonaparte and Île de France under Josias Rowley, in July 1810 Lambert participated in the successful invasion of Île Bonaparte. The following month, Lambert was part of a frigate squadron led by Samuel Pym which attempted to raid the anchorage of Grand Port on Île de France. Due to poor charts of the numerous reefs within the harbour, the attack was a disaster, with two frigates destroyed and two more, including Iphigenia severely damaged and captured. Lambert and his crew were released from captivity following the successful invasion of Île de France and honourably acquitted in the court martial inquiring into the loss of their ship, which had also been recaptured.

In 1812, Lambert was given command of HMS Java, originally a French frigate captured during the Mauritius campaign. On 29 December, Java engaged the larger American frigate USS Constitution which captured Java in a bitter battle, Lambert opting to engage the American ship rather than flee in the hope of inflicting such damage that Constitution would be forced to retire to the US for repairs. In the event, Java was captured and destroyed and Lambert mortally wounded by a musket ball in the chest. Despite the efforts of the American surgeon aboard Constitution, Lambert died on 4 January 1813 in Salvador, Brazil from the effects of his wounds and was buried the following day.

== Literature ==
Henry Lambert is a character in Fortune of War, which is the sixth novel in Patrick O'Brian's Aubrey–Maturin series. In the book, he is mortally wounded in combat aboard HMS Java, just as in real life. He was also named in the fourth novel, The Mauritius Command, as captain of the Iphigenia, as in real life. Oddly, when Aubrey meets him in Fortune of War there is no reference to their service together two years earlier.

== Family ==
He was the son of Captain Robert Lambert RN, younger brother of Rear Admiral Robert Lambert RN, General Sir John Lambert, Major General Samuel Lambert and older brother of Admiral Sir George Lambert RN.
