= Peter Aplin =

Royal Navy Admiral (1753–1817)

Admiral Peter Aplin
- Born: 1753
- Died: 17 April 1817 (aged 63–64)
- Military career
- Allegiance: United Kingdom
- Branch: Royal Navy
- Service years: c.1775–1817
- Rank: Admiral of the White
- Commands: HMS Strombolo; HMS Swift; HMS Lucifer; HMS Fowey; HMS Hector
- Conflicts: American Revolutionary War; Battle of Long Island; Siege of Yorktown; French Revolutionary Wars

Admiral Peter Aplin (1753 – 17 April 1817) was an English admiral.

== Life ==
He was midshipman of the Roebuck on 9 October 1776, when her first lieutenant was killed in action with the batteries at the mouth of North River and was promoted to the vacancy caused by his death. Aplin's further promotion was rapid, and on 23 November 1780 he was appointed captain of the Fowey, a frigate of 24 guns. He was still in her at Yorktown in the following October, when she was destroyed by the enemy's red-hot shot; after which he served, with his crew, on shore under the orders of Lord Cornwallis. He had no further service at sea until, in 1797, he was appointed to the Hector of 74 guns, which, after the Battle of Cape St Vincent reinforced the fleet off Cádiz. He continued in this command for nearly two years, when he was promoted to flag rank. As an admiral, however, he never served, although, he passed through the several gradations by seniority, and attained the high rank of admiral of the white before his death, which occurred on 17 April 1817.

== Post script ==
In 1802 the British East India Company named a vessel for him, the Admiral Aplin; unfortunately a French privateer captured her in 1804 near Mauritius.
