= French frigate Psyché (1804) =

36-gun french vessel built in the late 1700s

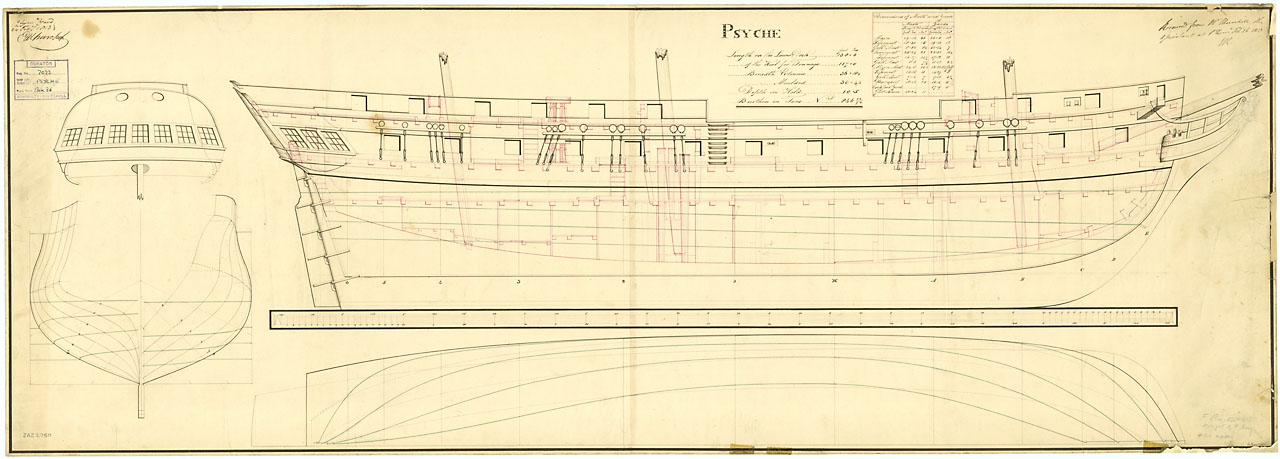
- Psyche

History

France
- Name: Psyché
- Namesake: Psyche
- Builder: Louis and Antoine Crucy, Basse-Indre yard, near Nantes (Note: Psyché was built to plans by Pierre Degay. The plans are now available at the Service Historique de la Marine in Paris, reference rf.SH320,E1.)
- Laid down: February 1798
- Launched: 1798
- In service: February 1804
- Captured: 14 February 1805

United Kingdom
- Name: Psyche
- Acquired: 14 February 1805 by capture
- Honours and awards: Naval General Service Medal with the clasp "Java"
- Fate: Broken up in 1812

General characteristics
- Displacement: 801 tonneaux
- Tons burthen: 600 port tonneaux; 846 22/94 (bm)
- Length: 138 ft 6 in (42.2 m) (gundeck); 117 ft 0 in (35.7 m) (keel)
- Beam: 36 ft 10 1/8 in (11.2 m)
- Depth: 10 ft 5 in (3.2 m)
- Sail plan: Full-rigged ship
- Complement: French service: Privateer:250, or 339; Naval service:240
- Armament: French service; Privateer: 24 × 12-pounder + 2 × 6-pounder guns + 8 × 36-pounder howitzers; Naval vessel initially: 26 × 12-pounder + 6 × 6-pounder guns + 4 × 36-pounder howitzers; Naval vessel later: 24 × 12-pounder guns + 12 × 12-pounder carronades; British service: Upper deck: 24 × 12-pounder long guns; QD: 8 × 18-pounder carronades; Fc: 2 × 6-pounder long guns (bow chasers) + 2 × 18-pounder carronades

Psyché was a 36-gun vessel built between February 1798 and 1799 at Basse-Indre (Nantes) as a privateer. As a privateer she had an inconclusive but bloody encounter with HMS Wilhelmina of the Royal Navy, commanded by Commander Henry Lambert, off the Indian coast in April 1804. The French then brought her into service in June 1804 as the frigate Psyché. In February 1805 she encountered HMS St Fiorenzo, under the command of the same Henry Lambert, now an acting captain. After a sanguinary engagement of over three hours, Psyché surrendered. The British took her into service as HMS Psyche. In British service she captured several prizes and took part in the capture of Mauritius and in an operation in Java. She was broken up at Ferrol in 1812.

== Naval service ==
Psyché was capable of sailing 13 knots in favourable conditions.

Psyché was recommissioned in the Navy in January 1801. From February to May 1801 she cruised under Lieutenant Pierre-François L'Éveillé.

On 12 April 1801, Trelawney Planter, White, master, was on her way to Suriname from London when a French frigate of 38 guns and 300 men captured her. The capture took place near Madeira and her captor sent Trelawney Planter to Tenerife.

On 2 June 1801 the brig St Sebastian, White, master, arrived at Falmouth from Madeira. She was carrying 23 ladies and gentlemen who had been passengers on board Trelawney Planter, White, master, which had been on her way to Tobago from London when the French privateer ship Psyche had captured her and landed them at Madeira.

== Merchant ==
From February 1802 to December 1802 Psyché was a merchantman under capitaine de vaisseau provisoire Jacques Bergeret, or Bonsergent. She sailed for the Indian Ocean. From July to December 1803, Psyché was under the command of Captain Trogoff.

== Privateer ==
On 1 January 1804 Psyché captured the East Indiaman Admiral Aplin, of 558 tons (bm), near Mauritius.

On 9 April 1804, while under the command of Captain Trogoff, she encountered HMS Wilhelmina, which was escorting the country ship William Petrie to Trincomalee. Psyché outgunned Wilhelmina, which was armed en flûte. She had only 21 guns: eighteen 9-pounder and two 6-pounder cannon, and one 12-pounder carronade. Psyché carried 36 cannon, a broadside that was more than double that of Wilhelmina: twenty-four 12-pounder guns, two 6-pounders and ten 18-pounder carronades. Psyché also had a crew of 250 men, compared with Wilhelmina's 124. Nevertheless, Captain Henry Lambert of Wilhelmina sailed towards Psyché to give William Petrie a chance to escape.

Light winds meant that the engagement did not begin until 11 April, when both ships opened fire, exchanging broadsides and attempting to tack around to rake their opponent. After several hours fighting, Psyché broke off and fled. Both ships had sustained heavy damage, Wilhelmina to her masts and rigging, while Psyché was reduced to a near-sinking condition. Wilhelmina had nine of her crew wounded, three mortally and six slightly, while Psyché lost ten killed and 32 wounded, 13 of them mortally. Wilhelmina put into port, while William Petrie also arrived safely at her destination.

== French naval service ==
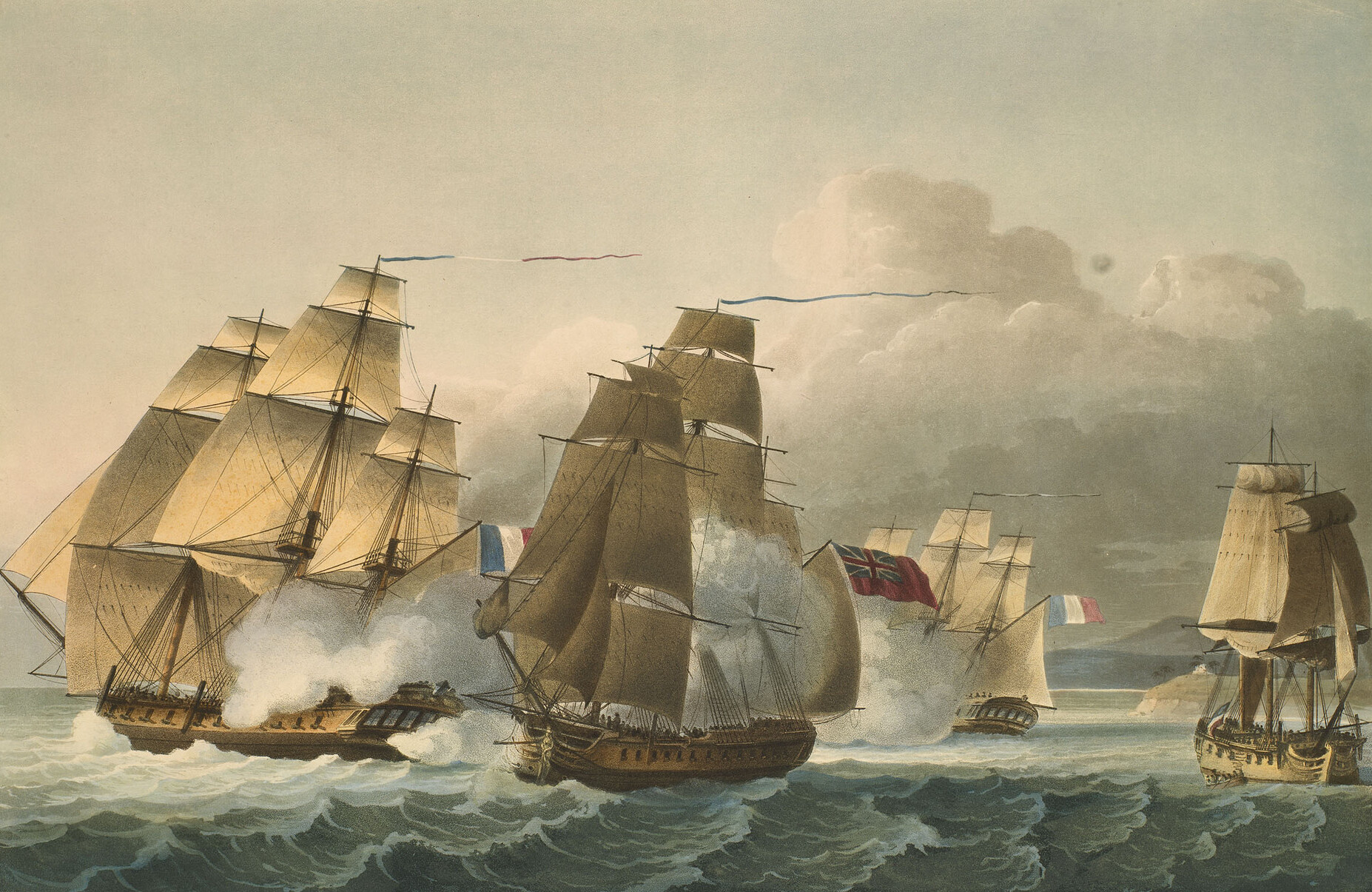
St Fiorenzo, having recaptured Thetis, tacks to engage Psyché (far left) off Vizagapatam, 13 February 1805

In June 1804 Governor Decaen purchased Psyché for the French Navy at Réunion. On 10 January 1805, under Captain Jacques Bergeret, she captured the country ship Elisa. However, the East Indiaman Indus recaptured Eliza, Waters, master; Eliza then went into Madras. On 8 January 1805 Psyché captured Gilwell as Gilwell was sailing from Bengal to Bombay. However, Psyché gave her up as Psyché did not have the crew to man Gilwell. On 14 February, Psyché captured the country ships Pigeon and Thetis. Bergeret armed Pigeon with four guns and gave her a crew of 34 men under the command of Lieutenant Ollivier.

On 14 February, Psyché, Pigeon, and Thetis encountered HMS St Fiorenzo, now under the command of Captain Henry Lambert (acting), off the Malabar Coast of India. The French abandoned Thetis as San Fiorenzo approached and Lambert put a prize crew aboard her under the command of a midshipman, and continued his pursuit. At ten minutes past eight, San Fiorenzo and Psyché started to exchange broadsides at about a cable length (720 ft (219 m)) from each other. After one hour, San Fiorenzo could hardly govern; Bergeret seized the opportunity to manoeuver and rake her, but as Psyché had lost all her carronades and several guns, her fire was ineffective.

After San Fiorenzo managed to train her guns on Psyché again, the superiority of San Fiorenzo's fire led Bergeret to attempt a boarding. At 9:45, the two frigates sailed side by side and for twenty minutes French boarding parties attempted to storm San Fiorenzo, but British small arms fire repelled them. A fire breaking out in the orlop deck of Psyché further distracted her crew from the fight. At this point, Pigeon fired four to five shots to distract San Fiorenzo, before escaping into the night. Around 11:00 or 11:30, the two frigates parted, both unmanageable, and Psyché with only two guns still operable. Both crews attempted to repair their ships and around midnight, San Fiorenzo had effected her repairs and came to re-engage the hapless and ungovernable Psyché.

Seeing the hopelessness of his position, Bergeret sent Ensign Hugon on a boat to negotiate a capitulation, offering to surrender Psyché in exchange for the British permitting his crew to keep their personal weapons and effects and to stay aboard overnight to attend to the wounded. Lambert accepted the terms and Bergeret struck his colours at midnight. Psyché had 57 killed and 70 wounded out of her crew of 240 men; San Fiorenzo had 12 killed and 36 wounded. In 1847 the Admiralty awarded the Naval General Service Medal with clasp "San Fiorenzo 14 Feby. 1805" to any still surviving claimants from the action.

== British naval service ==
Psyché entered British service as HMS Psyche, being commissioned under Commander William Woolridge in about August 1805. Under Woolridge Psyche took a number of small prizes in 1806:

- 26 March – French sloop packet ship Alexandriane, taken at sea while sailing from Île Bourbon;
- 20 May – French schooner Célestine, taken at sea while carrying a cargo of plank, corn, and cloves;
- 26 May – A French brig, (Name unknown), which Psyche ran on shore where she wrecked under the batteries of St. Gilles;
- 26 May – French lugger Uranie, taken at sea with a cargo of rice;
- 26 May – French lugger Sophie, taken at sea and burnt after her cargo of rice was removed;
- 1 June – Brig Paque Bot, taken at sea with a cargo of gum and rice;
- 2 June – French schooner Étoile, taken at sea and scuttled after her cargo of rice had been removed;
- 10 June – French brig Coquette, taken at sea with a cargo of rice;
- 10 June – French lugger Grange, taken at sea and scuttled.

Captain Fleetwood Pellew took command in 1807. His father, Rear Admiral Sir Edward Pellew, "Commander in Chief of His Majesty's Ships and Vessels in the East Indies", sent Psyche and Caroline to reconnoitre the port of Surabaya. On 30 August they captured a ship from Batavia and from her learned the disposition of the Dutch military ships in the area. Psyche proceeded to Samarang while Caroline pursued another vessel. Psyche arrived at Samarang at midnight and next morning her boats captured and brought out from under the fire of shore batteries an armed 8-gun schooner and a large merchant brig. However, Psyche had seen three more Dutch vessels, one of them a warship, and so Pellew destroyed the two captured vessels and at mid-day set out after the three other vessels.

By 3:30 on 1 September Psyche had caught up with the Dutch vessels and run them ashore. She went as close as the water depth would allow, anchored and exchanged fire with them. All three surrendered quickly. One that she captured was the 24-gun corvette Scipio, which had a crew of 150 men. Scipio was badly shot up and her commander, Captain-Lieutenant Jan Hendrik Correga, had been mortally wounded. The largest armed merchant ship was Resolutie, of 700 tons. She had a valuable cargo and as passengers the colours and staff of the Dutch 23rd European Battalion. The third vessel was the brig Ceres, of 12 guns and 70 men. Pellew had too few men to be able to deal with the prisoners so he paroled the officers to the governor of Samarang and gave up all the other men against a receipt. The British took Scipio into service under her existing name, but then renamed her Samarang.

Captain John Edgcumbe assumed command at Bombay in 1808. He then sailed Psyche to the Persian Gulf with Brigadier-General John Malcolm and his staff on an embassy to the Persian Empire. There, during the four hottest months of the year, Psyche provided protection for the British embassy at Abusheer. At the beginning of 1809, a detachment of troops from the 56th Regiment of Foot came on board Psyche to serve as marines.

Psyche returned to Bombay and then convoyed troops to Pointe de Galle. From there she went to Colombo to embark troops for Travancore to suppress a mutiny among the native troops in 1809. Psyche silenced some batteries and her boats destroyed several vessels, suffering one man wounded in the process. Later, Psyche captured two vessels transporting elephants to the mutineers.

Next, Psyche accompanied Doris to Manila in search of two French frigates, and to induce the government of the Philippines to side with Spain against France. After they returned to Prince of Wales Island, Psyche escorted their Dutch prize to Bombay.

Psyche and Doris captured in the China Sea an American ship named Rebecca. Rebecca had left Baltimore in December 1807 and arrived at Batavia on 18 May 1808. She finished unloading there on 3 June. The Dutch government chartered her to carry a cargo to take a cargo to Decuma and then return to "Souza Caya". She left Batavia on 29 April 1809 and it was on this outward bound voyage that on 29 May Psyche and Doris captured Rebecca. They brought her into Bombay where on 3 January 1810 the new Vice admiralty court condemned her for a violation of His Majesty's Order in Council of 7 January 1807, prohibiting trade between enemy ports or ports from which British ships were excluded. Her cargo of 4,000 bags of Batavian sugar and 13,710 pieces of sapan-wood were auctioned on 7 March 1810. Then on 10 March Rebecca, of 600 tons burthen, teak-built at Pegu, too was auctioned off. Rebecca's owners appealed the condemnation but lost on appeal on 18 July 1811. (Note: Rebecca may have been the vessel purchased at Calcutta that in 1800 repelled an attack by the French privateer Malartic while Rebecca was sailing from Bengal to Baltimore.)

Later in 1810 Psyche transported Brigadier-General Malcolm on a second embassy to Persia. She then sailed to the Cape of Good Hope before sailing to Rodrigues where the British were assembling a fleet to attack Isle de France (now Mauritius). On 29 November the force landed at Grand Baie; the island surrendered on 3 December. (Note: A first-class share was worth £278 19s 5 3/4d; a sixth-class share, that of an ordinary seaman, was worth £3 7s 6 1/4d. A fourth and final payment was made in July 1828. A first-class share was worth £29 19s 5 1/4d; a sixth-class share was worth 8s 2 1/2d.)

Between May and August 1811 Psyche participated in an expedition to Java under Rear Admiral Sir Robert Stopford. While there, Edgcumbe succumbed to hepatitis and had to be invalided back to Britain. Captain Robert Worgan George Festing, who had been serving on shore with the Army, received promotion to Post-captain on 9 October 1811 and assumed command of Psyche. In 1847 the Admiralty authorized the award of the Naval General Service Medal with clasp "Java" to any surviving participants that claimed it.

== Fate ==
In 1812 Festing sailed Psyche to Europe. She was in such a dilapidated state that she had to put into Ferrol to be broken up. M. Santos, the purchaser, took possession on 6 August. Her crew was repatriated to Britain on the transport Bideford.
