= Admiral Aplin (1802 EIC ship) =

British East India Company ship

History

United Kingdom
- Name: Admiral Aplin
- Namesake: Admiral Peter Aplin (1753-1817)
- Owner: Moses Agar
- Builder: Temple shipbuilders, South Shields
- Launched: 18 March 1802
- Fate: Captured 1804; possibly captured again in 1807

General characteristics
- Tons burthen: 558, or 590 (bm)
- Length: 122 ft 2 in (37.2 m) (overall), 98 ft 4 in (30.0 m) (keel)
- Beam: 32 ft 0 in (9.8 m)
- Depth of hold: 14 ft 11 in (4.5 m)
- Sail plan: Full-rigged ship
- Complement: 55
- Armament: 16 × 12-pounder guns

Admiral Aplin was an East Indiaman merchant ship of two decks, sailing under charter to the British East India Company (EIC). She made one complete voyage for the EIC before a French privateer captured her in 1804 on her second voyage. She may have returned to British ownership, only again to fall prey to a second French privateer in 1807; she subsequently foundered.

== Career ==
For Admiral Aplin's first voyage Captain John Rogers left The Downs on 20 May 1802, bound for Madras. She arrived at Madras on 25 September. On 3 January 1803 she was at St Helena, and on 31 March she arrived at Deptford.

For her second voyage Captain Rodgers left Portsmouth on 28 August 1803, bound for Ceylon, Madras, and Bengal. Because he was sailing in wartime, the Napoleonic Wars having commenced while Admiral Aplin was on her way home from her first journey, Rodgers took out a letter of marque, which she received on 20 August.

At 6:30 a.m. on 3 January 1804, Admiral Aplin sighted a strange sail. A six-day chase ensued before the French pursuer was able to catch up with her quarry. Unable to escape, Rodgers decided to fire on his pursuer in the hopes of damaging her rigging. Rodgers was forced to strike at 00°50′S 91°00′E, after an engagement of one hour. Admiral Aplin was carrying a number of passengers. One army captain was killed and another dangerously wounded. Two crewmen were also wounded. The French vessel, which turned out to be the privateer frigate Psyché, had two men dangerously wounded.

Psyché was 35 days out of Île de France (Mauritius), but had made no captures prior to encountering Admiral Aplin. (Note: There are several incorrect attributions of her captor, such as Marengo, or the privateer Robert Surcouf. He, however, may have captured her later. See below.)

The EIC put the value of its cargo lost when the French captured her at £15,240.

Danish interests purchased Admiral Aplin and renamed her La Land.

== Possible subsequent fate ==
Admiral Aplin may have returned to British ownership and resumed her original name. On 27 September 1807, the privateer Robert Surcouf, in Revenant, captured an Admiral Aplin, which was carrying 9,500 bags of rice from Bengal to Bombay. He put a prize crew on board, and sent her to Île de France.

On 15 October, Clyde picked up Admiral Aplin's crew, which Surcouf had put into her boats. The same early account attributed the capture to the French frigate Piémontaise, and also reported that Admiral Aplin had subsequently foundered.

Admiral Aplin had foundered on the Coromandel Coast on her way to Île de France. Only two men of her crew survived.

== Post-script ==
When the French captured Admiral Aplin in 1804 they also captured some 73 letters that the government published in a special edition of the official newspaper, Le Moniteur Universel.
