= HMS Falcon (1801) =

UK naval sloop and merchantman 1798–1820

History

Great Britain
- Name: Diadem
- Builder: Almon Hill & Sons, Limehouse (Note: Some accounts give her place of launch as Whitby, and her year as 1800. However that Diadem continued to be listed as a London-based transport until 1809. A different source has the government acquiring the Whitby Diadem in 1818.)
- Launched: 20 October 1798
- Fate: Purchased by the Royal Navy in 1801

United Kingdom
- Name: HMS Diadem
- Acquired: 28 February 1801
- Renamed: HMS Falcon
- Fate: Sold in 1816

United Kingdom
- Name: Duke of Wellington
- Owner: Short & Co.
- Launched: 1816 by purchase
- Fate: Wrecked at Batavia 1820

General characteristics
- Class & type: 14-gun sloop
- Tons burthen: 36628/94 or 368 bm
- Length: 102 ft 10 in (31.3 m) (overall); 80 ft 8 in (24.6 m) (keel)
- Beam: 29 ft 3 1/2 in (8.9 m)
- Sail plan: Sloop
- Complement: 75
- Armament: Gun deck: 14 × 24-pounder carronades; QD: 2 × 18-pounder carronades

Diadem was a sloop launched in 1798. The Admiralty renamed her HMS Falcon after purchasing her in 1801 to avoid confusion with the pre-existing third rate Diadem. Falcon served in the north Atlantic and the Channel, and then in Danish waters during the Gunboat War. She was sold in 1816. Her new owner renamed her Duke of Wellington and sailed her to the Indies under a license from the British East India Company. She was wrecked in 1820 at Batavia.

== HMS ==
=== 1801 to 1806 ===
Commander James Nash commissioned Falcon in February 1801. On 14 August she escorted the East Indiaman Indian Chief from St Helena back to the United Kingdom.

Commander James Nash's replacement, in 1802, was Commander Henry M. Ommaney, who sailed her to Newfoundland.

Near Newfoundland, Falcon captured two prizes – Caroline on 17 July 1803, and on 28 July the apparently British-built Mercure.

Commander George Sanders took over command in Newfoundland February 1804. Early in 1804 Falcon was refitting in Plymouth, before going on to serve in the Channel, where she engaged shore batteries at Le Havre. Falcon was also awarded prize money for the recapture, on 3 November, of the sloop John and Thomas.

Falcon then operated in the North Sea. On 10 June 1805, Falcon, with Chiffonne, Clinker, and Frances chased a French convoy for nine hours until the convoy took shelter under the guns of Fécamp. The convoy consisted of two corvettes (Foudre under capitaine de vaisseau Jacques-Felix-Emmanuel Hemelin, and Audacieuse, under Lieutenant Dominique Roquebert), four large gunvessels and eight others, and 14 transports. The British suffered some casualties from gunfire from shore batteries, with Falcon suffering four men wounded and some damage to her rigging. In company with Chiffonne, Steady, and the hired armed cutter Frances, Falcon was involved in the capture of Zeeluft on 20 June 1805, and also shared in prize money from the cargoes of another two vessels captured that year.

=== 1807: Danzig and Copenhagen ===
At the ultimately unsuccessful British defence of Danzig in April 1807, Falcon was involved in bringing reinforcements and the Russian General Nikolay Kamensky to the area. Volunteers from Falcon went on board the hired armed ship Sally, which then entered the relatively shallow waters at the mouth of the Vistula to take the battle to the French.

On 28 August 1807, in company with the sloop Vulture, Falcon captured the Danish ship Martha for which prize money was awarded nearly four years later.

On 7 September, Falcon was one of the 126 ships officially listed as being at the surrender at Copenhagen. She later shared in the prize money allotted for the capture of the Danish fleet. (Note: Falcon's captain, George Sanders, went on to command Belette the following year.)

=== 1808: Zealand Point, Endelave and Tunø ===
Commander George A. Creyke took command in 1808. On 22 March 1808 Falcon was among the smaller British warships at the battle of Zealand Point. She watched from a safe distance and recorded the course of the battle in her logbook.

In late April, under orders from Captain Donald Campbell of the third rate Dictator, Lieutenant John Price, acting captain of Falcon, took her northward to the west of Samsø to search for enemy boats capable of carrying troops from mainland Jutland to Zealand or Skåne. Falcon destroyed eight "pretty large boats .. with troops nearby" on the island of Endelave, six boats on Tunø on 29 April, and 13 others in the waters between Samsø and Aarhus, all before 15 May. (Note: Danish sources describe in considerable detail Falcon's general activities during May and June. On Tunø Lieutenant Price required the islanders to allow the sloop to replenish her water supplies and to sell her livestock as provisions. On Endelave in June, no payments were made for any of the livestock taken because of a token resistance put up by the islanders.)

The Danes were fortifying the harbour complex to the east of Samsø, with its outlying islands of Kyholm and Lindholm. During the night of 7 May, Falcon sent in a cutting-out party in her boats. The British captured two boats each loaded with thirteen-inch mortars and associated equipment, including 400 mortar shells. Lieutenant Price recorded that one of these boats ran aground and had to be burned; he destroyed the other boat after removing the mortar.

On 3 June Falcon sent in her boats to make a further raid on Endelave.

=== Disposal ===
In 1810 Falcon was at Sheerness, where she was fitted as a military depot and hospital ship. From 1812 on Falcon was in ordinary. On 14 May 1816 the Navy Office invited tenders for the purchase of numerous ships, including "lying at Sheerness,... Falcon sloop, of 368 tons". She was sold there, for £800, on 31 July.

== Duke of Wellington ==
Short & Co. purchased Diadem in 1816 and renamed her Duke of Wellington. She appears in Lloyd's Register (LR)) at London with Woodcock, master, and Short, owner. Her place of launch is "River", i.e., the Thames, and her year of launch is 1798. She appears in Lloyd's Register of 1818 among the vessels that the British East India Company had licensed to trade with the Indies. The list shows her with Howard, master, and having sailed for Bombay on 17 November 1817. Both Lloyd's Register and the Register of Shipping (RS) show her master as J. Howard, but LR shows her trade as London—Rio de Janeiro, while the Register shows it as London—Botany Bay. This discrepancy continues in the 1819, 1820, and 1821 volumes of both publications. Duke of Wellington is no longer listed in the 1822 volume of Lloyd's; she does not leave the Register until the 1824 volume.

== Fate ==
Lloyd's List reported on 11 August 1820 that Duke of Wellington, formerly Stout, master, had been driven ashore at Batavia by a gale in early February 1820, and that accounts from 31 March were that she was to be sold there. On 2 June 1820 Duke of Wellington was sold at a public auction for 8,000 rupees for breaking up. The proceeds of the auction were for the account of the European Orphan Chamber.

== Further Information and Background Reading ==
- Tim Voelcker: Admiral Saumarez versus Napoleon - The Baltic 1807 - 1812 : Boydell Press
