= Indian Chief (1798 ship) =

Indian Chief, of 402 tons (bm), was built at Calcutta in 1798. She was captured and sold to the Americans. She made one voyage to Bengal for the British East India Company (EIC). She was last listed in the Register of Shipping in 1810.

Indian Chief left New York on 21 April 1800 and was at Hamburg on 13 June. By 22 August she was at Yarmouth. The sloop HMS Inspector had detained Indian Chief, Service, master, as she was sailing from Hamburg to Bengal. The government seized seven bales of linen. Inspector shared the prize money with the hired armed cutter Diligent. (Note: Prize money for some bales of linen on Indian Chief, net of costs for the detained neutral vessels, amounted to £4 11s 9d for a petty officer and £1 11s 6d for a seaman.)

EIC voyage: Indian Chief left Portsmouth on 2 December, was at Madeira on 15 December, and arrived at Calcutta on 2 April 1801. Bound for Britain, she was at Culpee on 16 May and reached St Helena on 12 August. Indian Chief, Service, master, sailed for London on 14 August. She sailed under escort by the sloop Falcon. Indian Chief arrived at the Downs on 22 September 1801.

On 25 or 26 September, Indian Chief was approached by a frigate flying French colours. As the frigate came close enough to board, Service threw overboard all the EIC confidential mails and packets that he was carrying. The frigate only hauled up British colours after the mails had been jettisoned. A boarding party checked Indian Chief's papers and then left.

Indian Chief was carrying a cargo of rice from Bengal. She is not listed among the vessels participating in the British Government program in 1801–1802, to import rice from Bengal, but may have been responding to the need. She reported that when she had left Bengal most of the rice ships were preparing to sail for London and that there was plenty of grain available there.

Indian Chief arrived at Gravesend, Kent on 30 September. Her cargo consisted of 4150 bags of rice, 1800 bags of pepper, 98 bales of piece goods, 46 tons of indigo, and six pipes of wine.

Year	Master	Owner	Trade	Source
1801	R.Service	Thompson	London–Jamaica	Register of Shipping (RS)
1802	R.Service; W.Harrington	Thompson	London–Jamaica; London–Lisbon	RS

On 5 April 1802 Indian Chief, Harrington, master, arrived at Oporto from London.

Year	Master	Owner	Trade	Source
1804	Harrington	Norman	London–Lisbon	RS
1810	Harrington	Norman	London–Lisbon	RS
