= Samuel Sutton =

Royal Navy officer (1760–1832)

Rear-Admiral Samuel Sutton
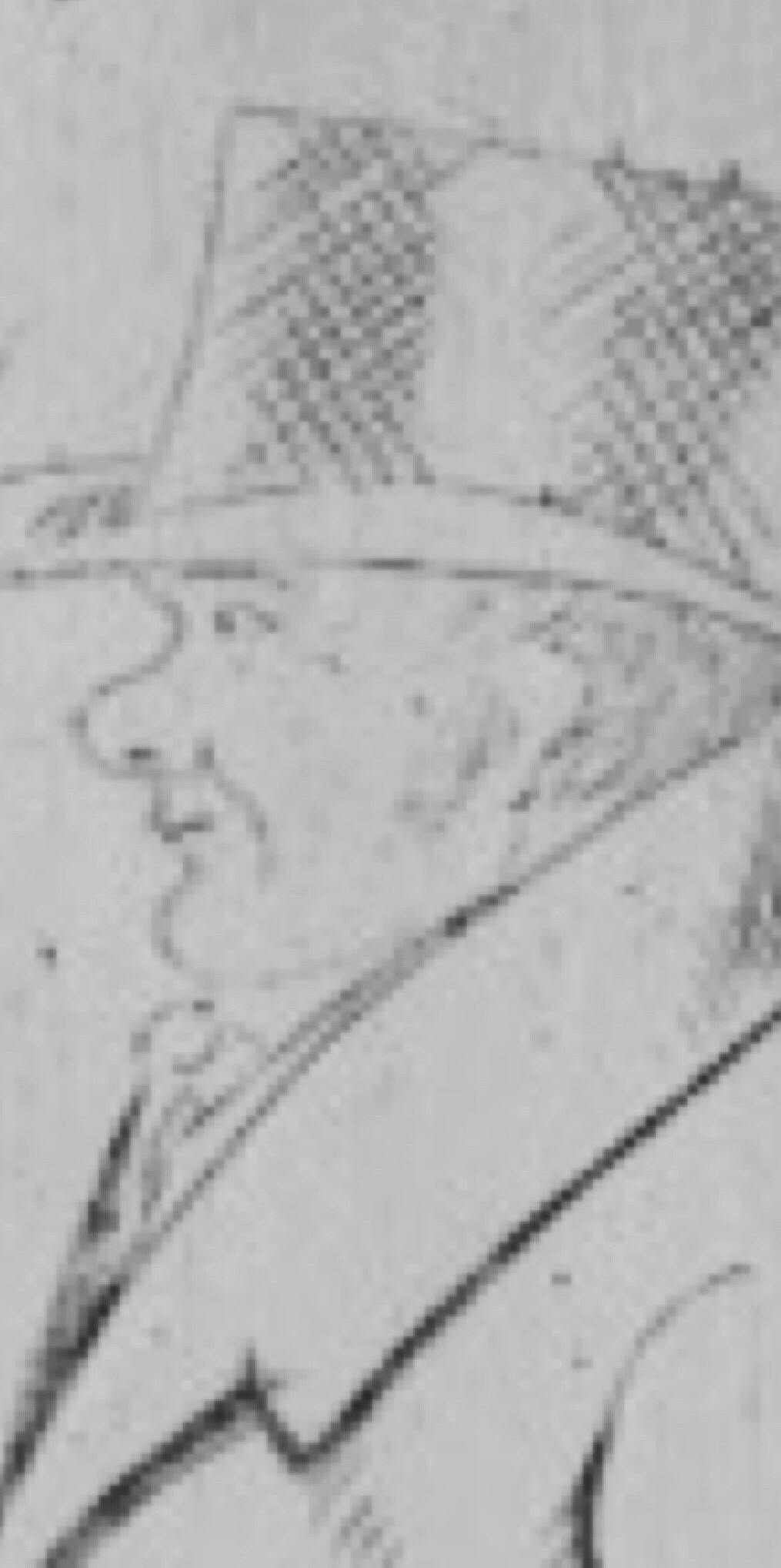
- Born: 1760; Scarborough, North Yorkshire
- Died: June 1832 (aged 71–72); Ditchingham, Norfolk
- Military career
- Allegiance: Kingdom of Great Britain; United Kingdom of Great Britain and Ireland
- Branch: Royal Navy
- Service years: 1777 – 1832
- Rank: Rear-Admiral
- Commands: HMS Martin; HMS Monarch; HMS Prince; HMS Alcmene; HMS Amazon; HMS Victory; HMS Amphion
- Conflicts: American Revolutionary War; Battle of Grenada; Battle of Martinique; French Revolutionary Wars; Cornwallis's Retreat; Napoleonic Wars; First Battle of Copenhagen; Action of 5 October 1804; Trafalgar campaign

Samuel Sutton (1760 – June 1832) was an officer in the Royal Navy. He entered the service shortly after the start of the American War of Independence, and spent most of his early career serving with Captain and later Admiral Joshua Rowley. He saw action at several engagements with the French fleets in the West Indies, and ended the war as a lieutenant. Left without active employment by the following years of peace, Sutton briefly returned to service during the Spanish Armament in 1790, but the outbreak of the French Revolutionary Wars in 1793 brought him steady work. After serving on a number of ships and being present at Cornwallis's Retreat in 1795, Sutton received command of a sloop, and with it the opportunity to render a service to a member of the French aristocracy, and the future Charles X of France. Promoted for his good service, Sutton served as a flag captain to several admirals, including Horatio Nelson. He briefly commanded HMS Victory, before surrendering her to Thomas Hardy, who would go on to command Victory at Trafalgar, and be present at Nelson's death. Sutton instead took command of a frigate, and in 1804 was involved in a controversial action that saw the capture of three Spanish frigates and the destruction of a fourth. Made wealthy from the spoils, Sutton nevertheless remained in the navy, taking part in the chase of the French fleet to the West Indies in 1805. His health declined during this period, and he went ashore in October that year. He retired from active service, and served as a magistrate and local official for his community, being promoted to rear-admiral in 1821 and dying in 1832.

== Early life ==
Sutton was born in 1760 in Scarborough, North Yorkshire, and entered the navy on 9 April 1777 as an able seaman and later a midshipman aboard the 74-gun HMS Monarch, which was under the command of Captain Joshua Rowley. Sutton and Rowley served in the English Channel until Rowley's promotion to rear-admiral in December 1778 and his shifting his flag to the 74-gun HMS Suffolk, with Hugh Cloberry Christian as his flag captain. Sutton accompanied Rowley to the Suffolk, and moved with him again when Rowley raised his flag aboard Captain Thomas Watson's 74-gun HMS Conqueror in December 1779. During this time Sutton saw action at the Battle of Grenada on 6 July 1779, and the Battle of Martinique on 17 April 1780.

Sutton was with Rowley on his next two flagships, the 74-gun HMS Terrible from June 1780 and the 98-gun HMS Princess Royal from July, both times serving under Captain John Thomas Duckworth. Sutton became an acting-lieutenant while on board Princess Royal, retaining the position after being transferred to the 16-gun sloop HMS Jamaica under Captain Manley Dixon. He was next aboard the 18-gun ex-French HMS Duguay Trouin under commander Benjamin Hulke from December, though in May 1782 he returned to Rowley when he joined him aboard his flagship, the 90-gun HMS London under Captain James Kempthorn. He stayed at Rowley's side when the admiral moved to the 74-gun HMS Ajax under Captain N. Chasington in December, and then the 50-gun HMS Preston under Captain George Martin in March 1783.

He was confirmed as lieutenant on 21 April 1783, despite never having formally been examined, but was in poor health and had to return to Britain aboard the 14-gun brig-sloop HMS Childers. He recovered and received an appointment in March 1785 to the sloop HMS Merlin, under Commander Edward Pakenham, with whom he went out to Newfoundland for the rest of the year. The end of the war left Sutton without a ship, and he spent four and a half years ashore after leaving Merlin.

== Return to service ==
The Spanish Armament in 1790 led to the Admiralty ordering the manning and storing of a large number of ships in preparation for war. Sutton was posted to the 32-gun frigate HMS Iphigenia on 22 June 1790 as signal officer to Captain Patrick Sinclair, and served for a while with Lord Howe's fleet. The easing of tensions after the crisis passed led to a draw-down in the navy, and Sutton came ashore again on 7 February 1791. The tensions leading up to the outbreak of the French Revolutionary Wars provided another opportunity for employment, and Sutton joined the 74-gun HMS Culloden on 3 January, which was serving in the Channel as the flagship of Sir Thomas Rich. Sutton transferred to the 74-gun HMS Mars under Captain Sir Charles Cotton in November 1794, and in June 1795 was involved in Admiral William Cornwallis's successful retreat from a superior French force led by Louis Thomas Villaret de Joyeuse. The Mars as the rear-most ship bore the brunt of the French fire, but suffered only 12 wounded. Cornwallis brought his fleet about to rescue Cotton, causing Villaret de Joyeuse to believe that Cornwallis had reinforcements nearby, and so broke off the pursuit.

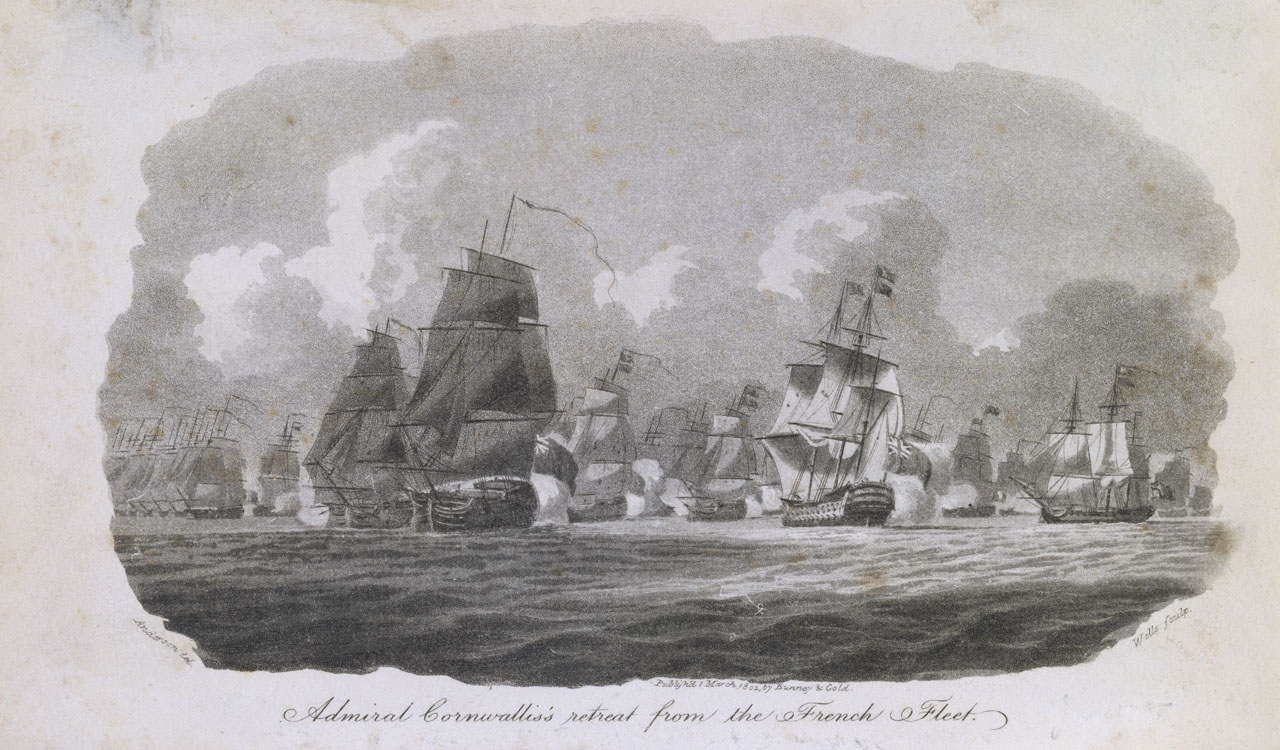
Cornwallis's Retreat. Sutton's ship, HMS Mars, bore the brunt of the French fire.

Sutton was promoted to commander on 1 September 1795 and was given the 16-gun sloop HMS Martin for service off West Africa and in the North Sea. While in the North Sea in 1797 his duties included transporting the Duc d'Angoulême, the future Charles X of France from Leith to Cuxhaven. His good service brought him a quick promotion to post-captain, on 27 June 1797, but left him without a ship for over a year. He returned to sea on 3 September 1798 as flag captain to Sir Richard Onslow aboard the 74-gun HMS Monarch, the ship he had entered the service on twenty-one years earlier as an able seaman under Rowley. Sutton was transferred to the 90-gun HMS Prince on 13 March 1799, becoming flag captain to his old commander, now rear-admiral, Sir Charles Cotton. He remained with Prince until being transferred to the 32-gun HMS Alcmene on 23 February 1801.

== Copenhagen and Nelson ==
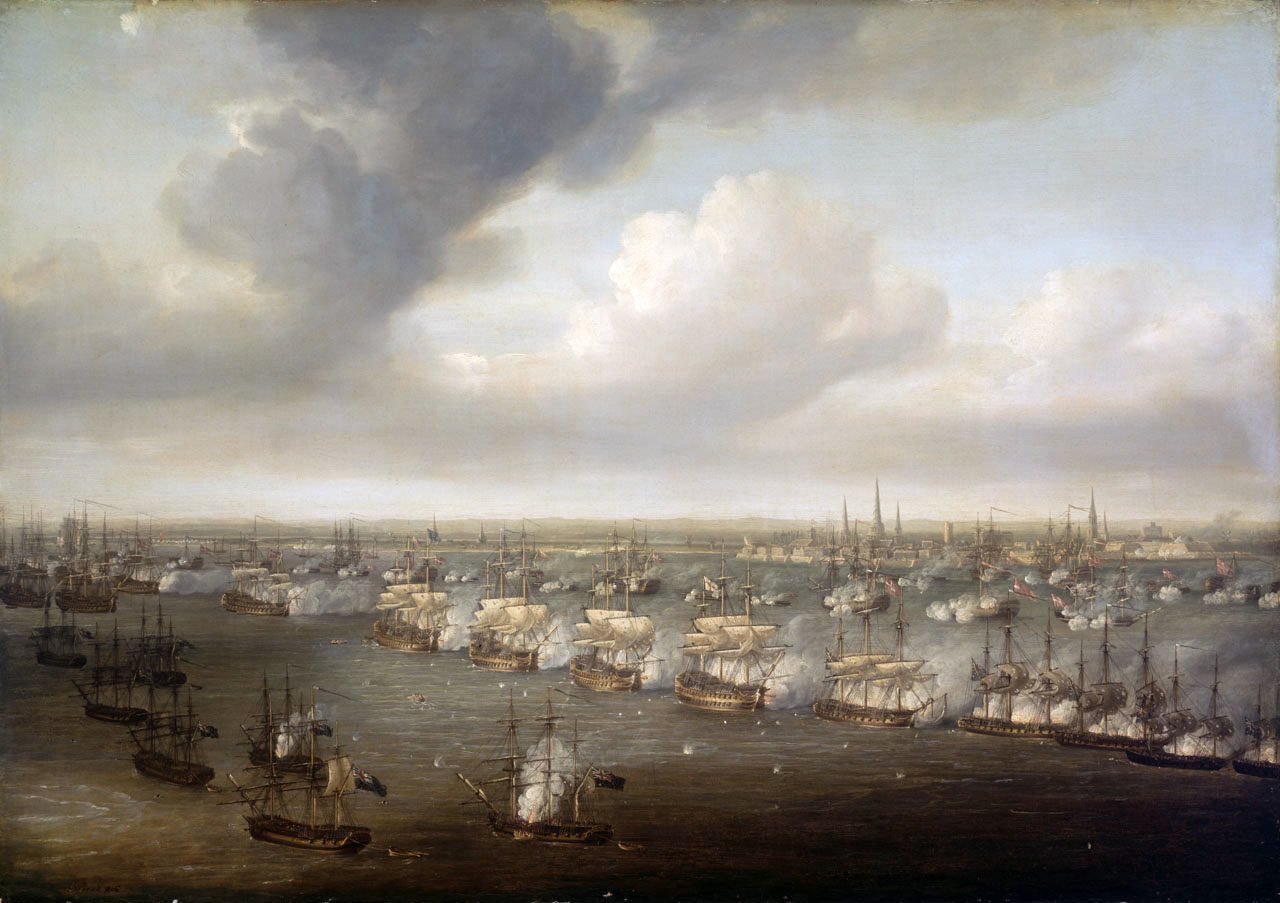
The Battle of Copenhagen, by Nicholas Pocock. The frigates were heavily engaged during the fighting.

Alcmene was one of the ships assigned to Admiral Sir Hyde Parker's expeditionary force to the Baltic in 1801. Sutton commanded her as part of Rear-Admiral Horatio Nelson's force at the Battle of Copenhagen. The frigates engaged the Trekroner fortress during the battle, before obeying Parker's signal to withdraw, an order Nelson ignored. After the battle Nelson appointed Sutton to command the 38-gun HMS Amazon, whose captain, Edward Riou, had been killed in the battle. Sutton remained serving in the Baltic as Nelson's flag captain, returning him to Britain and continuing to serve under him during Nelson's period in charge of the anti-invasion defences. Nelson went ashore in October 1802, after which Sutton took Rear-Admiral John Borlase Warren to St Petersburg.

== HMS Victory ==
Sutton stepped down from the command of Amazon in November 1802, and by early 1803 had been assigned to take over the command of the 100-gun first rate HMS Victory. Nelson arrived at Portsmouth on 18 May and hoisted his flag aboard her, but Victory had been assigned to Admiral William Cornwallis in the Channel, and was not ready for sea. Nelson struck his flag two days later, and immediately took passage for the Mediterranean aboard Thomas Hardy's HMS Amphion, leaving Sutton to finish preparing Victory and deliver her to Cornwallis. Nelson left orders that if Cornwallis did not want her for his flagship, Sutton was to proceed onwards to join him in the Mediterranean. Sutton joined Cornwallis off Ushant, whereupon Cornwallis ordered him on to Nelson. Sutton and the Victory sailed to rendezvous with Nelson off Cape Sicie, and while doing so, came across the French frigate Embuscade on 28 May as the latter was entering the Bay of Biscay after a journey from the West Indies. Embuscade, a former British ship, attempted to escape, but could not outrun the newly refitted Victory and was forced to surrender without a shot being fired. Sutton took possession of her, and then continued on his way, joining the Mediterranean Fleet in late July, whereupon Nelson hoisted his flag on her. He brought Hardy with him as his flag captain, while Sutton took command of Hardy's former ship, Amphion.

== Mediterranean ==
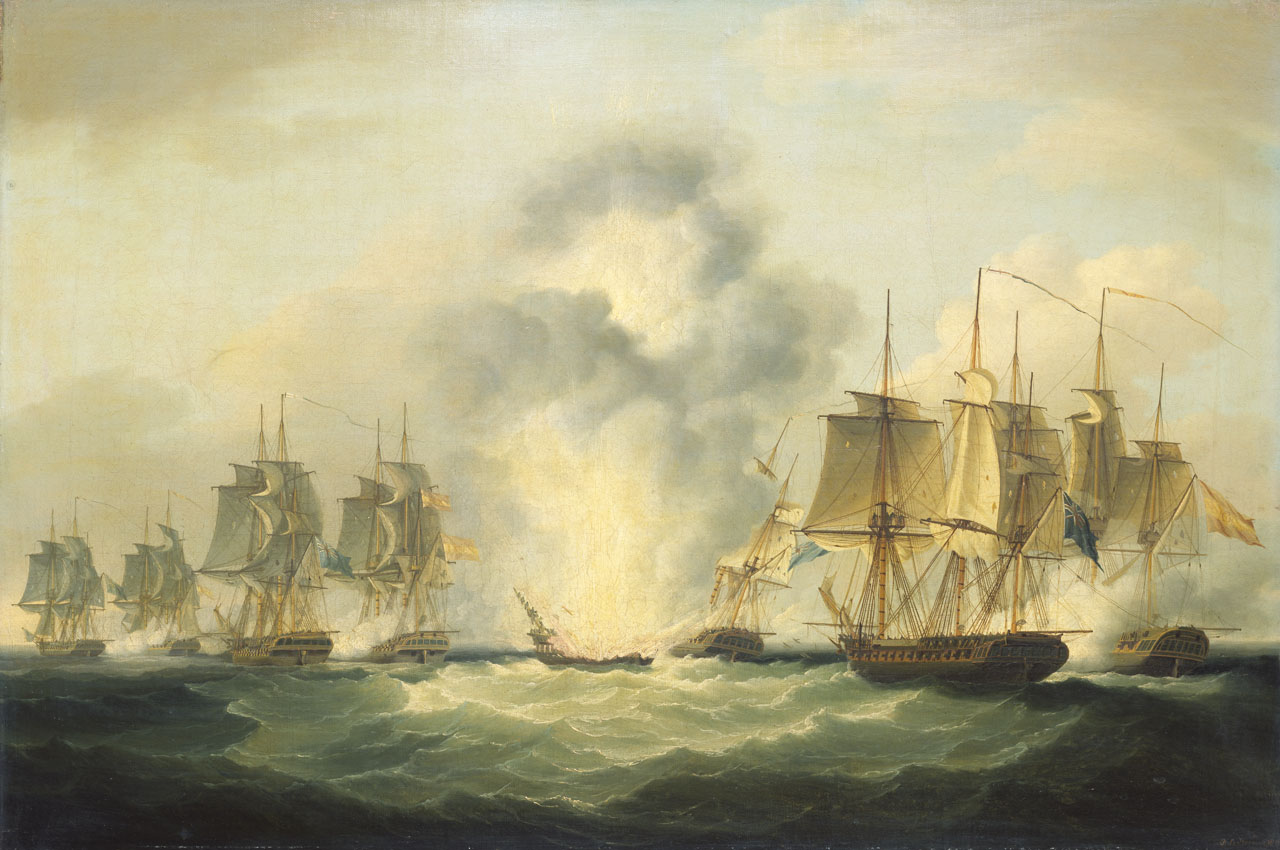
Four frigates capturing Spanish treasure ships (5 October 1804) by Francis Sartorius. The Mercedes is shown exploding, while alongside is Sutton's Amphion.

Sutton remained in the Mediterranean with Nelson's fleet, initially patrolling off Toulon, before transferring to Cádiz. On 3 October 1804 Amphion was one of four frigates sent to intercept four Spanish frigates approaching Cádiz with a large cargo of specie. The British ships, consisting of Amphion, HMS Indefatigable, HMS Lively and HMS Medusa, sighted the Spanish early on the morning of 5 October, and gave chase. The Spanish were hailed, but refused to surrender to the British, and fighting broke out. After a short but fierce action, one Spanish ship blew up and the other three struck their colours. The Amphion had three wounded in the action. The treasure recovered from the three surviving ships was valued at £1,000,000, but its seizure contributed to the Spanish decision to ally with France and declare war on Britain.

== West Indies, retirement, and later life ==
Sutton and the Amphion remained with Nelson's fleet into 1805, and took part in the Trafalgar Campaign, chasing Villeneuve's forces to the West Indies and back. Sutton was in poor health by the time the fleet returned to anchor off Lisbon in October, and Nelson sent Sutton ashore to recuperate, replacing him with William Hoste as commander of Amphion. Sutton was rich from the prize money of the captured Spanish ships, and appears to have retired ashore, never serving at sea again. He served as a magistrate and a deputy lieutenant for the counties of Norfolk and Suffolk, and was promoted to rear-admiral on 19 July 1821. Samuel Sutton died at Ditchingham, Norfolk in June 1832 at the age of 72.
