= Sir Richard King, 2nd Baronet =

Vice-Admiral Sir Richard King Bt KCB
- Born: 28 November 1774; Maypowder, Dorset, England
- Died: 5 August 1834 (aged 59); Sheerness, Kent, England
- Burial place: All Saints Church, Eastchurch, Isle of Sheppey, England
- Military career
- Allegiance: United Kingdom
- Branch: Royal Navy
- Rank: Vice-Admiral
- Commands: HMS Sirius; HMS Achille; East Indies Station; Nore Command
- Conflicts: French Revolutionary Wars; Napoleonic Wars
- Awards: Knight Commander of the Order of the Bath

Vice-Admiral Sir Richard King, 2nd Baronet, KCB (28 November 1774 – 5 August 1834) was an officer in the Royal Navy during the French Revolutionary and Napoleonic Wars, who fought with distinction at the battle of Trafalgar despite being amongst the youngest captains present.

== Naval career ==
King was the son of Sir Richard King, 1st Baronet, a wealthy and high-ranking member of the Navy. King was placed on board ship at fourteen, thanks to the influence of his father and made Post Captain just six years later, an achievement made possible by his father's rank of admiral. Normally an officer would be waiting double or triple that time before gaining such a prestigious rank. Nonetheless, King was no incompetent, and proved his worth as captain of HMS Sirius, capturing four enemy privateers whilst in command, as well as sitting on the navy board which condemned Richard Parker to death for his part in the Nore mutiny in 1797. At the action of 24 October 1798, King captured two Batavian Navy ships. In 1801 he captured a French frigate, and was rewarded with command of the large 74 gun ship of the line HMS Achille.

A month before the battle of Trafalgar, sensing that there was glory to be won in the coming operations off Cádiz, King used his influence with his father in law, Admiral Sir John Duckworth, to persuade Nelson to give him a position in the blockading fleet. Since his reputation was good, Nelson endorsed the move and King joined just in time to catch the combined fleet off Trafalgar on 21 October 1805. The seventh ship in Collingwood's division, Achille was heavily engaged, chasing off the Spanish Montañés and the battling alongside HMS Belleisle with the Argonauta. Whilst chasing this ship through the melee, Achille was cut off by her namesake, the French Achille, with whom she began a savage cannonade until joined by the French ship Berwick, whom Achille turned her attention on. An hour of savage fighting forced the French craft to eventually surrender, but at the cost of 13 dead and 59 wounded, severe losses in comparison with most of the British fleet.

King was, along with the other captains, voted many honours following the battle, and unlike several of his compatriots retained his command at sea, being engaged the following year in the action against a French frigate squadron in an action in which Sir Samuel Hood lost an arm. The same year he inherited his father's baronetcy and transferred to the Mediterranean, where in 1812 he made the jump to Rear-Admiral and second in command to Edward Pellew. He was appointed KCB on 2 January 1815 and served as commander-in-chief on the East Indies Station from 1816.

Continuing in service postwar in 1819 as a Vice-Admiral and Knight Commander of the Order of the Bath, King served as commander in chief in the East Indies. As Commander-in-Chief, The Nore from 1833 King continued his successful career past the age at which many of his contemporaries retired.

He died in office in 1834 whilst at Sheerness from a sudden outbreak of cholera. He was buried nearby, survived by twelve children and his second wife.

== Private life ==
King's first wife was Sarah Anne Duckworth, daughter of Admiral Sir John Duckworth, 1st Baronet, GCB. They had 4 sons and a daughter. The sons included his first son and heir Sir Richard Duckworth King, 3rd Baronet and his second son vice-admiral Sir George St Vincent King (later Duckworth-King), who succeeded his elder brother as 4th baronet.

His second wife was Maria Susannah, the daughter of Admiral Sir Charles Cotton, 5th Baronet, with whom he had a further 4 sons and 3 daughters.

Military offices
Preceded by George Sayer	Commander-in-Chief, East Indies Station; 1816–1820	Succeeded by Henry Blackwood
Preceded by Sir John Beresford	Commander-in-Chief, The Nore; 1833–1834	Succeeded by Charles Elphinstone Fleeming
Baronetage of Great Britain
Preceded by Richard King	Baronet (of Bellevue); 1806–1834	Succeeded by Richard Duckworth King
