= The Fortune of War =

1979 novel by Patrick O'Brian

- First edition
- Author: Patrick O'Brian
- Language: English
- Series: Aubrey–Maturin series
- Genre: Historical novel
- Publisher: Collins (UK)
- Publication date: 1979
- Publication place: United Kingdom
- Media type: Print (Hardback & Paperback)
- Pages: 280
- ISBN: 0-00-222498-4
- OCLC: 5658117
- Dewey Decimal: 823/.9/14
- LC Class: PZ3.O1285 Fo PR6029.B55
- Preceded by: Desolation Island
- Followed by: The Surgeon's Mate

The Fortune of War is the sixth historical novel in the Aubrey–Maturin series by British author Patrick O'Brian, first published in 1979. It is set during the War of 1812 and much of the story takes place in Boston, Massachusetts.

HMS Leopard has made its way to Botany Bay, left its prisoners, and sailed to Pulo Batang, where the ship is declared unfit for war. Captain Aubrey and some of his followers are put aboard the packet ship La Flèche to sail home for a new commission, but a shipboard fire ends the months of sweet sailing and brings them into the new war.

The Fortune of War contains lightly fictionalized accounts of two actual sea battles in the War of 1812.

== Plot summary ==
HMS Leopard, her rudder now remounted, sails from Desolation Island to Port Jackson, New South Wales, where she drops off her few prisoners. Captain Bligh has already been handled, so she proceeds to the Dutch East Indies station and Admiral Drury at Pulo Batang. Drury relates that Jack Aubrey and his Leopards have been feared dead since the arrival of Grant's party at Cape Town. The badly damaged Leopard is declared unfit for guns due to wood rot and is destined to serve as a troop transport. Jack and several of his followers, including Stephen Maturin, are given passage aboard the courier ship La Flèche in order to travel to England, where Jack's next command, Acasta, awaits him. The rest of the crew is left with Admiral Drury. Stephen learns from Wallis the overwhelming success of his scheme to damage French intelligence sources, and relays the name of a probable spy in the Royal Navy who had been mentioned by Louisa Wogan. Jack and Stephen join a game of cricket, but it ends abruptly with the arrival of Captain Yorke and La Flèche, which also brings mail to them. Yorke had visited Sophia Aubrey before leaving England, bringing Jack a personal letter and gifts from her. Jack is moved upon hearing of his wife's refusal to believe the rumors of his death.

At Simon's Town, La Flèche learns that war has at last been declared between Britain and America. The war has opened with the defeat of two Royal Navy vessels in battles against the fledgling American Navy, which disheartens the sailors. In spite of the depressed atmosphere Jack spends this time of sweet sailing teaching the young midshipmen, while Stephen is engrossed in salvaging the numerous specimens he has collected from Desolation Island and New Holland alongside McLean, the ship's Scottish surgeon, though he is concerned by McLean's habitual smoking around the jars of preservative alcohol. One night in the Atlantic near Brazil a fire breaks out on board La Flèche and all abandon ship to the small boats. The survivors drift through tropical seas for a few hot weeks, some dying of thirst and exposure, before the boat carrying Aubrey and Maturin is rescued on Christmas Eve by HMS Java, headed for Bombay and commanded by Captain Henry Lambert.

The watch sees a ship hull-up on the horizon, USS Constitution, which Java immediately pursues. Jack and others from Leopard man two guns but the fight goes badly when Java's foremast gives way. The American commander makes few mistakes and soon Java strikes its colours, yet another major defeat for the Royal Navy. Constitution takes prisoners, sets fire to Java, and returns to Boston to refit. Captain Lambert is mortally wounded and Jack has been shot in his right arm and is too ill to be put ashore, so Stephen stays with his patient aboard Constitution. All of Stephen's collections, except what he noted in his diary by words or drawings, are lost. During the voyage Stephen talks with a French passenger, Pontet-Canet, and works beside the ship's surgeon, Dr Evans.

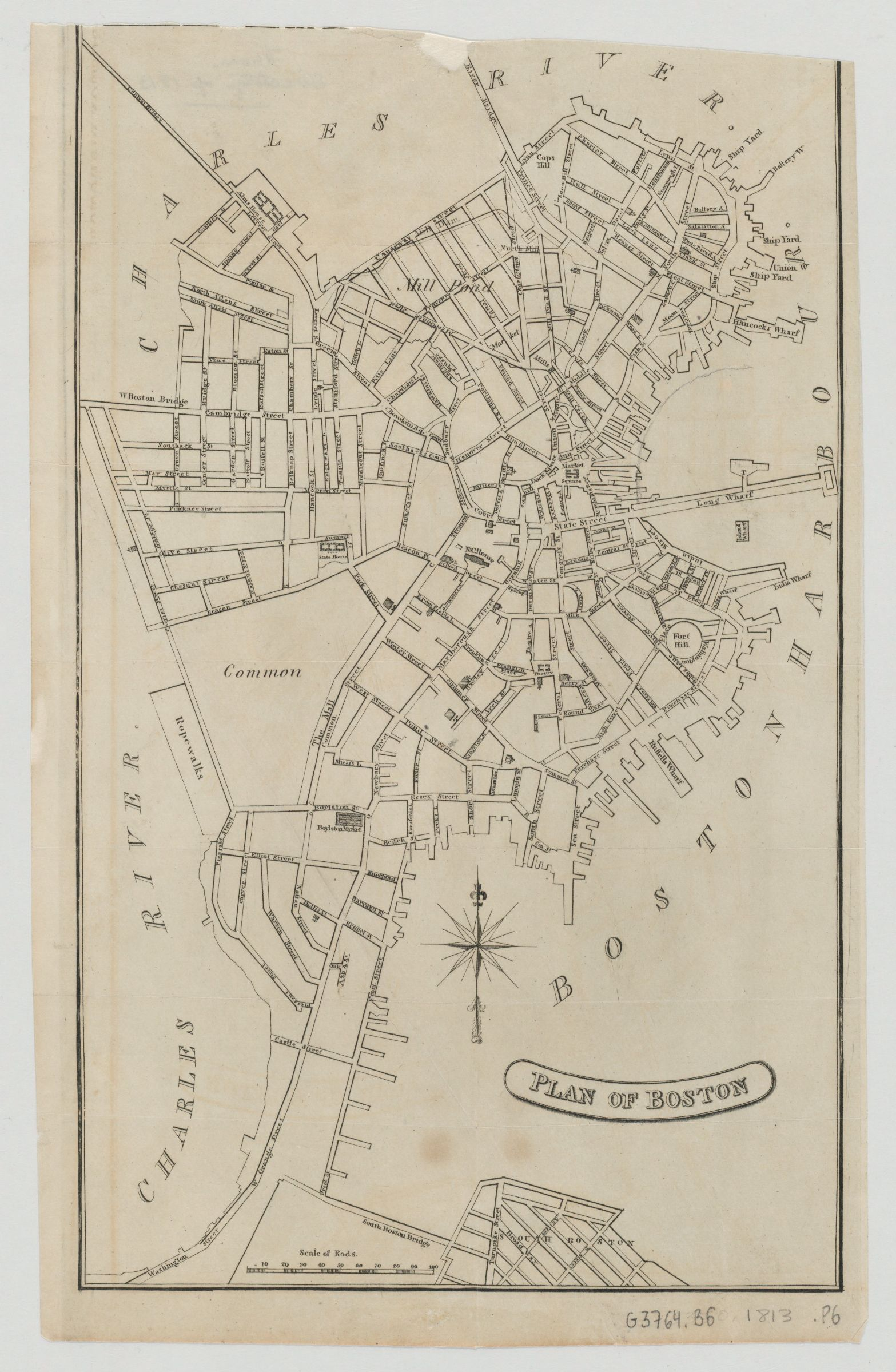
Much of the action of this novel takes place in Boston, Massachusetts, United States, during the War of 1812.

By the time they reach Boston, Jack is severely weakened by pneumonia. Stephen requests that Jack be allowed to convalesce ashore in Dr Choate's hospital, the Asclepia, while waiting for the next prisoner exchange. Jack is questioned in his sickbed by an officer of the US Navy Department, but Jack puts him off, realizing now why his exchange is taking so long: the Americans and their French allies suspect Jack is the agent responsible for Stephen's acts of espionage, among other war crimes. Stephen is reacquainted with Louisa Wogan and Michael Herapath (both still apparently ignorant of his espionage) and then meets their newborn daughter Caroline and Michael's father. George Herapath is a wealthy merchant and Loyalist whose trade with China has been interrupted by the present war, as a British fleet is blockading Boston harbour. He and Jack quickly take a liking to each other. Stephen also finally encounters his former love interest Diana Villiers, still the mistress of Harry Johnson, a wealthy American slave owner from Maryland who is active as a spy for his nation. Johnson visits Aubrey in hospital, who makes a comment about Stephen that reveals too much to the bluff spy. Stephen suddenly suspects that Johnson and the French agents, Pontet-Canet and Jean Dubreuil, have turned their attention away from Jack and towards himself. He asks George Herapath to bring Jack a pair of pistols.

Jack continually watches the harbour from his room in the Asclepia. Pontet-Canet tries and fails twice to abduct Stephen in the streets of Boston. After the second attempt, during which he is nearly shot, Stephen is concealed by Diana in the Franchon Hotel while Johnson is away with Wogan. While Stephen searches Johnson's hotel room, Pontet-Canet enters and Stephen clubs him from behind and slits his throat with a lancet, killing him, then shoots Dubreuil with a pistol when he too comes looking for Johnson. Stephen discovers that Johnson had intercepted a letter to him from Diana, and realizes he is now aware of their relationship: Diana wants away from Johnson, and Stephen offers to marry her to solve her problems of citizenship, to which Diana agrees.

With the French agents' disappearance not likely to remain unnoticed for long, Stephen sends a note to Jack explaining his predicament and detailing a plan of escape that night. Jack beseeches the help of George Herapath, and together they quietly rescue Stephen and Diana from the hotel and hide them in one of Herapath's merchant ships. Eager to escape to the British blockade before dawn, Jack steals a small fishing boat and sails out on the ebb tide with Stephen and Diana aboard. They soon meet the 38-gun frigate HMS Shannon as she enters the outer harbour on blockade duty, and are taken on board by Captain Philip Broke, Aubrey's cousin and childhood friend. Diana becomes catatonic with seasickness. Broke writes a challenge to Captain James Lawrence, the new commander of the 38-gun USS Chesapeake lying in harbour, to engage the Shannon in one-on-one combat, which alas never reaches him. Chesapeake nevertheless comes out in apparent pursuit of Aubrey, whose escape the Americans have now discovered, and engages Shannon. The battle lasts fifteen minutes, with Jack leading a gun crew, his wounded right arm bandaged to his body, while Diana recovers in the forepeak and Stephen waits below with the surgeon. Captain Broke is wounded, but Chesapeake ultimately strikes her colours to Shannon, the first significant British naval victory of the war.

== Characters ==
British:

- Jack Aubrey – former captain of HMS Leopard.
- Stephen Maturin – ship's surgeon, friend to Jack and an intelligence officer.
- Sophia Aubrey – Jack's wife and mother of their three children.
- Diana Villiers – love interest of Stephen and cousin of Sophia, living in Boston with Johnson.
- Barret Bonden – the captain's coxswain.
- Preserved Killick – Aubrey's ever loyal servant.
- Babbington – first lieutenant in Leopard.
- Captain Moore – commands the Marines in Leopard.
- Mr Foreshaw – young midshipman on Leopard, killed in the battle aboard Java.
- George Byron, originally a midshipman on HMS Leopard, acting fourth lieutenant after the epidemic. He brings his temporary commission papers with him fleeing the burning ship.
- Faster Doudle – prime seaman on Leopard, played as wicket keeper in the cricket match cut short by arrival of La Flèche
- Admiral Drury – admiral on station at Pulo Batang in the Dutch East Indies.
- Wallis – British intelligence at Pulo Batang, Maturin meets with him.
- Captain Yorke – captain of HMS La Flèche.
- Warner – first lieutenant in La Flèche.
- McLean – young Scottish ship's surgeon in La Flèche, also a skilled anatomist.
- Captain Henry Lambert – captain of HMS Java.
- Chads – first lieutenant in Java.
- General Hislop – Governor-designate of Bombay aboard Java.
- Captain Philip Broke – captain of HMS Shannon.
- Watt – first lieutenant in Shannon, killed in the action.
- Mr Jack – surgeon in Shannon.

American:

- Michael Herapath – once Maturin's assistant on Leopard, he ran from Desolation Island with Mrs Wogan aboard an American whaler; now living in Boston, studying to be a doctor.
- Mrs Louisa Wogan – an attractive young woman and an American spy arrested in England, living with Herapath and their daughter in Boston.
- George Herapath – father of Michael and grandfather of little Caroline, a Loyalist in the American Revolutionary War, reconciled to the new country, as well as a successful Boston merchant, especially in trade with China.
- Otis P. Choate – Doctor in Boston who runs the Asclepia, a small private hospital where Aubrey recuperates.
- Henry (Harry) Johnson – wealthy American from Maryland travelling with Diana, keeps slaves; much involved with US policy and spying. Last seen by Maturin leaving Diana's house in Alipur (India).
- Evans – surgeon in USS Constitution who recommends the Asclepia for Aubrey's recovery.
- Commodore Bainbridge – commander of USS Constitution.
- Jahleel Brenton - of the American Navy Department, with the same name as a recent Baronet in the British Royal Navy, Captain Jahleel Brenton. This led to Aubrey believing him a psychiatric patient on his first visit.
- Captain James Lawrence - captain of USS Chesapeake during the battle with Shannon; previously captain of Hornet.

French:

- Jean-Paul Pontet-Canet – tall Frenchman travelling to the United States from San Salvador on USS Constitution; Maturin met him years before near Toulon, during the Peace of Amiens.
- Jean Dubreuil – French spy in Boston, first seen by Maturin in European capitals.

== Ships ==
- British:
  - HMS Leopard – a 50-gun fourth rate (converted to a troop transport)
  - HMS La Flèche – a 20-gun sixth rate (caught fire and exploded)
  - HMS Cumberland – a 74-gun third rate
  - HMS Java – a 38-gun frigate (destroyed in battle, burned and exploded)
  - HMS Shannon – a 38-gun frigate
  - HMS Aeolus – a 32-gun frigate
  - HMS Belvidera – a 36-gun frigate
- American:
  - USS Constitution – a 44-gun frigate
  - USS Chesapeake – a 38-gun frigate
  - USS President – a 44-gun frigate
  - USS Congress – a 38-gun frigate

== Allusions to history and popular culture ==
The two frigate actions depicted in the novel were real events in the War of 1812: HMS Java was defeated and burned in a single-ship action against USS Constitution on 29 December 1812, and HMS Shannon defeated and captured USS Chesapeake on 1 June 1813. The fictional Aubrey and Maturin have roles in both battles in the novel, first as accidental passengers on Java and then as prisoners of war in Boston who make a timely escape to Shannon. The actions are transformed by O'Brian for storytelling effect. The capture of USS Chesapeake is discussed in an 1866 source mentioned in the Author's Note for The Fortune of War. The victories of the respective nations greatly raised the morale of their sailors during the conflict. For the United States, it proved that their ships could hold their own against the British, and for the United Kingdom, it proved that American ships could be just as easily defeated as the French, Dutch and Spanish, by employing proper tactics.

=== Allusions to literature ===
In Chapter 7, when Maturin looks upon the two corpses in the bath, he reflects that "this is like the end of Titus Andronicus", a play by Shakespeare where corpses pile up as revenge plays out. Then Maturin realizes that his situation is different, as "he had had to kill or be killed" by these French spies, one of whom had tortured to death two friends of his.

=== Allusions to other novels in the series ===
In Chapter 6, Maturin recalls on "the seventeenth of May" that he has been in love with Diana Villiers for "eight years, nine months and some odd days". He met her in Post Captain, during the Peace of Amiens, 1802–1803. Though he seemed to recognize his strong attraction to her immediately in Post Captain, if the fiction is literal, he did not allow himself to fully admit it until the fall of 1804. Initially he considered himself unworthy of her, and not in a position to ask her to marry him, which Sophia Williams had encouraged him to do, knowing her cousin's feelings.

The American Captain Lawrence is brought to meet Aubrey in hospital in Boston in Chapter 7, to bring greetings from Lieutenant Mowett, himself recovering in hospital in New York. Mowett was injured when HMS Peacock was taken by USS Hornet under Lawrence's command. Mowett had been a midshipman and poet in Master and Commander; Maturin recites some of Mowett's lines of original poetry. He was a favorite to both Aubrey and Maturin.

In Chapter 4, Maturin recalls first seeing Pontet-Canet at a restaurant above Toulon when he and Aubrey visited French naval captain and friend Christie-Pallière after leaving England during the Peace of Amiens, in Post Captain. Maturin detected that Pontet-Canet had a different regional French accent then, compared to what he affected in this visit to America.

=== Quotations ===
The changing nature of the connection between the Americans and the British Royal Navy is captured in Aubrey's expressions of gratitude to Michael Herapath for his help in their escape from the French spies, out to a Royal Navy ship in Boston harbour. The American Herapath had served as assistant to Maturin on the Leopard.

"Jack looked long and hard. 'At high water,' he said, 'I shall go into her and run out on the ebb. Will you not come with us, Herapath? I will rate you midshipman in any ship I command, and you could be the Doctor's assistant again. Things might be unpleasant for you in Boston.' 'Oh no, sir,' said Herapath. 'That would never do: though I am obliged to you for your care of me. I have ties here. . . and then, you know, we are enemies.' 'By God, so we are. I had forgot. I find it difficult to think of you as an enemy, Herapath.'" (Chapter 8)

== Reviews ==
This book is sharply different from its immediate predecessors in the series, as it tells of escape and shipwreck, the intensity of intrigue during war rather than battles at sea, though much happens at sea.

Jack doesn’t command a ship in this book, how about that! This is a book with a wrecked ship, a long distance open boat voyage with thirst and cannibalism, two naval battles, lots of exciting spy stuff, and a desperate escape. But it’s utterly different from the previous volumes, which have all been genre sea stories in a way this just isn’t. We were comparing this series with Hornblower earlier—it’s impossible to imagine a Hornblower volume like this. ... I very much like the whole intrigue with Johnson and the French and Stephen—it’s as exciting as the sea chases, but in a very different way. There’s a lot of very good Stephen in this volume—and some wonderful Jack malopropisms.

== Publication history ==
- 1979, UK, Collins hardback First edition ISBN 0-00-222498-4
- 1980, May UK, Fontana paperback ISBN 0006159931
- 1980, UK, Collins hardback ISBN 978-0-00-222498-7
- 1991 W. W. Norton & Company Paperback First USA edition ISBN 0-393-30813-8
- 1992, William A. Thomas Braille Bookstore Hardcover edition
- 1992, Books on Tape; Audio edition ISBN 5555358717
- 1994, W. W. Norton & Company Hardcover edition ISBN 0393037061
- 2001, Thorndike Press Hardcover Large-print edition ISBN 0754015882
- 2001, Thorndike Press Paperback Large-print edition ISBN 0754024490
- Recorded Books, LLC; Unabridged Audio edition narrated by Patrick Tull ISBN 1402591772
- 2011, W. W. Norton & Company e-book edition ISBN 978-0-393-08849-6

This novel was first published by Collins in the UK. There was no US publisher until W W Norton issued a reprint 12 years after the initial publication as part of its reissue in paperback of all the novels in the series prior to 1991.

The process of reissuing the novels initially published prior to 1991 was in full swing in 1991, as the whole series gained a new and wider audience, as Mark Howowitz describes in writing about The Nutmeg of Consolation, the fourteenth novel in the series and initially published in 1991.

Two of my favorite friends are fictitious characters; they live in more than a dozen volumes always near at hand. Their names are Jack Aubrey and Stephen Maturin, and their creator is a 77-year-old novelist named Patrick O'Brian, whose 14 books about them have been continuously in print in England since the first, "Master and Commander," was published in 1970. O'Brian's British fans include T. J. Binyon, Iris Murdoch, A. S. Byatt, Timothy Mo and the late Mary Renault, but, until recently, this splendid saga of two serving officers in the British Royal Navy during the Napoleonic Wars was unavailable in this country, apart from the first few installments which went immediately out of print. Last year, however, W. W. Norton decided to reissue the series in its entirety, and so far nine of the 14 have appeared here, including the most recent chapter, The Nutmeg of Consolation.
