= Action of 24 October 1798 =

Minor naval engagement of the French Revolutionary Wars

- Part of the French Revolutionary Wars
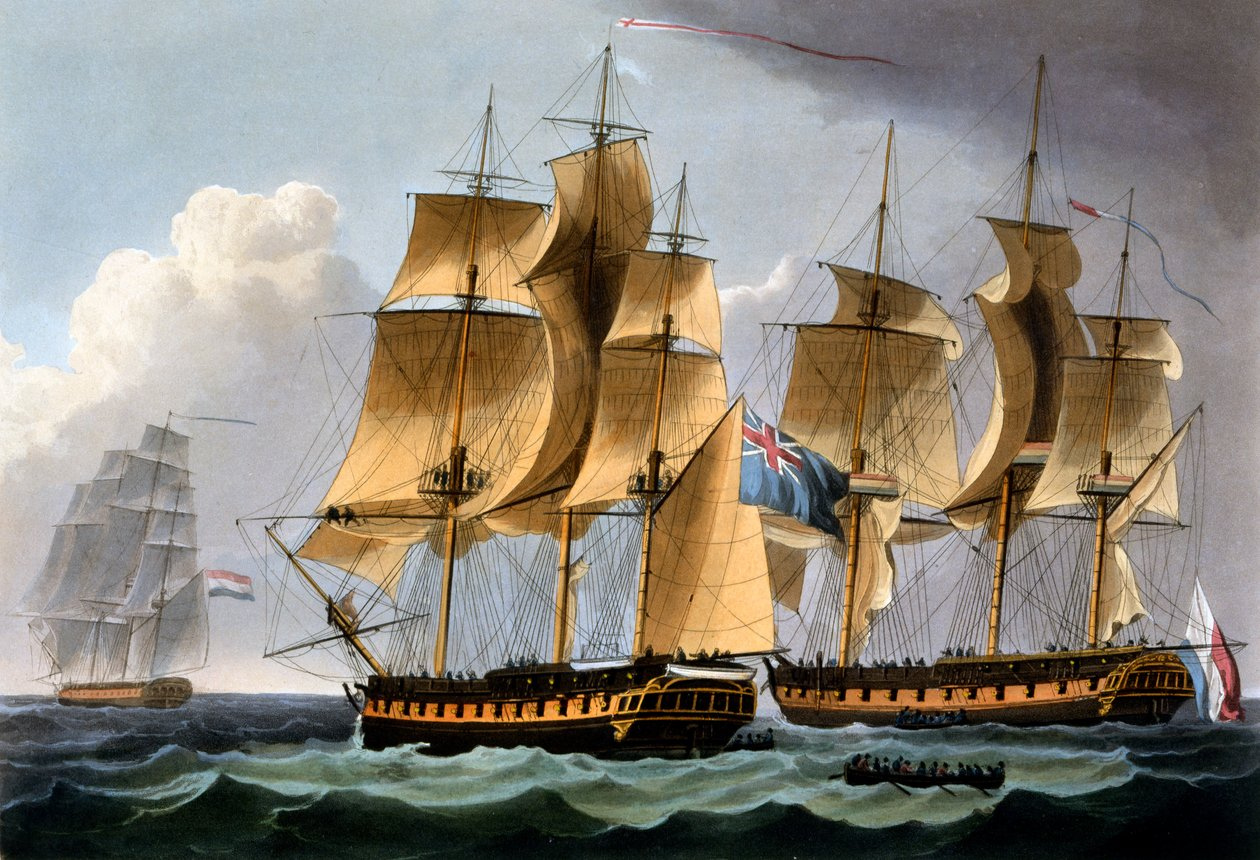
- Capture of the Furie & Waakzaamheid, Oct. 23rd 1798; Thomas Whitcombe
Date	24 October 1798
Location	Off Texel, North Sea 53.099528°N 4.808667°E
Result	British victory

Belligerents
Great Britain	Batavian Republic

Commanders and leaders
Richard King	Meindert van Neirop

Strength
1 frigate	1 frigate 1 corvette

Casualties and losses
1 wounded	8 killed 14 wounded 1 frigate captured 1 corvette captured

The action of 24 October 1798 was a minor naval engagement of the French Revolutionary Wars, fought between a British Royal Navy frigate and two ships of the Batavian Navy. The Dutch ships were intercepted in the North Sea within hours of leaving port, 30 nautical miles (56 km) northwest of the Texel, by the British ship HMS Sirius. Both Dutch vessels were carrying large quantities of military supplies and French soldiers, reinforcements for the French and Irish forces participating in the Irish Rebellion of 1798. Although the rebellion had been defeated a month earlier, word of the British victory had not yet reached the European continent, and the Dutch force was intended to supplement a larger French squadron sent earlier in October. The French had already been defeated at the Battle of Tory Island and the Dutch suffered a similar outcome, both ships defeated in turn by the larger and better armed British vessel.

Captain Richard King on Sirius discovered the Dutch ships early on 24 October, when they were separated by 2 nautical miles (3.7 km) and thus unable to mutually support one another. Targeting the smaller ship, Waakzaamheid, King was able to outrun her in an hour and force her to surrender without a fight. Turning his attention on the larger vessel, Furie, King rapidly overhauled her as well and opened a heavy fire, to which Furie was only able to ineffectively reply. Within half an hour she too had surrendered. Both ships were taken to Britain, repaired and commissioned in the Royal Navy. The defeat ended the last effort by the continental nations to land soldiers in Ireland, and signified the last action of the Irish Rebellion.

== Background ==
Following the French Revolution in 1789, a political organisation was formed in Ireland named the Society of United Irishmen. Crossing social and religious boundaries, this organisation embraced republican principles with the stated goal of removing British government control from Ireland. When Britain went to war with the French Republic in 1793, the organisation was declared illegal and driven under cover, many of its senior members going into exile in Europe or America. These men continued to call for armed resistance to the British government, and in 1796 persuaded the French Directory to launch the Expédition d'Irlande, a large scale invasion of Ireland. The expedition was a disaster, with thousands of French soldiers drowned without a single man successfully landed. Subsequently, the French-controlled government of the Batavian Republic, formerly the Dutch Republic, was persuaded to make an attempt on Ireland in October 1797, but their fleet was intercepted and defeated by Admiral Adam Duncan at the Battle of Camperdown.

In May 1798, the arrest of a number of the leaders of the United Irishmen provoked the Irish Rebellion of 1798, a widespread uprising across Ireland. The Rebellion took the British authorities by surprise, but the introduction of regular British Army troops rapidly defeated the Irish armies and the last resistance was brought to an end in September with the surrender of a small French force at the Battle of Ballinamuck. The French authorities had also been taken by surprise by the uprising, and were consequently unprepared: the forces they deployed were inadequate to face the much larger British armies operating in Ireland at the time. News of this defeat had still not reach the continent by October, when a second French invasion force set out. Closely watched by the Royal Navy as soon as it left Brest, the squadron was defeated on 12 October 1798 at the Battle of Tory Island: fewer than a third of the French ships returned to France.

The Dutch had also been persuaded to send reinforcements to the United Irishmen during the rebellion, but like the French they were unprepared for the sudden uprising and their contributions were not ready until 24 October. Two Dutch ships had been ordered to take on troops and supplies: the 36-gun frigate Furie under Captain Bartholomeus Pletz and the 24-gun corvette Waakzaamheid under Captain Meindert van Neirop, who assumed command of the expedition. Although both ships were small and poorly armed, each carried a number of French soldiers for service in Ireland, Furie embarking 165 and Waakzaamheid 122. In addition, the ships carried over 6,000 stands of arms and large quantities of other military stores with which to arm the Irish irregular forces that they expected to meet.

== Battle ==
Departing on the night of 23/24 October, the Dutch ships made rapid progress and at 08:00 were 30 nautical miles (56 km) northwest of the Texel, sailing westwards towards the English Channel. Within sight of the Dutch ships however was the British frigate HMS Sirius, a new ship of 1,049 long tons (1,066 t), rated as 38-guns but actually carrying 44. She was commanded by Captain Richard King, who had participated in the campaign against the Expédition d'Irlande two years earlier. Sirius had been stationed off the Texel to watch for Dutch movements and intercept any ships of smaller or equal size entering or leaving the waterway. Although van Neirop's squadron outnumbered King's ship, the British vessel was much larger and faster, and the Dutch were also hampered by their position: the two ships were more than 2 nautical miles (3.7 km) apart, too far to offer mutual support against their opponent.

King's first target was the smaller and slower Waakzaamheid, which was windward of Furie and thus would have to sail into the wind to link with Pletz's ship. King rapidly closed with the corvette, avoiding contact with the larger Furie as he did so. At 09:00 Sirius came alongside Waakzaamheid and fired a gun at her, prompting van Neirop to immediately surrender. Furie had not attempted to come to the flagship's aid and resistance against the much larger Sirius would have been futile. King despatched boats containing a prize crew and removed most of the prisoners from Waakzaamheid, placing them below decks on Sirius. Once the prize was secure, King immediately set off in pursuit of Furie, which was attempting to flee to the west and had nearly disappeared over the horizon. For the rest of the day the pursuit continued, Furie unable to escape the faster British ship, which steadily gained during the afternoon until at 17:00 was within range of the Dutch frigate.

King's fire was heavy, but Pletz resisted, responding with his own cannon and continuing his attempts to escape. For half an hour the engagement continued, the distance between the ships varying as Pletz attempted to manoeuvre out of King's range. The British crew were better gunners than the Dutch, and the musketry of the French soldiers aboard had little effect on Sirius as the range between the ships was too great for muskets to be effective. As a result, damage and casualties mounted aboard Furie although Sirius was barely touched, only one shot striking the bowsprit and one man wounded. At approximately 17:30, Pletz surrendered, having lost eight dead and 14 wounded and with his ship badly damaged. King transferred the prisoners and placed a prize crew on Furie before returning to his base at the Nore with his prizes.

== Aftermath ==
The capture of the Dutch ships was the end of the final attempt by a continental nation to land troops in Ireland during the French Revolutionary Wars and the Napoleonic Wars that followed them. Furie and Waakzaamheid were both purchased for the Royal Navy, Furie returned to her pre-war name of Wilhelmina and Waakzaamheid under the same name. The corvette was regraded and the number of guns aboard were reduced to 20 as her frame was not deemed strong enough to carry 24. Richard King remained in Sirius until 1802, and subsequently commanded the ship of the line HMS Achille, participating at the Battle of Trafalgar in 1805.
