= Spanish ship Montañés =

Montañés is the name of the following ships of Spain:

- Montañés, ex-French Pluton, captured 1808, renamed 1810
- Montañés, only ship of the Montañés-class ship of the line, launched 1794, wrecked 1810

== See also ==
- List of ships of the line of Spain
