= Marsdiep =

Deep tide-race between Den Helder and Texel in the Netherlands

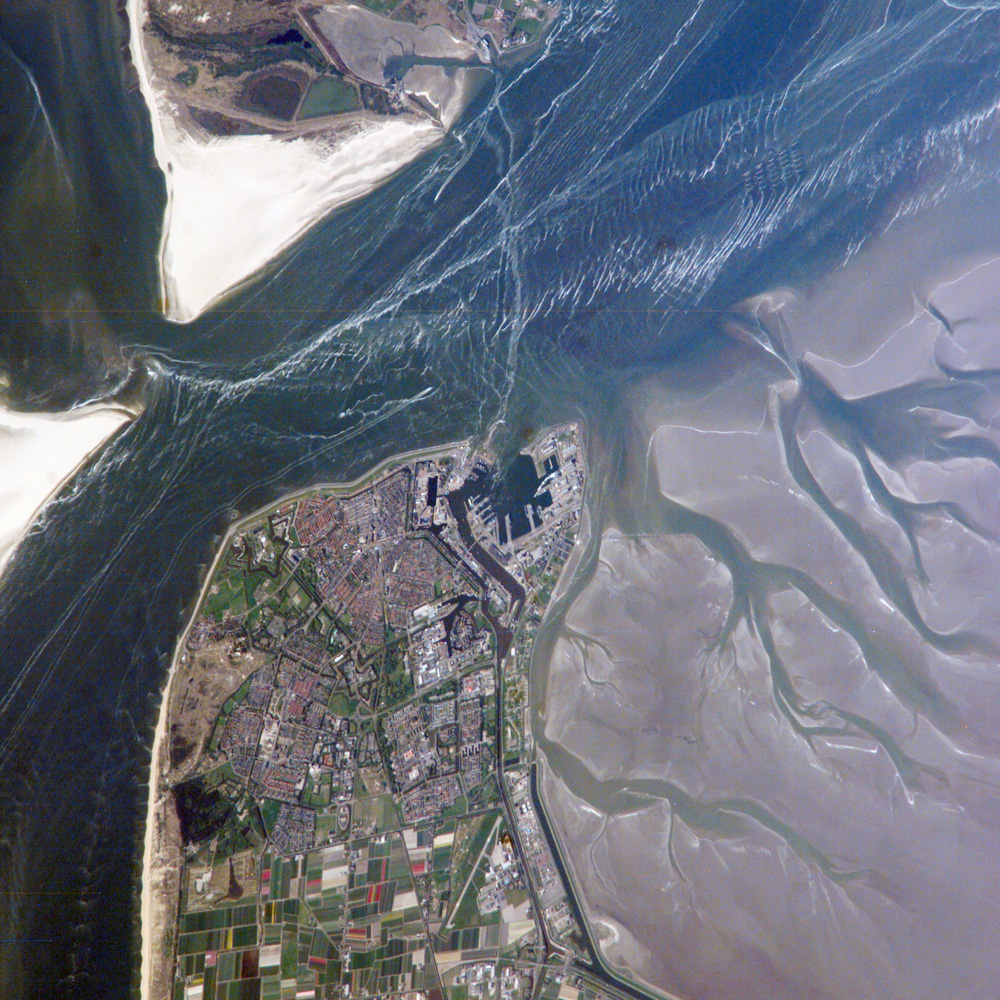
- The Marsdiep
- Location: Between Den Helder and Texel, Netherlands
- Coordinates: 52°59′05″N 4°44′41″E
- Type: Tide-race
- Basin countries: Netherlands
- Islands: Texel

Location
- Interactive map of Marsdiep

The Marsdiep is a deep tide race between Den Helder and Texel in the Netherlands, and running southwards between sandbanks. That gap connects the North Sea and the Waddenzee.

Around 1000 AD and before, much of the modern Waddenzee and IJsselmeer was land and the Marsdiep was an ordinary brook. An early form of its name is Maresdeop, a name probably related to modern Dutch moerasdiep ("swamp deep"). During the All Saints' Flood of 1170, the sea broke through the original dune barrier and created the channel.

The Marsdiep was in the Age of Sail in English called the Texel, in distinction from the island of Texel.
