= List of shipwrecks in 1794 =

The list of shipwrecks in 1794 includes ships sunk, foundered, wrecked, grounded or otherwise lost during 1794.

table of contents
1794
| Jan | Feb | Mar | Apr |
| May | Jun | Jul | Aug |
| Sep | Oct | Nov | Dec |
Unknown date

== January ==
=== 15 January ===
List of shipwrecks: 15 January 1794
| Ship | State | Description |
|---|---|---|
| Mayflower | Great Britain | The crewless sloop was towed in to Dartmouth, Devon. |

=== 22 January ===
List of shipwrecks: 22 January 1794
| Ship | State | Description |
|---|---|---|
| Mulgrave | Great Britain | The ship departed from Whitby, Yorkshire for Liverpool, Lancashire. No further trace, presumed foundered with the loss of all hands. |

=== 23 January ===
List of shipwrecks: 23 January 1794
| Ship | State | Description |
|---|---|---|
| Hope | Great Britain | The privateer cutter was wrecked near Preston, Lancashire with the loss of all on board. She was on a voyage from Liverpool, Lancashire to Gibraltar. |

=== 24 January ===
List of shipwrecks: 24 January 1794
| Ship | State | Description |
|---|---|---|
| Queen of France | Flag unknown | The ship was sighted in the Atlantic Ocean (37°N 47°W) whilst on a voyage from "Schravendul" to Norfolk, Virginia, United States. No further trace, presumed foundered with the loss of all hands. |

=== 25 January ===
List of shipwrecks: 25 January 1794
| Ship | State | Description |
|---|---|---|
| Ann | Great Britain | The ship was lost on this date. |
| Anstruther | Great Britain | The ship was driven ashore near Redcar, Yorkshire. |
| Antelope | Great Britain | The ship was wrecked off St Abb's Head, Berwickshire. |
| Blessing's Increase | Great Britain | The ship was driven ashore on the Yorkshire coast. |
| Charles | Great Britain | The ship was wrecked on the Isle of Arran. |
| Dorothy | Great Britain | The ship was driven ashore near Sunderland, County Durham. |
| Duke of Beaufort | Great Britain | The ship was lost on Shedwell Island. She was on a voyage from Drogheda, County Louth, Ireland to Liverpool, Lancashire. |
| Echo | Great Britain | The ship was lost near Berwick upon Tweed. |
| Four Friends | Great Britain | The ship was driven ashore at Lindisfarne, Northumberland. |
| Francis & Ann | Great Britain | The ship was wrecked at Red Wharf Bay, Anglesey. |
| Friendship | Great Britain | The ship foundered in the North Sea off Borrowstounness, Lothian. |
| Happy Couple | Great Britain | The ship was wrecked at Red Wharf Bay. |
| Hartly | Great Britain | The ship was driven ashore near Beaumaris, Anglesey. |
| Jupiter | Great Britain | The ship was lost in Loch Ryan. |
| Kingston | Great Britain | The ship was wrecked at Seaham, County Durham. |
| Minor | Great Britain | The ship was lost near Hartlepool, County Durham. |
| Nelly & Fanny | Great Britain | The ship was wrecked at Whitehaven, Cumberland. |
| Nautilus | Great Britain | The ship was driven ashore near Sunderland. |
| Neptune | Great Britain | The ship was driven ashore near the mouth of the River Tees. She was on a voyage from London to Stockton-on-Tees, County Durham. |
| Pomona | Great Britain | The ship was driven ashore near "Rawcliffe". |
| Providence | Great Britain | The ship was driven ashore at Lindisfarne. |
| Success | Great Britain | The ship was lost near Whitby, Yorkshire. |
| Tyro | Great Britain | The ship was driven ashore near Sunderland. |
| Woolsington | Great Britain | The ship was driven ashore on the Yorkshire coast. |

=== 27 January ===
List of shipwrecks: 27 January 1794
| Ship | State | Description |
|---|---|---|
| Ann | Great Britain | The transport ship was destroyed by fire at Lisbon, Portugal, or Guernsey, Channel Islands. |

=== 30 January ===
List of shipwrecks: 27 January 1794
| Ship | State | Description |
|---|---|---|
| HMS Amphitrite | Royal Navy | The Porcupine-class post ship was wrecked at Livorno, Grand Duchy of Tuscany. |

=== Unknown date ===
List of shipwrecks: Unknown date in January 1794
| Ship | State | Description |
|---|---|---|
| Alexander | Great Britain | The ship was lost whilst on a voyage from London to South Shields, County Durham. |
| Ariel | Great Britain | The ship foundered in Liverpool Bay. She was on a voyage from Liverpool, Lancashire to Africa. |
| Barbara | Great Britain | The ship was driven ashore near South Shields. |
| Betsey | Great Britain | The ship was driven ashore at Hals, Denmark. |
| Betsey | Great Britain | The ship was driven ashore and wrecked near Cádiz, Spain. She was on a voyage from Fowey, Cornwall to Naples, Kingdom of Sicily. |
| Betsey | Great Britain | The ship was driven ashore on the coast of Scotland. |
| Cassandra | Ireland | The ship was driven ashore 20 leagues (52 nmi; 97 km) from the mouth of the River Foyle. She was on a voyage from St. Ubes, Portugal to Limerick. |
| Christian & Jannet | Great Britain | The ship was driven ashore on the coast of Scotland. |
| Concordia | Flag unknown | The ship was driven ashore and wrecked on Læsø, Denmark. She was on a voyage from Saint Petersburg, Russia to Spain. |
| Countess of Kintore | Great Britain | The ship was driven ashore on the coast of Scotland. She was on a voyage from Leith, Lothian to Aberdeen. |
| Delaware | United States | The ship was driven ashore and wrecked at Liverpool. She was on a voyage from Ostend, West Flanders, Dutch Republic to Liverpool. |
| Doncaster | Great Britain | The ship was lost near Filey, Yorkshire with the loss of all hands. |
| Drake | Great Britain | The ship was lost on the coast of Norway. She was on a voyage from Pillau, Prussia to Rotterdam, South Holland, Dutch Republic. |
| Elizabeth | Denmark | The ship was wrecked on the Anholt Reef, in the Baltic Sea. She was on a voyage from Copenhagen to Saint Croix. |
| Fame | Great Britain | The ship was wrecked on the Welsh coast. She was on a voyage from Youghall, County Cork, Ireland to Liverpool. |
| George | Great Britain | The ship was driven ashore and wrecked at Margate, Kent. She was on a voyage from Virginia, United States to London. |
| Hazard | Great Britain | The ship was driven ashore near South Shields. |
| Hellen | Great Britain | The ship was driven ashore on the coast of Scotland. |
| Hope | Great Britain | The ship foundered in Liverpool Bay with the loss of all hands. She was on a voyage from Liverpool to a Mediterranean port. |
| Industry | Great Britain | The ship foundered off the Lemon Sand. Her crew were rescued. She was on a voyage from Portsmouth, Hampshire to Sunderland, County Durham. |
| James | Great Britain | The ship was lost at Amlwch, Anglesey. She was on a voyage from Dublin, Ireland to London. |
| Jenny | Great Britain | The ship was driven ashore and wrecked near Liverpool. She was on a voyage from Liverpool to Africa. |
| Jenny | Ireland | The ship foundered in the Sound of Islay. She was on a voyage from Barbados to Derry. |
| Jong Johanna | Great Britain | The ship was driven ashore on Læsø. She was on a voyage from Saint Petersburg to Spain. Jong Johanna was later refloated and take in to Marstrand, Norway for repairs. |
| Lieth Packet | Great Britain | The ship was lost at Saltburn, Yorkshire. She was on a voyage from London to South Shields. |
| Margaret | Great Britain | The ship was driven ashore on the coast of Scotland. |
| Maria | Great Britain | The ship was wrecked on a sandbank in the North Sea off Great Yarmouth, Norfolk. Her crew were rescued. |
| Maria | Great Britain | The ship was driven ashore and wrecked at Liverpool. She was on a voyage from Liverpool to Virginia. |
| Martin | Great Britain | The ship was driven ashore near Whitby, Yorkshire. |
| May Flower | Great Britain | Captain Gray's ship was driven ashore near Whitby. |
| May Flower | Great Britain | Captain Lewin's ship was driven ashore and wrecked near Dunstanburgh Castle, Northumberland with the loss of Lewin and three crew. She was on a voyage from Portsmouth to Montrose, Forfarshire. |
| Mercury | Great Britain | The ship was lost near Conwy, Denbighshire. She was on a voyage from Virginia to Liverpool. |
| Neptune | Great Britain | The ship foundered off Dungeon's Knoll. Her crew were rescued. |
| Olive | Great Britain | The ship was driven ashore and wrecked at Liverpool. She was on a voyage from Liverpool to the Straits of Gibraltar. |
| Oriano | Great Britain | The ship was driven ashore near Den Haag, South Holland, Dutch Republic. She was on a voyage from London to Middelburg, Zeeland, Dutch Republic. |
| Oswell | Great Britain | The ship was driven ashore near South Shields. |
| Peace and Plenty | Great Britain | The ship sank near Dublin. She was on a voyage from Bristol, Gloucestershire to Dublin. |
| Peggy | Great Britain | The ship was lost at Pontevedra, Spain. Her crew were rescued. |
| Raith | Great Britain | The ship was driven ashore on the coast of Scotland. She was on a voyage from Hamburg to Leith. |
| Rochedale | Great Britain | The ship was driven ashore and severely damaged at Falmouth, Cornwall. She was on a voyage from Liverpool, Lancashire to Lisbon, Portugal. |
| San Joseph y Animas | Spain | The ship ran aground and was wrecked 4 leagues (10 nmi; 19 km) from Bilbao. Her crew were rescued. She was on a voyage from Amsterdam, North Holland, Dutch Republic to Bilbao. |
| St Patrick Packet | Ireland | The ship was lost near Amlwch. She was on a voyage from Dublin to Liverpool. |
| Surry | Great Britain | The ship foundered in the North Sea off Aldeburgh, Suffolk. Her crew were rescued. |
| Union | United States | The snow foundered in the Irish Sea off Great Orme, Carnarvonshire, Great Britain. She was on a voyage from Virginia to Dublin. |
| Wyre | Great Britain | The ship was driven ashore near Whitby. She was refloated in March. |

== February ==
=== 8 February ===
List of shipwrecks: 8 February 1794
| Ship | State | Description |
|---|---|---|
| Britannia | Great Britain | Wreck of the Ten Sail: The ship was wrecked off the Cayman Islands. She was on a voyage from Jamaica to Glasgow, Renfrewshire. |
| HMS Convert | (Kingdom of Great Britain) Royal Navy | Wreck of the Ten Sail: The frigate was wrecked off the Cayman Islands. |
| Eagle | (Kingdom of Great Britain) Jamaica | Wreck of the Ten Sail: The ship was wrecked off the Cayman Islands. She was on a voyage from Jamaica to London. |
| Fortune | Great Britain | Wreck of the Ten Sail: The brig was wrecked off the Cayman Islands. Her crew were rescued. She was on a voyage from Jamaica to Bristol, Gloucestershire. |
| Ludlow | Great Britain | Wreck of the Ten Sail: The ship was wrecked off the Cayman Islands. She was on a voyage from Jamaica to London. |
| Moorhall | Great Britain | Wreck of the Ten Sail: The ship was wrecked off the Cayman Islands. She was on a voyage from Jamaica to Liverpool, Lancashire. |
| Nancy | Great Britain | Wreck of the Ten Sail: The ship was wrecked off the Cayman Islands. She was on a voyage from Jamaica to Glasgow. |
| Richard | Ireland | Wreck of the Ten Sail: The ship was wrecked off the Cayman Islands. She was on a voyage from Jamaica to Belfast, County Antrim. |
| Sally | (Kingdom of Great Britain) Jamaica | Wreck of the Ten Sail: The brig was wrecked off the Cayman Islands. |
| William and Elizabeth | Great Britain | Wreck of the Ten Sail: The ship was wrecked off the Cayman Islands. She was on a voyage from Jamaica to London. |

=== 12 February ===
List of shipwrecks: 12 February 1794
| Ship | State | Description |
|---|---|---|
| HMS Spitfire | (Kingdom of Great Britain) Royal Navy | The sloop of war capsized and sank off Saint-Domingue, Hispaniola with the loss of all but four of her crew. The survivors were rescued by Saucy Tom (Great Britain). |

=== 18 February ===
List of shipwrecks: 18 February 1794
| Ship | State | Description |
|---|---|---|
| Minerve | French Navy | The Minerve-class frigate was scuttled at Saint-Florent, Corsica. She was raised the next day by the Royal Navy. Subsequently repaired and taken into service as HMS San Fiorenzo. |

=== Unknown date ===
List of shipwrecks: Unknown date in February 1794
| Ship | State | Description |
|---|---|---|
| Adventure | Great Britain | The ship was lost near Wexford, Ireland. |
| Dove | Great Britain | The ship foundered in the North Sea off Sunderland, County Durham with the loss of all hands. |
| Emmannuel | Great Britain | The ship was driven ashore near Newhaven, Sussex. She was on a voyage from Zant, Republic of Venice to London. |
| Jane | Ireland | The ship was driven ashore at Westport, County Mayo. She was on a voyage from Lisbon, Portugal to Dublin. |
| Joseph | Great Britain | The ship was driven ashore at Great Yarmouth, Norfolk. She was on a voyage from North Shields, County Durham to London. |
| Neptune | Great Britain | The ship was driven ashore and wrecked near Youghall, County Cork, Ireland. She was on a voyage from Cork to Liverpool, Lancashire. |
| Property | Great Britain | The ship was wrecked near Blyth, Northumberland with the loss of all hands. She was on a voyage from London to Newcastle upon Tyne, Northumberland and Tynemouth, County Durham. |
| Providence | Great Britain | The ship foundered in the North Sea with the loss of two of her crew. She was on a voyage from Aberdeen to Kingston upon Hull, Yorkshire. |
| Rose | Great Britain | The ship was lost in Mount's Bay. She was on a voyage from Lisbon, Portugal to London. |
| Success | Great Britain | The ship was run down and sunk by another vessel. Her crew were rescued. |
| Thomas | Great Britain | The ship was driven ashore on Rathlin Island, County Antrim, Ireland. She was on a voyage from Lancaster, Lancashire to Cork and Saint Kitts. |
| Two Friends | Great Britain | The ship was lost near Varberg, Sweden. Her crew were rescued. |

== March ==
=== 15 March ===
List of shipwrecks: 15 March 1794
| Ship | State | Description |
|---|---|---|
| Catherine | Denmark | The ship departed from Alicante, Spain for Newry, County Antrim, Ireland. No further trace, presumed foundered in the Atlantic Ocean with the loss of all hands. |

=== 29 March ===
List of shipwrecks: 29 March 1794
| Ship | State | Description |
|---|---|---|
| Trio | Great Britain | The ship departed from Zant, Venetian Republic for London. No further trace, presumed foundered with the loss of all hands. |

=== Unknown date ===
List of shipwrecks: Unknown date in March 1794
| Ship | State | Description |
|---|---|---|
| Active | Great Britain | The ship was driven ashore at Milford Haven, Pembrokeshire. She was on a voyage from Limerick, Ireland to Ilfracombe, Devon. |
| Ann | Great Britain | The ship foundered in the Atlantic Ocean off Land's End, Cornwall. Her crew were rescued. |
| Bird | Great Britain | The ship was driven ashore in Gibraltar Bay. She was on a voyage from Cagliari, Sicily to Greenock, Renfrewshire. |
| Brothers | Great Britain | The ship departed from London for São Miguel Island, Azores. No further trace, presumed foundered with the loss of all hands. |
| Cæsar | Great Britain | War of the First Coalition: The ship was captured by a French Navy 74-gun ship of the line and was ordered into a French port, but was wrecked on the French coast. Cæsar was on a voyage from the Isle of Man to the Straits of Gibraltar. |
| Eliza | Great Britain | The ship was wrecked on the Mixon Sands with the loss of all hands while on a voyage from Bridgwater, Somerset to Liverpool, Lancashire. |
| Flora | Ireland | The ship was lost near Loop Head, County Clare. Her crew were rescued. She was on a voyage from Lisbon, Portugal to Limerick. |
| Funtingdon | Great Britain | The ship sank at Ramsgate, Kent. She was on a voyage from Sunderland, County Durham to Southampton, Hampshire. |
| Kawnintz | Dutch East India Company | The East Indiaman was driven ashore and wrecked near Ostend, West Flanders. She was on a voyage from Ostend to India. |
| London | Great Britain | War of the First Coalition: The ship was captured off the coast of Norway by the privateer Le Subtile (France) and was burnt. |
| Sisters | Great Britain | War of the First Coalition: The ship was captured and sunk off the coast of Norway by the privateer Le Subtile (France). |
| Thomas | Great Britain | War of the First Coalition: The ship was captured off the coast of Norway by the privateer Le Subtile (France) and was burnt. |
| Three Friends | Great Britain | The ship was lost near Aberavon, Glamorgan. She was on a voyage from London to Swansea, Glamorgan. |

== April ==
=== 13 April ===
List of shipwrecks: 13 April 1794
| Ship | State | Description |
|---|---|---|
| Black Prince | (Kingdom of Great Britain) Guernsey | War of the First Coalition The ship was captured and sunk by a French frigate. She was on a voyage from Guernsey to Madeira |

=== 29 April ===
List of shipwrecks: 29 April 1794
| Ship | State | Description |
|---|---|---|
| Friendship | Great Britain | The ship sank at Gothenburg, Sweden. She was on a voyage from London to Saint Petersburg, Russia. |
| Kron Prince | Sweden | The ship was lost at Gothenburg. |
| Sara Frederica | Danzig | The ship was lost near Gothenburg. She was on a voyage from Danzig to London. |

=== 30 April ===
List of shipwrecks: 30 April 1794
| Ship | State | Description |
|---|---|---|
| Commerce | Great Britain | The ship was wrecked at St. Mary's Cape, Newfoundland, British North America with the loss of her captain. |

=== Unknown date ===
List of shipwrecks: Unknown date in April 1794
| Ship | State | Description |
|---|---|---|
| Adventure | Great Britain | The sloop was destroyed by fire near Weymouth, Dorset. She was on a voyage from Lyme, Dorset to London. |
| Ann | Great Britain | The ship was run down and sunk in the North Sea off Whitby, Yorkshire. |
| HMS Ardent | (Kingdom of Great Britain) Royal Navy | The Crown-class ship of the line caught fire, exploded and sank in the Gulf of Genoa with the loss of all 500 crew. |
| Benevolence | Great Britain | The ship was wrecked at "Robsnoot", Jutland. |
| Burlington | Great Britain | The ship was wrecked in the Orkney Islands. She was on a voyage from Liverpool, Lancashire to Ostend, West Flanders, Dutch Republic. |
| Castor | Great Britain | The ship was lost near Limerick, Ireland. |
| Eleanor | Great Britain | The ship was run down and sunk in the North Sea off Whitby by Tryal (Great Britain) with the loss of six of her crew. Eleanor was on a voyage from Kingston upon Hull, Yorkshire to Newcastle upon Tyne, Northumberland. |
| Essex | Great Britain | The sloop was lost near Limerick. |
| Friendship | Great Britain | The ship was driven ashore in the King Road. She was on a voyage from Bristol, Gloucestershire to Jamaica. |
| Good Intent | Great Britain | The ship was driven ashore and wrecked on Texel, North Holland, Dutch Republic. She was on a voyage from Naples, Kingdom of Sicily to Amsterdam, North holland. |
| Good Intent | Ireland | The ship was wrecked in the "Scotch Islands". Her crew were rescued. She was on a voyage from Danzig to Londonderry. |
| James | Great Britain | The ship was run down and sunk in the Atlantic Ocean off the Isles of Scilly. She was on a voyage from Caernarfon to London. |
| Juffrow Nieltje | Dutch Republic | The ship was lost on the coast of Ireland. She was on a voyage from Cádiz, Spain to Amsterdam. |
| Jung Frow Henrietta | Dutch Republic | The ship was driven ashore near Elsinore, Denmark. She was on a voyage from Königsberg, Prussia to Amsterdam. |
| Lark | Great Britain | The ship was wrecked at St. Ives, Cornwall while on a voyage from Waterford, Ireland to Chichester, Sussex. |
| Mary | Great Britain | The ship was lost in the Orkney Islands. Her crew were rescued. She was on a voyage from Liverpool to Ostend. |
| Olive Branch | Great Britain | The ship foundered in the North Sea. |
| Thomas | Great Britain | The ship was run down and sunk in the English Channel off The Lizard, Cornwall by Norfolk (Great Britain). Her crew were rescued. Thomas was on a voyage from Biddiford, Devon to Pool, Dorset. |
| Three Brothers | Great Britain | The ship was wrecked on the coast of Cornwall. She was on a voyage from Waterford to Newhaven, Sussex. |
| Trannyon | Great Britain | The ship foundered in the Irish Sea off Limerick. |
| HMS Victorious | (Kingdom of Great Britain) Royal Navy | The Culloden-class ship of the line ran aground on the Shipwash Sand, in the North Sea off the coast of Suffolk and was dismasted. |

== May ==
=== 8 May ===
List of shipwrecks: 8 May 1794
| Ship | State | Description |
|---|---|---|
| HMS Placentia | (Kingdom of Great Britain) Royal Navy | The Placentia-class sloop ran aground on a reef off Marticot, Newfoundland, British North America and was wrecked. Her crew survived. |

=== 21 May ===
List of shipwrecks: 21 May 1794
| Ship | State | Description |
|---|---|---|
| Dumaresq | Dutch Republic | War of the First Coalition, Atlantic campaign of May 1794: The ship was recaptured by a Royal Navy squadron under the command of Lord Howe, but was burnt. |
| Fiott | Dutch Republic | War of the First Coalition, Atlantic campaign of May 1794: The ship was recaptured by a Royal Navy squadron under the command of Lord Howe, but was burnt. |
| Major Pierson | Dutch Republic | War of the First Coalition, Atlantic campaign of May 1794: The ship was recaptured by a Royal Navy squadron under the command of Lord Howe, but was burnt. |
| Neptune | Dutch Republic | War of the First Coalition, Atlantic campaign of May 1794: The ship was recaptured by a Royal Navy squadron under the command of Lord Howe, but was burnt. |
| Shift | Dutch Republic | War of the First Coalition, Atlantic campaign of May 1794: The ship was recaptured by a Royal Navy squadron under the command of Lord Howe, but was burnt. |
| Swallow | Dutch Republic | War of the First Coalition, Atlantic campaign of May 1794: The ship was recaptured by a Royal Navy squadron under the command of Lord Howe, but was burnt. |

=== Unknown date ===
List of shipwrecks: Unknown date in May 1794
| Ship | State | Description |
|---|---|---|
| Agurtha Elizabeth | Flag unknown | The ship was lost near Marstrand, Sweden. She was on a voyage from St. Ubes, Portugal to a Baltic port. |
| Albion | Great Britain | War of the First Coalition, Atlantic campaign of May 1794: The ship was captured by the French. She was recaptured by a squadron of Royal Navy ships under the command of Lord Howe but was burnt. Albion was on a voyage from Liverpool, Lancashire to Dominica. |
| Atlanta | Great Britain | War of the First Coalition, Atlantic campaign of May 1794: The ship was captured by the French. She was recapturd by a squadron of Royal Navy ships under the command of Lord Howe, but was burnt. Atlanta was on a voyage from Barcelona, Spain to Bristol, Gloucestershire. |
| Aurora | Great Britain | The ship was driven ashore at the Niding. |
| Brown Horse | Great Britain | The ship was driven ashore near Harwich, Essex. She was on a voyage from Danzig to London. |
| Elizabeth | Danzig | The ship foundered off the "Rotehead". Her crew were rescued. She was on a voyage from Danzig to Rotterdam, South Holland, Dutch Republic. |
| Friends | Ireland | The ship was driven ashore and severely damaged on Islay, Inner Hebrides, Great Britain. She was on a voyage from Belfast, County Antrim to Saint Petersburg, Russia. Friends was later refloated and taken in to Bangor, County Down. |
| George | Great Britain | The ship was lost at Skagen, Denmark. Her crew were rescued. She was on a voyage from Campbeltown, Argyllshire to Saint Petersburg. |
| Gerardina Maria | Dutch Republic | War of the First Coalition, Atlantic campaign of May 1794: The ship was captured by the French. She was recaptured by a squadron of Royal Navy ships under the command of Lord Howe, but was burnt. Gerardina Maria was on a voyage from Lisbon, Portugal to Amsterdam, North Holland. |
| Helmsly | Great Britain | The ship was driven ashore in "Chealse Sound". |
| Hoppel Gustaff | Sweden | The ship ran aground on the Longsand, in the North Sea. She was on a voyage from Stockholm to Genoa. |
| John and Richard | Great Britain | The ship was driven ashore south of Gothenburg, Sweden. |
| Jonge Pieter | Dutch Republic | War of the First Coalition: The ship was captured by the French. She was recaptured by a squadron of Royal Navy ships under the command of Lord Howe, but was burnt. Jonge Pieter was on a voyage from Lisbon to Amsterdam. |
| Manley | Great Britain | The ship was lost south of Gothenburg. |
| Nancy | Great Britain | The ship was driven ashore and wrecked at "Torchs", Sweden. She was on a voyage from Kingston upon Hull, Yorkshire to Saint Petersburg. |
| Nancy | Great Britain | War of the First Coalition: The ship was captured by two French frigates and was burnt. She was on a voyage from London to Tenerife, Spain and British Honduras. |
| Robert's Adventure | Great Britain | The ship was lost near Memel, Prussia. |
| Two Brothers | Great Britain | The ship was driven ashore near Dragør, Denmark. She was on a voyage from Kingston upon Hull to Saint Petersburg. |
| Tiber | Great Britain | War of the First Coalition: The ship was captured by the French. She was recaptured by a squadron of Royal Navy ship under the command of Lord Howe, but was burnt. Tiber was on a voyage from Tenerife to Bristol. |
| Vigilant | Great Britain | The ship struck rocks and sank near "Masterland", Sweden. |
| William | Great Britain | War of the First Coalition, Atlantic campaign of May 1794: The ship was captured by Sans Pareil (French Navy). She was recaptured by a squadron of Royal Navy ships under the command of Lord Howe, but was burnt. William was on a voyage from Bristol to Newfoundland, British America. |

== June ==
=== 1 June ===
List of shipwrecks: 1 June 1794
| Ship | State | Description |
|---|---|---|
| Vengeur du Peuple | French Navy | Vengeur du Peuple (right) War of the First Coalition, Glorious First of June: The ship of the line was sunk by HMS Brunswick and HMS Ramilles (both (Kingdom of Great Britain) Royal Navy). A total of 367 crew were rescued by HMS Alfred, HMS Culloden and HMS Rattler (all (Kingdom of Great Britain) Royal Navy). Around 350 of her crew were killed in battle or the consequent sinking. |

=== 26 June ===
List of shipwrecks: 26 June 1794
| Ship | State | Description |
|---|---|---|
| Neptune | Great Britain | The ship was lost at Domesnes, Norway. She was on a voyage from Riga, Russia to Plymouth, Devon. |

=== 28 June ===
List of shipwrecks: 28 June 1794
| Ship | State | Description |
|---|---|---|
| HMS Rose | (Kingdom of Great Britain) Royal Navy | The Enterprise-class frigate ran aground off Rocky Point, Jamaica and was wrecked. Her crew survived. |

=== Unknown date ===
List of shipwrecks: Unknown date in June 1794
| Ship | State | Description |
|---|---|---|
| Dorothea Carolina | Stettin | The ship was lost on Öland, Sweden. She was on a voyage from Stettin to Saint Petersburg, Russia. |
| Fortitude | Great Britain | War of the First Coalition: The ship was captured by the French off Madeira and was burnt. She was on a voyage from the Straits of Gibraltar to Guernsey. |

== July ==
=== 1 July ===
List of shipwrecks: 1 July 1794
| Ship | State | Description |
|---|---|---|
| Impressa (Импресса) | Imperial Russian Navy | The transport ship was driven ashore and wrecked at ru:Cape Seraya Loshad in the Gulf of Finland. She was on a voyage from Kronstadt to Kotka, Old Finland. Her crew were rescued by the transport ship Ailla Margarita (Аилла Маргарита, Imperial Russian Navy). |

=== 10 July ===
List of shipwrecks: 10 July 1794
| Ship | State | Description |
|---|---|---|
| Amity Hall | Great Britain | The ship was lost at Jamaica. She was on a voyage from Jamaica to London. |

=== 21 July ===
List of shipwrecks: 21 July 1794
| Ship | State | Description |
|---|---|---|
| Durham | Ireland | War of the First Coalition: The ship was captured and sunk by two French privateers. She was on a voyage from Dublin to Memel, Prussia. |

=== 31 July ===
List of shipwrecks: 31 July 1794
| Ship | State | Description |
|---|---|---|
| Britannia, and Maria Elizabeth | Great Britain; Hamburg | The ships collided in the River Thames. Britannia was beached at Pitcher's Point. She was on a voyage from London to Jamaica. Maria Elizabeth was beached near Blackwall, Middlesex. Maria Elizabeth was on a voyage from London to Hamburg. |

=== Unknown date ===
List of shipwrecks: Unknown date in July 1794
| Ship | State | Description |
|---|---|---|
| Ann | Great Britain | The ship was driven ashore near Yarmouth, Isle of Wight. She was on a voyage from London to Guadeloupe. |
| Britannia | Great Britain | The ship ran aground in the River Thames at Cuckold's Point, Surrey. She was on a voyage from Jamaica to London. |
| Lark | Great Britain | The ship was lost with all hands. She was on a voyage from Liverpool, Lancashire to Campbeltown, Argyllshire. |
| Molly & Catherine | Great Britain | The ship was driven ashore near Kirkwall, Orkney Islands. She was on a voyage from the Shetland Islands to Liverpool. |
| Thomas | Great Britain | The ship ran aground on the Gunfleet Sand, in the North Sea off the coast of Essex. She was refloated with assistance from HMRC Fly (Great Britain) and assisted in to Harwich, Essex. |
| West Port | Ireland | The ship foundered in the Atlantic Ocean off Madeira. Her crew were rescued. |

== August ==
=== 8 August ===
List of shipwrecks: 8 August 1794
| Ship | State | Description |
|---|---|---|
| Catherine Green | Great Britain | The ship was wrecked on the Florida Reef. She was on a voyage from Jamaica to London. |

=== 12 August ===
List of shipwrecks: 12 August 1794
| Ship | State | Description |
|---|---|---|
| Tamerlane | Great Britain | War of the First Coalition: The ship was captured and burnt in the Grand Banks of Newfoundland by a squadron of French frigates. She was on a voyage from Jamaica to London. |

=== 17 August ===
List of shipwrecks: 17 August 1794
| Ship | State | Description |
|---|---|---|
| Juno | Great Britain | The ship was wrecked on St Catharine's Island. She was on a voyage from British Honduras to London. |

=== 23 August ===
List of shipwrecks: 23 August 1794
| Ship | State | Description |
|---|---|---|
| Alerte | French Navy | War of the First Coalition: The corvette, a captured Pylades-class ship-sloop, was driven ashore and wrecked off Audierne, Finistère whilst evading HMS Arethusa, HMS Diamond and HMS Flora (all (Kingdom of Great Britain) Royal Navy). |
| Espion | French Navy | War of the First Coalition: The Sloop-of-War was driven ashore at Audierne by HMS Arethusa, HMS Diamond and HMS Flora (all (Kingdom of Great Britain) Royal Navy). She was later refloated, repaired and returned to service. |
| Félicité | Great Britain | War of the First Coalition: The Félicité-class frigate was driven ashore at Audierne by HMS Arethusa, HMS Diamond and HMS Flora (all (Kingdom of Great Britain) Royal Navy). She was later refloated, repaired and returned to service. |

=== 24 August ===
List of shipwrecks: 24 August 1794
| Ship | State | Description |
|---|---|---|
| Impétueux | Great Britain | The Téméraire-class ship of the line was destroyed by fire at Portsmouth, Hampshire. |

=== 28 August ===
List of shipwrecks: 28 August 1794
| Ship | State | Description |
|---|---|---|
| Sandown | Great Britain | The ship was driven ashore and wrecked in a hurricane at Havana, Cuba. She was on a voyage from Jamaica to London. |
| Vigilant | Great Britain | The ship was driven ashore and wrecked in a hurricane at Cape Florida, New Spain. |

=== Unknown date ===
List of shipwrecks: Unknown date in August 1794
| Ship | State | Description |
|---|---|---|
| Ann | Great Britain | War of the First Coalition: The ship was captured and sunk off Waterford, Ireland by Agricola (French Navy). |
| British King | Great Britain | The ship sprang a leak and foundered in the North Sea off Great Yarmouth, Norfolk. |
| De Vrouw Elizabeth | Dutch Republic | War of the First Coalition: The ship was captured by the French off Texel, North Holland and was burnt. She was on a voyage from Alicante, Spain to Amsterdam. |
| De Vrouw Margaretha | Dutch Republic | War of the First Coalition: The ship was captured and sunk in the North Sea by a French privateer while on a voyage from Groningen to London, Great Britain. |
| Fremantle | Great Britain | The ship was destroyed by fire in the River Thames at Deptford, Kent. She was on a voyage from Jamaica to London. |
| George | Great Britain | The ship was lost on Scamner Island. She was on a voyage from Swansea, Glamorgan to Dublin, Ireland. |
| Linnenhall | Great Britain | The ship was driven ashore near Portaferry, County Down, Ireland. She was on a voyage from London to Belfast, County Antrim, Ireland. |
| Maria | Great Britain | War of the First Coalition: The ship was captured by a French squadron off Cape Clear Island, County Cork, Ireland and was scuttled. She was on a voyage from Liverpool, Lancashire to Chaleur Bay, Newfoundland, British America. |
| Milford | Great Britain | The ship was driven ashore at Margate, Kent. She was on a voyage from London to Newhaven, Sussex. |
| Neptune | Great Britain | The ship was destroyed by fire in the River Thames. She was on a voyage from Jamaica to London. |
| Newhaven | Great Britain | War of the First Coalition: The ship was captured and sunk by a French frigate. She was on a voyage from Spain to Liverpool. |
| Pleasant Hill | Great Britain | The ship was driven ashore at Margate. |
| Queen | Great Britain | The ship was wrecked on the Kentish Knock. Her crew were rescued. She was on a voyage from Riga, Russia to San Sebastián, Spain. |
| Queen of Portugal | Great Britain | The ship was lost near Birkdale, Lancashire. She was on a voyage from Liverpool, Lancashire to Livorno, Grand Duchy of Tuscany. |
| Syren | Great Britain | The ship foundered 14 leagues (36 nmi; 68 km) west of Barcelona, Spain. She was on a voyage from Scotland to Barcelona. |
| Vrow Elizabeth | (flag) Dutch Republic | The ship was captured and burnt off Texel, North Holland. She was on a voyage from Alicante, Spain to Amsterdam, North Holland. |

== September ==
=== 2 September ===
List of shipwrecks: 2 September 1794
| Ship | State | Description |
|---|---|---|
| Charming Molly | Great Britain | War of the First Coalition: The ship was captured and sunk by the French. She was on a voyage from Liverpool, Lancashire to Porto, Portugal. |

=== 3 September ===
List of shipwrecks: 3 September 1794
| Ship | State | Description |
|---|---|---|
| Margarita (Маргарита) | Imperial Russian Navy | The transport ship was driven ashore on Seskar in the Gulf of Finland. Her crew were rescued. She was on a voyage from Kronstadt to Reval. The ship was carried off by waves on 7 September and was subsequently seen burning off ru:Styrsudd, where her wreckage also washed up later. |

=== 6 September ===
List of shipwrecks: 6 September 1794
| Ship | State | Description |
|---|---|---|
| Nelly | Great Britain | War of the First Coalition: The ship was captured off the Orkney Islands by the French and was burnt. She was on a voyage from Memel, Prussia to the Clyde. |
| Royal Tar | Great Britain | War of the First Coalition: The ship was captured and burnt by Galathée (French Navy). She was on a voyage from Prussia to Messina, Sicily. |

=== 19 September ===
List of shipwrecks: 19 September 1794
| Ship | State | Description |
|---|---|---|
| Elsineaur | (Denmark) Danish Asiatic Company | The East Indiaman was destroyed by fire in the Atlantic Ocean. There were 123 survivors. She was on a voyage from Bengal, India to Copenhagen. |

=== 24 September ===
List of shipwrecks: 24 September 1794
| Ship | State | Description |
|---|---|---|
| Three Brothers | Great Britain | The ship was lost in the Baltic. Her crew were rescued. She was on a voyage from Newcastle upon Tyne, Northumberland to Stockholm, Sweden. |

=== Unknown date ===
List of shipwrecks: Unknown date in September 1794
| Ship | State | Description |
|---|---|---|
| Aurora | Ireland | The ship was wrecked on the Irish coast. She was on a voyage from Philadelphia, Pennsylvania, United States to Dingle, County Kerry. |
| Barbadoes | Great Britain | War of the First Coalition: The ship was destroyed at Sierra Leone by Experiment, Félicité, Mutine, Épervier, and Vigilance (all French Navy). |
| Bess | Great Britain | War of the First Coalition: The ship was destroyed at Sierra Leone by Experiment, Félicité, Mutine, Épervier, and Vigilance (all French Navy). |
| Charming Kitty | Great Britain | War of the First Coalition: The ship was captured and sunk by a French frigate while on a voyage from Milford Haven, Pembrokeshire to Gibraltar. |
| Christopher | Great Britain | The ship was driven ashore at Port St. Mary, Isle of Man. She was on a voyage from Liverpool, Lancashire to Africa. |
| De Juffrow Hilberdina | Duchy of Holstein | The ship was driven ashore at Great Yarmouth, Norfolk, Great Britain. She was on a voyage from Emden to London, Great Britain. |
| Dolphin | Dutch Republic | The ship was driven ashore on Wangeroog. She was on a voyage from Amsterdam, North Holland to Bremen. |
| Domingo | Great Britain | War of the First Coalition: The ship was destroyed at Sierra Leone by Experiment, Félicité, Mutine, Épervier, and Vigilance (all French Navy). |
| Esther | Great Britain | The ship capsized in the River Avon. She was on a voyage from Barbados, to Bristol, Gloucestershire. |
| Europa | Bremen | The ship was wrecked on the Scharhorn, in the North Sea. She was on a voyage from London to Bremen. |
| Flora | Great Britain | War of the First Coalition: The ship was destroyed at Sierra Leone by Experiment, Félicité, Mutine, Épervier, and Vigilance (all French Navy). |
| Frederick William II | Stettin | The ship was driven ashore and wrecked at Dragør, Denmark. She was on a voyage from Stettin to London. |
| Happy Return | Great Britain | The ship was driven ashore at Drogheda, County Louth, Ireland. |
| Hariel Haar | (Denmark) Norway | The ship sank in the Cattewater. She was on a voyage from "Ivica" to Trondheim. |
| Harpy | Great Britain | War of the First Coalition: The ship was destroyed at Sierra Leone by Experiment, Félicité, Mutine, Épervier, and Vigilance (all French Navy). |
| Hercules | Great Britain | The ship was driven ashore near Karlskrona, Sweden. She was on a voyage from Saint Petersburg, Russia to Dundee, Perthshire. |
| Hope | Great Britain | The ship sank in the River Thames at Gravesend, Kent. She was on a voyage from London to Belfast, County Antrim, Ireland. |
| James | Great Britain | War of the First Coalition: The ship was destroyed at Sierra Leone by Experiment, Félicité, Mutine, Épervier, and Vigilance (all French Navy). |
| Jane | Great Britain | War of the First Coalition: The ship was destroyed at Sierra Leone by Experiment, Félicité, Mutine, Épervier, and Vigilance (all French Navy). |
| Jonge Jacob | Stettin | The ship was driven ashore at Aldeburgh, Suffolk, Great Britain. She was on a voyage from London to Stettin. |
| Margery | Great Britain | War of the First Coalition: The ship was destroyed at Sierra Leone by Experiment, Félicité, Mutine, Épervier, and Vigilance (all French Navy). |
| Maria Frederica | Sweden | The ship was driven ashore and wrecked on the coast of Jutland. She was on a voyage from Stockholm to Ireland. |
| Molly | Great Britain | War of the First Coalition: The ship was destroyed at Sierra Leone by Experiment, Félicité, Mutine, Épervier, and Vigilance (all French Navy). |
| Nancy | Great Britain | War of the First Coalition: The ship was destroyed at Sierra Leone by Experiment, Félicité, Mutine, Épervier, and Vigilance (all French Navy). |
| Prince of Wales | Great Britain | War of the First Coalition: The ship was destroyed at Sierra Leone by Experiment, Félicité, Mutine, Épervier, and Vigilance (all French Navy). |
| Rose | Great Britain | War of the First Coalition: The ship was destroyed at Sierra Leone by Experiment, Félicité, Mutine, Épervier, and Vigilance (all French Navy). |
| Sally | Great Britain | The ship was driven ashore near Holyhead, Anglesey. She was on a voyage from Liverpool to Africa. |
| Sierra Leone Packet | Great Britain | War of the First Coalition: The ship was destroyed at Sierra Leone by Experiment, Félicité, Mutine, Épervier, and Vigilance (all French Navy). |
| Sophia | Great Britain | War of the First Coalition: The ship was destroyed at Sierra Leone by Experiment, Félicité, Mutine, Épervier, and Vigilance (all French Navy). |
| Swift | Great Britain | War of the First Coalition: The ship was destroyed at Sierra Leone by Experiment, Félicité, Mutine, Épervier, and Vigilance (all French Navy). |
| Thornton | Great Britain | War of the First Coalition: The ship was destroyed at Sierra Leone by Experiment, Félicité, Mutine, Épervier, and Vigilance (all French Navy). |
| Venus | Great Britain | War of the First Coalition: The ship was destroyed at Sierra Leone by Experiment, Félicité, Mutine, Épervier, and Vigilance (all French Navy). |
| Young John | Flag unknown | The ship was run down and sunk in the English Channel. Her crew were rescued. She was on a voyage from Bremen to Bordeaux, Gironde, France. |

== October ==
=== 1 October ===
List of shipwrecks: 1 October 1794
| Ship | State | Description |
|---|---|---|
| Lydia | United States | The ship foundered in the Atlantic Ocean. |

=== 4 October ===
List of shipwrecks: 4 October 1794
| Ship | State | Description |
|---|---|---|
| Eva Christina | Flag unknown | The ship departed from Cork, Ireland for St. Ubes, Portugal. No further trace, presumed foundered with the loss of all hands. |
| Henrietta | Great Britain | The cutter was driven ashore in the Isles of Scilly. |

=== 5 October ===
List of shipwrecks: 5 October 1794
| Ship | State | Description |
|---|---|---|
| Charles Kerr | Great Britain | The ship was wrecked at Ramsgate, Kent. She was on a voyage from Grenada to London. |
| Fame | Great Britain | The ship sank off Sandwich, Kent. She was on a voyage from London to Gibraltar. |
| Mary | Great Britain | The brig was driven ashore and wrecked at Ramsgate with the loss of all hands. |
| Restoration | Great Britain | The ship ran aground on the Gunfleet Sand, in the North Sea off the coast of Essex. She was on a voyage from the Firth of Forth to London. |
| Robert & Ann | Great Britain | The ship ran aground on the Gunfleet Sand. She was on a voyage from Arkhangelsk, Russia to Amsterdam, North Holland, Dutch Republic. |
| Sincerity | Great Britain | The ship was driven ashore at Ramsgate. She was on a voyage from London to Dover, Kent. |
| Vreyheid | Dutch Republic | The ship was driven ashore and wrecked at Ramsgate. She was on a voyage from Amsterdam to Narva, Russia. |
| Young Hero | Great Britain | The ship was driven ashore and wrecked near Sandown Castle, Kent. |

=== 8 October ===
List of shipwrecks: 8 October 1794
| Ship | State | Description |
|---|---|---|
| Barymore | Ireland | The ship was abandoned in the Atlantic Ocean. Her crew were rescued by Hawke (Great Britain). Barymore was on a voyage from Cork to Saint John's, British America. |

=== 10 October ===
List of shipwrecks: 10 October 1794
| Ship | State | Description |
|---|---|---|
| Fyodor (Фёдор) | Imperial Russian Navy | The galiot was driven ashore and wrecked in the skerries near Sveaborg in the Gulf of Finland. Her crew were rescued. She was on a voyage from Kronstadt to Reval. |

=== 11 October ===
List of shipwrecks: 11 October 1794
| Ship | State | Description |
|---|---|---|
| George & Betty | Ireland | The ship foundered in the Atlantic Ocean. Her crew were rescued by Abbey (Great Britain). George & Betty was on a voyage from New York, United States to Cork. |
| Ruby | Great Britain | The ship foundered in the Atlantic Ocean. Her crew were rescued by Abbey (Great Britain). Ruby was on a voyage from New York to Cork. |

=== 20 October ===
List of shipwrecks: 20 October 1794
| Ship | State | Description |
|---|---|---|
| Mentor | Great Britain | War of the First Coalition: The ship was captured in the Atlantic Ocean by three French ships and was burnt. |

=== 23 October ===
List of shipwrecks: 23 October 1794
| Ship | State | Description |
|---|---|---|
| Swan | Great Britain | The ship was lost at Anholt, Denmark. Her crew were rescued. She was on a voyage from London to Stettin. |

=== 24 October ===
List of shipwrecks: 24 October 1794
| Ship | State | Description |
|---|---|---|
| Augusta | Great Britain | The ship was destroyed by fire in the Saint Lawrence River. She was on a voyage from Quebec City, Lower Canada, British America to the West Indies. |

=== Unknown date ===
List of shipwrecks: Unknown date in October 1794
| Ship | State | Description |
|---|---|---|
| Adolph | Sweden | The ship was driven ashore on the Dutch coast. She was on a voyage from Stockholm to A Coruña, Spain. |
| Amphitrite | Great Britain | The ship was driven ashore at Southend-on-Sea, Essex. She was on a voyage from Bermuda to London. |
| Aurora | Great Britain | The ship was holed by her anchor and sank in the River Thames. She was on a voyage from Virginia, United States to London. |
| Barbara | Great Britain | The ship was driven ashore and wrecked at Lancaster, Lancashire. She was on a voyage from Jamaica to Lancaster. |
| Caroline | Great Britain | War of the First Coalition: The ship was captured and sunk by a French frigate. She was on a voyage from Liverpool, Lancashire to a Baltic port. |
| Charles | Great Britain | The ship struck a rock and sank near Bergen, Norway with the loss of four of her crew. She was on a voyage from Bristol to Saint Petersburg, Russia. |
| Charlotte Packet | Great Britain | The ship foundered in the English Channel while on a voyage from Southampton, Hampshire to Guernsey, Channel Islands. |
| Countess of Galvez | Great Britain | The ship was driven ashore and wrecked at Shoeburyness, Essex. She was on a voyage from Jamaica to London. |
| Defence | Great Britain | The ship struck a rock and foundered in the Baltic Sea. Her crew were rescued. She was on a voyage from Whitby, Yorkshire to Saint Petersburg. |
| De Vrow Anna Martha | Dutch Republic | War of the First Coalition: The ship was captured and burnt by the French. She was on a voyage from Gallipoli, Ottoman Empire to Rotterdam, South Holland. |
| Guardian | Great Britain | The ship ran aground on the Gunfleet Sand, in the North Sea off the coast of Essex. |
| Henry | Ireland | The ship was driven ashore near Waterford. |
| Hope | Great Britain | The ship was driven ashore in Stokes Bay. She was on a voyage from Saint Petersburg to Plymouth, Devon. |
| Hope | Great Britain | The schooner sprang a leak and was beached in Cádiz Bay. |
| Hope | Great Britain | The ship was driven ashore near Rotterdam, South Holland, Dutch Republic. She was on a voyage from Jamaica to London. |
| Hope | Great Britain | The ship was driven ashore near Ilfracombe, Devon. She was on a voyage from Liverpool to Hamburg. |
| Hope | Great Britain | The schooner sprang a leak and was beached at Málaga, Spain. |
| Hornet | Great Britain | The ship was wrecked on The Owers, in the English Channel off Portsmouth, Hampshire. She was on a voyage from Jamaica to London. |
| Hyacinth | Russia | The ship was lost on Saltholm, Denmark. She was on a voyage from Saint Petersburg to Spain. |
| Industry | Ireland | The sloop was driven ashore at Passage West, County Cork before 20 October. She was on a voyage from Málaga, Spain to Cork. |
| Jonge Anna | Dutch Republic | The ship was driven ashore on the Dutch coast. She was on a voyage from Groningen to London. |
| Mercury Packet | Great Britain | The ship was driven ashore and wrecked on the coast of Calabria, Kingdom of Sicily. |
| Nancy | Great Britain | The ship was wrecked on Gotland, Sweden. She was on a voyage from "Wyberg" to Liverpool. |
| Nelly | Great Britain | The ship was captured by a French frigate while on a voyage from Memel, East Prussia to the River Clyde. She was set afire and sunk. |
| Neva | Great Britain | The ship ran aground on the Gunfleet Sand. |
| Paxutent Planter | United States | The ship was driven ashore near Southend-on-Sea. She was on a voyage from Virginia to London. |
| Pearl | Great Britain | The ship was driven ashore on the coast of Calabria. |
| Rebecca | Great Britain | The ship was driven ashore at Weymouth, Dorset. |
| Sally | Great Britain | The ship collided with Kingston (Great Britain) and foundered in the Gulf of Finland. She was on a voyage from Saint Petersburg to London. |
| Thomas | Great Britain | The ship was driven ashore on the Dutch coast. She was on a voyage from Demerara to a Dutch port. |
| Unite or Unity | Great Britain | War of the First Coalition: The ship was captured by the French while on a voyage from London to a Portuguese port and was sunk. |
| Vrow Elizabeth | Dutch Republic | The ship was driven ashore on the Dutch coast. She was on a voyage from Dort, South Holland to London. |

== November ==
=== 4 November ===
List of shipwrecks: 4 November 1794
| Ship | State | Description |
|---|---|---|
| Prince | Great Britain | The ship was driven ashore in the River Thames at Limehouse, Middlesex. She was on a voyage from London to Africa. |

=== 5 November ===
List of shipwrecks: 5 November 1794
| Ship | State | Description |
|---|---|---|
| Jenny | Great Britain | The ship departed from Liverpool, Lancashire for Africa. No further trace, presumed foundered with the loss of all hands. |
| Neptune | Great Britain | The ship departed from Liverpool for Africa. No further trace, presumed foundered with the loss of all hands. |

=== 11 November ===
List of shipwrecks: 11 November 1794
| Ship | State | Description |
|---|---|---|
| Ioann Bogoslov (Иоанн Богослов, 'John the Apostle') | Imperial Russian Navy | The Pyotr Apostol-class frigate was destroyed by fire at Nikolayev with the loss of twelve of her crew. |
| Polly | Great Britain | The ship foundered in the Atlantic Ocean (42°N 47°W). She was on a voyage from Saint-Domingue to New York, United States and London. |
| William | Great Britain | The full-rigged ship foundered in the Atlantic Ocean (42°N 47°W). |

=== 18 November ===
List of shipwrecks: 18 November 1794
| Ship | State | Description |
|---|---|---|
| Vrow Elizabeth | Hamburg | The ship was run down and sunk 15 leagues (45 nautical miles (83 km)) off Ouessant, Finistère, France by a Danish brig with the loss of nine of her crew. She was on a voyage from Rochefort, Charente-Maritime to Altona, Hamburg. |

=== 20 November ===
List of shipwrecks: 20 November 1794
| Ship | State | Description |
|---|---|---|
| James | Great Britain | The ship was driven ashore and wrecked on the coast of Ireland. She was on a voyage from Liverpool, Lancashire to Jamaica. |
| Surprize | Great Britain | The ship was driven ashore and wrecked on the coast of Ireland. She was on a voyage from Liverpool to Africa. |

=== 21 November ===
List of shipwrecks: 21 November 1794
| Ship | State | Description |
|---|---|---|
| Experiment | Great Britain | The ship struck the North Rock, Ireland and foundered. Her crew were rescued. She was on a voyage from Maryport, Cumberland to Belfast, County Antrim, Ireland. |

=== 25 November ===
List of shipwrecks: 25 November 1794
| Ship | State | Description |
|---|---|---|
| Planter | Great Britain | The ship collided with HMS Chichester ( (Kingdom of Great Britain) Royal Navy) in the Atlantic Ocean and was abandoned. She was on a voyage from Jamaica to London. |

=== 26 November ===
List of shipwrecks: 26 November 1794
| Ship | State | Description |
|---|---|---|
| HMS Actif | (Kingdom of Great Britain) Royal Navy | The Sloop-of-War foundered in the Atlantic Ocean (30°09′N 76°58′W). Her crew were rescued by HMS St Albans ( (Kingdom of Great Britain) Royal Navy). |
| Unnamed | (Kingdom of Great Britain) Royal Navy | The 16-gun frigate was shipwrecked by a gust of wind at one of the northern isles of Shetland. Her captain and crew escaped. |

=== 28 November ===
List of shipwrecks: 28 November 1794
| Ship | State | Description |
|---|---|---|
| Bridget | Great Britain | The ship was lost at Cape Chat, Lower Canada, British America. Her crew were rescued. She was on a voyage from Quebec City, Lower Canada to London. |

=== Unknown date ===
List of shipwrecks: Unknown date in November 1794
| Ship | State | Description |
|---|---|---|
| Amity's Increase | Great Britain | The ship was driven ashore at Burlington, Yorkshire. Her crew were rescued. She was on a voyage from Liverpool, Lancashire to Hamburg. |
| Arno | Ireland | War of the First Coalition: The ship was captured by a squadron of French Navy frigates and was sunk ten days later. She was on a voyage from St. Ubes, Portugal to Ireland. |
| Apollo | Great Britain | The ship was driven ashore at Great Yarmouth, Norfolk. |
| Bonne Resolution | Danzig | War of the First Coalition: The ship was captured and burnt. She was on a voyage from Ireland to Danzig. |
| Dispatch | Great Britain | The ship was lost at Dungarvan, County Antrim, Ireland. She was on a voyage from Cádiz, Spain to Bristol, Gloucestershire. |
| Earl of Tyronne | Ireland | The ship was wrecked near Wexford with the loss of all but one of those on board. She was on a voyage from London to Dublin. |
| Eldest Daughter | Great Britain | The ship was driven ashore and wrecked near Wexford. She was on a voyage from Bristol to Danzig. |
| Elizabeth | Great Britain | The ship was lost near Milford, Pembrokeshire. She was on a voyage from Bristol to Portsmouth, Hampshire. |
| Emanuel | Dutch Republic | The ship was driven ashore at Broadstairs, Kent. She was on a voyage from Mogadore, Morocco to Amsterdam, North Holland. |
| Endeavour | Great Britain | The ship was wrecked on the Isle of Man. Her crew were rescued. She was on a voyage from Liverpool to Limerick, Ireland. |
| Fanny | Great Britain | The ship was driven ashore at Great Yarmouth. |
| Fly | Great Britain | The ship was driven ashore in Mount's Bay. She was on a voyage from Málaga, Spain to Greenock, Renfrewshire. |
| Friendship | Great Britain | The ship foundered in the Bay of Biscay off St. Lucar, Spain. Her crew were rescued. She was on a voyage from Quebec City, Lower Canada, British America to Cádiz. |
| General Clark | Great Britain | The ship was driven ashore and wrecked at Brook Chine, Isle of Wight with the loss of two of her crew. |
| Gerbrand and Cornelius | Dutch Republic | The ship was wrecked on the Dutch coast. She was on a voyage from London, Great Britain to Rotterdam, South Holland. |
| Gustaff Adolph | Hamburg | The ship was driven ashore at Bray, County Wicklow, Ireland with the loss of two of her crew. She was on a voyage from Liverpool to Hamburg. |
| Hanss | Hamburg | The ship was driven ashore and wrecked near Aldeburgh, Suffolk, Great Britain. She was on a voyage from Hamburg to London. |
| Isabella | Great Britain | The ship was wrecked on the coast of Ireland. She was on a voyage from Liverpool to Drogheda, County Louth, Ireland. |
| Johanna Susanna | Sweden | The ship was driven ashore at Pakefield, Suffolk. She was on a voyage from "Warberg" to Lisbon, Portugal. |
| John | Great Britain | The ship foundered in the North Sea off Lowestoft, Suffolk. She was on a voyage from Berwick upon Tweed to London. |
| Juffrow Adethist | Bremen | The ship was wrecked on the Dutch coast. She was on a voyage from London to Bremen. |
| Kite | Great Britain | The ship was wrecked at Skagen, Denmark. She was on a voyage from Danzig to Newcastle upon Tyne, Northumberland. |
| Maria Christiana | Sweden | The ship was lost near Mandahl, Norway. She was on a voyage from Stockholm to Plymouth, Devon, Great Britain. |
| Mary | Great Britain | The ship was lost near Kinsale, County Cork, Ireland before 29 November. Her crew were rescued. She was on a voyage from Bideford, Devon to Cork. |
| Mary | Great Britain | The ship was driven ashore near Ramsgate. She was on a voyage from London to Jamaica. |
| Mercator | Great Britain | The ship foundered off Dublin. She was on a voyage from Liverpool to Boston, Massachusetts, United States. |
| Molly | Great Britain | The ship was driven ashore at Strangford, County Down, Ireland. She was on a voyage from Liverpool to the Western Islands. |
| Neriad | Great Britain | The ship was driven ashore in the River Thames at Cuckold's Point, Surrey. She was on a voyage from the Strait of Gibraltar to London. |
| Neutralitat | Lübeck | The ship foundered in the Baltic Sea. She was on a voyage from Liverpool to Lübeck. |
| New Ceres | Great Britain | The ship was wrecked at Malahide, County Dublin. She was on a voyage from Lisbon to Liverpool. |
| New Hope | Great Britain | The ship foundered in the North Sea. She was on a voyage from Stettin to London. |
| Quatro Amigos | Spain | The ship was driven ashore at San Vicente de la Barquera. She was on a voyage from St. Andero to Bristol. |
| Rose | Great Britain | The ship was driven ashore at Larne, County Antrim. She was on a voyage from Liverpool to Bremen. |
| Sophia Dorothea | Hamburg | The hoy was driven ashore near Aldeburgh. She was on a voyage from Hamburg to Bordeaux, Gironde, France. |
| Sophia Elizabeth | (Denmark) Norway | The ship was driven ashore at Aldeburg. She was on a voyage from Moss to Le Havre, Seine-Inférieure, France. |
| Southampton | Great Britain | The ship was driven ashore in Plymouth Sound. |
| Speedwell | Great Britain | The ship foundered in the Irish Sea. Presumed all hands lost. |
| St. Andreas | Spain | The ship was driven ashore near Great Yarmouth. She was on a voyage from Copenhagen, Denmark to Bilbao. |
| St Antonio | Dutch Republic | The ship was driven ashore and wrecked on Texel, North Holland. She was on a voyage from Arkhangelsk to a Dutch port. |
| Swift | Great Britain | The ship was driven ashore at Plymouth. She was on a voyage from London to the West Indies. |
| Temple | Great Britain | The ship was driven ashore and wrecked near Leith, Lothian. She was on a voyage from Leith to Hamburg. |
| Theresa | Dutch Republic | The ship was driven ashore at Aldeburgh. She was on a voyage from a port in Friesland to London. |
| Union | United States | The ship was wrecked on the Goodwin Sands, Kent, Great Britain. Her crew were rescued. She was on a voyage from Amsterdam to Virginia. |
| Union | Great Britain | The ship was driven ashore near Portaferry, County Down. She was on a voyage from London to Liverpool. |
| Venus | Great Britain | The ship was driven ashore at St. Ives, Cornwall. She was on a voyage from Málaga to Falmouth, Cornwall. |
| Vrow Elizabeth | Great Britain | The ship was driven ashore and wrecked on Texel. She was on a voyage from Arkhangelsk to a Dutch port. |
| Vrow Jacobina | Dutch Republic | The ship was driven ashore on the coast of Suffolk. She was on a voyage from Groningen to London. |
| Wildman | Great Britain | The ship was driven ashore at Ramsgate, where she was destroyed by fire. She was on a voyage from London to Jamaica. |
| Unnamed | Flag unknown | The ship was lost off Bermuda. She was on a voyage from Madeira to Baltimore, Maryland, United States. |

== December ==
=== 6 December ===
List of shipwrecks: 6 December 1794
| Ship | State | Description |
|---|---|---|
| Success | Great Britain | The ship was wrecked on Skye. She was on a voyage from Norway to Cork, Ireland |

=== 7 December ===
List of shipwrecks: 7 December 1794
| Ship | State | Description |
|---|---|---|
| Lady Penrhyn | Great Britain | War of the First Coalition: The ship was driven ashore at "Papaw", Africa by a squadron of French ships. |

=== 8 December ===
List of shipwrecks: 8 December 1794
| Ship | State | Description |
|---|---|---|
| Happy Return | Ireland | The ship departed from Dublin for Cádiz, Spain. No further trace, presumed foundered with the loss of all hands. |

=== 16 December ===
List of shipwrecks: 16 December 1794
| Ship | State | Description |
|---|---|---|
| Three Brothers | Great Britain | The sloop ran aground and sank in the North Sea south off Coquet Island, Northumberland. Her crew survived. |
| Pandora | Great Britain | The ship departed from Gibraltar for London. No further trace, presumed foundered with the loss of all hands. |

=== 21 December ===
List of shipwrecks: 21 December 1794
| Ship | State | Description |
|---|---|---|
| Mary | Great Britain | The ship foundered in the Irish Sea off Cork, Ireland with the loss of all hands. She was on a voyage from Cork to London. |

=== 23 December ===
List of shipwrecks: 23 December 1794
| Ship | State | Description |
|---|---|---|
| Hall | Great Britain | The ship was driven ashore at Pakefield, Suffolk and was wrecked. |
| Hope | Great Britain | The ship struck a sandbank in the North Sea and was abandoned by her crew. All except one of her eleven crew were drowned trying to reach shore. |
| John and Margaret | Great Britain | The ship was driven ashore at Corton, Suffolk and was wrecked. |
| Magdalena | Sweden | The brigantine was wrecked on the east coast of Mainland, Orkney, Great Britain with the loss of two of her crew. She was on a voyage from Gothenburg to Liverpool, Lancashire, Great Britain. |
| Union | Great Britain | The ship was driven ashore at Hopton-on-Sea, Norfolk and was wrecked. |
| Three unnamed vessels | Flags unknown | The ships were driven ashore near Great Yarmouth, Norfolk. |

=== 24 December ===
List of shipwrecks: 24 December 1794
| Ship | State | Description |
|---|---|---|
| Républicain | French Navy | Républicain. The ship of the line ran aground off Brest, Finistère with the loss of ten of her crew. She was destroyed by a storm a few days later. |
| Unnamed | Great Britain | The ship foundered at Great Yarmouth, Norfolk with the loss of all five crew. |

=== 27 December ===
List of shipwrecks: 27 December 1794
| Ship | State | Description |
|---|---|---|
| São José Paquete Africa | Portugal | African slave trade: The slave ship sank during bad weather 100 metres (330 ft) off Cape Town, while on a voyage from Mozambique to Brazil. |

=== Unknown date ===
List of shipwrecks: Unknown date in December 1794
| Ship | State | Description |
|---|---|---|
| Alexander | Great Britain | The ship was driven ashore and wrecked near Montrose, Forfarshire with the loss of all hands. |
| HMS Apollo | Royal Navy | The Artois-class frigate ran aground on the Lemon and Ower Sand, in the North Sea off the coast of Norfolk. She was refloated and taken in to Great Yarmouth, Norfolk. |
| Aurora | Great Britain | The ship was lost near the Saltee Islands, Spain. She was on a voyage from Málaga, Spain to Liverpool, Lancashire. |
| Bacchus | (Denmark) Norway | The ship was lost near Deerness, Orkney Islands, Great Britain with the loss of all but two of her crew. |
| Beautiful Mary | Great Britain | The ship was lost on the Arklow Banks, in the Irish Sea off County Wicklow, Ireland. She was on a voyage from Dungarvan, County Antrim, Ireland to Bristol, Gloucestershire. |
| Botton | Ireland | The ship was driven ashore on the Isle of Wight, Great Britain. She was on a voyage from Waterford to Newhaven, Sussex, Great Britain. |
| Cornelius | Dutch Republic | The ship was lost on the coast of Holstein with the loss of five of her crew. She was on a voyage from Amsterdam, North Holland to Hamburg. |
| Countess of Finlater | Great Britain | The ship foundered in the North Sea 18 nautical miles (33 km) north of Aberdeen while on a voyage from London to Banff, Aberdeenshire. |
| Delight | Great Britain | The ship was driven ashore in Robin Hoods Bay, Yorkshire. Her crew were rescued. She was on a voyage from Hamburg to Lisbon. |
| Diana | Great Britain | War of the First Coalition: The ship was captured by the French in the North Channel and was sunk. She was on a voyage from Martinique to Lancaster, Lancashire. |
| Dispatch | Great Britain | The ship was run down and sunk in the North Sea off Whitstable, Kent. |
| Earl of Surry | Great Britain | The ship was wrecked on the coast of Jutland. She was on a voyage from London to Hamburg. |
| Eliza | Great Britain | The ship was driven ashore at Crookhaven, County Cork, Ireland. |
| Enterprize | Great Britain | The ship was lost on the coast of Ireland. She was on a voyage from Ipswich, Suffolk to Liverpool, Lancashire. |
| Falmouth | Great Britain | The ship was driven ashore off Saint Tudwal's Islands, Pembrokeshire. She was on a voyage from Jamaica to Halifax, Nova Scotia, British America and Belfast, County Antrim, Ireland. |
| Fox | Great Britain | The ship foundered in the North Sea off Great Yarmouth, Norfolk. |
| George | Great Britain | The ship was lost off Great Yarmouth. She was on a voyage from Lisbon, Portugal to Leith, Lothian. |
| George | Great Britain | The ship ran aground on the Knock Sand in the North Sea and was wrecked. |
| Graff Bernstorff | Flag unknown | The ship was driven ashore near Great Yarmouth. |
| Hannibal | Great Britain | The ship was lost on the coast of Sardinia. |
| Happy Return | Great Britain | The ship was driven ashore at Pool, Dorset. She was on a voyage from Falmouth, Cornwall to Newhaven. |
| Hibernia | Ireland | The ship was destroyed by fire at Schiedam, South Holland, Dutch Republic. She was on a voyage from Maryland, United States to Rotterdam, South Holland. |
| Hope | Great Britain | The ship was lost at Penzance, Cornwall. She was on a voyage from Penzance to Naples, Kingdom of Sicily. |
| Hope | Ireland | The ship was driven ashore near Ballycastle, County Antrim. She was on a voyage from Alicante, Spain to Newry, County Antrim. |
| Hope | Great Britain | The ship foundered with the loss of ten of her eleven crew. |
| James | Great Britain | The ship was captured by a French frigate and was sunk. She was on a voyage from Porto, Portugal to Limerick. |
| Jane | Great Britain | The ship foundered off the Shetland Islands. She was on a voyage from Saint Petersburg to Liverpool. |
| John | Ireland | The ship was lost near Deerness. She was on a voyage from Saint Petersburg, Russia to Dublin. |
| John and Michael | Ireland | The ship was lost at Solva, Pembrokeshire, Great Britain. She was on a voyage from Dungarvan to Bristol. |
| Lady Jane | Great Britain | The ship ran aground on the Longsand, in the North Sea off the coast of Essex. She was on a voyage from Danzig to London. |
| Leopard | Great Britain | The ship was lost near Westport, County Mayo, Ireland. She was on a voyage from London to Galway, Ireland. |
| Liberty | Ireland | The ship was lost in Dingle Bay. Her crew were rescued. She was on a voyage from St. Ubes, Portugal to Cork. |
| Lovely Martha | Great Britain | The ship was driven ashore at Barry Island, Glamorgan. She was on a voyage from Bristol to Cork. |
| Mary | Great Britain | The ship was driven ashore and wrecked at Waterford. She was on a voyage from London to Waterford. |
| Merchant | Great Britain | The ship foundered in the Firth of Forth. She was on a voyage from Memel, Prussia to Southampton, Hampshire. |
| Mermaid | Great Britain | The ship foundered in Tor Bay. She was on a voyage from Porto to Southampton. |
| Minerva | Great Britain | The ship was lost near Blyth, Northumberland. She was on a voyage from London to Aberdeen. |
| Moll | Ireland | The ship was wrecked on the Isle of Man. Her crew were rescued. She was on a voyage from Newry to Liverpool. |
| Morning Star | United States | The ship was wrecked on Heligoland. She was on a voyage from Philadelphia, Pennsylvania, to Hamburg. |
| Nancy | Great Britain | The ship foundered in the Irish Sea off the Old Head of Kinsale, County Cork. |
| Nassau | Great Britain | War of the First Coalition: The ship was captured by a squadron of French ships at Bonny and burned. |
| Nathaniel and Mary | Great Britain | The ship was driven ashore and wrecked near Montrose. |
| Nostra Señora del Rosario | Spain | The brig foundered in Tor Bay. |
| Parsley | Great Britain | The ship foundered in the North Sea. She was on a voyage from Carron, Stirlingshire to London. |
| Peggy | Great Britain | The ship was lost near Peterhead, Aberdeenshire. She was on a voyage from Gothenburg, Sweden to Dundee, Perthshire. |
| Peggy | Great Britain | The ship was lost at Sandhammer, Norway. |
| Perseverance | Great Britain | The ship was lost near Wicklow, Ireland. She was on a voyage from Liverpool to Tingmouth, Devon. |
| Prince of Wales | Great Britain | The ship was driven ashore near Kidwelly, Pembrokeshire. She was on a voyage from Seville, Spain to London. |
| Prince of Wales | Great Britain | The ship was driven ashore at "Port Bar". |
| Rawlinson | Great Britain | The ship was driven ashore on the Isle of Man. She was on a voyage from Lancaster to the West Indies. |
| Speedwell | Great Britain | The ship was driven ashore on the Isle of Man. She was on a voyage from New Providence, New Jersey, United States to Liverpool. |
| Speightstown | Great Britain | The ship was wrecked in the Orkney Islands. Her crew were rescued. |
| Three Brothers | Great Britain | The ship struck a sunken wreck and foundered. She was on a voyage from Looe, Cornwall to Naples. |
| Trial | Great Britain | The ship foundered in the North Sea off Pakefield, Suffolk. Her crew were rescued. |
| Two Friends | Ireland | The sloop was scuttled at Cork. |
| Venus | Great Britain | The ship was lost near Arklow, County Wicklow. She was on a voyage from Liverpool to Tingmouth. |
| Two unnamed vessels | Flags unknown | A brig and a sloop were wrecked on the north coast of Ireland in early December. |

== Unknown date ==
List of shipwrecks: Unknown date in 1794
| Ship | State | Description |
|---|---|---|
| Active | Great Britain | The ship was driven ashore and wrecked on the Cat Cays, Bahamas. She was on a voyage from Jamaica to London. |
| Adventure | Great Britain | War of the First Coalition: The ship was captured and destroyed in the Grand Banks of Newfoundland by a squadron of French corvettes and frigates. |
| Adventure Baptista | Flag unknown | The sloop was lost on a reef off Curaçao. |
| Alexander | India | The ship was lost near Bombay. |
| Ann | Great Britain | War of the First Coalition: The ship was captured and destroyed in the Grand Banks of Newfoundland by a squadron of French corvettes and frigates. |
| Ailla Margarita (Аилла Маргарита) | Imperial Russian Navy | The transport ship ran aground on a reef and was beached on sv:Suurikari in the Gulf of Finland. Her crew were rescued. Also mentioned as Anna-Margarita (Анна-Маргарита). |
| Ann and Eliza | Great Britain | War of the First Coalition: The ship was captured and burnt in the Grand Banks of Newfoundland by Chevrant, Filibustier and Sémillante (all French Navy). She was on a voyage from Newfoundland, British America to the West Indies. |
| Boddam | India | The ship was reported lost near Bombay. |
| Bristol | Great Britain | War of the First Coalition: The ship was captured and burnt in the Grand Banks of Newfoundland by Chevrant, Filibustier and Sémillante (all French Navy). She was on a voyage from Tobago to London. |
| Britannia | Great Britain | The transport ship was destroyed by fire at Guadeloupe. |
| Brothers | Great Britain | War of the First Coalition: The ship was captured and burnt in the Grand Banks of Newfoundland by Chevrant, Filibustier and Sémillante (all French Navy). She was on a voyage from Newfoundland to Bilbao, Spain. |
| Calcutta | Great Britain | The ship was wrecked on Allwood's Keys. She was on a voyage from New York, United States to Havana, Cuba. |
| Calcutta | United States | The ship was wrecked in the Bahamas. She was on a voyage from New York to Savannah, Georgia. |
| Catharine | Great Britain | The ship was lost at St. John's, Newfoundland. |
| Chance | Great Britain | War of the First Coalition: The ship was captured and burnt in the Grand Banks of Newfoundland by Chevrant, Filibustier and Sémillante (all French Navy). She was on a voyage from Newfoundland to Lisbon, Portugal. |
| Charlotte | Great Britain | The ship was lost at Labrador, British America. |
| Christopher | Great Britain | The ship sank at St. Croix. |
| Commerce | Great Britain | The ship was lost off Cape St. Mary's, Newfoundland. Her crew were rescued. She was on a voyage from Jamaica to Liverpool, Lancashire. |
| Echo | Great Britain | The ship was lost in the Gulf of Florida. She was on a voyage from Jamaica to New York |
| Edward | Great Britain | The whaler was wrecked in the Bay of Nancora, Viceroyalty of Peru. Her crew were rescued. She was on a voyage from the South Seas to London. |
| Eliza | United States | The ship was wrecked on the Crooked Island Reef. She was on a voyage from New Providence, New Jersey to Saint-Domingue. |
| Elizabeth | Great Britain | The ship foundered in the Atlantic Ocean. Her crew were rescued by Hero (Great Britain). She was on a voyage from Grenada to London. |
| Experiment of Leith | Skärgårdsflottan | The catamaran was sunk at Skeppsholmen as part of foundations for a bridge. |
| Fame | Ireland | The ship was captured by Syren (French Navy) between Martinique and Jamaica. The vessels were then engaged by HMS Chichester and HMS Intrepid (both (Kingdom of Great Britain) Royal Navy). Fame was driven ashore and burnt. She had been on a voyage from Cork to Jamaica. Syren was captured and taken in to Jamaica. |
| Fanny | United States | The ship foundered in the Atlantic Ocean off Martha's Vineyard, Massachusetts. |
| Fly | (Kingdom of Great Britain) British America | The schooner was wrecked on the north coast of Bermuda. She was on a voyage from Newfoundland to Barbados. |
| Friends | Great Britain | War of the First Coalition: Captain Cockerel's ship was captured and destroyed in the Grand Banks of Newfoundland by a squadron of French corvettes and frigates. |
| Friends | Great Britain | War of the First Coalition: The Dartmouth ship was captured and destroyed in the Grand Banks of Newfoundland by a squadron of French corvettes and frigates. |
| Generous Friends | Great Britain | The transport ship was lost at Martinique. |
| Grenada Packet | Great Britain | The ship, a prize of L'Amie Point Petre (France), was burnt at Savannah. |
| Hector | (Kingdom of Great Britain) Dominica | The crewless brig was discovered on the coast of Newfoundland, British America. She was taken in to Saint John's, Newfoundland. |
| Henry and Charles | Great Britain | War of the First Coalition: The ship was captured and burnt in the Grand Banks of Newfoundland by Chevrant, Filibustier and Sémillante (all French Navy). She was on a voyage from Chaleur Bay to Bilbao. |
| Hope | Great Britain | The ship was lost at British Honduras. She was on a voyage from Jamaica to British Honduras and London. |
| Hope | Great Britain | War of the First Coalition: Captain Lovey's ship was captured and destroyed in the Grand Banks of Newfoundland by a squadron of French corvettes and frigates. |
| Hope | Great Britain | War of the First Coalition: The Greenock ship was captured and destroyed in the Grand Banks of Newfoundland by a squadron of French corvettes and frigates. |
| Hampshire | Great Britain | The ship was lost at Dio Gracia, British Honduras. Her crew were rescued. |
| Harmony | United States | The ship was abandoned in the Atlantic Ocean off the Delaware Capes. She was on a voyage from Philadelphia to Lisbon. |
| Harriot | United States | The brig was wrecked on the south coast of Bermuda. She was on a voyage from Madeira to Philadelphia, Pennsylvania. |
| Industry | Great Britain | The ship foundered whilst on a voyage from Pool, Dorset to Newfoundland. Her crew were rescued by HMS Boston ( (Kingdom of Great Britain) Royal Navy). |
| Jane | Great Britain | War of the First Coalition: The ship was captured and destroyed in the Grand Banks of Newfoundland by a squadron of French corvettes and frigates. |
| Jesuit | Dutch Republic | War of the First Coalition The ship was captured and recaptured twice and then sank. Her crew were rescued. She was on a voyage from Amsterdam, North Holland to the West Indies. |
| John | United States | The sloop was lost at Martinique. |
| Kingston | Great Britain | The ship was wrecked on the Cabbin Rocks, off Barbados. |
| Kledersthus Cornelius | Dutch Republic | War of the First Coalition: The ship was captured and burnt in the Grand Banks of Newfoundland by Chevrant, Filibustier and Sémillante (all French Navy). She was on a voyage from Demerara to Amsterdam, North Holland. |
| Liberty | Great Britain | War of the First Coalition: The ship exploded and sank during an engagement with a French privateer off "Cape Clare". Her crew were rescued. She was on a voyage from Grenada to Lancaster, Lancashire. |
| Lively | Great Britain | War of the First Coalition: The ship was captured and sunk by the French. She was on a voyage from San Sebastián, Spain to Newfoundland. |
| Lively | United States | The ship foundered off the mouth of the Delaware River. She was on a voyage from Amsterdam to New York. |
| Liverpool Hero | Great Britain | The ship was lost at "Papo", Africa. She was on a voyage from Africa to the West Indies. |
| Lovel | Great Britain | War of the First Coalition: The ship was captured and burnt in the Grand Banks of Newfoundland by Chevrant, Filibustier and Sémillante (all French Navy). She was on a voyage from Newfoundland to Porto, Portugal. |
| Loyal Ann | Great Britain | War of the First Coalition: The ship was captured and burnt in the Grand Banks of Newfoundland by Chevrant, Filibustier and Sémillante (all French Navy). She was on a voyage from Newfoundland to Lisbon. |
| Maria | Great Britain | The ship was lost in the Cayman Islands. She was on a voyage from Jamaica to Liverpool. |
| Marquis of Lorn | Great Britain | The ship was lost in the Saint Lawrence River. She was on a voyage from Madeira to Quebec City, Lower Canada, British America. |
| Mary | Great Britain | The ship was lost in Grenville Bay. She was on a voyage from Grenada to London. |
| Mary Ann | Great Britain | The ship was lost whilst on a voyage from Dartmouth, Devon to Newfoundland. |
| Nancy | Great Britain | The ship foundered in the Atlantic Ocean. She was on a voyage from London to Virginia. |
| Neptune | India | The ship was lost near Bombay. |
| Niccols | Great Britain | The ship was run down and sunk off Martinique by a Man-of-War. Her crew were rescued. She was on a voyage from St. Lucia to London. |
| Noddy | Great Britain | War of the First Coalition: The ship was captured and destroyed in the Grand Banks of Newfoundland by a squadron of French corvettes and frigates. |
| Pallas | Great Britain | The transport ship was destroyed by fire in the Atlantic Ocean. She was on a voyage from Jamaica to London. |
| Patrick | Great Britain | War of the First Coalition: The ship was captured and destroyed in the Grand Banks of Newfoundland by a squadron of French corvettes and frigates. |
| Peggy | Great Britain | The ship was lost in the Davis Strait. |
| Pleasant Hill | Great Britain | War of the First Coalition: The ship was captured and burnt in the Grand Banks of Newfoundland by Chevrant, Filibustier and Sémillante (all French Navy). She was on a voyage from Newfoundland to Livorno, Grand Duchy of Tuscany. |
| Polly | Great Britain | The ship was lost at Labrador. |
| Polly and Charlotte | Great Britain | The ship was lost at British Honduras. She was on a voyage from British Honduras to London. |
| Porcupine | Great Britain | The ship was lost on the coast of Africa. |
| Raith | Great Britain | War of the First Coalition: The ship was captured and burnt by the French. She was on a voyage from the Firth of Forth to Quebec. |
| Ranger | Great Britain | The ship was wrecked on St. John's Island, British America. |
| Sally | Great Britain | The brig was wrecked on the north coast of Bermuda with the loss of two of her crew. She was on a voyage from Havana, Cuba to Newfoundland. |
| Sally | Great Britain | War of the First Coalition: The ship was captured and destroyed in the Grand Banks of Newfoundland by a squadron of French corvettes and frigates. |
| Sampson | Great Britain | The ship was lost in Cow Bay. She was on a voyage from Jamaica to Saint-Domingue and London. |
| Sophia | Great Britain | The ship was wrecked on the coast of Cuba. All seventeen people on board were rescued. She was on a voyage from Jamaica to London. |
| St Francisco de Paula Castellina | Republic of Genoa | The ship was wrecked at Little Egg Harbour, New Jersey, United States. She was on a voyage from Nantes, Loire-Inférieure, France to New York. |
| Three Sisters | Great Britain | War of the First Coalition: The ship was captured and burnt ij the Grand Banks of Newfoundland by Chevrant, Filibustier and Sémillante (all French Navy). She was on a voyage from Jamaica to London. |
| Unity | Great Britain | War of the First Coalition: The ship was captured and destroyed in the Grand Banks of Newfoundland by a squadron of French corvettes and frigates. |
| Vogelstein | Dutch Republic | The ship was lost in the West Indies. She was on a voyage from Surinam to Amsterdam. |
| Wakamiya Maru | Tokugawa Shogunate | The vessel was broken up by waves in Unalga Pass off Biorka Island in Russian Alaska. Russians transported 15 survivors to Unalaska and then to Okhotsk in the Russian Empire. |
| William | Great Britain | War of the First Coalition: The ship was captured and burnt in the Grand Banks of Newfoundland by Chevrant, Filibustier and Sémillante (all French Navy). She was on a voyage from Jamaica to London. |
| William & Agnes | Great Britain | War of the First Coalition: The ship was captured and destroyed in the Grand Banks of Newfoundland by a squadron of French corvettes and frigates. |
| Winterton | British East India Company | The East Indiaman was wrecked on the coast of Madagascar. Her crew survived. |
| York | Great Britain | The stores ship was destroyed by fire in Sierra Leone. |
