= Molly (1783 ship) =

British merchantman and slave ship (1783–1794)

History

Great Britain
- Name: Molly
- Launched: 1783, Halifax, Nova Scotia
- Captured: 1794

General characteristics
- Tons burthen: 80, or 96, or 107, or 144 (bm)
- Armament: 10 × 4-pounder guns (1793)

Molly was launched at Halifax, Nova Scotia, in 1783. From at least 1785 on she sailed from Lancaster as a West Indiaman. In 1792 she made one voyage as a Liverpool-based slave ship in the triangular trade in enslaved people. A French squadron captured her in 1794 at the outset of her second slave voyage, before she could acquire any slaves.

== Career ==
Missing online issues of Lloyd's Register (LR) mean that Molly first appeared in the register in 1786, even though she had already appeared in Lloyd's List in 1785. For many years Lloyd's Register gave her origin as simply "Amer", though by the early 1790s it had switched to "Halifax".

Year	Master	Owner	Trade	Source & notes
1789	Greenwood; Nunns	J.Jackson	Lancaster–St Kitts	LR; raised and repaired 1785
1791	J.Nunns; Boswell	J.Jackson	Lancaster–St Kitts	LR; raised and repaired 1785, repaired 1788 & 1790
1792	Bosworth; J.Coulthard	Jackson & Co. Fisher & Co.	Lancaster–St Kitts; Liverpool–Africa	LR; raised and repaired 1785, repaired 1788 & 1790

1st voyage transporting enslaved people (1792–1793): Captain John Coulthard sailed from Liverpool on 28 September 1792, bound for West Africa. This was his first voyage as a captain. Unfortunately for him, he died on 27 February 1793. Captain Nehemiah Evans replaced Coulthard. Molly arrived at Kingston on 25 May 1793 with 134 captives. She sailed for Liverpool on 19 July and arrived back there on 2 October. She had left Liverpool with 19 crew members and she had suffered 11 crew deaths on her voyage.

Year	Master	Owner	Trade	Source & notes
1793	J.Coulthard	Fisher & Co.	Liverpool–Africa	LR; raised and repaired 1785, repaired 1788 & 1790
1794	J.Sellars	R.Fisher	Liverpool–Africa	LR; raised and repaired 1785, repaired 1788 & 1790
1794	J.Sellars	R.Fisher	Liverpool–Africa	LR; raised and repaired 1785, repaired 1788, 1790, & 1794

2nd voyage transporting enslaved people (1794–Loss): Captain John Sillars sailed from Liverpool on 5 July 1794.

== Fate ==
In September 1794 a French naval squadron comprising the razee Experiment under the command of lieutenant de vaisseau Arnaud, Vigilance, Félicité, Épervier, and Mutine was cruising the West African coast, destroying British factories and shipping. Among many other vessels, they captured two vessels belonging to the Sierra Leone Company, Harpy, and Thornton, and Molly, Sellers, master.

In 1794, 25 British vessels engaged in the triangular trade in enslaved people were lost. At least three were lost on the coast of Africa. During the period 1793 to 1807, war, rather than maritime hazards or resistance by the captives, was the greatest cause of vessel losses among British enslaving vessels.
