= Dutch corvette Waakzaamheid (1786) =

Corvette

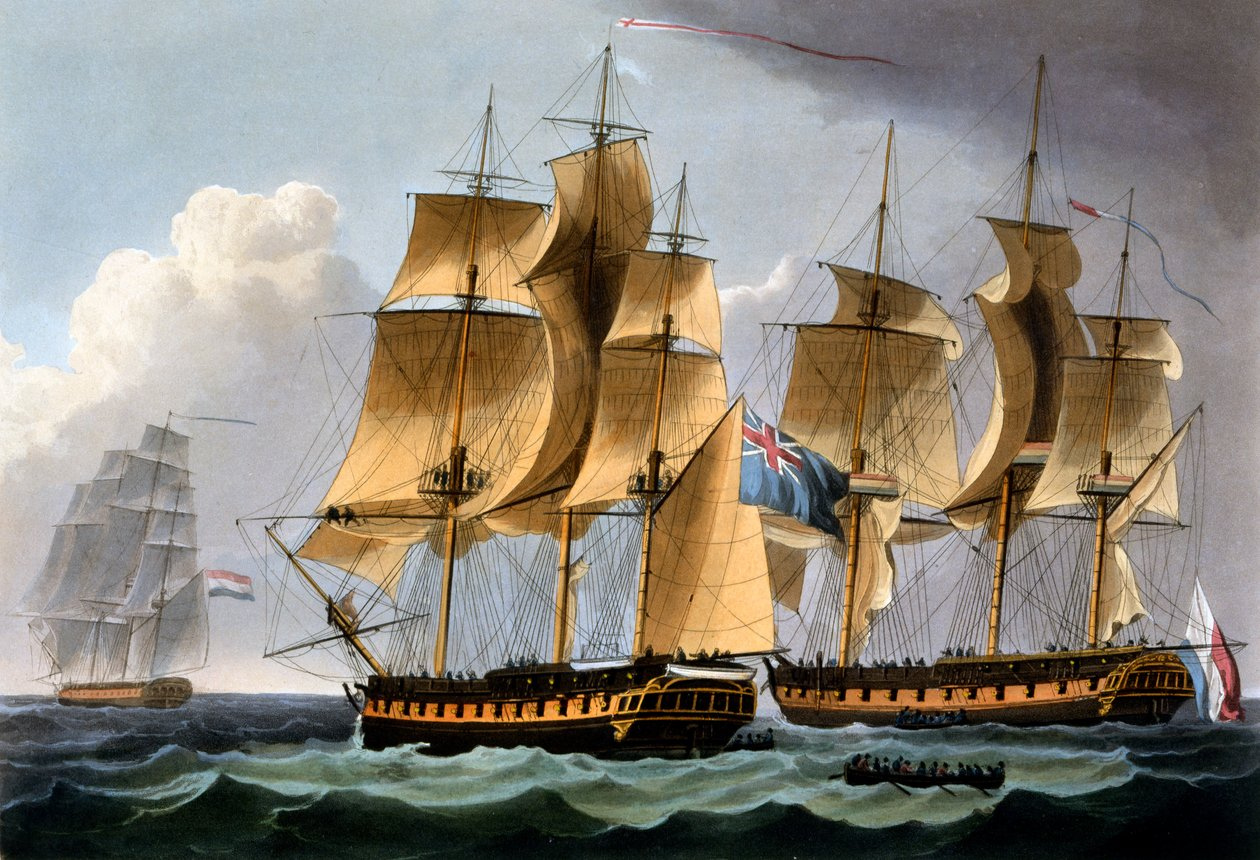
- Waakzaamheid (first from right) at the action of 24 October 1798

History

Dutch Republic
- Operator: Admiralty of the Noorderkwartier
- Builder: J. Hand, Enkhuizen
- Launched: 1786
- Captured: 23 May 1794

France
- Name: Vigilance
- Acquired: 23 May 1794 by capture
- Fate: Sold 1795

Batavian Republic
- Name: Waazaamheid
- Acquired: 1795 by purchase
- Captured: 24 October 1798

Great Britain
- Name: HMS Waaksaamheidt
- Acquired: 24 October 1798 by capture
- Fate: Sold September 1802

General characteristics
- Class & type: Dutch: 7th charter (corvette); Royal Navy: Post ship
- Displacement: 360 tons unladen, & 680 tons laden
- Tons burthen: 50384/94, or 504 (bm)
- Length: Dutch: 1243/11 (Amsterdam foot & inches) (Note: All linear measurements are in Amsterdam feet (voet) of 11 Amsterdam inches (duim) (see Dutch units of measurement). The Amsterdam foot is about 8% shorter than an English foot. The basis of measurement is also different.); English: Overall: 114 ft 6 in (34.9 m); Keel: 94 ft 8 5/8 in (28.9 m)
- Beam: Dutch: 33 voet 3/11 duim; English: 31 ft 7 1/2 in (9.6 m)
- Depth: 12 9/11 voet
- Depth of hold: 10 ft 6 in (3.2 m)
- Complement: French Navy: 168; At capture:100 Dutch seamen + 122 French troops; Royal Navy:188
- Armament: Originally: 24 guns; French Navy; Upper deck (UD): 22 × 8-pounder guns; Spar deck: 2 × 6-pounder guns; At capture: UD: 24 × 9-pounder guns; Fc: 2 × 6-pounder guns; Royal Navy: UD: 20 × 9-pounder guns; QD: 2 × 6-pounder guns + 4 × 18-pounder carronades; Fc: 2 × 6-pounder guns + 2 × 18-pounder carronades

Waakzaamheid was a 24-gun corvette of the Dutch States Navy launched at Enkhuizen in 1786. The French Navy captured her in 1794 and renamed her Vigilance. As part of a French squadron, she raided British factories and merchantmen off the West African coast in 1794. By the next year, France overran the Dutch Republic and reorganised it into the client Batavian Republic, selling Vigilance to the newly formed Batavian Navy, who returned to using her original name. In the action of 24 October 1798, Waakzaamheid and the Batavian frigate Furie were captured near the Texel by the British frigate Sirius. The Royal Navy commissioned her as HMS Waaksaamheid before selling the ship in September 1802.

== Career ==
=== Dutch career ===
Waakzaamheid was a 24-gun corvette ordered by Admiralty of the Noorderkwartier of the Dutch States Navy. It was built by J. Hand and launched at Enkhuizen in 1786.

=== French career ===
The French Navy captured Waakzaamheid on 23 May 1794 during the War of the First Coalition, renaming her Vigilance. She was subsequently assigned to a French squadron consisting of the frigates Experiment and Félicité, the brig-sloops Épervier and Mutine along with Vigilance. The squadron cruised the West African coast in September 1794, attacking British factories and merchant shipping. Among the many British merchantmen they captured were the Sierra Leone Company vessels Harpy and Thornton and the slave ship Molly. In 1795, France overran the Dutch Republic and reorganised it into the client Batavian Republic. Vigilance was sold to the newly formed Batavian Navy, who renamed her after the ship's original name.

=== Batavian career ===
In the action of 24 October 1798, the British frigate Sirius captured Waakzaamheid along with the Batavian frigate Furie near the Texel as the two ships were transporting supplies and French troops to support a rebellion against British rule in Ireland. Waakzaamheid was under the command of Senior Captain Meindert van Neirop, and was armed with twenty-four 9-pounder guns on her main deck and two 6-pounders on her forecastle. She had 100 Batavian sailors and 122 French soldiers aboard her, and was transporting 2,000 stands of arms as well as other ordnance stores. Van Neirop put up no struggle to Sirius. The sloop Kite shared in the capture.

=== British career ===
Waakzaamheid arrived at Sheerness on 17 November 1798. She was commissioned into the Royal Navy as HMS Waaksamheid and was fitted out there between July 1799 and May 1800. In August 1800, she was part of a British fleet under Vice-Admiral Archibald Dickson which accompanied a diplomatic mission to Copenhagen headed by Lord Whitworth. The fleet did not go beyond Skagen Odde, and returned to Great Yarmouth on 14 September.

Captain Robert Hall was promoted to post captain on 18 November 1799. After his return to England on 31 August 1800 as captain of HMS Assistance, he took command of Waaksamheid on the North Sea Fleet. In 1800 Waaksaamheid participated in cruises off the Dutch coast in Dickson's squadron, and escorted convoys in the North Sea between the Baltic and Leith. On 11 October 1801 she was at Sheerness, waiting to be paid off following the signing of the Treaty of Amiens.

== Fate ==
The "Principal Officers and Commissioners of his Majesty's Navy" offered "Waaksamheidt, 504 Tons, Copper-bottomed, and Copper braces, and Pintles, lying at Deptford", for sale on 1 August 1802. She was offered for sale again on 9 September. She sold then.
