= French frigate Félicité =

Félicité has been the name of many ships in the French Navy including:

- French frigate Félicité (1756), launched in 1756 and captured by the Royal Navy in 1761 and burnt
- French frigate Félicité (1785), launched in 1785 and sold to Haiti in 1809
