= French ship Fidèle =

Fidèle has been the name of many ships in the French Navy including:

- French ship Fidèle (1704), launched in 1704 and lost in 1712
- French frigate Fidèle (1789), launched in 1789 and condemned in 1802
- French frigate Fidèle (1795), renamed Sirène launched in 1795 and broken up in 1825
