= York (1783 ship) =

History

Great Britain
- Name: York
- Launched: 1783, Archangel
- Fate: Burnt 30 November 1793
- Notes: Fir-built

General characteristics
- Tons burthen: 600, or 708 (bm)

York was launched in 1783 at Archangel. She traded with Northern Russia until 1792 when the Sierra Leone Company purchased her for use as a storeship. She was burnt at Sierra Leone on 30 November 1793.

== Career ==
York first appeared in Lloyd's Register (LR) inn 1783.

| Year | Master | Owner | Trade | Source |
|---|---|---|---|---|
| 1783 | J.Randall | Staniforth | Archangel–London | LR |
| 1792 | J.Randall; S.Hebden | Staniforth; Sierra Leone Company | London–Onega; London–Africa | LR |

In 1792 the Sierra Leone Company purchased York to use her as a storeship. On 9 May York, Hebden, master, sailed for Sierra Leone. In June Lloyd's List reported that she had sprung a leak and had had to put back into Plymouth. She sailed for Sierra Leone again on 30 July.

| Year | Master | Owner | Trade | Source |
|---|---|---|---|---|
| 1794 | S.Hebden | Sierra Leone Company | London–Africa | LR |

== Fate ==
Lloyd's List reported in February 1794 that the company's storeship York had burnt at Sierra Leone.

On 30 November 1793 York caught fire. She was holding £4–15,000 of African produce. Her master appears to have been Captain Wallace. Her crew, the crew of Harpy, and most of the people on shore provided no assistance. Captain Telford, master of Harpy, and the mate from York did what they could, but to no avail.
