= HMS Epervier (1797) =

Brig-sloop of the Royal Navy

History

France
- Name: Epervier
- Namesake: The hawk
- Builder: Benjamin Dubois, Montmarin (Saint Malo)
- Laid down: October 1787
- Launched: 23 February 1788
- Captured: 12 November 1797

Great Britain
- Name: HMS Epervier
- Acquired: By capture 12 November 1797
- Commissioned: Never commissioned
- Fate: Sold 7 September 1801

General characteristics
- Class & type: Expédition-class
- Type: Brig-sloop
- Tons burthen: 253 89/94 (bm)
- Length: 94 ft (28.7 m) (gundeck); 76 ft 3 1/8 in (23.2 m) (keel)
- Beam: 25 ft 0 1/4 in (7.6 m)
- Depth of hold: 10 ft 7 in (3.2 m)
- Sail plan: Brig
- Complement: Initially: 82 officers and men; Later (1794): 130; Privateer: 145
- Armament: Brick-aviso: 6 × 4-pounder guns (initially); Privateer: 16 × 4-pounder guns; British service: 18 × 18-pounder carronades

The first HMS Epervier, sometimes spelled HMS Epervoir, was the French ex-naval brick-aviso and then privateer Épervier, launched in 1788. The British captured her in 1797 and registered her in 1798 as an 18-gun brig-sloop of the Royal Navy. The Navy never commissioned her and she was sold in 1801.

== Design ==
Epervier was an Expédition-class "brick-aviso" (advice brig). Benjamin Dubois built the six members of the class at Saint-Malo Montmarin to a 3 October 1787 design by Pierre-Alexandre-Laurent Forfait, and all were launched in 1788. They cost 86,000 Livre tournois each.

The British captured two other members of the class, but never added them to the navy. The two were Curieux (captured in June 1793), and Impatient (captured in May 1803), by Naiad.

== French service ==
Épervier was originally armed with six 4-pounder guns. In 1792 her armament was increased to ten 4-pounders and four 12-pounder howitzers. The next year she received six more 4-pounder guns.

In September 1794 a French naval squadron comprising the razee Experiment under the command of lieutenant de vaisseau Arnaud, Vigilance, Félicité, Épervier, and Mutine was cruising the West African coast, destroying British factories and shipping. They captured Harpy, which they sent back to France, and another Sierra Leone Company ship, Thornton, which they destroyed. These were only two of the many vessels the squadron captured.

Épervier was in dry-dock at Rochefort in 1795. In April 1797 she was condemned at Cayenne, but then became a privateer. Between 1794 and 1797, she carried eighteen 4-pounders and four two-pounder guns.

== Capture ==
Epervier was operating as a French privateer when HMS Cerberus, under the command of Captain John Drew, captured her. Cerberus was on the Irish station when on 12 and 14 November 1797 she captured two French privateers, Epervier and Renard. Both vessels were pierced for 20 guns, were copper-bottomed, quite new, and fast sailers. Epervier was armed with sixteen 4-pounder guns and had a crew of 145 men. Renard carried eighteen 6-pounders and had a crew of 189 men. Lloyd's List reported Cerberus's capture of two privateers, one of 30 guns and one of 18, and the arrival of both at Cork.

Between these two captures, Cerberus recaptured the Adelphi, prize to Epervier. Adelphi, Patterson, master, had been sailing from Quebec to London when Epervier captured her; she too went into Cork. Epervier arrived at Plymouth on 12 January 1798, and was registered on 14 February. However, the Navy never commissioned her. The Navy did take Renard into service, retaining her name; she served until 1807. Although the Navy did not commission Epervier/Epervoir, two legal notices in the London Gazette give the names of two men, one of whom is described as a master on Epervoir, and one of whom is named as having been a lieutenant on her.

== Fate ==
The Commissioners of the Navy listed Epervoir, of 254 tons burthen, for sale at Plymouth in August 1801. She was sold on 7 September 1801.
