= French frigate Fidèle (1789) =

History

France
- Name: Fidèle
- Namesake: Fidelity
- Builder: Le Havre
- Laid down: October 1788
- Launched: 22 August 1789
- In service: September 1789
- Out of service: 23 October 1802
- Fate: Scrapped

General characteristics
- Class & type: Félicité-class frigate
- Displacement: 1140 tonneaux
- Tons burthen: 600 port tonneaux
- Length: 44.2 m (145 ft 0 in)
- Beam: 11.3 m (37 ft 1 in)
- Draught: 5.6 m (18 ft 4 in)
- Propulsion: Sail
- Armament: 32 guns: 26 12 pounders; 12 8 pounders; 6 hotwizers

Fidèle was a 32-gun Félicité-class frigate of the French Navy.

== Service history ==
In 1791, Fidèle took part in Girardin's Expedition to Martinique, under Captain François Étienne de Rosily-Mesros. In November, she served as a troopship and in Brest harbour. Fidèle took part in the Croisière du Grand Hiver and in the Battle of Groix, under Lieutenant Bernard.

In 1802, Fidèle was condemned, and used as a hulk and barracks in Brest until 1816. The vessel was then scrapped.

== Sources and references ==
- Roche, Jean-Michel (2005). Dictionnaire des bâtiments de la flotte de guerre française de Colbert à nos jours 1 1671 - 1870. p. 199. ISBN 978-2-9525917-0-6. OCLC 165892922.
