= Lady Penrhyn (1783 ship) =

History

American colonies
- Name: Rainbow
- Builder: North American colonies
- Launched: 1777
- Captured: 1782

Great Britain
- Name: Lady Penrhyn
- Namesake: Lady Penrhyn - née Anne Susannah Warburton (Note: Wife of Richard Pennant, 1st Baron Penrhyn, of the Penrhyn Estate in Llandygai, North Wales. The word Penrhyn itself is Welsh for headland or peninsula.)
- Owner: 1783:Ellis & Robert Bent; 1790:Dawson & Co.
- Port of registry: Liverpool (Registry №153, 10 November 1786)
- Acquired: 1783 by purchase of a prize
- Fate: Driven on shore in 1794

General characteristics .
- Tons burthen: 183, or 200, or 205, or 220 (bm)
- Length: 80 ft 4 in (24.5 m)
- Beam: 27 ft 3 in (8.3 m) (above the wales)
- Depth of hold: 5 ft 10 in (1.8 m)
- Propulsion: Sails
- Sail plan: Ship rig
- Complement: 60
- Armament: 16 × 4&6-pounder guns

Lady Penrhyn (or Lady Penrhyne) was an American vessel launched in 1777 that the British captured in 1782. Liverpool merchants purchased her and employed her in the African slave trade between 1783 and 1794. A squadron of the French navy drove her onshore on the coast of Africa in 1794.

== Career ==
Lady Penrhyn was launched in 1777 in America, possibly under the name Rainbow. The British captured her in 1782 and the Vice admiralty court in Antigua condemned her on 7 January 1783. She entered Lloyd's Register (LR) in 1784 with T. Reeves, master, E. Bent, owner, and trade Liverpool-Africa.

1st slave voyage (1784–1785): Captain Thomas Rives (or Reeves) sailed Lady Penrhyn to the Bight of Biafra and Gulf of Guinea islands. She purchased her slaves at New Calabar and She delivered her slaves to Kingston, Jamaica 31 December. There she landed 370 slaves. She sailed from Jamaica on 20 February 1785 and arrived back at Liverpool on 4 May. She had sailed with 40 crew members and she suffered five crew deaths on the voyage.

2nd slave voyage (1785–1786): Captain Rives sailed from Liverpool on 26 June 1785. Lady Penrhyn purchased her slaves at New Calabar and Bonny. She arrived at Kingston on 13 March 1786 and there landed 276 slaves. She sailed from Kingston on 2 May and arrived back at Liverpool on 29 June. She had left with 32 crew members and she suffered seven crew deaths on the voyage.

3rd slave voyage (1787): Captain Rives sailed from Liverpool on 10 January 1787. Lady Penrhyn purchased her slaves at Bonny and delivered them to St Vincent on 26 June. There she landed 270 slaves. She sailed from St Vincent on 21 July and arrived back at Liverpool on 20 August. She had left with 36 crew members and suffered eight crew deaths on the voyage.

On 3 March 1789 Captain John Gillis replaced Rives.å At some point she underwent repairs that increased her burthen to 205 tons.

4th slave voyage (1790–1791): Captain William Lace sailed Lady Penrhyn from Liverpool on 13 September 1790. She gathered her slaves at Calabar and delivered them to Grenada on 1 June 1791. There she landed 228 slaves. At some point Captain Thomas Smith replaced Lace. She sailed from Grenada on 19 July and arrived back at Liverpool on 7 September. She had left Liverpool with 20 crew members and she suffered seven crew deaths on the voyage.

In 1792 Lady Penrhyn underwent a large repair.

5th slave voyage (1792–1793): In 1793 her captain was initially Nathaniel Ireland. Lady Penrhyn sailed from Liverpool on 16 June 1792, and started purchasing her slaves starting on 4 August 1792, first at Calabar and then Bonny. She arrived Kingston on 6 March 1793. Captain John Mount replaced Ireland at some point. Lady Penrhyn had purchased 342 slaves and she landed 290, for a 17% mortality rate. She sailed from Kingston on 29 April, and arrived back at Liverpool on 11 June. She had left Liverpool with 32 crew members and she suffered eight crew deaths on the voyage.

On 1 February 1793 War with France had commenced. Captain Mount acquired a letter of marque on 12 June.

== Fate ==
Captain Luke Mann sailed Lady Penrhyn on her last voyage, leaving Liverpool on 5 August 1794. A French squadron of six vessels that included the brig Mutine, intercepted Lady Penrhyn off the coast of Africa on 7 December. They drove her on shore at Papaw (Little Popoe), where she was destroyed. (Note: The following reference clarifies the geography and the loss, though the footnotes are inconsistent as to the year.)
