= Félicité-class frigate =

Class overview
- Name: Félicité
- Operators: French Navy
- Preceded by: Vénus class
- Succeeded by: Sémillante class
- Completed: 4

General characteristics
- Type: Frigate
- Displacement: 1140 tonneaux
- Tons burthen: 600 port tonneaux
- Length: 44.18 m (144 ft 11 in)
- Beam: 11.26 m (36 ft 11 in)
- Draught: 5.63 m (18 ft 6 in)
- Propulsion: Sail
- Armament: 32 guns: 26 12 pounders; 6 6 pounders

The Félicité class was a type of (12-pounder-armed) 32-gun frigate of the French Navy, designed by Pierre-Alexandre-Laurent Forfait (as approved by Léon-Michel Guignace). This was the first class of 12-pounder armed frigate to be designed and built in France following the end of the War for American Independence.

- Félicité

Builder: Brest Dockyard
Laid down: 1 January 1785
Launched: 4 August 1785
Completed: 28 August 1785
Fate: captured by British Navy in the Caribbean on 18 June 1809, sold to Haiti and commissioned as the Améthyste, defected 1812 to Haitian rebels and renamed Heureuse Réunion, retaken by British frigate HMS Southampton on 3 February 1812, returned to Haiti, resuming name Améthyste sold 1818.

- Calypso

Builder: Brest Dockyard
Laid down: 4 July 1785
Launched: 2 December 1785
Completed: January 1786
Fate: defected to the Spanish at Trinidad in January 1793.

- Fidèle

Builder: Le Havre
Laid down: October 1788
Launched: 22 July 1789
Completed: September 1789
Fate: condemned October 1802 at Brest and hulked in May 1804, probably demolished 1813.

- Fortunée

Builder: Le Havre
Laid down: 5 December 1789
Launched: 28 September 1791
Completed: May 1792
Fate: burnt in February 1794 at Corsica to avoid capture.
