= Liverpool Hero (1781 ship) =

History

FranceFrance
- Name: Jeune Emilia
- Launched: 1777, France
- Captured: 1780

Great Britain
- Name: Liverpool Hero
- Acquired: 1781
- Fate: Lost 1794

General characteristics
- Tons burthen: 120, or 200, or 211, or 226, or 239 (bm)
- Length: 82 ft 3 in (25.1 m)
- Beam: 25 ft 1 in (7.6 m)
- Armament: 1781:14 × 9-pounder guns

Liverpool Hero was built in France in 1777, probably as Jeune Emilia. She was taken in prize in 1780. In 1781 she entered into the triangular trade in enslaved people. From 1781 she made six complete voyages from Liverpool as a slave ship. On her fourth enslaving voyage she suffered an exceptionally high mortality rate among the captives she had embarked. Her third voyage had been marred by high mortality, but on the fourth 330 captives, 59% of the number she had embarked, died. She was lost in 1794 off the coast of Africa on her seventh voyage, probably with her crew and captives.

== Career ==
Liverpool Hero was taken in prize in 1780 and condemned that same year. She was probably Jeune Emilia, which the Liverpool privateer Hawke captured while homeward bound from an enslaving voyage. Jeune Emilia was sold for £3,700, increasing the profitability of an already profitable voyage.

In 1781 she was sold to buyers at Liverpool. Liverpool Hero first appeared in Lloyd's Register (LR) in 1781.

Year	Master	Owner	Trade	Source
1781	I.Cooper	Earle & Co.	Liverpool–Africa	LR

1st voyage transporting enslaved people (1781–1782): Captain John Cooper sailed from Liverpool on 24 May 1781. Liverpool Hero acquired captives at Calabar and sailed from Africa on 17 January 1782. She arrived at Antigua on 4 March with 418 captives. She sailed from Antigua on 15 June and arrived back at Liverpool on 14 August. She had left from Liverpool with 47 crew members and had suffered eight crew deaths on the voyage.

2nd voyage transporting enslaved people (1783–1784): Captain Cooper sailed from Liverpool on 16 March 1783. Liverpool Hero acquired captives at Calabar and arrived at Dominica on 26 January 1784 with 400 captives. She sailed for Liverpool on 17 February and arrived there on 13 April. She had left Liverpool with 41 crew members and she had suffered four crew deaths on her voyage. (Note: Captain Cooper's articles of agreement are in the collection of the Maritime Museum, Liverpool.)

3rd voyage transporting enslaved people (1784–1785): Captain John Savage sailed from Liverpool on 28 July 1784. Liverpool Hero started gathering captives at Calabar on 17 September and sailed from Africa on 30 April 1785, having embarked 513 captives. She arrived at Dominica on 26 June with 299 captives; the mortality rate among the slaves was 42%. She had left Liverpool with 43 crew members and she arrived with 29. Liverpool Hero arrived back at Liverpool on 5 September; she had suffered 16 crew deaths on her voyage.

4th voyage transporting enslaved people (1786–1787): Captain John Cooper sailed from Liverpool on 19 February 1786. Liverpool Hero started acquiring captives at Calabar on 27 April, and sailed from Africa on 15 June, having embarked 560 captives. She arrived at Dominica on 3 September with 230 slaves, having lost 330 (59%) of her slaves on the way.

This was a notably high mortality. The high mortality rate may have been due to Liverpool Hero's owners, the Earle brothers, instructing their captains to acquire slaves at Calabar. They did warn their captains that the place was "remarkable for great mortality in slaves". Mortality in the enslaving trade tended to be higher than that in other trades. Mortality rates on vessels leaving Calabar were much higher than those on vessels leaving Bonny, 75 miles away.

Liverpool Hero departed Dominica on 14 October and arrived back at Liverpool on 10 December. She had left Liverpool with 41 crew members and had suffered 14 crew deaths on her voyage. The ship's return cargo included rum, Madeira wine, ivory tusks, palm oil, long pepper, black wood, and beeswax.

The Slave Trade Act 1788 (Dolben's Act) limited the number of enslaved people that British slave ships could transport, based on the ships' tons burthen. It was the first British legislation passed to regulate the shipping of enslaved people. On her next two voyages Liverpool Hero carried fewer captives than she had on the previous two. Dolben's Act apparently resulted in some reduction in the numbers of slaves carried per vessel, and possibly in mortality.

5th voyage transporting enslaved people (1790–1791): Captain Thomas Smith sailed from Liverpool on 3 March 1790. Liverpool Hero acquired captives at Calabar and arrived at Grenada with 286 on 4 March 1791. She left Grenada on 20 March and arrived back at Liverpool on 27 April. She had left Liverpool with 26 crew members and had suffered six crew deaths on her voyage. She had arrived at Grenada with Smith as master, but arrived back at Liverpool with William Lace as master. (Note: Smith had not died. He would die on 19 June 1801 while master of Trelawney.)

6th voyage transporting enslaved people (1790–1791): Captain Joseph Hodgson sailed from Liverpool on 3 July 1791. Liverpool Hero started acquiring captives on 28 August at Calabar. She then acquired more at New Calabar. She left Africa on 10 December, having embarked 360 captives. She arrive at Grenada on 20 January 1791 with 343 slaves, for a 5% mortality rate. She sailed from Grenada on 7 February 1792 and arrived back at Liverpool on 19 March. At some point in the voyage John Mount replaced Hodgson as master. (Note: Hodgson died in 1794 while master of Union. Mount died in that same year while master of Kitty.) Liverpool Hero had sailed from Liverpool with 25 crew members and had suffered three crew deaths on her voyage.

Year	Master	Owner	Trade	Source & notes
1793	Thornbro	Webster & Co.	Liverpool–Africa	LR; raised 1784, & repairs 1791 & 1792

7th voyage transporting enslaved people (1792–Loss): Captain John Thornborrow (or Thornborough) sailed from Liverpool on 6 October 1792. Liverpool Hero started acquiring captives on 16 April. She acquired captives at Cape Coast Castle, Little Popo, and Badagry or Appa.

== Loss ==
In July 1794, Lloyd's List reported that Liverpool Hero, Thornborough, master, had been lost off Papo, on the coast of Africa. She had been on her way from Africa for the West Indies. As of February 2023, it is not clear what happened to her crew and captives, but the presumption is that they perished with the ship.

In 1794, 25 British slave ships were lost. Eighteen were lost on their way to Africa, and two were lost in the Middle Passage, while sailing from Africa to the West Indies. During the period 1793 to 1807, war, rather than maritime hazards or resistance by the captives, was the greatest cause of vessel losses among British slave vessels.
