= Sierra Leone Company =

Corporate body involved in founding the second British colony in Africa

The Sierra Leone Company was the corporate body involved in founding the second British colony in Africa on 11 March 1792 through the resettlement of Black Loyalists who had initially been settled in Nova Scotia (the Nova Scotian Settlers) after the American Revolutionary War. The company came about because of the work of the ardent abolitionists Granville Sharp, Thomas Clarkson, Henry Thornton, and Thomas's brother John Clarkson, who is considered one of the founding fathers of Sierra Leone. The company was the successor to the St. George Bay Company, a corporate body established in 1790 that re-established Granville Town in 1791 for the 60 remaining Old Settlers.

== St. George's Bay Company ==
The Sierra Leone Company was the successor to the St. George's Bay Company that had been founded in 1790 following a mostly unsuccessful effort by the Committee for the Relief of the Black Poor in 1787 to establish a free settlement for the "Black Poor" of London, many of whom were Black Loyalists, who had escaped and fought for the British following Dunmore's Proclamation during the American War of Independence. The 1787 expedition was made up of 300 of London's Black Poor, 60 English Working-class Women, and an assortment of white officials, clergy and craftsmen to assist in building the colony – 411 men, women and children in all. Upon landing, they founded Granville Town as their base. This first colony only lasted about two and a half years, decimated by disease and later abandonment. The coup de grace occurred in 1789, when the neighbouring Temne people burned the settlement during a dispute between the Temne and slave traders. Although Granville Town was re-founded in 1791 under the auspices of Alexander Falconbridge, this settlement was not the basis for the colony or settlement established by the company in March 1792.

== Prime movers of the cause ==
Both ventures were promoted by the anti-slavery activist Granville Sharp, who published a prospectus for the proposed company in 1790 entitled Free English Territory in AFRICA. The prospectus made clear its abolitionist view and stated that several respectable gentlemen who had already subscribed had done so "not with a view of any present profit to themselves, but merely, through benevolence and public spirit, to promote a charitable measure, which may hereafter prove of great national importance to the Manufactories, and other Trading Interests of this Kingdom".

Among the early subscribers were many friends of Sharp involved in the Clapham Sect: Henry Thornton, William Wilberforce, Rev. Thomas Clarkson, Rev. Thomas Gisbourne and Samuel Whitbread.

Sierra Leone Company Act 1791
- Act of Parliament
- Parliament of Great Britain
- Long title: An Act for establishing a Company for carrying on Trade between the Kingdom of Great Britain and the Coasts, Harbours, and Countries of Africa, and for enabling the said Company to hold by Grant from His Majesty, His Heirs, and Successors, and from the Native Princes of Africa, a certain District of Land commonly called The Peninsula of Sierra Leone, now vested in His Majesty, or belonging to the said Princes, for the better enabling the said Company to carry on the said Trade.
- Citation: 31 Geo. 3. c. 55
- Territorial extent: Great Britain

Dates
- Royal assent: 6 June 1791
- Commencement: 10 August 1790 (Note: Start of session.)
- Repealed: 6 August 1861
Other legislation
Repealed by	Statute Law Revision Act 1861
Relates to	Sierra Leone Company Act 1807

Status: Repealed

Text of statute as originally enacted

Initial attempts to gain a royal charter for the company proved fruitless following opposition from the attorney general, Archibald Macdonald. The company then proceeded to gain incorporation through act of parliament. However this too received opposition, particularly from the Committee of the Company of Merchants Trading to Africa, who called a meeting in March 1791. This led to three petitions being organised by slave trade merchants in London, Liverpool and Bristol. Slave traders in Lancaster also organised a petition as did the Africa Company. Further opposition was organised by the Standing Committee of West India Planters and Merchants, who arranged for two meetings with William Pitt, the Prime Minister. Nevertheless, Henry Thornton was able to successfully guide the Sierra Leone settlement bill through parliament, despite the efforts of the Liverpool MP Bamber Gascoyne and other anti-abolitionists. On 30 May 1791, the bill was passed 87 votes to 9, becoming the Sierra Leone Company Act 1791 (31 Geo. 3. c. 55).

== Colonization: the colony of Freetown ==
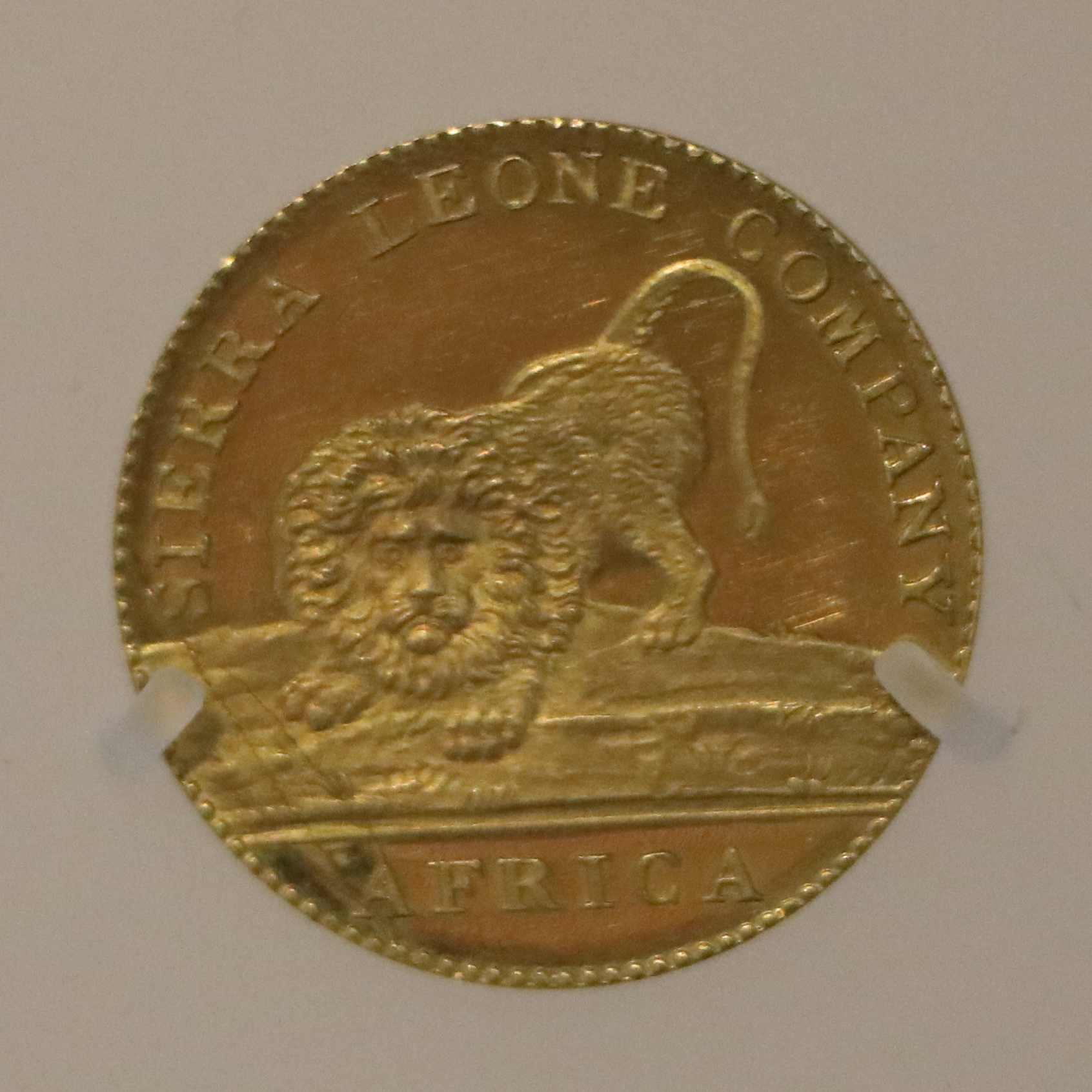
Sierra Leone Company 20 cent coin

In 1792, John Clarkson led over 1100 black settlers from Halifax, Nova Scotia, to establish a new colony and it was on this basis that the Nova Scotian Settlers founded Freetown, Sierra Leone. The majority of these settlers were former slaves of the American colonies, freed by the British during the American Revolution and forced to relocate after the British defeat. It was the determination of these settlers that caused Freetown to take shape and survive after they founded it in March 1792. The company issued decimal currency in the form of dollars and cents struck by Matthew Boulton at Soho Mint and issued in 1791 (although these coins did not circulate until the founding of the Colony in 1792) and 1796.

When war broke out between Great Britain and France (one of the French Revolutionary Wars) the company lost supplies and a number of ships to privateers and the French navy. American merchantmen, as neutral traders, used the opportunity to establish trade. Trouble continued, though, for in September 1794 the French burned Freetown in a raid. The colonists rebuilt, and American merchants aided by selling the company vital supplies.

During these years the colony's acting governor, Zachary Macaulay, and his council agreed to accept American blacks as settlers with a gift of free Sierra Leone land if they met four criteria: they must have letters of recommendation of their upright character from their clergy, they must agree to become British subjects and abide by British law, they must secure their own passage to the colony, and they must clear at least one third of the land given to them for agriculture within two years of arrival.

Sierra Leone Company Act 1807
- Act of Parliament
- Parliament of the United Kingdom
- Long title: An Act for transferring to His Majesty, certain Possessions and Rights vested in the Sierra Leone Company, and for shortening the Duration of the said Company; and for preventing any dealing or trafficking in the buying or selling of Slaves within the Colony of Sierra Leone.
- Citation: 47 Geo. 3 Sess. 2. c. 44
- Territorial extent: United Kingdom

Dates
- Royal assent: 8 August 1807
- Commencement: 8 August 1807 (Note: The Acts of Parliament (Commencement) Act 1793.)
- Repealed: 10 August 1872
Other legislation
Amended by	Statute Law Revision Act 1861
Repealed by	Statute Law Revision Act 1872 (No. 2)
Relates to	Sierra Leone Company Act 1791

Status: Repealed

Text of statute as originally enacted

The Sierra Leone Company was succeeded in 1807 by the African Institution.

== Ships of the Sierra Leone company ==
- Amy, of 186 or 190 tons (bm), had been launched in 1790 in Newfoundland. In April 1794 the company sent her to São Tomé to gather "useful plants and seeds". The company sold her circa 1796 and she became a West Indiaman. She was last listed in 1798.
- Calypso, of 190 tons (bm), had been built in Bermuda in 1795. A French privateer under Spanish colours captured Calypso, Cole, master, in February 1798 as Calypso was going down the Gold Coast from Sierra Leone.
- Domingo sailed to the River Gabon in April 1794 to acquire wax, ivory, and redwood.
- Duke of Clarence was stationed in April 1794 at Rio Pongas as a factory.
- Harpy
- James and William carried rum and rice to the Gold Coast in April 1794.
- Lapwing
- Naimbana
- Nancy
- Ocean
- Thornton
- York
- The company also employed a small vessel as a packet to ferry goods and mail back to Freetown.

== Bibliography ==
- Braidwood, Stephen (1994), Black Poor and White Philanthropists: London's Blacks and the Foundation of the Sierra Leone Settlement 1786–1791, Liverpool University Press.
- Brooks, George E. Jr. (1974). "The Providence African Society's Sierra Leone Emigration Scheme 1784–1795: Prologue to the African Colonization Movement". International Journal of African Historical Studies. 7 (2): 183–202. doi:10.2307/217128. JSTOR 217128.
- Scanlan, Padraic X. (2017). Freedom's Debtors: British Antislavery in Sierra Leone in the Age of Revolution. Yale University Press. ISBN 978-0300217445.
- Thomas, Lamont D. (1988). Paul Cuffe: Black Entrepreneur and Pan-Africanist. Urbana and Chicago: University of Illinois Press.
