= HMS Mutine (1797) =

Brig-sloop of the Royal Navy

History

France
- Name: Mutine
- Namesake: "Mischievous"
- Ordered: 15 April 1793
- Builder: Pierre, Jacques, & Nicolas Fortier, Honfleur
- Laid down: January 1793
- Launched: 5 January 1794
- In service: February 1794
- Captured: 29 May 1797

Great Britain
- Name: HMS Mutine
- Acquired: Captured in a cutting out action on 29 May 1797
- Honours and awards: Naval General Service Medal with clasp "Nile"
- Fate: Sold in 1803

General characteristics
- Class & type: 12-gun brig-sloop
- Displacement: 475 tons
- Tons burthen: 349 54/94 (bm)
- Length: 104 ft 6 in (31.9 m) (overall); 84 ft 10 in (25.9 m) (keel)
- Beam: 28 ft (8.5 m)
- Depth of hold: 13 ft (4.0 m)
- Propulsion: Sails
- Complement: French service: 116–140; English service: 121 men
- Armament: French service: 12 × 6-pounder guns + 2 × 36-pounder obusiers; British service: 18 × 6-pounder guns

Mutine was an 18-gun Belliqueuse-class gun-brig of the French Navy, built to a design by Pierre-Alexandre-Laurent Forfait, and launched in 1794 at Honfleur. She took part in the Battle of Santa Cruz de Tenerife, where the British captured her. She was recommissioned in the Royal Navy as HMS Mutine, and eventually sold in 1803.

== French service and capture ==
After her commissioning, Mutine served at Le Havre, Brest, La Rochelle, and Rochefort. Initially, she served under the command of lieutenant de vaisseau Beenst (the elder).

In late 1794 and early 1795 she was part of a French naval squadron comprising the razee Experiment under the command of lieutenant de vaisseau Arnaud, Vigilance, Félicité, Épervier, and Mutine was cruising the West African coast, destroying British factories and shipping. In September they captured Harpy, Telford, master, which they sent back to France, and another Sierra Leone Company ship, Thornton, Sayford, master, which they destroyed. These were only two of the many vessels the squadron captured.

The squadron drove the slave ship Lady Penrhyn on shore on 7 December 1794, at Papaw (Little Popoe), where she was destroyed. The squadron also captured the cutter Bee. Mutine herself grounded while chasing a British merchant vessel into the Benin River. (Note: The following reference clarifies the geography and the loss, though the footnotes are inconsistent as to the year.)

In 1795, under enseigne de vaisseau non entretenu Lefebvre, she escorted a prize back to la Rochelle. Then she cruised the coasts of Guinea before returning to Rochefort.

On 4 March 1796, under lieutenant de vaisseau Xavier Pomiès Mutine departed île d'Aix in a frigate division under Rear-admiral Sercey, bound for a campaign in the Indies; however, a gale damaged her and she had to double back for repairs. She then took part in the Expédition d'Irlande. She also made a voyage from Rochefort, to Ferrol then to Tenerife, before returning to Lorient.

In 1797, Mutine was sent on a secret mission to Batavia under Pomiès, by then promoted to capitaine de frégate. She sailed from Brest on 8 May 1797 for Île de France and had put into the Bay of Santa Cruz on 26 May to take on water.

Lieutenant Thomas Hardy captured Mutine on 29 May during the battle for Santa Cruz. (Note: Hardy would later become Vice-Admiral Horatio Nelson's flag captain at the Battle of Trafalgar.) Hardy led a cutting out party using boats from Minerve and Lively, and was able to board and capture Mutine. He then sailed her out of the port to the British fleet under heavy fire from shore and naval guns. Hardy was wounded during the action, as were 14 of the other British officers and men in the cutting out party. Captain Pomiès was on shore at the time of her capture. In 1847 the Admiralty recognized the action by awarding the Naval General Service Medal with clasp "29 May Boat Service 1797" to the surviving claimants from the action.

A French account states that not only was Pomiès ashore at the time of Hardy's attack, so were almost all of Mutine's crew members. Although this made it easier for the British to capture her, it rebounded to the benefit of France's ally, Spain, at the battle of Santa Cruz de Tenerife in July. The French sailors augmented the force that Lieutenant General Antonio Gutiérrez de Otero y Santayana cobbled together to resist, and ultimately repel, the British attack, which became a debacle that cost Rear-Admiral Horatio Nelson his right arm.

== British service ==
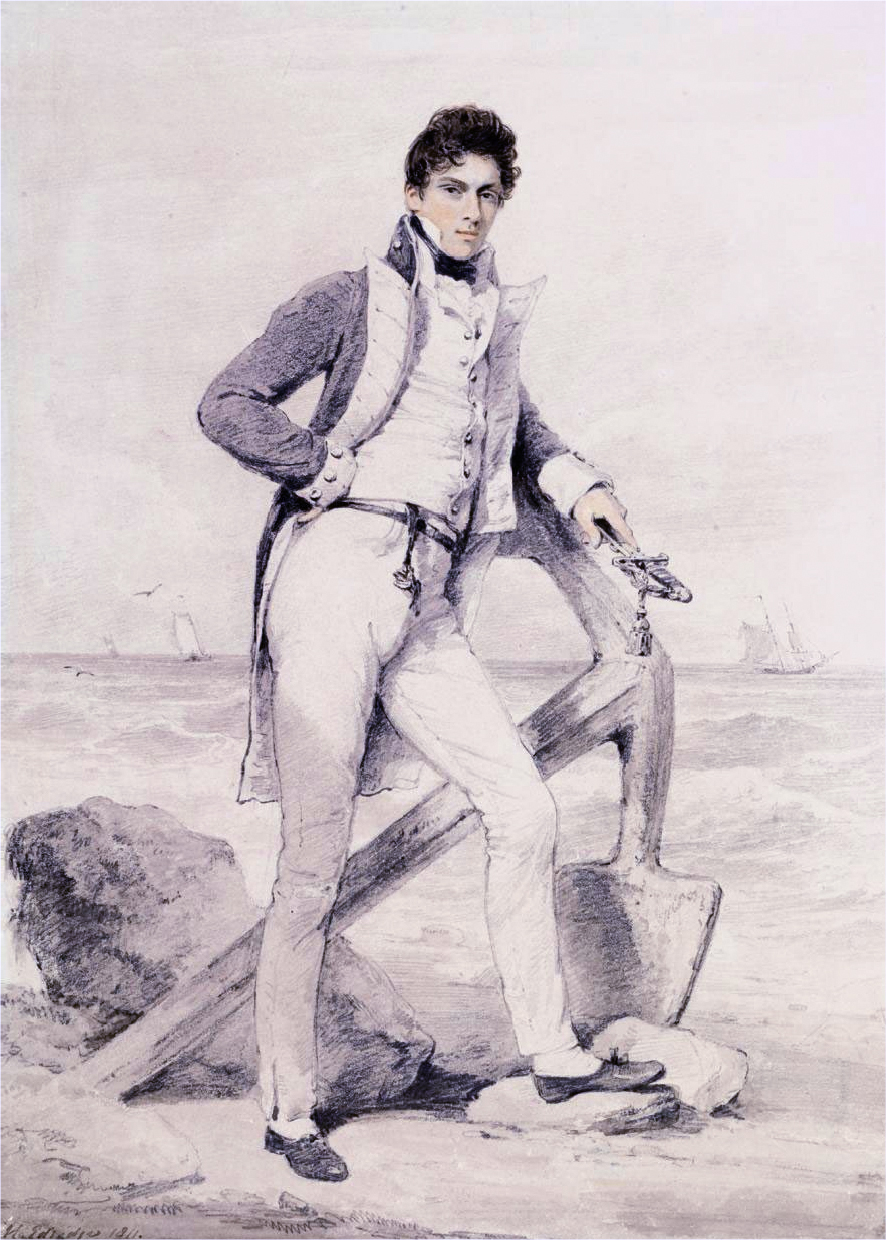
William Hoste, who commanded Mutine, in 1811

Mutine was subsequently commissioned into the Royal Navy on 8 August 1797. Hardy was already in command of her, Captain Benjamin Howell having appointed him as a reward for the capture. This was the first ship Hardy would command.

On 5 June 1798 Mutine met up with Rear-Admiral Horatio Nelson at San Pietro Island, off Sardinia, informing him that ten ships of the line and a 50-gun ship were on their way to join him. When they did, Earl St. Vincent's orders were that Nelson should then seek out the French Toulon fleet.

Nelson deployed his three third rates and Mutine in a screen while waiting for his reinforcements. The third rates Vanguard and Orion captured two Spanish merchantmen (out of a flotilla of 15), before Nelson ordered his vessels to abandon the chase. Once Nelson had met up with the British ships of the line that were joining him, he sent Mutine, his sole scouting vessel, to Civitavecchia to seek information about the whereabouts of the French. Mutine later rejoined Nelson without having found out anything. Mutine also visited Naples and Alexandria, arriving and leaving before the French fleet arrived, while seeking news of the French fleet. Eventually, Nelson and the French met off Egypt.

Under Hardy, Mutine was present at the Battle of the Nile on 1 and 2 August 1798. During the battle she came to the assistance of Culloden, which had run aground, and so did not directly participate in the fighting herself. After the British victory, Leander was sent to carry the dispatches of the battle, but was captured before she could deliver them. Mutine, under the command of Lieutenant Thomas Bladen Capel, had been sent out on 13 August with a second copy and so became the first ship to report the victory when she arrived at Naples on 3 September. Capel handed over command to Lieutenant William Hoste and then traveled overland and arrived with the dispatches at the Admiralty on 2 October. Nearly five decades later the battle was among the actions recognised by a clasp attached to the Naval General Service Medal, which the Admiralty awarded upon application to all British participants still living in 1847.

In February 1799, William Hoste received promotion to commander and was confirmed in command, and Mutine was employed carrying dispatches for Nelson. Mutine returned from these duties in early 1799, by which time the French had occupied Naples. Mutine was tasked to sail off the coast to keep watch on their activities. She was refitted at Port Mahon in the summer of 1799, and then was present at the surrender of the French garrison at Civitavecchia on 21 September. Culloden, Minotaur, Mutine, Transfer, and the bomb vessel Perseus shared in the prize money for the capture of the town and fortress. The British also captured the French polacca Il Reconniscento.

Mutine was still in the Mediterranean in 1800. On 19 January she captured the ship Signor Delia Providenza, which was sailing from Marseilles to Genoa with a cargo of corn and wine, and another vessel of unknown name whose crew had deserted. She was carrying a cargo of corn and a few bales of leather.

On 20 February, Mutine recaptured the Ragusan brig Nova Sorte, which was sailing from Barcelona to Leghorn, carrying wine. The commissioned and warrant officers of Minotaur, Phaeton, Santa Dorothea, and Entreprenante shared in the prize money by agreement.

Then on 5 March Mutine recaptured another Ragusan brig, the Madona del Grazie, which was sailing the same route and carrying the same cargo as the Nova Sorte. The commissioned and warrant officers of Santa Dorothea shared by agreement.

The next day Mutine captured a Ragusan brig sailing from Barcelona bound to Leghorn, but carrying sundry merchandise. On 7 March, Mutine captured the Genoese polacre ship Il Volante, sailing from Especia to Leghorn with a cargo of iron, coffee, etc. Two days later, Mutine captured the Genoese polacre Volante, which was sailing from Genoa to Cagliari with a cargo of iron, coffee, etc.

On 29 March Mutine captured the privateer Victoire. Victoire was armed with two guns and carried a crew of 28 men. (Note: Demerliac speculates that this may have been a privateer schooner from Cayenne commissioned in July 1799.)

On 14 April, Phaeton and Peterel captured the St. Rosalia. Mutine, Minotaur, Santa Dorothea, Entreprenante and Cameleon shared with Phaeton by agreement.

On 3 May, Mutine, Phaeton and Cameleon captured eight vessels in Anguilla Bay:

- Stella de Nort;
- Santa Maria;
- Nostra Senora del Carmine;
- Fiat Volantes Deus;
- Nostra Signora del Assunta;
- Nostra Signora de Sonsove;
- San Nicolas; and
- San Joseph (San Giuseppe).

Five days later they captured eleven Genoese vessels. They captured the first eight at St Remo:

- Polacre ship St. Giovanni, which was sailing in ballast from St Remo;
- Polacre brig Achille, which was sailing from Marseilles to Genoa with a cargo of corn and wine;
- Polacre barque St. Antonio, which was sailing from Cette to Genoa with a cargo of wine;
- Polacre brig Santa (Assunta), which was sailing from Ard to Port Maurice with a cargo of wine;
- Polacre ship Conception, sailing in ballast to Port Maurice;
- Polacre ship Madona del Carmine, sailing from Cette to Genoa with a cargo of wine;
- Settee Signora del Carmine, which was sailing from Marseilles to Genoa with a cargo of corn;
- Settee St. Giuseppe, which was sailing from Marseilles to Port Maurice with a cargo of corn;
- Settee Immaculate Conception, which was sailing from Cette to Genoa with a cargo of wine;
- Settee Amina Purgatorio, which sailing from Cette to Genoa with a cargo of wine; and
- Settee Virgine Rosaria, which was sailing from Cette to Genoa with a cargo of wine.

Mutine was in company with Corso when they destroyed one Genoese vessel on 24 July and captured three others on 25 July:

- Settee, of unknown name, which was sailing in ballast from Port Maurice, and which they destroyed;
- Polacre ship Saint Gio Baptiste, sailing from Marseilles to Port Maurice with a cargo of wine;
- Settee Misericordia, which was sailing from Marseilles to Savona with a cargo of hoops; and
- Settee Nostra Signora Montersero, which was sailing from Port Maurice to Marseilles with a light cargo.

On 20 August Mutine took the Dangerouse, a lateen vessel privateer of two guns and four swivel guns. Dangerouse was sailing from Bastia to Toulon.

Then on 2 September Mutine intercepted and captured the French brig Due Fratelli, in ballast. She also captured the Piccolo Tobia.

On 1 February 1801, Mutine and Caroline captured the Swedish brig Active, which was sailing from Mogadore to Leghorn with a cargo of hides. Later that month Mutine met the cutter Joseph at Menorca. Mutine transferred to Joseph dispatches from Egypt for Britain and the news that Rear-Admiral Warren's squadron had been following Admiral Ganteaume's squadron, which had been taking troops to Egypt but had lost the French during a gale off Sardinia. However, Ganteaume had had to return to Toulon after three of his ships of the line had lost their masts. Joseph arrived in Plymouth on 7 May. Mutine took Joseph's dispatches on to Egypt.

== Fate ==
In 1801 Mutine sailed to Trieste. In 1802, under the command of Lord William FitzRoy, she sailed to Portsmouth, arriving on 4 September and then sailing for Chatham on 9 September to be paid off. She was sold in 1803.
