= French frigate Félicité (1785) =

History

France
- Name: Félicité
- Namesake: Felicity
- Builder: Brest
- Laid down: 1 January 1785
- Launched: 4 August 1785
- In service: 28 August 1785
- Out of service: 16 June 1809
- Fate: Sold to Haiti

State of Haiti
- Name: Améthyste
- Namesake: Amethyst
- In service: 1809
- Fate: Sold 1818

General characteristics
- Class & type: Félicité-class frigate
- Displacement: 1140 tonneaux
- Tons burthen: 600 port tonneaux
- Length: 44.2 m (145 ft)
- Beam: 11.3 m (37 ft)
- Draught: 5.6 m (18 ft)
- Propulsion: Sail
- Armament: 26 × 12-pounder guns; 12 × 8-pounder guns; 6 × howitzers
- Armour: Timber

Félicité was a 32-gun frigate of the French Navy, lead ship of her class. Captured by the British Royal Navy and sold to the State of Haiti, she entered Haitian service as Améthyste.

== French service ==
In 1786, Félicité served as division flagship for Chef d'escadre Pâris de Soulanges in the 12-ship Escadre d'évolution. She was at Cherbourg when a naval review and a simulated naval battle took place as Louis XVI visited the harbour.

In 1792, Félicité traveled to the Caribbean Sea. On 29 December, she took part in the capture of the royalist brig Légère off Saint-Pierre.

In September 1794, a French naval squadron comprising the razee Experiment under the command of lieutenant de vaisseau Arnaud, Vigilance, Félicité, Épervier, and Mutine was cruising the West African coast, destroying British factories and shipping. They captured Harpy, which they sent back to France, and another Sierra Leone Company ship, Thornton, which they destroyed. These were only two of the many vessels the squadron captured.

On 6 February 1806, Fėlicitė was present at the Battle of San Domingo, from which she escaped unharmed together with two other French vessels, the 36-gun frigate Cornélie and the 20-gun ship-corvette Diligente.

The frigates Comète and Félicité, and the corvette Diligente captured and burned the American vessel Lark, Moore, master, which was sailing from Philadelphia to Jamaica. (Note: The report in Lloyd's List refers to the "brig Diligente". The French navy had a brig Diligent, but she was not in the area.)

In February 1809, she sailed with Troude's division to the Caribbean, armed en flûte.

In May, British ships chased two French frigates, armed en flûte and bringing supplies to Martinique, into the Basse Terre roads. The British set up a blockade, trapping Félicité and Furieuse in their shelter. By this time HMS Unique, was in poor condition – in particular she was leaky, in part from the constant firing of her guns at shore batteries. The decision was made to use her as a fireship in an attempt to destroy one or both of the French vessels. On 31 May, she was sent in during the evening but the mission failed. Having been lightened of most of her stores, Unique was vulnerable to gusts of wind, and she grounded not far from one of her targets. Her captain then set fire to a train of explosives to prevent her falling into French hands. Félicité and Furieuse escaped some time later, only to end up being captured. HMS Bonne Citoyenne captured Furieuse on 5 July; Félicité's French service lasted only a few months longer.

On 18 June, HMS Latona and HMS Cherub captured Félicité. At the time of her capture, Félicité was armed with only 14 guns, but had 174 men on board.

The British sold the vessel to Henri Christophe's State of Haiti the next month. The Haitians renamed her Améthyste.

== Haitian service ==
For reasons unknown, in January 1812, the Haitian Navy defected to the warlord Jérôme-Maximilien Borgella, who placed a French privateer named Gaspard in command of Améthyste (recommissioned as Heureuse Réunion), a corvette, and a brig. Gaspard armed the flagship with 44 cannon and a crew of over 600 men including Haitians, Frenchmen, and Americans.

Stopped soon thereafter upon suspicion of piracy by Captain James Yeo, commanding HMS Southampton, Heureuse Réunion began the action of 3 February 1812. Unable to close fast enough to board the more nimble Southampton and losing her mainmast, Heureuse Réunion surrendered and was dragged to Jamaica, where the British returned to the ownership of Haiti.
