= HMS Harpy (1777) =

British naval sloop, whaler, and merchantman 1777–1793

Great Britain
- Name: HMS Harpy
- Builder: John Fisher, Liverpool
- Launched: 8 May 1777
- Acquired: By purchase 11 December 1796
- Fate: Sold 21 March 1783

Great Britain
- Name: Harpy
- Acquired: By purchase 1783
- Fate: Captured September–October 1794

France
- Name: Harcourt
- Acquired: October 1794 by capture
- Renamed: Harpie (1795)
- Stricken: 1796

General characteristics
- Tons burthen: 36722/94, or 368, or 400 (bm)
- Length: Overall:120 ft 9 in (36.8 m); Keel:85 ft 0 in (25.9 m)
- Beam: 28 ft 6 in (8.7 m)
- Depth of hold: 11 ft 0 in (3.4 m)
- Complement: HMS; Sloop:125; Fire ship:50; French service:170
- Armament: HMS:18 × 6-pounder guns; Sierra Leone Company:12 × 6-pounder guns; French service:20 guns

HMS Harpy was launched at Liverpool in 1777, the British Royal Navy having purchased her on the stocks. The Navy sold her in 1783. As Harpy she made voyages to the northern whale fishery, and one voyage as a whaler in the British southern whale fishery. The Sierra Leone Company then purchased her. A French naval squadron captured her in September 1794. The French Navy briefly took her into service as Harcourt, and then Harpie. She was struck in 1796.

== Career ==
=== Royal Navy ===
The Navy commissioned Harpy in April 1777 under Commander Roger Wills for Home waters. In 1779 she was in the Belfast area. On 30 April she and HMS Boston captured the American privateer Revenge.

Harpy was registered as a fire ship on 25 August 1779, and underwent temporary fitting for the role between August and September 1779 at Portsmouth.

Commander Phillip Walsh recommissioned Harpy in August, for the Western squadron. In May 1780 she was at Portsmouth undergoing refitting and coppering. Harpy shared with some 30 vessels in the prize money for the capture on 4 July 1780 of the French privateer Comte d'Estaing.

In February 1781 Commander William Cayley assumed command of Harpy.

In spring 1781, Admiral George Darby sailed a fleet to Gibraltar to relieve the siege for a second time. On the way the fleet captured Duc de Chartres, the Spanish frigate Santa Leucadia, and the French brig Trois Amis. Although HMS Cumberland executed the actual capture of Duc de Chartres, the entire British fleet of 42 vessels, including Harpy, shared in the resulting prize money.

Harpy shared with 11 other ships the prize money for Noord Beck, captured on 23 June 1781, and the recapture of Neptune four days later. She also shared with a number of vessels in the prize money for the Voyageur, captured on 12 August.

On 11 October the three fireships Harpy, Lightning, and Firebrand were lying at anchor at Plymouth when Firebrand caught fire and blew up. All her crew were saved. The other two fireships cut their cables and escaped the flames.

In May 1782 Commander Sir James Barclay assumed command. She was paid off in March 1783. The Navy sold her at Woolwich on 21 March. The auction price of £2395 included her masts, yards, rigging, and some stores.

=== Whaler ===
In August 1785 Lloyd's List reported that Harpy, Marshall, master, was off Whitby, returning from Greenland with one "fish" (whale). Then on 8 March 1786 Harpy, Marshall, master, sailed from the Downs bound for "David Straits" (Davis Strait). In July Harpy, Marshall, was off Whitby, returning from Davis Straits with five fish. A second report had her arriving at Gravesend on 17 August from Greenland with six fish.

Harpy first appeared in Lloyd's Register in 1786 with J. Marshall, master, J. Dawse, owner, and trade London–Greenland. On 26 February 1787 Harpy, Marshall, master, sailed for Davis Strait. On 29 August they were back at Gravesend. Almost a year later Harpy, Stevens, master, was at Gravesend again, having taken four fish, at Greenland.

Harpy does not appear under that name in a compendium of all merchant vessels registered at Liverpool in 1786–1788.

In 1788 Harpy underwent a large repair. Captain John Inskip and Harpy, Hattersley & Co., owners, were at the Downs on 23 October 1788, waiting to sail for the South Seas. By 11 March 1789 she was at the Cape of Good Hope. She returned on 14 July 1790. While she was on her voyage, her owner had changed from Hattersley to Stephens. Although there is no confirmation from Lloyd's List's ship arrival and departure (SAD) data, Lloyd's Register (1791) still carried her as being in the Southern Whale Fishery. (Note: John Inskip died in 1791.)

=== Merchantman ===
On 5 January 1792 Harpy, Wilson, master, sailed from the Downs for Sierra Leone. Lloyd's Register (1792) showed Harpy with James, master, Sierra Leone Company, owner, and trade London–Sierra Leone. She had undergone a good repair in 1791. The Sierra Leone Company had been established in March 1791 and had purchased several vessels. These vessels supported the colony the Company had established in Sierra Leone and that its settlers, free blacks from Canada that the company had transported there, named Freetown. Lloyd's List for 4 May 1792 reported that Amy, Patterson, Lapwing, Robinson, Harpy, Wilson, and 15 ships from Halifax, Nova Scotia ha arrived in Sierra Leone. (It was this fleet of 15 vessels that brought the settlers.) Harpy arrived back in England in December. Lloyd's Register (1795) showed Harpy with D.Telford, master, the Sierra Leone Company, owner, and trade London–Sierra Leone.

=== Capture ===
In September 1794 a French naval squadron comprising the razee Experiment under the command of lieutenant de vaisseau Arnaud, Vigilance, Félicité, Mutine, Pervie, and Mutine was cruising the West African coast, destroying British factories and shipping. Harpy, Telford, master, and another Sierra Leone Company ship, Thornton, Sayford, master were only two of the many vessels the squadron captured.

On 9 October 1794 Harpy arrived at Cape Sierra Leone with passengers and some £10,000 in goods. When Telford saw that the Company's settlement had been destroyed he attempted to flee. Harpy was starting to gain on the vessel that the French sent to pursue her when the wind failed. Telford immediately struck when the French overtook her. The French plundered Harpy and her passengers. On 13 October the French departed, taking Harpy with them. (Note: The French gave Thornton to an American slave trader named Mariner, who had assisted them.)

=== French service ===
The French Navy took Harpy into service as Harcourt. In 1795 she was renamed Harpie. She was deleted from the lists in 1796.

== Post-script ==
The Debits and Credits accounts for the Sierra Leone Company dated 31 December 1795 included as credits money expected from the underwriters for Harpy's cargo. The Company had expected insurance largely to cover Hardy and her cargo.
