= Thornton (1793 ship) =

History

Great Britain
- Name: Thornton
- Owner: Sierra Leone Company
- Launched: 1793, Southampton
- Captured: 1794

General characteristics
- Tons burthen: 31 (bm)
- Sail plan: Cutter

Thornton was a cutter launched in 1793 at Southampton that the Sierra Leone Company purchased to assist in their activities. A French squadron destroyed her at Sierra Leone in September 1794.

Lloyd's Register (1794) showed Thornton, cutter, with F.Syford, master, Sierra Leone Company, owner, and trade Cork–Sierra Leone. The Sierra Leone Company had been established in March 1791 and had purchased several vessels. These vessels supported the colony the company had established in Sierra Leone and that its settlers, free blacks from Canada that the company had transported there, named Freetown. Lloyd's List for 4 May 1792 reported that Amy, Patterson, Lapwing, Robinson, Harpy, Wilson, and 15 ships from Halifax, Nova Scotia had arrived at Sierra Leone. (It was this fleet of 15 vessels that brought the settlers.)

In October 1793, the company sent Ocean to cruise from Bissau to Cape Mesurado. Her mission was to visit the forts on the way to purchase African commodities and bring them back to Freetown. There the company would warehouse them until it could export them on vessels visiting Freetown. The trial apparently was a success. In April 1794 the company expanded the program. Thornton sailed to the Gold Coast to trade in gold and ivory. Other vessels were sent on similar missions.

In September 1794 a French naval squadron comprising the razee Experiment under the command of lieutenant de vaisseau Arnaud, Vigilance, Félicité, Pervie, and Mutine was cruising the West African coast, destroying British factories and shipping. Among many other vessels, they captured two company vessels, Harpy and Thornton, Sayford, master. They retained Harpy.

On 6 October 1794, after setting fire to the company's remaining buildings, the French gave "the Company's schooner" Thornton to an American slave trader named Mariner as a reward for his services to them.
