= HMS Unicorn =

Eleven ships of the Royal Navy have borne the name HMS Unicorn, after the mythological creature, the unicorn:

- English ship Unicorn (1544) was a 36-gun ship captured from Scotland in 1544 and sold in 1555.
- English ship Unicorn (1634) was a 56-gun ship launched in 1634 and sold in 1687.
- HMS Unicorn (1665) (or Little Unicorn) was an 18-gun fire ship originally in Dutch service as the Eenhoorn. She was captured in 1665 and expended on 4 June 1666, on the fourth day of the Four Days' Battle.
- HMS Unicorn (1666) was a 6-gun purchased in 1666 and sunk as a blockship at Chatham on 11 June 1667, together with five other vessels, in a futile attempt to block the Dutch from advancing up the River Medway.
- HMS Unicorn (1748) was a 28-gun sixth rate launched in 1748 and broken up in 1771.
- HMS Unicorn (1776) was a 20-gun post ship launched in 1776. The French frigate Andromaque captured her on 4 October 1780 took her into service as La Licorne. HMS Resource recaptured her in April 1781. The Royal Navy took her back into service as Unicorn Prize; she was broken up at Deptford in 1787.
- HMS Unicorn (1782) was a 36-gun fifth rate launched in 1782. She was renamed HMS Thalia in 1783 and was broken up in 1814.
- HMS Unicorn (1794) was a 32-gun fifth rate launched in 1794 and broken up in 1815.
- HMS Unicorn (1824) is a Leda-class frigate, launched in 1824 and converted to a powder hulk in 1860. She was a Royal Naval Reserve drill ship from 1873. She was renamed Unicorn II in 1939 and Cressy from 1941 until 1959. She was handed over to a preservation society in 1968 and is preserved in Dundee as a museum ship.
- HMS Unicorn (I72) was an aircraft maintenance carrier, launched in 1941 and broken up around 1960.
- HMS Unicorn (S43) was an Upholder-class submarine launched in 1992. She was sold to Canada in 2001, who renamed her HMCS Windsor.

== Battle honours ==
Ships named Unicorn have earned the following battle honours:

- Armada 1588
- Cádiz 1596
- Porto Farina 1655
- Santa Cruz 1657
- Lowestoft 1665
- Orfordness 1666
- Sole Bay 1672
- Schooneveld 1673
- Texel 1673
- "Vestale" 1761
- "Tribune" 1796
- Basque Roads 1809
- Salerno 1943
- Okinawa 1945
- Korea 1950–53

== See also ==
- HMCS Unicorn, a Canadian Forces Naval Reserve division in Saskatoon, Saskatchewan
- French ship Licorne, similarly named ships in the French Navy
- Unicorn (Tintin), a fictional ship of the French Royal Navy featured in The Adventures of Tintin.
