= French ship Licorne =

Twelve ships of the French Navy have borne the name Licorne, the French word for Unicorn:

== Ships named Licorne ==
- Licorne (1643), a fluyt captured from Holland
- Licorne (1689), a fireship
- Licorne (1691), an 8-gun fluyt
- Licorne (1702), a 52-gun ship of the line
- Licorne (1756), a 32-gun frigate, lead ship of her class. Captured in 1778 by HMS America and taken into British service as HMS Licorne, sold in 1783.
- Licorne (1780), a 20-gun corvette, formerly HMS Unicorn, that Andromaque captured in 1780. HMS Resource recaptured her off Cape Blaise in 1781 and the Royal Navy took her back into service as Unicorn Prize. She was broken up in 1787.
- Licorne (1795), a fluyt, formerly the Indiaman Lambert
- Licorne (1803), a transport
- Licorne (1811), a fluyt, lead ship of her class
- Licorne (1834), a transport
- Licorne (1946), a tug.
- Licorne (1981), a Diver propulsion vehicle.

== Ships with similar names ==
- Licorne II (1914), an auxiliary patrol boat.

== Fictional ships ==
- Unicorn (Tintin) (French: La Licorne), a fictional sailing ship of the French Royal Navy in the French-language Belgian comic book Tintin

== See also ==
- HMS Unicorn

== Notes and references ==
Notes

Bibliography

- Roche, Jean-Michel (2005a). Dictionnaire des bâtiments de la flotte de guerre française de Colbert à nos jours. Vol. 1. Group Retozel-Maury Millau. ISBN 978-2-9525917-0-6. OCLC 165892922.
- Roche, Jean-Michel (2005b). Dictionnaire des bâtiments de la flotte de guerre française de Colbert à nos jours. Vol. 2. Group Retozel-Maury Millau. ISBN 978-2-9525917-0-6. OCLC 165892922.
