= French ship Experiment =

Ship of the line of the French Navy

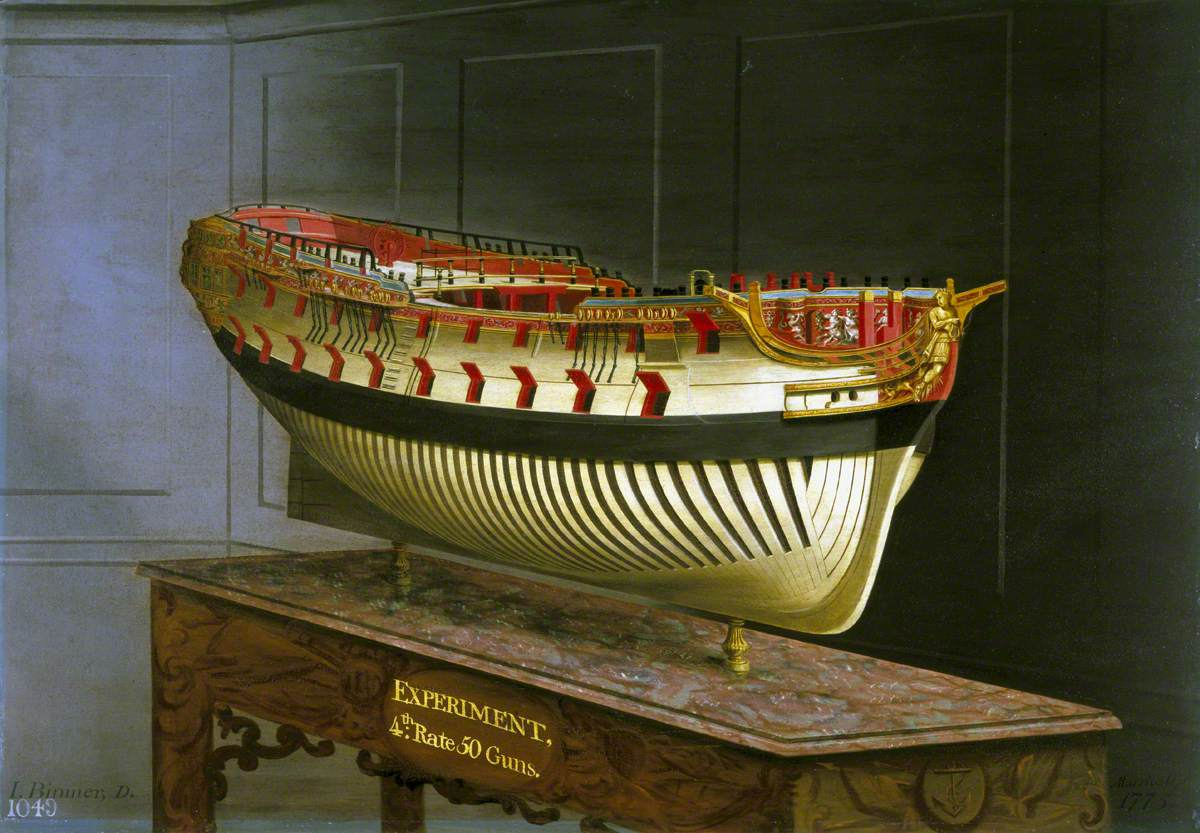
- Painting of a model of Experiment, by Joseph Marshall

History

Great Britain
- Name: HMS Experiment
- Builder: Deptford
- Laid down: December 1772
- Launched: 23 August 1774

France
- Name: Experiment
- Commissioned: 24 September 1779
- Captured: 1805

General characteristics
- Type: 50-gun ship of the line
- Displacement: 1,400 tonneaux
- Tons burthen: 700 port tonneaux
- Length: 44.2 metres
- Beam: 11.7 metres
- Draught: 7.5 metres
- Armament: 44 to 50 guns

HMS Experiment was a 50-gun fourth-rate ship of the line of the Royal Navy. Captured by Sagittaire during the American Revolutionary War, she was recommissioned in the French Navy, where she served into the 1800s.

== British service ==
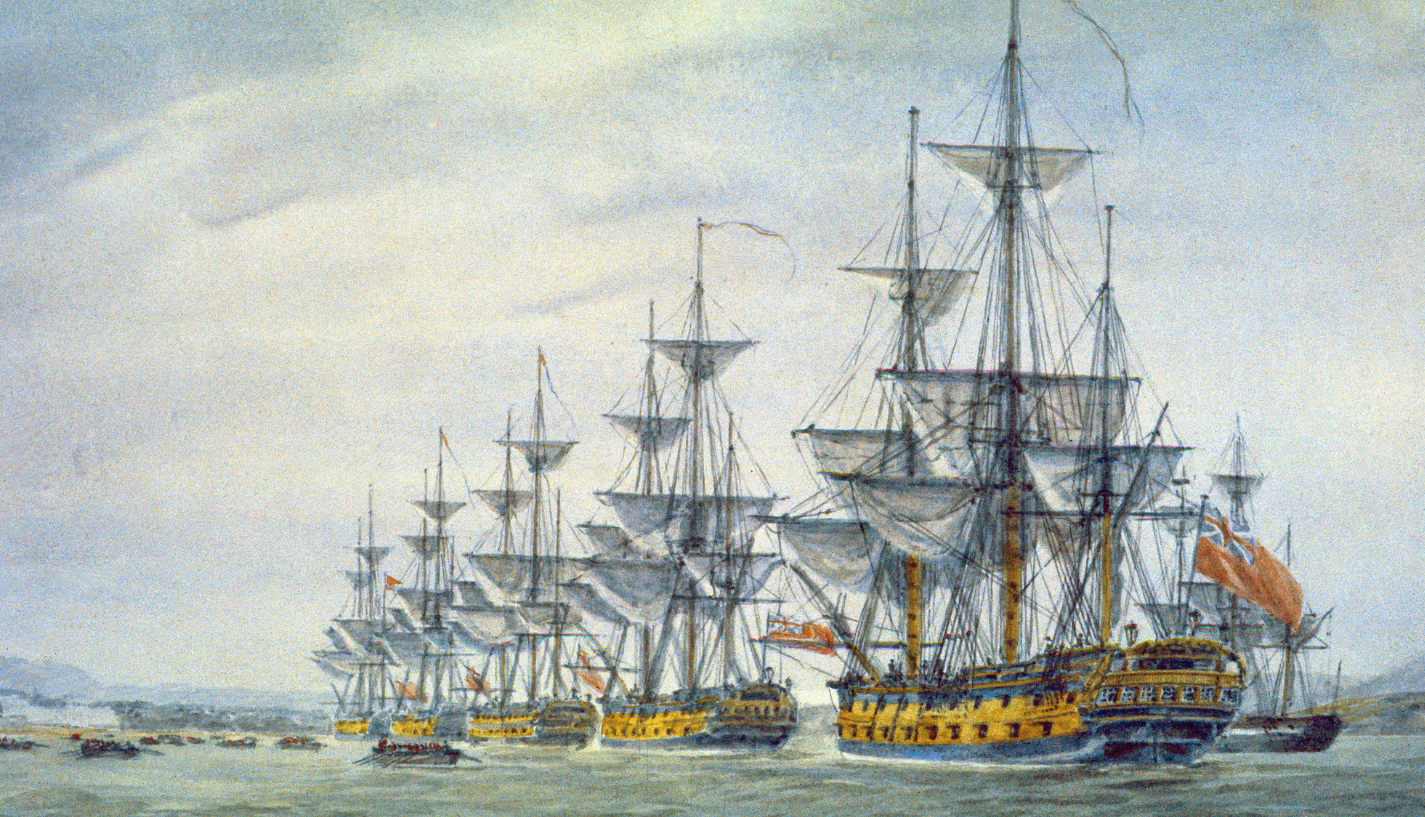
Experiment at the British occupation of Newport, Rhode Island, on 8 December 1776

Sometime in January/February, 1778 she rescued the crew of the armed Brigantine Rawleigh as the ship sank. On 6 January, 1778 her tender "Hawk" captured sloop Lee in Delaware Bay off the Maurice River with credit for the prize going to Experiment. On 8 January, 1778, under the command of Captain Sir James Wallace, she captured merchant sloop Morning Star approximately 475 miles off Cape Henlopen. On 11 January she captured Danish flagged schooner Willing Maid 294 miles off Cape Henlopen sailing to North Carolina from Curacao. On 13 January, 1778 she captured brigantine Sally approximately 160 miles off Cape Henlopen. On 14 January, 1778 she captured Dutch ship Vrouw Margaretta 130 miles off Cape Henlopen. On 6 February she captured Rhode Island privateer sloop Montgomery 200 miles off Sandy Hook (39°00′N 72°00′W). On 11 February she captured sloop Dolphin 218 miles off Sandy Hook, Dolphin sent to New York but was wrecked on Long Island in a snow storm between March 1 and 7. Sometime in February she captured schooner Newport. On 11 May 1778, still Captained by Sir James Wallace, she captured New Hampshire Privateer "Portsmouth" off Chedabucto Head, Nova Scotia. On 28 May 1778 she captured the 16 gun Massachusetts privateer brig "Wexford" near Cape Sable Island ((43°10′N 65°00′W)). On 9 June, 1778 she captured the brig "Young Benjamin" (or brigantine Little Benjamin). On 11 June 1778 she captured brig "Neptune" off Cape Cod, she was recaptured later. Later that day she chased Massachusetts Privateer "Franklin" off Matinicus Island, Maine, but she escaped. On 12 June 1778 she was chased down by an unknown sail that turned out to be HMS Blonde, Blonde transferred a packet to her. Later that day she captured schooner "Amity" that was plundered and burned. She captured 3 prizes off Cape Henry in January, 1779. When the French attempted to invade Jersey in 1779, Admiral Mariot Arbuthnot, who had left Spithead with a squadron escorting a convoy en route to North America, sent the convoy in to Torbay and proceeded to the relief of Jersey with his ships. However, when he arrived he found that Captain Ford of HMS Unicorn had the situation well in hand. The French flotilla retreated to Saint-Malo, but then anchored at Coutances.

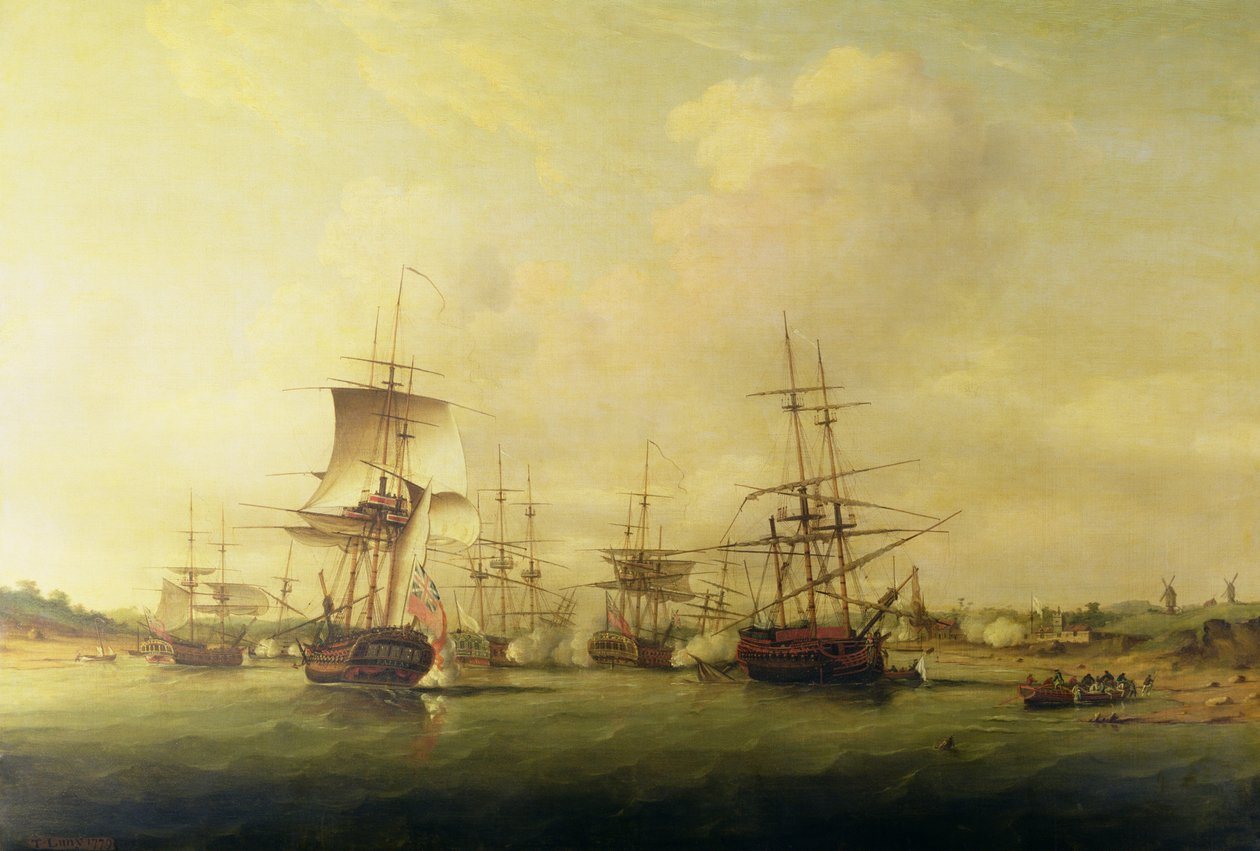
HMS Experiment in the action of 13 May 1779

A British squadron under Wallace in Experiment attacked the French in the action of 13 May 1779 in Cancale Bay. The British managed to set Valeur (6 guns), Écluse (8), and Guêpe (6) on fire, though the French were able to salvage Ecluse and Guêpe after the British withdrew. The British also captured the 32-gun frigate Danae along with a brig, and a sloop. (Note: Other vessels in the squadron consisted of the armed ship HMS Leith, the sloops HMS Cygnet, Fortune, and Wasp, and the cutter True Briton. The hired armed ship Heart of Oak apparently was present in some capacity both at the relief and the subsequent action.)

== French service ==
On 23 September, Sagittaire captured the 50-gun HMS Experiment, which carried 118,819 piastres. Experiment was coppered and had excellent nautical qualities. In late 1779, she returned to Toulon, along with Sagittaire.

In 1780, Experiment was captained by Martelly Chautard. On 1 May 1780, she departed Marseille, escorting 33 merchantmen to Saint-Pierre de la Martinique. She arrived on 16 June and joined a squadron under Bouillé. She then took part in the Invasion of Tobago in June 1781.

In early September 1781, she was part of a division stationed off James River and York River to secure communications channels between Grasse's squadron and Saint-Simon's expeditionary corps, along with Glorieux, Triton and Vaillant, and the frigates Andromaque and Diligente.

In early 1782, command of Experiment went to Charles de Médine. (Note: Either from late January or from February.) In March 1782, Médine transferred to Réfléchi and Experiment was under Fleuriot de Langle, with La Monneraye as first officer.

In March, Experiment departed France to join the French squadron off Rhode Island, along with Sagittaire, under Montluc de la Bourdonnaye. In April 1782, De Grasse sent them to escort a convoy and put them out of danger from Hood's squadron.

In 1786, Experiment cruised off Africa with Pandour, Boulonnaise and Rossignol.

In 1794, Experiment was razéed into a frigate. In September 1794, under Lieutenant Arnaud, she was part of a division also comprising Vigilance, Félicité, Épervier, and Mutine, cruising the West African coast, destroying British factories and shipping. Among many other vessels they captured two Sierra Leone Company vessels, Harpy and Thornton, Sayford, master. They retained Harpy but destroyed Thornton. In August or December, Experiment captured a ship, possibly Princess Royal.

== Fate ==
Experiment was used as a horse transport from December 1797, and hulked in Rochefort on 23 August 1802.
