= HMS True Briton (1778) =

British cutter navy vessel

History

Great Britain
- Name: HMS True Briton
- Acquired: April 1778 by purchase
- Captured: December 1780

France
- Name: Tartare
- Acquired: December 1780 by capture
- Captured: February 1782

Great Britain
- Name: HMS True Briton
- Acquired: February 1782 by capture
- Fate: Sold 1785

General characteristics
- Tons burthen: 1889/94 (bm)
- Length: Overall: 74 ft 6 3/4 in (22.7 m); Keel: 54 ft 4 in (16.6 m)
- Beam: 25 ft 6 1/8 in (7.8 m)
- Depth of hold: 9 ft 11 in (3.0 m)
- Complement: 60
- Armament: 10 × 4-pounder guns + 12 × ½-pounder swivel guns

HMS True Briton was a cutter the Royal Navy purchased in 1778. In 1779 she participated in a successful operation that resulted in the capture of a French frigate and several other naval vessels. The French Navy captured True Briton in 1780. She became the mercantile Tartare. The Royal Navy recaptured her and recommissioned her as HMS True Briton. The Navy laid her up in 1783 and sold her in 1785.

== Career ==
The Navy purchase True Briton in April 1778 for £ 3,240 7s 7d. She underwent fitting at Deptford between 29 April and 18 September 1778.

Lieutenant Charles Cobb commissioned True Briton in July 1779 for the Channel Islands. In 1780 she was under the command of Lieutenant the Honourable Patrick Napier.

On 13 May 1779 True Briton was part of a squadron commanded by Captain Sir James Wallace in HMS Experiment that captured the French frigate Danae, and a brig and cutter, in Cancale Bay. The squadron had sailed from Portsmouth to the relief of Jersey after the failed French invasion. Other vessels in the squadron consisted of the sloops HMS Cygnet, Fortune, and Wasp, and the hired armed ship Leith.

Capture: True Briton was returning to England from France in November 1780 when she got caught in a storm off Lisbon that cost her her bowsprit. Then On 2 December she was in the Bay of Biscay when another storm took away her masts. She was proceeding towards Ireland under a jury mast made of spars and booms when on 5 December she encountered the French 32-gun privateer Bougainville. Napier had no choice but to strike.

Recapture: In February 1782, HMS Arethusa captured the French ship Tartare, of fourteen 6-pounder guns. There are alternate accounts of Tartare's origins. French sources state that she was the former British privateer Tartar, which the French ships Aimable and Diligente had captured in September 1780. The Royal Navy took Tartare into service as HMS True Briton. Lloyds List reported that Tartar was the former British cutter True Briton.

HMS True Briton: Tartar underwent fitting at Portsmouth between February and August 1782, and was recommissioned in June under Lieutenant Francis Loveday, for the Channel Islands.

Disposal: True Briton was fitted for Ordinary between April and November 1783. The Navy sold her at Sheerness on 9 June 1785 for £205.
