= Bartholomew Rowley =

Royal Navy Admiral (1764–1811)

Admiral Bartholomew Rowley
- Born: 10 June 1764
- Died: 7 October 1811 (aged 47); Jamaica
- Relatives: Sir William Rowley (grandfather); Sir Joshua Rowley (father)
- Military career
- Allegiance: United Kingdom
- Branch: Royal Navy
- Service years: 1777–1811
- Rank: Admiral
- Commands: HMS Resource; HMS Diamond; HMS Penelope; HMS Cumberland; HMS Ramillies; The Downs; Jamaica Station
- Conflicts: American Revolutionary War; French Revolutionary Wars; Battle of Hyères Islands; Napoleonic Wars

Admiral Bartholomew Samuel Rowley (10 June 1764 – 7 October 1811) was a British naval officer who served during the American, French Revolutionary and Napoleonic Wars.

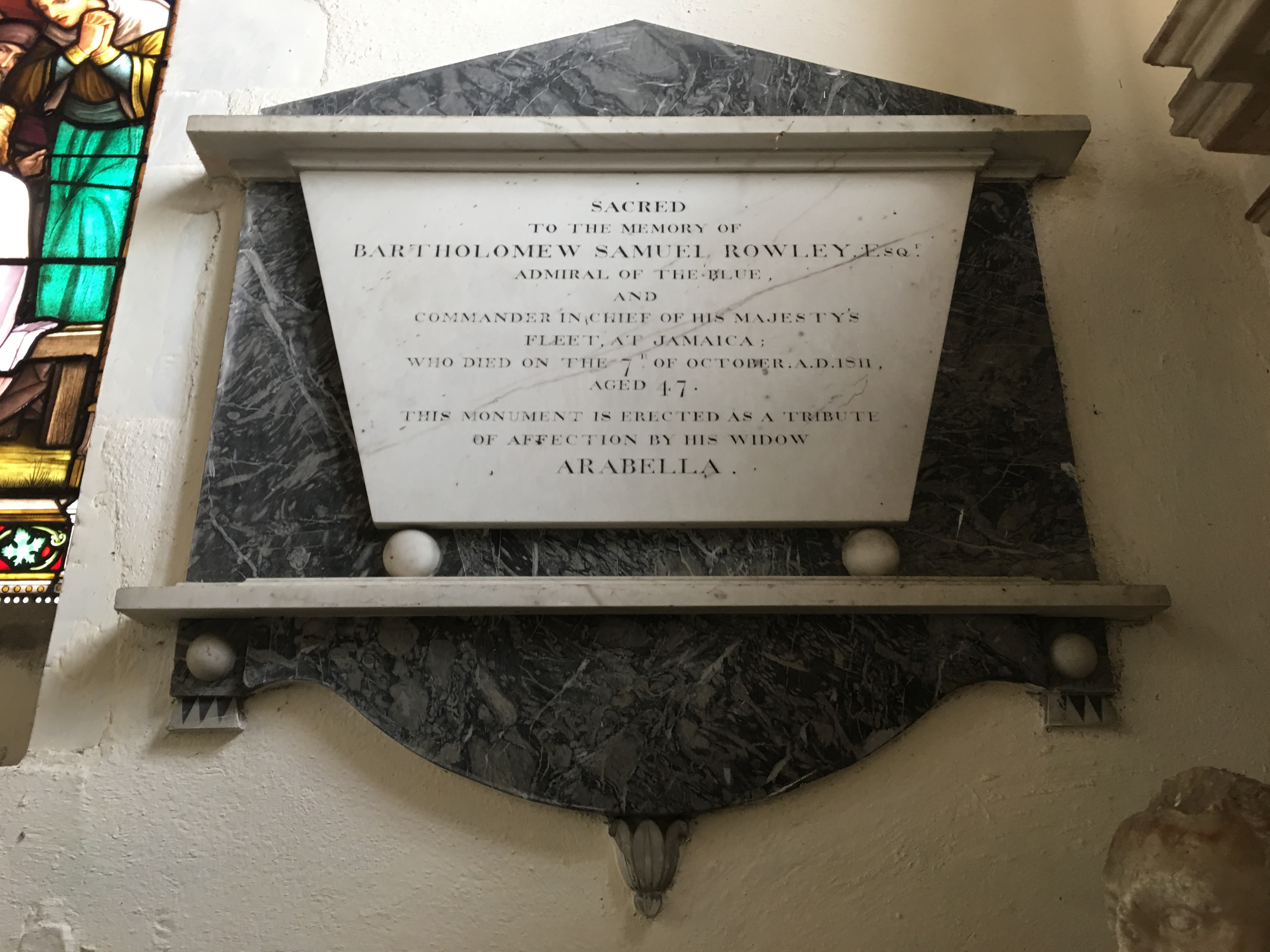
Memorial to Bartholomew Rowley in St Mary's church, Stoke-by-Nayland, Suffolk

== Biography ==
He was the second son of Vice-Admiral Sir Joshua Rowley and was a member of a notable naval dynasty. His grandfather was Admiral of the Fleet Sir William Rowley, while his younger brother was Admiral Sir Charles Rowley. His cousins included Admiral Sir Josias Rowley, Rear-Admiral Samuel Campbell Rowley, Vice-Admiral Sir Joshua Ricketts Rowley, and Admiral of the Fleet Sir George Martin. His sister, Philadelphia Rowley, was married to Admiral Sir Charles Cotton.

Rowley attended Harrow School from 1775 and then entered the Navy. By 1780, he was serving as a lieutenant aboard his father's flagship, the 74-gun Conqueror. On 31 January 1781, he was made post-captain (before his 17th birthday!) in order to command the 28-gun sixth-rate frigate Resource. On 20 April 1781, Resource captured the 20-gun French frigate Licorne in an action lasting 1½ hours. She proved to be the former HMS Unicorn, which had been captured on 4 September 1780 by a French frigate and two ships of the line off Tortuga.

In October 1782, Rowley took command of the fifth-rate 32-gun frigate Diamond, where he served until August 1783. However, with the end of the American Revolutionary War in September 1783, Rowley found himself, like many other naval officers, unemployed on half-pay for nearly a decade. By the time of the outbreak of the French Revolutionary War in February 1793, Rowley was back at sea in command of the 32-gun frigate Penelope, serving in the Jamaica Squadron, under the command of Commodore John Ford. On 16 April 1793 Penelope captured the French aviso Le Goéland, commanded by lieutenant de vaisseau Leissègues de Pennenyum, en route from Cap-Français to Jérémie.

In late 1793 Ford took advantage of the Haitian Revolution to occupy several ports in the French colony of Saint-Domingue (now Haiti). On 20 November 1793, Penelope sailed from Môle-Saint-Nicolas, having received news that the French 36-gun frigate L'Inconstante was sailing from Port-au-Prince, escorting a large merchant ship. The next day, Penelope met the 32-gun frigate Iphigenia, and the two ships proceeded towards Port-au-Prince. However they learned that L'Inconstante had sailed to Petit Trou with two mail ships but was soon expected to return to port. They intended to cut her out of the harbour of Port-au-Prince, but on the night of 25 November, they met her at sea. After a brisk exchange of broadsides, L'Inconstante surrendered. Penelope had only one man killed and seven wounded, while L'Inconstante had nine killed, including the Captain and the First Lieutenant, and 17 wounded. On 2 January 1794, Ford sent Penelope into Port-au-Prince under a flag of truce where Rowley demanded the surrender of the island from the French Civil Commissioner Léger-Félicité Sonthonax. He refused, and the British promptly blockaded the island. After the capture of Port-au-Prince on 4 June 1794, Rowley and Lieutenant-Colonel John Whitelocke were sent back to England with dispatches aboard the sloop Fly.

In August 1794. Rowley was appointed captain of the 74-gun Cumberland, taking part in the Battle of Hyères Islands on 13 July 1795, off the southern coast of France, when a British fleet under Admiral William Hotham engaged a French fleet. Cumberland was in the van of the British fleet, accepting the surrender of the French 74 Alcide, before Hotham ordered the fleet to disengage.

From July 1797 until October 1798 Rowley commanded the 74-gun Ramillies, capturing the French brig L'Arrogant. Rowley was promoted to Rear-Admiral on 14 February 1799, and to Vice-Admiral on 9 November 1805.

He was appointed Commander-in-Chief at The Downs in 1807 and Commander-in-Chief at the Jamaica Station in 1808, and sailed from England in July 1808 aboard Polyphemus, commanded by Captain William Pryce Cumby. As C-in-C Rowley resided ashore, flying his flag in Shark. He was promoted to Admiral of the Blue on 31 July 1810, and died at Jamaica on 7 October 1811.

Military offices
Preceded by John Holloway	Commander-in-Chief, The Downs; 1807–1808	Succeeded by George Campbell
Preceded by James Richard Dacres	Commander-in-Chief, Jamaica Station; 1809–1811	Succeeded by James Giles Vashon
