= HMS Phoenix (1759) =

Fifth-rate ship of the Royal Navy

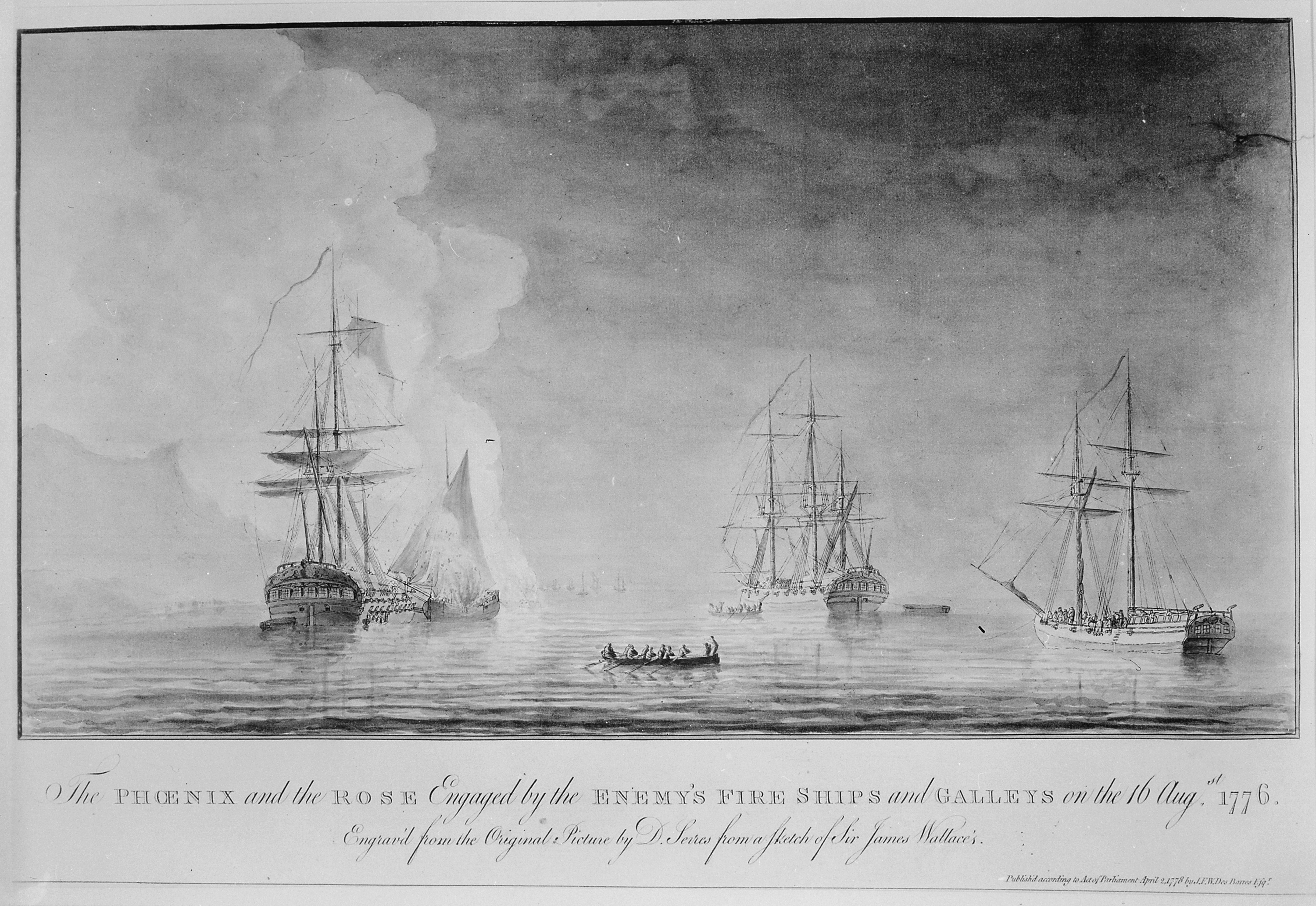
- The engraving The Phoenix and the Rose engaged by the enemy's fire ships and galleys on the 16 Aug. 1776. by Dominic Serres after a sketch by Sir James Wallace

History

Great Britain
- Name: HMS Phoenix
- Ordered: 5 January 1758
- Builder: John & Robert Batson, Limehouse
- Laid down: February 1758
- Launched: 25 June 1759
- Completed: By 26 July 1759
- Fate: Wrecked 4 October 1780

General characteristics
- Class & type: 44-gun fifth-rate ship
- Tons burthen: 84267/94 bm
- Length: 140 ft 9 in (42.90 m) (gundeck); 116 ft 8 in (35.56 m) (keel)
- Beam: 36 ft 9.75 in (11.2205 m)
- Depth of hold: 15 ft 11.5 in (4.864 m)
- Sail plan: Full-rigged ship
- Complement: 280
- Armament: Lower gundeck: 20 × 18-pounder guns; Upper gundeck: 20 × 9-pounder guns; QD: 4 × 6-pounder guns

HMS Phoenix was a 44-gun fifth-rate ship of the Royal Navy. She was launched in 1759 and sunk in 1780 and saw service during the American War of Independence.

== Launch ==
Phoenix was launched in 1759 under Captain Prince Edward, Duke of York and Albany In October 1760 she was en route from the Orkneys in northern England when she ran ashore at Orford Ness in Suffolk. Phoenix remained hard on shore until the crew were able to lighten her by throwing her cannons overboard and then waiting for the high tide.

== Activities in North America ==
=== Naval operations ===
Phoenix saw service during the American War of Independence under Captain Hyde Parker, Jr. The ship was assigned to New York and by 5 June 1776 was laying off Sandy Hook, New Jersey with a small flotilla of ships. Later that month, Phoenix captured at least three ships and disrupted an American attack on a lighthouse near Sandy Hook. In the early days of July 1776, Phoenix, along with HMS Rose and HMS Greyhound moved toward Red Hook, Brooklyn and anchored at Gravesend, Brooklyn. On 8 July 1776, Parker was ordered to assume command of HMS Rose and move upriver from New York City.

She, along with HMS Rose and three smaller ships, launched an attack on New York City on 12 July 1776. During that attack, Phoenix and the other ships easily passed rebel defences and bombarded urban New York for two hours. This action largely confirmed Continental fears that the Royal Navy could act with relative impunity when attacking deep-water ports. On 4 August, Phoenix and Rose repulsed the assault of an improvised American fleet of row galleys and a whaleboat near Tarrytown. Phoenix continued to harass patriot positions along the Hudson River till 16 August when she withdrew back to the waters off of Staten Island. Maps from that autumn show Phoenix and Rose again in the waters south of Manhattan. On 9 October, 1776 she was in action on the Hudson River, with HMS Roebuck and HMS Tartar, forced her way upstream, whilst engaging, on either side, the two forts of Washington and Lee. The next day she, HMS Roebuck, and HMS Tartar captured the abandoned Connecticut Navy galley "Crane" in the Hudson River. On 7 January, 1778 she captured French brig Gineveve off Cape Henry. On 10 January, 1778 she captured and destroyed merchant brig Polly off Cape Henry. On 17 January, 1778 she captured merchant sloop Sally off Cape Henry. She captured 2 prizes off Cape Henry in February, 1777. One was the schooner Betsy on 3 February. On 19 February, 1778 she captured sloop Sally 280 Leagues off Martha's Vineyard.

=== Counterfeiting ===
Phoenix was also involved in a kind of currency war. During the Revolutionary War, the Continental Congress authorized the printing of paper currency called continental currency. As early as January 1776, John and George Folliott began counterfeiting Continental $30 bills on Phoenix. The counterfeiting operation on Phoenix ran until at least April 1777. The counterfeit notes could be purchased for the price of the paper they were printed on. Inflation was indeed a major problem for the rebelling colonists, reaching monthly levels of 47 percent by November 1779. And the Phoenix counterfeiting contributed, at least in part, to such staggering currency problems.

== Loss ==
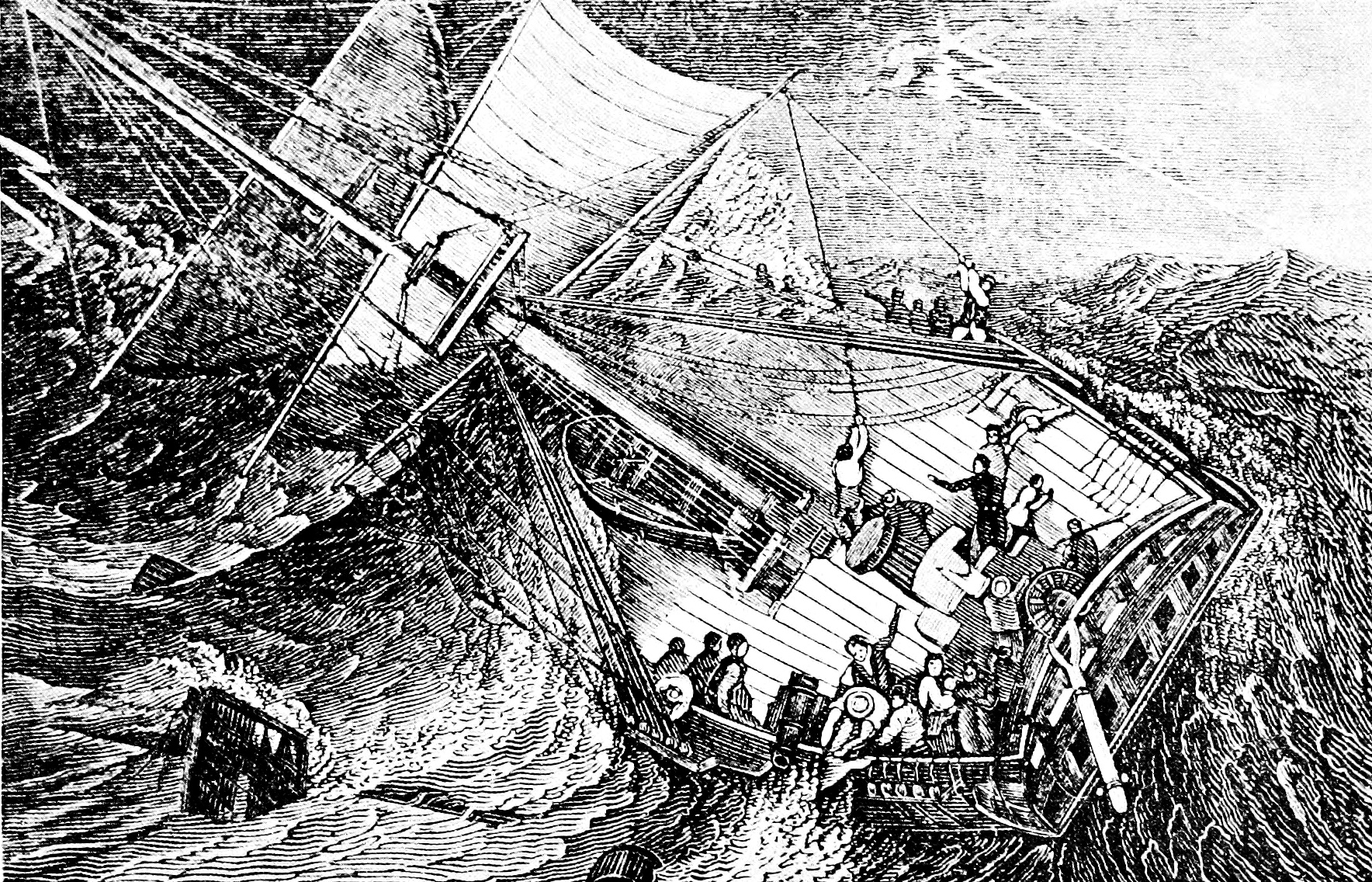
Perilous situation of the ship

Phoenix, under Captain Hyde Parker, sunk on the night of 4 October 1780. The loss occurred during a major hurricane that disrupted the British fleet in the West Indies. The loss was memorably recorded by Lieutenant Archer in a letter of 6 November 1780:

If I were to write forever, I could not give you an idea of it; the sea of fire, running as it were the Alps or Peaks of Teneriffe; the wind roaring louder than thunder, the whole made more terrible, if possible, by a very uncommon kind of blue lightning; the poor ship very much pressed, yet doing what she could, shaking her sides and groaning at every stroke.

Before she sank, the crew cut the mainmast away after the storm felled it.

Over the course of three days, the crew was able to land provisions and stores on the shore of Cuba, a hostile territory then a possession of Spain. Hyde Parker ordered his crew to repair the damaged cutter and then dispatched it toward Montego Bay in Jamaica. A rescue mission of three fishing boats and, later, the sloop Porcupine evacuated the survivors. Phoenix had lost 20 men when the mainmast fell. The surviving 240 men reached Montego Bay safely on 15 October.
