= HMS Leith (1777) =

Naval ship of Great Britain

History

Great Britain
- Name: Leith
- Namesake: Leith
- Launched: 1744, or 1746
- Commissioned: November 1777
- Decommissioned: July 1782
- Fate: Last listed 1783

General characteristics
- Tons burthen: 333, or 335 (bm)
- Armament: 20 × 6-pounder guns

HMS Leith, also known as HM hired armed ship Leith, was launched in 1744 or 1746 in the British "Plantations", more specifically, the colony of Maryland. From 1764 to 1777 she was a Greenlandman, that is a whaler, in the waters east of Greenland. Between 1777 and 1782 she served the Royal Navy as a transport and hired armed naval ship. She was last listed in 1783.

== Service ==
Missing volumes and missing pages in extant volumes of Lloyd's Register (LR) mean that there are few records of Leith's early years. Leith, of Leith, first appeared in LR in 1764. Between 1763 and 1772, Leith's master was A. Chiene. From 1773 to 1777 her master was Ballantyne.

Year	Master	Owner	Trade	Source
1764	Al.Chiene	D.Loch & Co.	Leith–Greenland	LR

Lloyd's List reported in July 1763 that Leith had arrived at Leith from Greenland. She carried the crew of Edinburgh, which had been lost in the ice.

Year	Whales	Tons of whale oil	Whale bone (tons)	Whale bone (CWT)	Notes
1763	1	14	0	11	
1764	0	0	0	0	Poor season due to strong winds from E and NE.
1765	4	40	2	5	
1766	1				
1767	0	0	0	0	
1768	4.5				+90 seals
1769	5	24	1	9	
1770	0	0	0	0	
1771	0	0	0	0	
1772	2	20	1	5	
1773	1	8	0	7	
1774	2	33	1	18	
1775	0	0	0	0	
1776	4	32	1	7	Favourable hunting conditions but small whales
1777	1				Leith suffered damage from ice. Fear of impressment led 18 seamen to desert

Year	Master	Owner	Trade	Source & notes
1778	W.Ballantine; J.Orrock	Walker & Co.	Leith–Greenland; C.Leith transport	LR; repairs 1772, & new deck and large repair 1777

Hired armed ship: In November 1777 the Royal Navy hired Leith. She was under the command of James Orrock. In September 1778 Leith was at Leith Roads, waiting to escort some transports that were to carry Lord Seaforth's Regiment to Jersey. When the soldiers of the regiment found out that they might be sent on to India from Jersey if needed in India, they mutinied. After several days negotiation and the abandonment of any plan to send them on to India, the soldiers returned to service. They embarked at Leith and were carried to Jersey. There in May 1779 the Regiment helped repulse a French invasion.

Commander Peter Rothe was assigned command of Leith in 1779 on the Leith Station. On 13 May of the same year Leith was part of a squadron commanded by Captain Sir James Wallace in HMS Experiment that captured the French frigate Danae, and a brig and cutter, in Cancale Bay. The squadron had sailed from Portsmouth to the relief of Jersey after the failed French invasion. (Note: Other vessels in the squadron consisted of the sloops HMS Cygnet, Fortune, and Wasp, and the cutter True Briton. The British managed to set Valeur (6 guns), Écluse (8), and Guêpe (6) on fire, though the French were able to salvage Guêpe after the British withdrew.)

In August Leith had her rigging removed and her guns taken out in preparation for drydocking. On 17 August word came to the thinly armed station that John Paul Jones was moving to attack Leith in a squadron led by his frigate USS Bonhomme Richard. Rothe had Leith's crew move her guns onto the shore where they were formed into two temporary gun batteries to help defend against the expected attack. Word of the hastily assembled British defences combined with a troublesome squall led Jones to call off the attack, and Leith's batteries were not used.

On 18 March 1781 Captain Rothe sailed Leith from Leith Roads for Shetland as escort to a convoy carrying store, engineers, and artillery and artificers to establish a fort there. Leith was to stop at Aberdeen to pick up troops for the fort.

While serving off Greenland, having recently finished convoying ships to Shetland, Leith captured the 18-gun Dunkirk privateer Necker. Necker initially spotted and chased Leith, who found she could not outrun the privateer and turned to engage her. Necker then mistook Leith for a frigate and began to sail away from her, only to lose her topmast in her haste to escape. Leith was then able to catch up with the privateer which quickly surrendered, having already thrown her guns overboard in an attempt to increase speed. Necker was sent in to Lerwick some time before 28 April. (Note: Necker was a 150-ton ("of load") privateer commissioned in Dunkirk. From July 1779 she cruised under Cornil-Jacques Bart, with 125 men and 18 guns. On her second cruise in 1779 she was under Jean-Félix Houssois. Her third cruise took place in 1781. She was under François Mougin with 88 men, 16 guns, and 4 swivel guns until the British captured her in October 1781. She may have foundered in December 1789.) (Note: Lloyd's List reported in May 1781 that it was the Greenlandman Marianne, Brown, master, that had captured Necker and taken her into Lerwick. Marianne, of London and 300 tons (bm), had been launched on the Thames in 1750. She had been whaling in Davis Strait but then became a privateer.)

On 5 August Leith was present at the Battle of Dogger Bank, still commanded by Rothe, as part of the escort to the convoy that Vice-Admiral Sir Hyde Parker sought to protect in the battle. In mid-August Lloyd's List reported that the armed ship Leith had arrived at Leith with the trade from the Baltic.

Leith was removed from Royal Navy service in July 1782.

Mercantile service:

Year	Master	Owner	Trade	Source & notes
1783	P.Rothe	Walker & Co.	Leith transport	LR; repairs 1772, & new deck and large repair 1777

== Fate ==
Leith was last listed in the 1783 volume of LR.
