= Action of 13 May 1779 =

1779 battle of the Anglo-French War (1778–1783)

- Part of the Anglo-French War
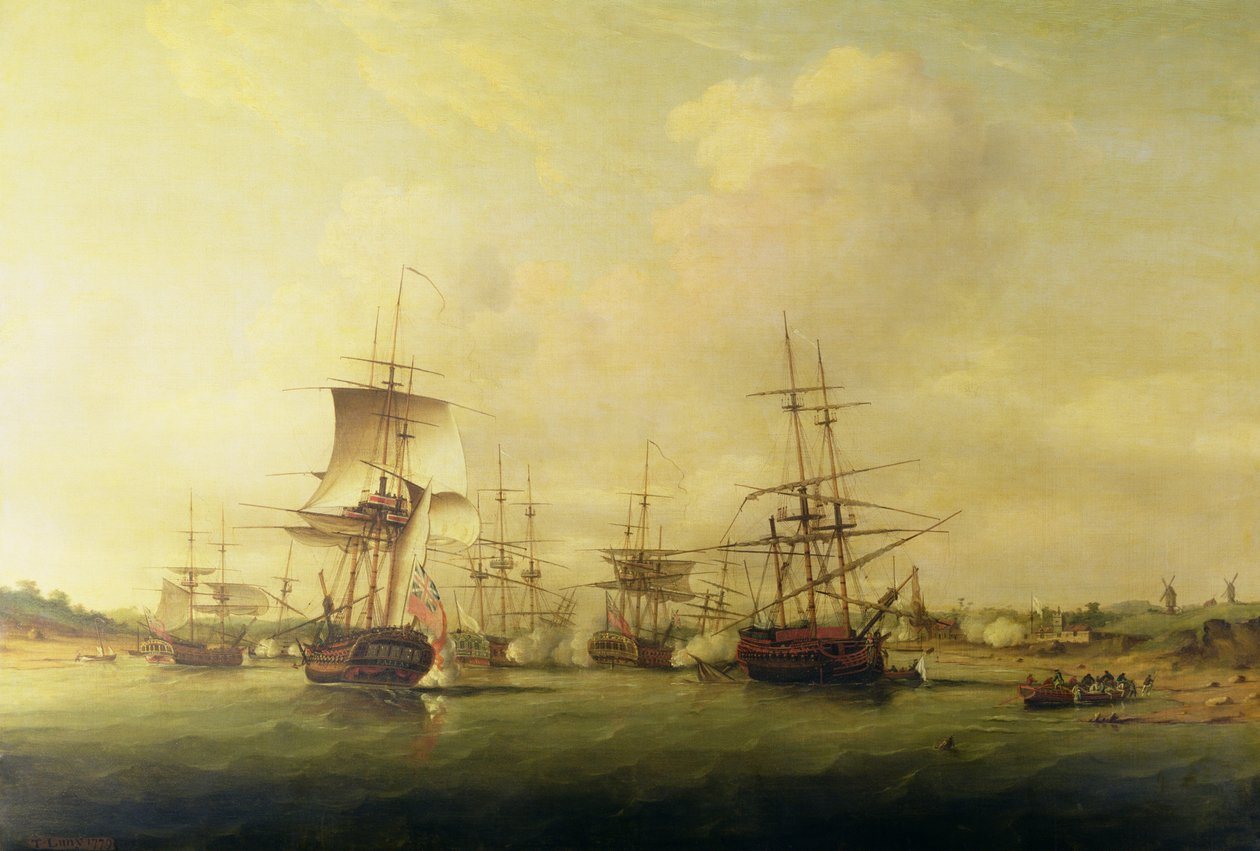
- Action off the coast of France, 13th May 1779; Thomas Luny, 1779
Date	13 May 1779
Location	Cancale Bay, France
Result	British victory

Belligerents
Great Britain	France

Commanders and leaders
Sir James Wallace	Raymond de Kergariou

Strength
1 ship of the line 1 frigate 1 post ship 1 sloop 1 brig	2 frigates 1 corvette 1 gabarre 2 cutters

Casualties and losses
2 killed 15 wounded	1 frigate captured 1 corvette destroyed 1 cutter destroyed

The action of 13 May 1779 was a battle in Cancale Bay, near St Malo, between French and British squadrons. The French force had been part of the escort meant for Karl Heinrich von Nassau-Siegen's invasion of Jersey. When that invasion failed on 1 May the French retreated to Coutances. The British brought together a large squadron under Captain John Gidoin and Captain Sir James Wallace, which then split in two to attack the French squadron against the coast in a pincer manoeuvre.

On 13 May, Gidoin's squadron chased the French from Coutances up the coast to St Malo where Wallace's squadron awaited them. Wallace followed the French into Cancale Bay and attacked them; in response the French beached their ships and went ashore after having been cannonaded for an hour and a half. Wallace captured the frigate Danae and two merchant vessels, but was forced to burn the other vessels because of gunfire from gun batteries on shore. Wallace's squadron suffered minimal casualties. Danae would go on to be bought into service with the Royal Navy; the cutter Guepe and the gabarre Écluse were the only French vessels the French were able to recover and repair.

== Background ==
On 1 May 1779 a French invasion force led by Karl Heinrich von Nassau-Siegen attacked the British crown dependency of Jersey, intending to capture the island through a coup de main. The invasion force was made up of five ships of the line and a number of smaller vessels, together carrying 2,500 soldiers. (Note: Also reported as 1,500 men.) The force attempted to land at Saint Ouen Bay, but a combined force of local militia and the 78th Regiment of Foot, which was garrisoned on the island, repulsed the attack. Unable to proceed with their landings, Nassau-Siegen's force put to sea again.

When the threat from the French force had been at its highest, the island's governor had sent a flyboat to Portsmouth to raise the alarm. While on her way there the boat encountered the squadron of Rear-Admiral Mariot Arbuthnot at 10 a.m. on 2 May that was escorting a large convoy to North America. Arbuthnot took his force to the Channel Islands and arrived at Guernsey on 4 May to find that the invasion force had departed.

While Arbuthnot sailed to relieve the islands, the messenger that had reached him continued on to Portsmouth. Admiral Sir Thomas Pye, the commander-in-chief there, ordered a group of frigates under the command of Captain John Gidoin of the frigate HMS Richmond to sail out to Jersey. Arbuthnot departed the Channel Islands on 6 May, but left behind the 50-gun ship of the line HMS Experiment under Captain Sir James Wallace to temporarily bolster naval forces in the area. Gidoin's force joined with Wallace at Bouley Bay.

== Prelude ==
On 10 May the bailiff of Jersey sent a letter to Gidoin, who was the senior captain still on station, to report that a group of French ships that had been tasked with assisting the invasion, had been seen near the Chausey Islands, situated between the French coast and the Channel Islands. Wallace, who had been preparing to leave the area and re-join Arbuthnot, instead chose to stay with Gidoin. Some small ships were sent out to Chausey to discover the nature of the French ships, and they soon reported that the French force consisted of the frigates Danae and Diane, the gabarre Écluse, the corvette Valeur, and cutter Guepe, and that they were anchored off Coutances. Gidoin and Wallace decided to split their force to provide the greatest possible chance of intercepting the French ships before they could escape. Wallace, in Experiment, took with him the frigate HMS Pallas and post ship HMS Unicorn, the brig HMS Cabot, the sloop HMS Fortune, and one other vessel donated by the locals to assist in the hunt. Gidoin, in Richmond, took with him the four other ships of the squadron and three more local armed vessels.

The two forces sailed on 12 May; Gidoin went directly for Coutances where the French were still at anchor, while Wallace took a westerly route around Jersey in order to cut off any escape route the French might have used. When Gidoin's force came in sight of the French, they set sail north for St Malo, towards where Wallace was waiting for them. Gidoin chased the French but by 10 p.m. the tide was against him and his ships were making very little headway so he was forced to anchor off Granville. At the same time Wallace's force were beset by similar difficulties but by 7 p.m. had succeeded in getting round Jersey. At 3 a.m. on 13 May Gidoin set sail once more and at a slow pace struggled in the direction the French had been sailing; at 10 a.m. he discovered Wallace's squadron ahead of him, chasing the French who had anchored at Cancale Bay. Gidoin was not able to make up the distance to Wallace and the French force, and would play no role in the subsequent action.

== Battle ==
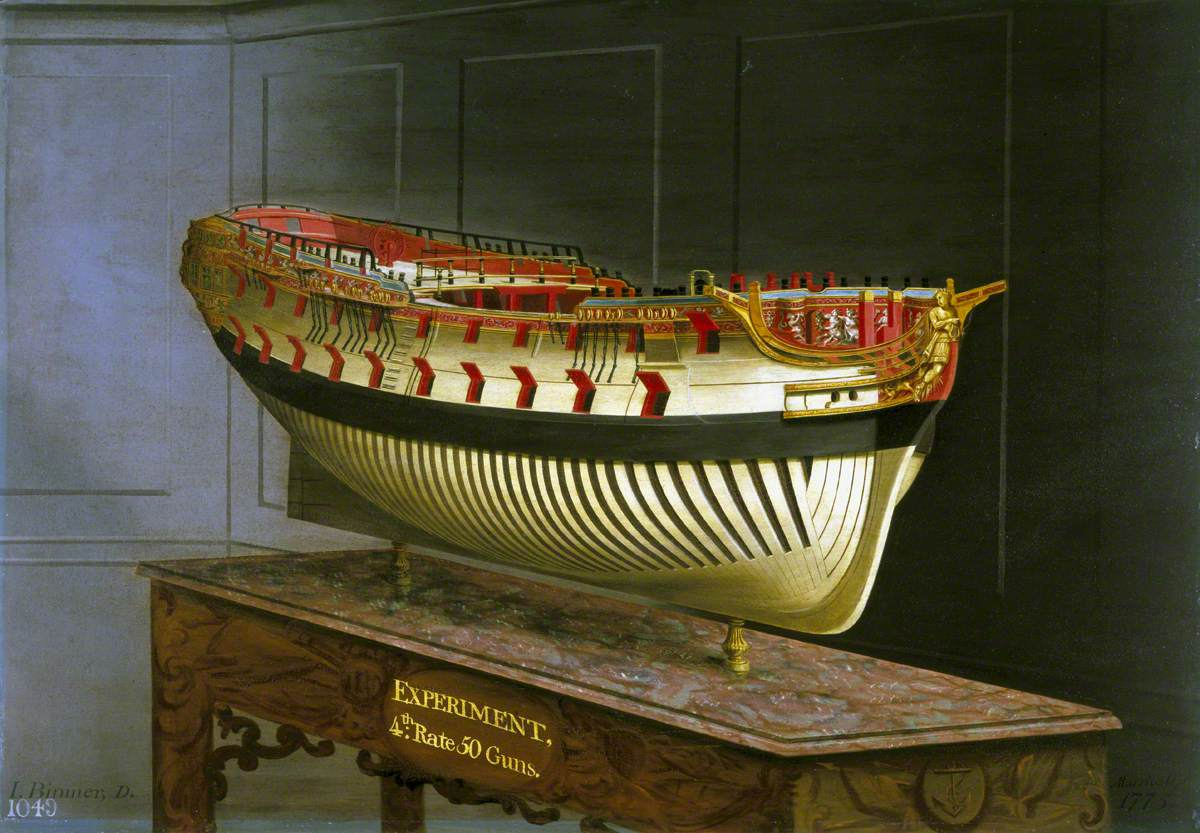
A painting of the lead British ship in the attack, Experiment

In the early morning daylight of 13 May Wallace, still sailing for the French, found another French frigate sailing from St Malo to assist her brethren in Cancale Bay. Wallace chased this new opponent under the guns of the batteries of St Malo, where she stayed. Unable to continue his assault on the frigate, Wallace redirected his force towards the original group of French ships, which were off to his left, just outside the bay itself. The French sailed into the bay in an attempt to escape the attack but Wallace, leading the chase in Experiment, followed them in. Diane escaped past Experiment back out of the bay, while the rest of the French squadron sailed towards the protection of a gun battery further in.

Danae had ten men killed and 20 wounded before her crew ran her aground and abandoned her in the bay, without her commander, Ship-of-the-line Lieutenant Raymond Marie de Kergariou, Chevalier de Coatles, having given any such order. When the crews of the other French vessels saw Danae's crew abandon her, they too abandoned their vessels. The French did not set fire to Danae as they were unable to extract her sick and wounded. The rest of Wallace's squadron having caught up with him, the British opened fire on the beached vessels for an hour and a half, forcing the French crews to escape to safety further inland. While the French squadron now lay defenceless, Wallace's attack had caused the local French militia to mobilise. The militia brought a number of cannon and howitzers to the bay and began to fire at the British ships.

Being now in the dangerous position of being fired on in an enclosed bay, Wallace was not able to bring all the French vessels off the shore as prizes. Instead he ordered that two of the ships be burned where they lay, and for the cutter Dieppe, also in the bay, to be scuttled. (Note: Alternatively reported that Dieppe was burned.) Danae was successfully brought off and captured alongside two merchantmen, a brig and the sloop Fleur. Valeur, Ecluse, and Guepe were among the ships set on fire. While Wallace's orders were being enacted on the stranded French warships, a battery of six 12-pounders had been erected and manned by the crews of the deserted ships. The battery began a concerted fire on Experiment that so frustrated Wallace that after Danae had been secured, he took control of the frigate from her pilots. He sailed her up the bay to lay up against the battery, which after forty-five minutes he destroyed and forced the crews to leave. (Note: Other reports state that the battery had already been destroyed before the French ships grounded themselves.) The British then sailed from the bay with their prizes, which were sent to England. For the British, casualties and losses in the action were minor. Experiment had been heavily damaged in the hull and sails by the batteries engaging her, and lost two men killed and thirteen wounded. Apart from this the only casualties came from Cabot, which had suffered three men wounded, including her purser who had his leg shot off.

== Aftermath ==
Pallas brought Danae into Plymouth on 17 May. The Royal Navy brought her into service under the same name. In reward for the success of the endeavour Commander Charles Powell Hamilton of Fortune and Commander Edmund Dod of Cabot were promoted to post-captain, and Lieutenant John Wallace of Experiment was promoted to commander. Experiment would go on to re-join Arbuthnot's force, which was still at Torbay, and sail to New York.

While several of the vessels burned by the British were unsalvageable, the French did succeed in rescuing Guepe after Wallace had left the bay, and later recovered Ecluse. Diane escaped. (Note: Guepe was wrecked in February 1781 at Cape Charles, Virginia. Ecluse returned to service and then became a merchantman after the end of the war. She was condemned in 1788. Diane continued in French service before being lost in a storm in 1780.) The destruction of their ships forced the French to abandon their plans to capture Jersey for use as a privateering and observation base, as they no longer had enough escorts available to protect an invasion force. The French tried again in 1781, but British forces on the island repelled the invasion at the Battle of Jersey.

== Order of Battle ==
British squadron
Ship	Guns	Commander	Casualties	Refs
Experiment	50	Captain Sir James Wallace	2 killed, 13 wounded	
Pallas	36	Captain Thomas Spry	—N/a	
Unicorn	20	Captain John Ford	—N/a	
Cabot	12/14	Commander Edmund Dod	3 wounded	
Fortune	12/14	Commander Charles Powell Hamilton	—N/a	
Armed lugger	Unknown		—N/a	

French squadron
Ship	Guns	Commander	Fate	Refs
Danae	34	Lieutenant Raymond de Kergariou de Coatles	Captured	
Diane	26		Escaped	
Dieppe	16		Scuttled	
Écluse (Note: Mis-named Recluse by Wallace.)	8		Burned but recovered	
Valeur	14		Burned	
Guepe	6 or 10		Burned but recovered	
