= List of shipwrecks in October 1831 =

The list of shipwrecks in October 1831 includes ships sunk, foundered, grounded, or otherwise lost during October 1831.

== 1 October ==
List of shipwrecks: 1 October 1831
Ship	State	Description
Brunswick	United Kingdom	The ship was in collision with Brunswick (United Kingdom) and foundered in the North Sea off Lowestoft, Suffolk. Her crew were rescued. She was on a voyage from Hamburg to London.
Meddlenot	United States	The ship was wrecked in the Abaco Islands. Her crew were rescued. She was on a voyage from New York to Havana, Cuba.
Sarah	United Kingdom	The ship was driven ashore in the Outer Hebrides. Her crew were rescued. She was on a voyage from Arkhangelsk, Russia, to Greenock, Renfrewshire.

== 2 October ==
List of shipwrecks: 2 October 1831
Ship	State	Description
Pilgrim	United Kingdom	The ship was wrecked on Cape Gaspé, Lower Canada, British North America.

== 3 October ==
List of shipwrecks: 3 October 1831
Ship	State	Description
Countess of Dalhousie	United Kingdom	The ship was wrecked on the south coast of Götaland, Sweden. She was on a voyage from Saint Petersburg, Russia, to London.
London	United States	The ship was wrecked on North Ronaldsay, Orkney Islands, United Kingdom. Her crew were rescued. She was on a voyage from Gothenburg, Sweden, to Boston, Massachusetts.
Mantura	United Kingdom	The ship foundered in the Baltic Sea off Götaland, Sweden. Her crew were rescued. She was on a voyage from Saint Petersburg to London.
Wellington	United Kingdom	The ship was lost in Dublin Bay.

== 4 October ==
List of shipwrecks: 4 October 1831
Ship	State	Description
Acasta	United Kingdom	The ship foundered off Uist, Outer Hebrides. Her crew were rescued. She was on a voyage from Arkhangelsk, Russia, to Plymouth, Devon.
Hope	United Kingdom	The ship departed from Drogheda, County Louth, for Liverpool, Lancashire. No further trace, presumed foundered in the Irish Sea with the loss of all hands.
Union	United Kingdom	The sloop was driven ashore near Ramsey, Isle of Man. She was on a voyage from Sligo to Liverpool.

== 6 October ==
List of shipwrecks: 6 October 1831
Ship	State	Description
Commerce	(United Kingdom of Great Britain and Ireland) British North America	The ship was wrecked in the Saint Lawrence River and Point Mille Vaches, Lower Canada. She was on a voyage from Saint Vincent to Quebec City, Lower Canada.
Countess of Dalhousie	United Kingdom	The ship was driven ashore and wrecked on Götaland, Sweden. She was on a voyage from Saint Petersburg, Russia, to London.
Field Marshal Paskewitsch	Russia	The ship was lost in the Mediterranean Sea off Methoni, Greece She was on a voyage from Odesa to London.
Mary and Peggy	United Kingdom	The sloop was driven ashore and wrecked at Douglas, Isle of Man. Her crew were rescued. She was on a voyage from Wexford to Liverpool, Lancashire.
Rose	United Kingdom	The sloop was wrecked in Luce Bay. She was on a voyage from Drogheda, County Louth, to Liverpool.

== 7 October ==
List of shipwrecks: 7 October 1831
Ship	State	Description
Huntcliff	United Kingdom	The ship was driven ashore at "Zerkshall". She was on a voyage from Hamburg to Liverpool, Lancashire.

== 8 October ==
List of shipwrecks: 8 October 1831
Ship	State	Description
Adeona	United Kingdom	The ship was wrecked near Seskar in the Gulf of Finland whilst bound for Saint Petersburg, Russia.
Fershampenuaz (Фершампенуаз, 'Fère-Champenoise')	Imperial Russian Navy	The Tryokh Svyatiteley-class ship of the line was destroyed by fire at Kronstadt with the loss of 49 of her crew.

== 9 October ==
List of shipwrecks: 9 October 1831
Ship	State	Description
Charles Elizabeth	United Kingdom	The ship was destroyed by fire at Starcross, Devon.
Mermaid	United Kingdom	The ship was destroyed by fire at Salt Key, Florida, United States.

== 10 October ==
List of shipwrecks: 10 October 1831
Ship	State	Description
Chance	(United Kingdom of Great Britain and Ireland) Jamaica	The brig was wrecked in the Atlantic Ocean and was abandoned by her crew.
Napoleon	United Kingdom	The ship was driven ashore on Anegada, Virgin Islands, and was abandoned by her crew. She was on a voyage from Gibraltar to New York, United States.
Theodosius	United Kingdom	The ship sank on the Cross Sand, in the North Sea off the coast of Suffolk. Her crew were rescued. She was on a voyage from Newcastle upon Tyne, Northumberland, to London.
Three Friends	United Kingdom	The ship was wrecked on the Gunfleet Sand, in the North Sea off the coast of Essex. Her crew were rescued. She was on a voyage from Wells-next-the-Sea, Norfolk, to London.

== 11 October ==
List of shipwrecks: 11 October 1831
Ship	State	Description
Hannah	United Kingdom	The ship was wrecked near Miramichi, New Brunswick, British North America. She was on a voyage from New Ross, County Wexford, to Miramichi.
Mary Macdonald	United Kingdom	The ship was driven ashore at Randers, Denmark. Her crew were rescued. She was on a voyage from Saint Petersburg, Russia, to London. She floated off on 16 October and was anchored off Randers.
Thistle	United Kingdom	The sloop was driven ashore and wrecked at Portknockie, Morayshire. Her crew survived.

== 12 October ==
List of shipwrecks: 12 October 1831
Ship	State	Description
Bell	United Kingdom	The ship was driven ashore at Liverpool, Nova Scotia, British North America.
Ceres	Grand Duchy of Oldenburg	The ship was capsized and sank in the English Channel off Cherbourg, Seine-Inférieure, France with the loss of a crew member. She was on a voyage from Oldenburg to Liverpool, Lancashire, United Kingdom.
Invizca	United States	The ship departed from Málaga, Spain, for Boston, Massachusetts. No further trace, presumed foundered with the loss of all hands.
Xantho	(United Kingdom of Great Britain and Ireland) Guernsey	The ship sprang a leak and was abandoned in the North Sea 40 nautical miles (74 km) off Flamborough Head, Yorkshire. Her crew were rescued by Twee Gebroeders (Netherlands). Xantho was on a voyage from Guernsey to South Shields, County Durham.

== 13 October ==
List of shipwrecks: 13 October 1831
Ship	State	Description
Vrouw Antina	Netherlands	The ship sprang a leak and put in to Heligoland, where she was deemed beyond economical repair. She was on a voyage from Wismar to Amsterdam, North Holland. Vrouw Antina was beached on 18 October to salvage her cargo.

== 14 October ==
List of shipwrecks: 14 October 1831
Ship	State	Description
Dawn	United Kingdom	The ship was abandoned in the North Sea off the Lemon sand. She was on a voyage from Riga, Russia, to London.
Luistania	United Kingdom	The ship was driven ashore and wrecked near Kinsale, County Cork. All on board were rescued. She was in a voyage from Liverpool, Lancashire, to Porto, Portugal.

== 15 October ==
List of shipwrecks: 15 October 1831
Ship	State	Description
Enige Broder	flag unknown	The ship departed from Copenhagen, Denmark, for Saint Petersburg, Russia. No further trace, presumed foundered with the loss of all hands.

== 16 October ==
List of shipwrecks: 16 October 1831
Ship	State	Description
Charles	United Kingdom	The ship was wrecked near Burghead, Morayshire. She was on a voyage from Bangor to Whitehaven, Cumberland.
Mary	United Kingdom	The ship was holed by an anchor and was consequently beached at South Shields, County Durham.
Stad Rotterdam	Netherlands	The ship was driven ashore near Hellevoetsluis, Zeeland.

== 17 October ==
List of shipwrecks: 17 October 1831
Ship	State	Description
Effort	United Kingdom	The ship was wrecked on "Dorgey Island". Her crew were rescued. She was on a voyage from Cork to Limerick.
Emerald	United Kingdom	The ship was driven ashore and capsized at Pillau, Prussia, with the loss of a crew member.
Themis	United Kingdom	The ship was wrecked near Scatarie Island, Nova Scotia, British North America. She was on a voyage from Newcastle upon Tyne, Northumberland, to Miramichi, New Brunswick, British North America.

== 18 October ==
List of shipwrecks: 18 October 1831
Ship	State	Description
James	United States	The ship departed from Málaga, Spain, for Boston, Massachusetts. No further trace, presumed foundered with the loss of all hands.

== 19 October ==
List of shipwrecks: 19 October 1831
Ship	State	Description
Alfred	United Kingdom	The ship was abandoned in the Baltic Sea. Her crew were rescued by Mary (United Kingdom). Alfred was on a voyage from Riga, Russia, to London.
Catherine	United Kingdom	The ship was driven ashore and wrecked in Catalan Bay, Gibraltar, with the loss of three of her eight crew. She was on a voyage from Çeşme, Ottoman Empire ro London.

== 20 October ==
List of shipwrecks: 20 October 1831
Ship	State	Description
Ajax	United Kingdom	The ship was wrecked in the Magdalen Islands, Lower Canada, British North America. She was on a voyage from Quebec City, Lower Canada, to Cork.

== 21 October ==
List of shipwrecks: 21 October 1831
Ship	State	Description
Carl Ludwig	(Russian Empire) Grand Duchy of Finland	The ship ran aground on the Bear Rock, in the Baltic Sea 8 nautical miles (15 km) off Öregrund, Sweden, where she was wrecked two days later. All on board were rescued. She was on a voyage from Helsingfors to Rio de Janeiro, Brazil.
Cleopatra	United Kingdom	The ship was driven ashore at Dublin. She was refloated on 23 October.
Commerce	United Kingdom	The ship was wrecked on a reef at Youghal, County Cork.
Nostra Señhora del Gracia	Spain	The ship was wrecked on Anegada, Virgin Islands.

== 22 October ==
List of shipwrecks: 22 October 1831
Ship	State	Description
Neptunus	Denmark	The ship was wreckedon the Goodwin Sands, Kent, United Kingdom. Her crew were rescued. She was on a voyage from Copenhagen to Nantes, Loire-Inférieure, France.
Valiant	United Kingdom	The ship was wrecked on Stag Rock, off Penzance, Cornwall. She was on a voyage from Richibucto, New Brunswick, British North America, to Hull, Yorkshire.
Wakefield	United Kingdom	The ship was driven ashore and wrecked at Holyhead, Anglesey. She was on a voyage from Liverpool, Lancashire, to Brazil.

== 23 October ==
List of shipwrecks: 23 October 1831
Ship	State	Description
Leonidas	Spain	The ship foundered in the Atlantic Ocean. Her crew were rescued by William Pitt (United Kingdom). She was on a voyage from St. Ubes to Portland, Maine, United States.
Raven	United Kingdom	The ship was driven ashore at Lytham St. Annes, Lancashire. She was on a voyage from Newry, County Armagh, to Liverpool, Lancashire.
Vigilant	United Kingdom	The brig was wrecked on Lizard Point, Cornwall. Her crew were rescued.

== 24 October ==
List of shipwrecks: 24 October 1831
Ship	State	Description
Champion	United Kingdom	The ship was wrecked on Hogland, Russia, at the end of October. Her crew were rescued. She was on a voyage from Saint Petersburg, Russia, to London.
Diana	United Kingdom	The ship was wrecked at "Marshand". She was on a voyage from Liverpool, Lancashire, to Helsingfors, Grand Duchy of Finland.
George Canning	United Kingdom	The ship was driven ashore on North Cape, Prince Edward Islands, British North America.
Red Rover	United Kingdom	The yacht was wrecked at Rio Real, Brazil, whilst on a voyage from an English port to Buenos Aires, Argentina.

== 25 October ==
List of shipwrecks: 25 October 1831
Ship	State	Description
Columbus	United Kingdom	The ship foundered in Swansea Bay. She was on a voyage from Cardiff, Glamorgan, to Blyth, Northumberland.
Junius	United Kingdom	The ship was wrecked on Islay. She was on a voyage from Liverpool, Lancashire, to Newfoundland, British North America.
Lady Digby	United Kingdom	The barque was wrecked on the Magdalen Islands, Lower Canada, British North America, with the loss of 50 lives. She was on a voyage from Liverpool to Quebec City, Lower Canada.
Liberty	United Kingdom	The ship was driven ashore and wrecked north of Tynemouth, Northumberland. Her crew were rescued.
Wellington	United Kingdom	The ship foundered in the North Sea. Her crew were rescued. She was on a voyage from Stockton on Tees, County Durham, to London.

== 26 October ==
List of shipwrecks: 26 October 1831
Ship	State	Description
Commerce	United Kingdom	The ship foundered in the North Sea off Corton, Suffolk. She was on a voyage from Sunderland, County Durham, to Chatham, Kent.

== 27 October ==
List of shipwrecks: 27 October 1831
Ship	State	Description
Devonshire	United Kingdom	The ship passed through the Skaggerak whilst on a voyage from Riga, Russia, to Antwerp, Belgium. No further trace, presumed foundered in the North Sea with the loss of all hands.

== 28 October ==
List of shipwrecks: 28 October 1831
Ship	State	Description
Neptune	United Kingdom	The ship was abandoned in the Atlantic Ocean. Her crew were rescued by William and Mary (United Kingdom).

== 29 October ==
List of shipwrecks: 29 October 1831
Ship	State	Description
Caroline	Hamburg	The ship was driven ashore at Thisted, Denmark, where she was burned by order of local officials. She was om a voyage from AAltona to Thisted.

== 30 October ==
List of shipwrecks: 30 October 1831
Ship	State	Description
Minerva	United Kingdom	The ship was driven ashore at "Pilkappen", 36 nautical miles (67 km) south of Memel, Prussia. Her crew were rescued.

== 31 October ==
List of shipwrecks: 31 October 1831
Ship	State	Description
Europe	United Kingdom	The ship was driven ashore and wrecked at Karlskrona, Sweden. Her crew were rescued. She was on a voyage from London to Vyborg, Grand Duchy of Finland.

== Unknown date ==
List of shipwrecks: Unknown date 1831
Ship	State	Description
Alexandrine	Spain	The ship was driven ashore near San Pedro del Pinatar.
Echo	United Kingdom	The steamship was wrecked at Plymouth, Devon.
Louisa	France	The ship sank in the Loire.
Lusitania	United Kingdom	The ship was driven ashore at Ardmore, County Waterford, where she broke up on 22 October.
Manly	United Kingdom	The ship was wrecked on Korčula, Kingdom of Dalmatia before 14 October. Her crew were rescued.
Margaret	United States	The ship was driven ashore on Europa Point, Gibraltar, before 8 October. She was on a voyage from Marseille, Bouches-du-Rhône, France, to Philadelphia, Pennsylvania.
Maria	United Kingdom	The brig was wrecked on the Gunfleet Sand, in the North Sea off the coast of Essex before 15 October. She was on a voyage from Newcastle upon Tyne to Sheerness. Kent.
Mary	United Kingdom	The ship was wrecked on the coast of Jutland. Her crew were rescued. She was on a voyage from Saint Petersburg to London.
Three Friends	United Kingdom	The brig was wrecked on the Gunfleet Sand before 15 October. Her crew survived. She was on a voyage from Wells-next-the-Sea, Norfolk, to London.
Triumvirate	United Kingdom	The ship was abandoned in the Atlantic Ocean.
Try Me	(United Kingdom of Great Britain and Ireland) British North America	The ship was wrecked on Burin, Newfoundland. Her crew were rescued.
