= HMS Rose (1757) =

Seaford-class Royal Navy vessel

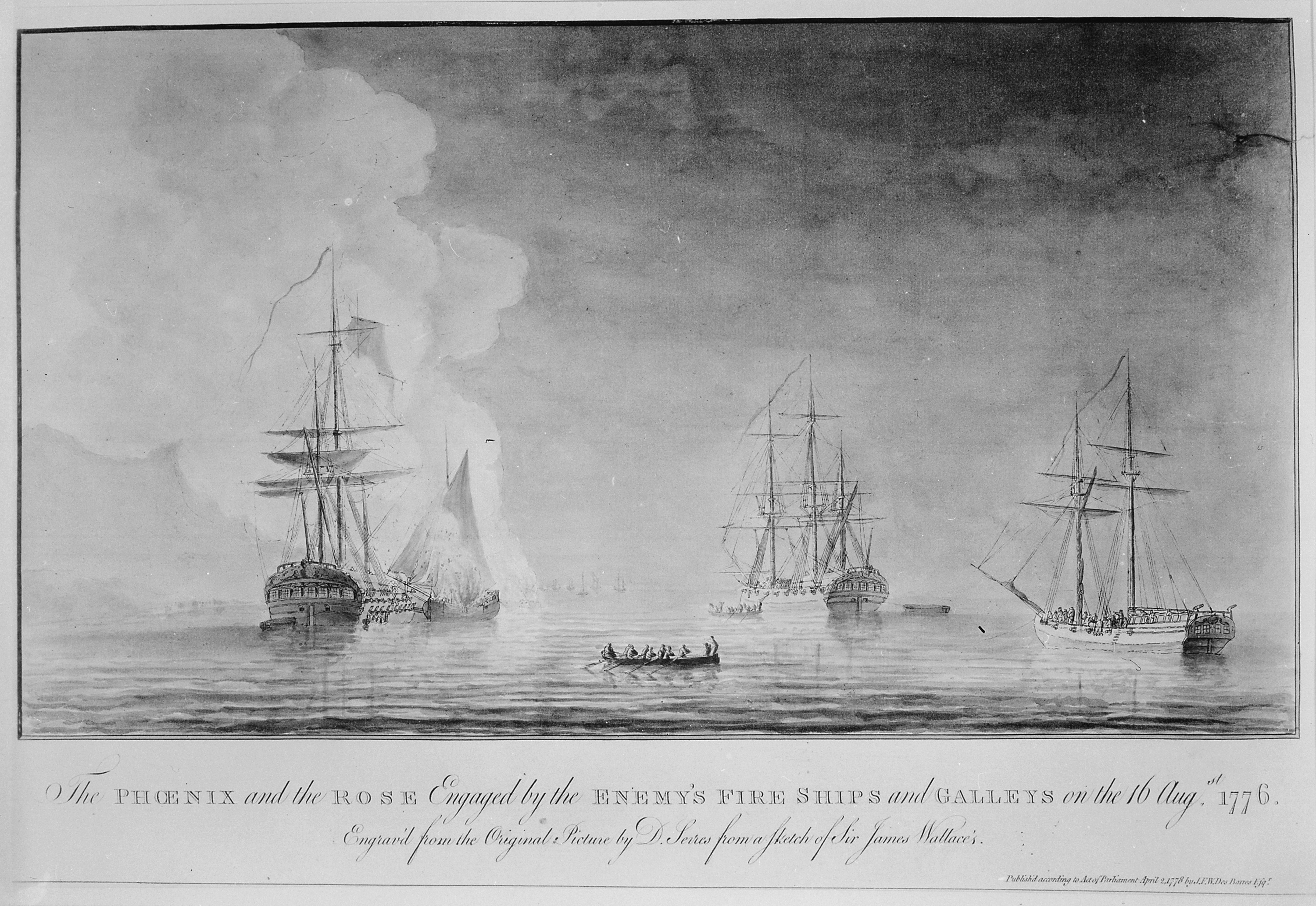
- The Phoenix and the Rose engaged by the enemy's fire ships and galleys on 16 August 1776. Engraving by Dominic Serres after a sketch by Sir James Wallace

History

Great Britain
- Name: HMS Rose
- Ordered: 13 April 1756
- Builder: Hugh Blaydes, Hull, England
- Laid down: 5 June 1756
- Launched: 8 March 1757
- Fate: Scuttled as blockship on 19 September 1779 in Savannah, Georgia.

General characteristics
- Class & type: 20-gun Seaford-class sixth-rate post ship
- Tons burthen: 44952/94 bm
- Length: 108 ft 11.5 in (33.2 m) (gundeck); 90 ft 10.25 in (27.7 m) (keel)
- Beam: 30 ft 6 in (9.3 m)
- Draught: 9 ft 7 in (2.9 m)
- Sail plan: Full-rigged ship
- Complement: 160
- Armament: 20 × 9-pounder guns

HMS Rose was a 20-gun Seaford-class post ship of the Royal Navy, built at Blaydes Yard in Hull, England in 1757 and in service until 1779. Her activities in suppressing smuggling in the colony of Rhode Island provoked the formation of what became the Continental Navy, precursor of the modern United States Navy. She was based at the North American station in the West Indies and then used in the American Revolutionary War. A replica was built in 1970, then modified to match HMS Surprise, and used in two films, Master and Commander: Far Side of the World and Pirates of the Caribbean: On Stranger Tides.

== Activities in North America ==
HMS Rose was built in Hull, England in 1757, as a 20 gun sixth-rate post ship for the British Royal Navy. In the Seven Years' War, Rose was in service in the Channel and in the Caribbean. She was briefly considered for service as Captain James Cook's vessel on his first exploration of the Pacific, but was rejected as unable to stow the quantity of provisions required for the planned circumnavigation of the globe. Instead she was sent to the North American station, en route to which she encountered Cook's ultimate choice of vessel, HMS Endeavour, on 12 September 1768 when the two ships anchored alongside each other at Funchal in the Madeira Islands.

In 1774, Rose, under the command of Sir James Wallace, was sent to Narragansett Bay in Rhode Island to put an end to the rampant smuggling that had made Newport the fourth wealthiest city in America. Since Rose was much larger than any American vessel of the time and Wallace was an effective commander, smuggling activity quickly came to a halt. On 22 February 1775 she captured sloop Lively carrying contraband goods. On morning of 2 April 1775 she ran aground on the north end of Goat Island, getting off that evening. On 26 April 1775 she seized the sloops Diana and Abigail. On 2 May 1775, she seized a sloop owned by one of the Providence Paquet clan. On 30 August 1775, Wallace attacked Stonington Connecticut, possibly the first British incursion of the conflict. The presence of Rose threatened to derail the economy of Newport. Local merchants soon petitioned their colonial legislature to establish a navy and chase off Wallace and his crew. They backed up their petitions by putting up funds to have a merchant vessel converted for military use. This vessel was commissioned as the sloop-of-war Providence, which became the first naval command of John Paul Jones. Rhode Island declared its independence from Britain on 4 May 1776, two full months before the rest of the colonies. The petitioning of the Continental Congress to form a naval force to rid Narragansett Bay of Rose was the impetus for the creation of the Continental Navy.

In July 1776, during the American Revolutionary War, Rose took part in the British invasion of New York, firing on fortifications and making forays far up the Hudson River along with HMS Phoenix. Wallace was knighted for his actions in helping to force the army of George Washington out of the state and put it firmly under British control. She also patrolled the rest of the northeast coast of America, suppressing efforts by American ships to engage in trade and pressing their sailors into Royal Navy service, and providing logistical support for the British garrison in Boston.

Among her last recorded actions, occurring on 27 January 1779, was the capture of a prize in Chesapeake Bay.

== Scuttled in Savannah, Georgia ==
Rose finally met her end in 1779 in Savannah, Georgia, no longer seaworthy and unfit for service. The British scuttled Rose in a narrow part of the channel, effectively blocking it. Consequently, both French and American naval forces could not reach the city and Savannah remained in British hands until the war's end. After the war Rose was destroyed to clear the channel. Though only a few artefacts have been recovered by dredging over the years, the United States Army Corps of Engineers recovered three cannons and an anchor from the Savannah River, believed to be from HMS Rose.

== HMS Rose replica ==
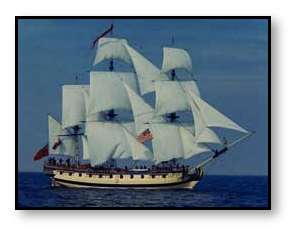
Replica HMS Rose off Massachusetts in 1971, the hull painted as her namesake

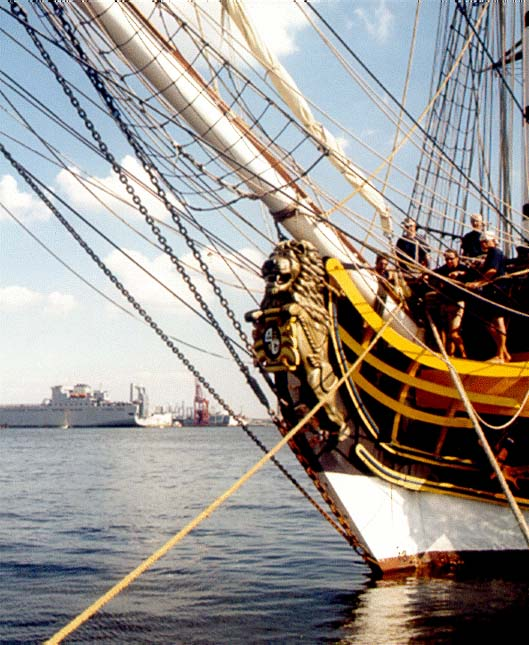
Replica HMS Rose figurehead in 2000

In 1970 a replica of HMS Rose was built in Lunenburg, Nova Scotia. She was also named HMS Rose and initially intended as a "dockside attraction," used for display and later sail training. In 1991 the ship gained the United States Coast Guard certification as a sail training vessel. She took part in many maritime events, among them in the huge Tall Ship Race "Columbus 500" in 1992. In 2001, she was purchased by Fox Studios, sailed to Southern California, and altered to resemble HMS Surprise for the Peter Weir movie Master and Commander: The Far Side of the World, based on the books by Patrick O'Brian. Renamed Surprise, the vessel is now a part of the Maritime Museum of San Diego as a dockside attraction.
