= Vulture (1779 ship) =

French privateer and slave ship

History

Great Britain
- Name: Vulture
- Namesake: Vulture
- Launched: France
- Acquired: 1779
- Captured: 1795

General characteristics
- Tons burthen: 300, or 315 (bm)
- Length: 117 ft 0 in (35.7 m)
- Beam: 26 ft 3 in (8.0 m)
- Complement: 120 (1793)
- Armament: 1779: 18 × 6-pounder guns; 1783: 6 × 6-pounder guns; 1793: 30 × 6&9&12
- Notes: Two decks & three masts

Vulture was built in France 1777, and captured. By early 1779, she was sailing as a privateer out of Liverpool. She then became a slave ship in the triangular trade in enslaved people. She made 10 voyages transporting enslaved people and was captured in 1795, on her 11th such voyage.

== Career ==
Vulture was captured in 1778, from the French, condemned in the High Court of Admiralty on 2 December 1778, and made free at Liverpool on 15 January 1779. She first appeared in Lloyd's Register (LR) in 1779 with Allanson, master, William Boats, owner, and trade Liverpool privateer. On 27 April 1779, Vulture, Allanson, master, captured St Cyprian, of 400 tons (bm), which was sailing from Martinique to Bordeaux. Then in August Vulture captured the Spanish snow San Esteven, which was sailing from Orinoco to Cadiz. San Esteven was carrying 1400 rolls of the "Genuine and Fine Oronoque Vorcena or Cannastre Tobacco, 23 tons of cocoa, 400 hides, 370 dollars, and some chest of medicine."

On 31 January 1783, Vulture, Captain Allanson, came into Kinsale. A storm had carried away her main and mizzen masts. On 14 February, she sailed for Liverpool to effect repairs and on the 14th she put into Liverpool, having sustained "some Damage."

1st voyage transporting enslaved people (1781–1782): Captain John Savage sailed from Liverpool on 1 June 1781. Vulture gathered her captives at Bonny and arrived at Kingston, Jamaica, on 1 December, with 525 captives. She left on 14 February 1782, and arrived back at Liverpool on 4 April. She had left with 50 crew members and suffered eight crew deaths on the voyage. Vulture had sailed home in company with Jane, Hewan, master. On their way they captured two Spanish vessels sailing from Havana to Omoa. One vessel, a snow with 3100 dollars, sail cloth, etc., the British sent for Liverpool. The second was a gunboat that her captors turned over to their prisoners. The snow foundered off the coast of Ireland.

Year	Master	Owner	Trade	Source & notes
1783	W.Wilson	W.Boats	Liverpool–St Lucia; Liverpool–Africa	LR; raised 1781, lengthened and thorough repair 1782

Vulture made a trading voyage to St Lucia and Tortola between 7 November 1782, and 3 July 1783. She brought back sugar, fustic, coffee, cotton, and rum.

2nd voyage transporting enslaved people (1783–1784): Captain William Wilson sailed from Liverpool on 26 July 1783, bound for Bonny. Vulture arrived at Kingston on 4 March 1784, with 592 captives. She left on 7 April, and arrived back at Liverpool on 25 May. She had left Liverpool with 53 crew members and suffered 19 crew deaths on her voyage.

3rd voyage transporting enslaved people (1784–1785): Captain Wilson sailed from Liverpool on 9 July 1784. She gathered her captives at Bonny and delivered 698 to Kingston on 11 December 1784. She sailed from Kingston on 5 March 1785, and arrived back at Liverpool on 20 April. She had left Liverpool with 50 crew members and suffered 13 crew deaths on the voyage.

4th voyage transporting enslaved people (1785–1786): Captain James Brown sailed from Liverpool on 25 June 1785. Vulture gathered her captives at Bonny and delivered 570 to Dominica. She arrived back at Liverpool on 15 April 1786. She had left Liverpool with 44 crew members and suffered five crew deaths on the voyage.

5th voyage transporting enslaved people (1786–1787): Captain Brown sailed from Liverpool on 5 June 1786. Vulture gathered captives first and Bonny and then at New Calabar. She sailed to Kingston, stopping first at São Tomé. She arrived at Kingston on 27 January 1787. She arrived with 646 captives, and landed 589. She sailed for Liverpool on 3 April and arrived home on 5 June. She had left with 49 crewmembers and suffered 16 crew deaths on her voyage.

It was on this voyage, on 16 September 1786, that a seaman died of his injuries after having been "barbarously beaten". Although he did not name Vulture or Brown by name, the abolitionist Thomas Clarkson mentioned the instance in his history of the abolition of the trade. (Note: Clarkson wanted to have a charge of murder brought against Brown, but Clarkson's friends dissuaded him, arguing that he would be unsuccessful and that doing so would work against the abolitionist cause.)

6th voyage transporting enslaved people (1788–1789): Captain Brown sailed from Liverpool on 12 May 1788. Vulture gathered captives at Bonny and delivered 602 captives to Montego Bay on 31 December 1788.

The origin of captives made a difference in the price the enslavers could achieve. The "600 Eboe slaves" that she brought sold in January 1789, for an average price of £40 9s 5d each. The captives that George sold that same month came from Anamaboe and commanded an average price of over £45.

Vulture arrived back at Liverpool on 18 May 1789. She had left Liverpool with 52 crewmembers and she had suffered six crew deaths on the voyage.

The passage in 1788, of Dolben's Act (Slave Trade Act 1788) reduced the number of captives that Vulture would gather on subsequent voyages. (Note: The Act held that ships could transport without penalty 1.67 captives per ton up to a maximum of 207 tons (bm); after which they were allowed to carry only 1 captive per ton. That Act limited the number of captives that Vulture was allowed to load to 439 (@ 300 tons burthen). From 1791 on, LR showed her burthen at 360 tons, which would have permitted her to carry up to 499 captives.)

7th voyage transporting enslaved people (1789–1790): Captain Brown sailed from Liverpool on 12 June 1789. Vulture again gathered her captives at Bonny and delivered them to Montego Bay. She had embarked 448 captives and she delivered 444 on 1 December. She arrived back at Liverpool on 20 May 1790. She had left Liverpool with 43 crew members and she suffered no crew deaths on her voyage.

Year	Master	Owner	Trade	Source & notes
1791	S.Clough	W.Boats	Liverpool–Africa	LR; raised 1781, lengthened and thorough repair 1782, & repairs 1790

8th voyage transporting enslaved people (1790–1791): Captain Samuel Clough sailed from Liverpool on 16 October 1790. Vulture gathered her captives at Bonny and delivered them to Montego Bay. She arrived on 15 May 1791, and landed 436. There apparently there was an insurrection aboard her by her captives, either before or during the voyage, but details are lacking.

Vulture arrived back at Liverpool on 1 August. She had left with 50 crew members and suffered seven crew deaths on her voyage.

9th voyage transporting enslaved people (1791–1792): Captain Clough sailed from Liverpool on 10 September 1791, and began trading in Africa on 27 November. Vulture gathered her captives at Bonny. She left Africa on 5 March 1792, and arrived at Montego Bay on 10 May. She landed 444 captives, the same number as she had embarked. She arrived back at Liverpool on 16 July. She had left Liverpool with 39 crew members, and she suffered four crew deaths on her voyage.

After the passage of Dolben's Act, masters received a bonus of £100 for a mortality rate of under 2%; the ship's surgeon received £50. For a mortality rate between two and three per cent, the bonus was halved. There was no bonus if mortality exceeded 3%.

10th voyage transporting enslaved people (1792–1793): Captain James Bachope sailed from Liverpool on 6 October 1792. Vulture gathered her captives at Bonny and arrived at Kingston on 18 June 1793. There she landed 465 captives. She left on 21 August, and arrived back at Liverpool on 8 October. She had left Liverpool with 40 crew members and she suffered seven crew deaths on the voyage.

War with France began while Captain James Baychop was still in the middle of the voyage. Still he was issued or acquired a letter of marque on 11 April 1793. The size of the crew and the armament suggests that Vulture's owners acquired the letter of marque, as an option to engage in privateering when she returned.

Vulture may have sailed on a privateering cruise, but there is no record of such a voyage in Lloyd's List, or in British newspapers available online.

== Fate ==
Captain James Bachope sailed from Liverpool on 23 August 1794, on a voyage to acquire captives. Lloyd's List reported on 12 May 1795, that a French squadron had captured Vulture, Backop, master, Princess Royal, [James] Brown, master, and Eliza, [Samuel] Clough, master, in the Bonny River. The capture occurred between 22 and 29 December 1794. Vulture had not embarked any captives before the French captured her.

In 1794, 25 British ships in the triangular trade were lost. Three were lost on the African coast. During the period 1793 to 1807, war, rather than maritime hazards nor slave resistance, was the greatest cause of vessel losses among British slave vessels.
