= Triumvirate (ship) =

Several vessels have been named Triumvirate.

- Triumvirate (1773 ship), of 200 tons (bm), was launched at Newbury in 1773. Between 1778 and 1783, her master was Captain Richard Ledgard. Earlier he had been at Poole. From time to time the government hired Triumvirate as a naval transport. On 17 March 1779, Triumvirate, Richard Ledgard, master, and six other transports arrived in Cromarty under convoy of the armed ship Leith. At end–May 1779 Triumvirate and five other transports were at Spithead ready to receive 700 men, women, and baggage. A secondary source reports that "HMS Triumvirate" was lost at Honduras on 2 September 1787. There is no record of any HMS Triumvirate ever serving with the Royal Navy, and the original press report makes clear that Triumvirate, Brown, master, although present during the gale on 2 September, was not harmed and was intending to sail for London on 6 October. Triumvirate, Brown, master, was sunk at St George's Quay, Honduras in early 1789.
- Triumvirate (1803 ship), of 180 tons (bm), was launched in 1803 at Poole. In 1803, George Welch Ledgard, Thomas Chancy, and John Gosse formed a partnership to engage in the Newfoundland trade. Poole was a center for the Newfoundland trade. Newfoundland exported salt cod, salmon, seal skins, seal oil, and cod oil. Portugal and Spain were the primary markets for the salt cod (Bacalhau/Bacalao), and salmon; the rest was sold at Poole. (Note: For an explanation of the expulsion in the 16th century and subsequent absence of the Iberian fishing fleets from the Newfoundland cod fishery see the book Cod.) The privateer schooner Macedonia, of New Hampshire, captured Triumvirate on 6 February 1815. The crew arrived at Porto Santa on 16 February. Macedonian had captured Triumvirate as she was sailing from St. John's, Newfoundland to the Mediterranean with fish and oil. Her captors burnt Triumvirate. (Note: Macedonian, of Portsmouth, New Hampshire, and of 232 tons (bm), was a schooner armed with six guns and carrying a crew of 95 men.)
- Triumvirate (1816 ship), of 180 tons (bm), was launched in 1816 at Poole. She was listed as having been lost on three separate occasions. First, her crew was reported to have abandoned her in October 1831 at 44°N 56°W. Second, on 12 March 1838, she was driven ashore at Point La Haye, Newfoundland. She was sailing from Whitehaven, Cumberland to Carbonear, Newfoundland. Lastly, on 22 June 1847, Triumvirate was driven ashore on Saltholm, Denmark. She was on a voyage from Saint Petersburg, Russia to London. Throughout this period Triumvirate was a unique name in Lloyd's Register, always identifying the vessel as being of 180/181 tons (bm), built in Poole in 1816 (or 1818). The owner was identified as Fryer & Co., a firm linked to the owners of Triumvirate (1803 ship).
