= Joseph Jacques François de Martelly Chautard =

French Navy officer of the War of American Independence

Joseph Jacques François de Martelly Chautard (Note: Also written "Martelli".) (Toulon, 1734 — Ollioules 1810) was a French Navy officer. He served in the War of American Independence.

== Biography ==
Martelly-Chautard was born to the family of Victoire de Villeneuve des Arcs and of Louis-Antoine de Martelly de Chautard, an official of Toulon. He joined the Navy as a Garde-Marine on 6 July 1750. In 1755, he was promoted to Ensign.

In 1756, he was made an artillery sub-lieutenant, and rose to lieutenant in 1760.

He was promoted to Lieutenant de Vaisseau on 1 October 1764. In 1767, he commanded a company training gunners.

In 1770, he was given command of the bomb ship Etna. He took part in a raid against Tunis, where he earned the Order of Saint Louis, awarded to him in 1771. In 1773, he captained Éclair.

In 1774, Chautard married Albertine Thierry de Ville d'Avray.

In 1777, he was given command of the light frigate Pléïade for a mission to Algiers.

On 4 April 1777, Martelly-Chautard was promoted to Capitaine de Vaisseau. He was given command of the 50-gun Experiment and on 1 May 1780, he departed Marseille, escorting 33 merchantmen to Saint-Pierre de la Martinique. He arrived on 16 June and joined a squadron under Bouillé. He then took part in the Invasion of Tobago in June 1781. He then sailed North to join with a division stationed off James River and York River to secure communications channels between Grasse's squadron and Saint-Simon's expeditionary corps, along with Glorieux, Triton and Vaillant, and the frigates Andromaque and Diligente.

On 14 December 1781, Martelly-Chautard was promoted to the command of the 74-gun Palmier, and was made commanding officer of the station at Saint Domingue. He took part in the Battle of the Saintes on 12 April 1782.

Oh her return to France, Palmier was lost in a storm on 24 October 1782. Martelly Chautard was acquitted by the subsequent court-martial. On 16 August 1784, Martelly-Chautard was admitted in the Society of the Cincinnati.

In October 1784, he was promoted to Brigadier and retired.

At the French Revolution, Martelly-Chautard was made President of the Toulon district, keepin the position until 31 July 1792. He then went to Paris as an envoy to the National Legislative Assembly. He was also in the Garde nationale from 1 December 1792 to 10 May 1793.

On 25 June 1800, First Consul Napoléon Bonaparte appointed him Mayor of Toulon. From 1802 to 1806, he was General Council for Var.

== Sources and references ==
Notes

Citations

References

- Contenson, Ludovic (1934). La Société des Cincinnati de France et la guerre d'Amérique (1778-1783). Paris: éditions Auguste Picard. OCLC 7842336.
- Lacour-Gayet, Georges (1910). La marine militaire de la France sous le règne de Louis XVI. Paris: Honoré Champion.
- La Monneraye, Pierre-Bruno-Jean (1998). Souvenirs de 1760 à 1791. Librairie Droz. ISBN 9782745300799. OCLC 165892922.
- Troude, Onésime-Joachim (1867). Batailles navales de la France (in French). Vol. 2. Challamel ainé.
