= French ship Écluse (1764) =

French naval gabarre and slave ship 1764–1788

History

France
- Name: Écluse
- Builder: Jean-Joseph Ginoux, Le Havre
- Laid down: April 1764
- Launched: August 1764
- Fate: Condemned 1788

General characteristics
- Displacement: Unladen:400-450 (French tons); Laden: 700
- Length: Overall: 112 ft (34.1 m), or 118 ft (36.0 m), or 38.3 m (126 ft); Keel: 100 ft (30.5 m)
- Beam: 25 ft (7.6 m), or 8.1 m (27 ft)
- Depth of hold: 13 ft 3 in (4.0 m), or 4.3 m (14 ft)
- Complement: 31–86
- Armament: Design: 24 × 6-pounder + 8 × 32-pounder guns; Actual: 8–20 6-pounder guns

Écluse was a gabarre launched at le Havre in 1764 for the French Navy. The navy lent her out to private parties who made one voyage as a slave ship (1770–1771), in the triangular trade in enslaved persons. She then returned to naval service. In May 1779 she participated in the unsuccessful invasion of Jersey; a British naval squadron succeeded in capturing or destroying much of the French squadron, and burnt Écluse. She was recovered and returned to service. In 1782, after the end of the war, the navy lent her out to serve as a merchantman. She was decommissioned in 1788.

== Career ==
On 24 May 1765 she became a water carrier ("cucurbite" (Fr: flask)).

Slave voyage: In 1770 the French government lent Écluse to private parties for a slave-trading voyage. Captain David Eyriès sailed from Brest (or Rochefort) on 12 November 1770. She began acquiring slaves at Gorée on 20 December. She sailed from there on 24 May 1771 with 160 slaves, and then acquired more on the Gold Coast. She sailed from Africa on 1 June 1771 and arrived at Port-au-Prince with 188 slaves, 73 men, 65 women, 22 boys and 28 girls, on 13 July. She arrived back at Nantes on 14 October. She had left France with 48 men (some records say 75). Six men left at Gorée, but seven joined. She lost five men on her voyage: one man drowned on the way to Africa, three died while she was on the coast, one of whom was killed by locals while embarking slaves, and one at Saint-Domingue.

On 25 February 1779 she sailed from Brest to Rochefort with a cargo of cannons.

Invasion of Jersey: The gabarre Écluse, of eight guns, sailed from Saint-Malo as part of a small French squadron carrying troops to land at St Ouen's Bay on Jersey. They arrived off shore on 1 May. The British moved guns and troops and guns to oppose the landing. The French armed vessels were unable to get close enough to shore to provide supporting fire so the troop transports did not attempt to land their troops. The French sailed away. The French sailed from Saint-Malo on 13 May and immediately encountered a British naval relief squadron that belatedly come up. The British succeeded in chasing the French into Cancale Bay, where the British captured the French frigate Danae, and a brig and cutter. They also set fire to three French vessels, one of them Écluse.

The French later succeeded in recovering Écluse, and another of the burnt vessels. and returning them to service.

== Fate ==
In 1782, after the end of the war, the navy lent Écluse to merchants.

== Fate ==
Écluse was decommissioned at Rochfort in May 1788 and subsequently condemned.
