= Princess Royal (1790 ship) =

History

Great Britain
- Name: Princess Royal
- Owner: 1790: John Dawson; 1794:Richard Watt
- Builder: Liverpool
- Launched: 1790
- Fate: Captured December 1794

General characteristics
- Tons burthen: 405 (bm)
- Propulsion: Sail
- Complement: 70
- Armament: 20 × 9-pounder guns

Princess Royal was launched at Liverpool in 1790. She made four voyages as a slave ship in the triangular trade in enslaved people. The French captured her in 1794 at the beginning of her fifth enslaving voyage.

== Slaver ==
Princess Royal first appears in Lloyd's Register with William Forbes, master, John Dawson, owner, and trade Liverpool–Africa.

On all four slave trading voyages that Princess Royal completed, she gathered her captives in the Bight of Biafra and Gulf of Guinea islands. In 1791 she delivered them to Cuba. On the other voyages she took them to Jamaica.

1st enslaving voyage (1790): Dawson sailed from Liverpool on 29 April 1790. He gathered his captives at Bonny Island and delivered them to Kingston, Jamaica on 6 November with 528 captives. Also, four of his 46 crew members died on the voyage. Princess Royal sailed from Kingston on 22 December and arrived back at Liverpool on 14 February 1791.

2nd enslaving voyage (1791–1792): Robert Catterall replaced Forbes for the second slaving voyage. He sailed from Liverpool on 8 March 1791 and started slave trading on 6 June. Apparently he first gathered captives at "Barabalemo", and then at Bonny. Princess Royal sailed from Africa on 21 October and arrived at Havana on 30 December with 444 captives. She left Havana on 27 January 1792 and arrived back at Liverpool on 19 March. Princess Royal had left Liverpool with 39 crew members and four crew members died on the voyage.

3rd enslaving voyage (1792–1793): John Bunnell replaced Catterall, but John Carson in turn replaced Bunnell. Carson sailed from Liverpool on 26 April 1792 and arrived at Kingston, Jamaica, on 1 December with 459 captives. Two of her 39 crew members died on the voyage. She left Jamaica on 14 January 1793 and arrived back at Liverpool on 2 March. Two of her 39 crew members died on the full voyage.

4th enslaving voyage (1793–1794): Captain James Brown replaced Carson, and on 16 July 1793 acquired a letter of marque. He sailed from Liverpool on 5 August 1793 and gathered captives at Bonny. Princess Royal left Africa on 14 November, and arrived at Jamaica on 28 January 1794. She had embarked 549 captives and landed 539, for a loss rate of 1.8%. She left Jamaica on 1 April and arrived back at Liverpool on 21 May. She had left Liverpool with 64 crew members and she suffered eight crew member deaths on the voyage.

After the passage of Dolben's Act in 1788, masters received a bonus of £100 for a mortality rate of under 2%; the ship's surgeon received £50. For a mortality rate between two and three percent, the bonus was halved. There was no bonus if mortality exceeded 3%. (Note: At the time the monthly wage for a captain of a slave ship out of Bristol was £5 per month.)

== Fate ==
5th enslaving voyage (1794–loss): Brown sailed from Liverpool on 29 July 1794.

Lloyd's List reported on 12 May 1795 that a French squadron had captured Princess Royal, Brown, master, of Liverpool, in the Bonny River. The capture occurred between 22 and 29 December 1794. The French also captured the slavers Eliza and Vulture during the same period. Lloyd's List reported on 27 October that Princess Royal, Brown, master, was among a number of vessels that a French squadron had captured and taken into Cadiz. Princess Royal had not embarked any slaves before the French captured her.

In 1794, 25 British slave ships were lost; three were lost on the coast of Africa. During the period 1793 to 1807, war, rather than maritime hazards or resistance by the captives, was the greatest cause of vessel losses among British slave vessels.
