= HMS Danae (1779) =

Eighteenth century Royal Navy frigate

History

France
- Name: La Danae
- Builder: Antoine Groignard
- Laid down: September 1762
- Launched: 22 October 1763
- In service: 1763–1779
- Captured: 13 May 1779
- Fate: Commissioned into Royal Navy

Great Britain
- Name: HMS Danae
- Acquired: By capture 13 May 1779
- Commissioned: December 1779
- Decommissioned: February 1783
- In service: 1779–1797
- Fate: Sold out of service, October 1797

General characteristics
- Class & type: 28-gun fifth-rate sailing frigate
- Tons burthen: 688 77/94 bm
- Length: 129 ft 3 in (39.4 m) (gun deck); 107 ft 3 in (32.7 m) (keel)
- Beam: 34 ft 9 in (10.6 m)
- Depth of hold: 10 ft 6 in (3.20 m)
- Sail plan: Full-rigged ship
- Complement: 250 (French service); 220 (British service)
- Armament: French service: 32 × 8-pounder guns; British service: Upper deck: 26 × 9-pounder guns; QD: 4 × 6-pounder guns; Fc: 2 × 6-pounder guns

HMS Danae was a 32-gun sailing frigate built for the French Navy in 1763 and captured by the British in the action of 13 May 1779, during the Anglo-French War. Following her capture she was commissioned into the Royal Navy as a convoy escort for merchant vessels sailing between England and Quebec. Paid off in 1783, she was retained for harbour service in England until 1797 when she was sold into private hands.

== French service ==
Danae was laid down in September 1762 at the naval foundry in Indret, later known as Nantes. Her design followed a standard architectural plan for 8-pounder frigates pioneered by shipwright Antoine Groignard, including increased stowage and a strengthened frame for longer service at sea. Despite being intended for use during the Seven Years' War against England, delays in construction meant she was not ready for launch until October 1763 – eight months after the war itself had concluded with the Treaty of Paris. As built, Danae was 129 ft 3 in (39.4 m) long with a 107 ft 3 in (32.7 m) keel, a beam of 34 ft 9 in (10.59 m), and a hold depth of 10 ft 6 in (3.2 m). Her armament comprised 32 8-pounder guns located along her gun deck, quarterdeck and forecastle. Her crew numbered 250 men.

Placed back in active service for the Anglo-French War in 1779, she was selected to lead the naval escort for 1500 French troops in an attempted invasion of Jersey. For this purpose she was put to sea in late April 1779, in the company of the 26-gun frigate Diane and four smaller gunships. On 1 May a landing at Saint Ouen, Jersey was thwarted by local militia and a detachment of Seaforth Highlanders, and the decision was made to return the fleet to Saint-Malo. However, word of the French landing had reached Portsmouth and a small British fleet was put to sea to cut off its withdrawal. The French and British fleets met at Coutances on 13 May in the action of 13 May 1779. The French vessels had anchored under the protection of a small artillery battery on the coast, but chose not to give battle as the British approached. The frigate Diane raised sail escaped into the port but Danae and the four small craft were run aground, with their crews then fleeing overland. The British, commanded by Sir James Wallace in the 50-gun Royal Navy vessel HMS Experiment, silenced the battery and then went ashore to refloat Danae and three other craft. The captured vessels were all brought to Portsmouth Dockyard as prizes. (Note: Sources disagree on the number of Danae's guns at the time of capture, as either 26 or 32.)

== British service ==
Danae remained at anchor for the next six months while Admiralty contemplated her potential reuse. There were obstacles to returning her to service. First, her 8-pounder guns were considered a relic of previous wars in an era where 12- and 18-pounder naval cannons were common. Second, recent advances in frigate design had left Danae slower and less seaworthy than her contemporaries in British service, being more than 100 tons burthen larger than similar vessels without notable improvements in durability. Eventually she was recommissioned for convoy escort duties to British Quebec, making her first voyage as a Royal Navy vessel in May 1780 and remaining in active convoy service between England, Newfoundland and the West Indies, until the end of the war three years later. In late 1780 she overhauled and captured The Jack, a 14-gun American privateer which was brought into port in Quebec as a prize.

Paid off in February 1783, Danae returned to England via Woolwich Dockyard to undergo minor repairs. There she was left at anchor with a skeleton crew as part of a nominal harbour service fleet. Never refitted for sea, the ageing vessel was finally decommissioned and sold at auction in October 1797.

== Bibliography ==
- Clowes, William Laird (1899). The Royal Navy: A History from the Earliest Times to the Present. Vol. 4. London: Sampson, Low, Marston and Company.
- Winfield, Rif (2014). British Warships of the Age of Sail 1793–1817: Design, Construction, Careers and Fates. Barnsley, United Kingdom: Seaforth. ISBN 9781844157174.

== See also ==
- List of ships captured in the 18th century
