= HMS Resource (1778) =

Enterprise-class Royal Navy frigate

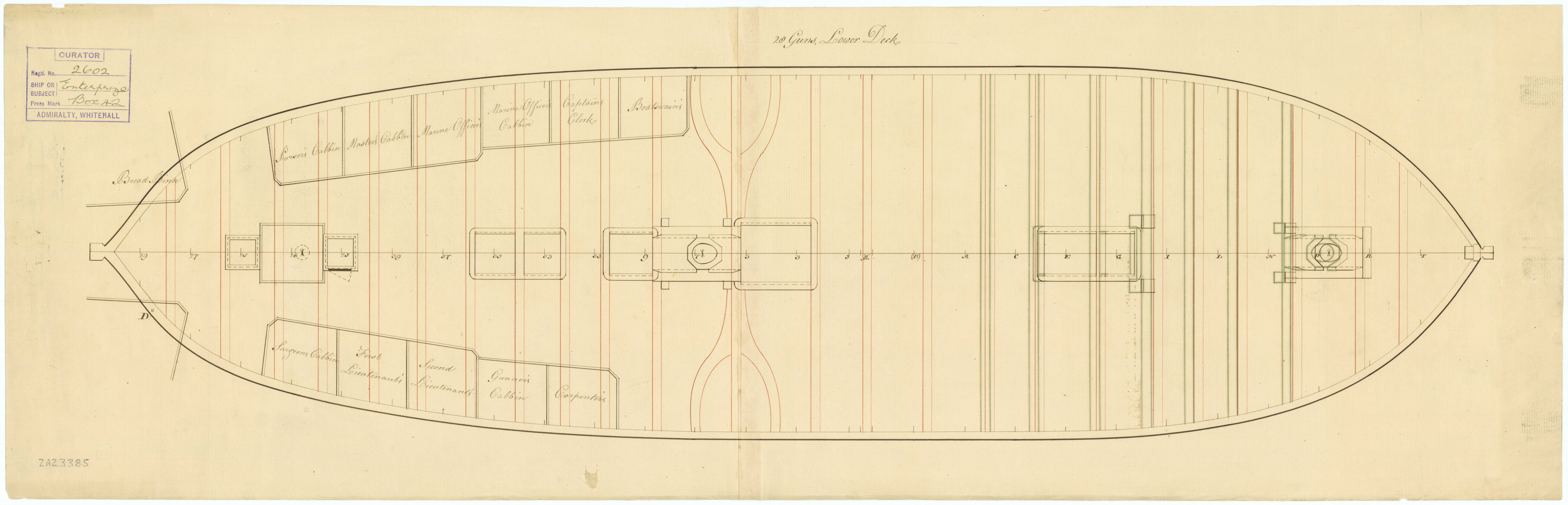
- Plan of the lower deck of Resource

History

Great Britain
- Name: HMS Resource
- Ordered: 30 September 1777
- Builder: John Randall & Co, Rotherhithe
- Laid down: November 1777
- Launched: 10 August 1778
- Completed: 2 October 1778 (at Deptford Dockyard)
- Commissioned: July 1778
- Renamed: Enterprise 17 April 1806
- Honours and awards: Naval General Service Medal with clasp "Egypt"
- Fate: Sold to break up 28 August 1816

General characteristics
- Class & type: 28-gun Enterprise-class sixth-rate frigate
- Tons burthen: 60334/94 (bm)
- Length: 120 ft 8 in (36.78 m) (overall); 99 ft 7 in (30.35 m) (keel)
- Beam: 33 ft 9 in (10.3 m)
- Depth of hold: 11 ft 0 1/2 in (3.366 m)
- Sail plan: Full-rigged ship
- Complement: 200 officers and men
- Armament: Upper deck: 24 × 9-pounder guns; QD: 4 × 6-pounder guns + 4 × 18-pounder carronades; Fc: 2 × 18-pounder carronades; Also: 12 × swivel guns

HMS Resource was a 28-gun Enterprise-class sixth-rate frigate of the Royal Navy. She was launched in 1778 and sold for breaking up in 1816.

== Career ==
Resource was first commissioned in July 1778 under the command of Captain Patrick Fotheringham.

On 19 April 1781 Resource recaptured the 20-gun post ship Unicorn, which the French frigate Andromaque had captured on 4 September 1780. Resource had reached Cape Blaise by noon and at 2pm spotted a strange sail. By 4:30 Resource was close enough that both vessels began to exchange fire. After an hour and a half, the French vessel struck. She turned out to be Unicorn, and armed with twenty 9-pounder guns and eight 12-pounder carronades. She had a crew of 181 men under the command of Chevalier de St. Ture. In the engagement, Resource lost 15 men killed and 30 wounded; Unicorn lost eight men killed and 30 wounded, four of whom died later.

Ten crew members were drowned in October 1799 when the ship's boat foundered in The Downs while returning to Resource after a journey to the shore. The dead included the captain of marines and the ship's purser.

Because Resource served in the navy's Egyptian campaign (8 March to 2 September 1801), her officers and crew qualified for the clasp "Egypt" to the Naval General Service Medal that the Admiralty authorised in 1850 for all surviving claimants. (Note: A first-class share of the prize money awarded in April 1823 was worth £34 2s 4d; a fifth-class share, that of a seaman, was worth 3s 11½d. The amount was small as the total had to be shared between 79 vessels and the entire army contingent.)

With the resumption of war with France in 1803 Britain feared an invasion from France. Around 24 September 1803 the Admiralty decided to bring Unite, Modeste, Heroine, Solebay, Daedalus, Quebec, Iris, Retribution, Vestal, and Resource, out of ordinary and to sail them under jury rig to Long Reach to rearm. They were then to proceed to the Lower Hope, to be moored across the River for the protection of the Thames. Trinity House would be responsible for manning them.

Between September and October 1803 Resource was at Deptford being refitted for Trinity House. In May 1805 Resource was still at Lower Hope in Ordinary, serving as a floating battery. On 17 April 1806 Resource was renamed Enterprise and assigned to service off the Tower of London.

== Fate ==
The "Principal Officers and Commissioners of His Majesty's Navy" offered "Enterprise, of 28 guns and 603 tons", "lying at Deptford" for sale on 28 August 1816. She was sold on that day for £1,420.
