= James Wallace (Royal Navy officer) =

Royal Navy Admiral (1731–1803)

Admiral Sir James Wallace
- Born: 1731; Loddon, Norfolk
- Died: 6 March 1803 (aged 71–72)
- Military career
- Allegiance: Kingdom of Great Britain
- Branch: Royal Navy
- Service years: 1746–1797
- Rank: Admiral
- Commands: HMS Rose; HMS Experiment

Viceregal styles of Sir James Wallace
- Reference style: His Excellency
- Spoken style: Your Excellency

Admiral Sir James Wallace (1731–6 March 1803) was an officer of the Royal Navy. He served for a time as a colonial governor.

== Career in England ==
Wallace was born in Loddon, Norfolk in 1731 and was the son of Thomas and Mary (née Beamish) Wallace (married 1725) of Loddon. He had a brother William Wallace (b. 1730) and a sister Mary Wallace (b. 1727). His grandfather William Wallace was a son of William Wallace (b. 1632) a younger brother of Thomas Wallace the 2nd Baronet of Craige. His uncle James Wallace (b. 1691 d. 1778) reared his illegitimate daughter Frances (b. 1751). He entered the Royal Navy in 1746. He was promoted to lieutenant in 1755, and having served in the West Indies and Mediterranean in 1760, he was promoted to commander in 1762. He joined the North American Station in 1763.

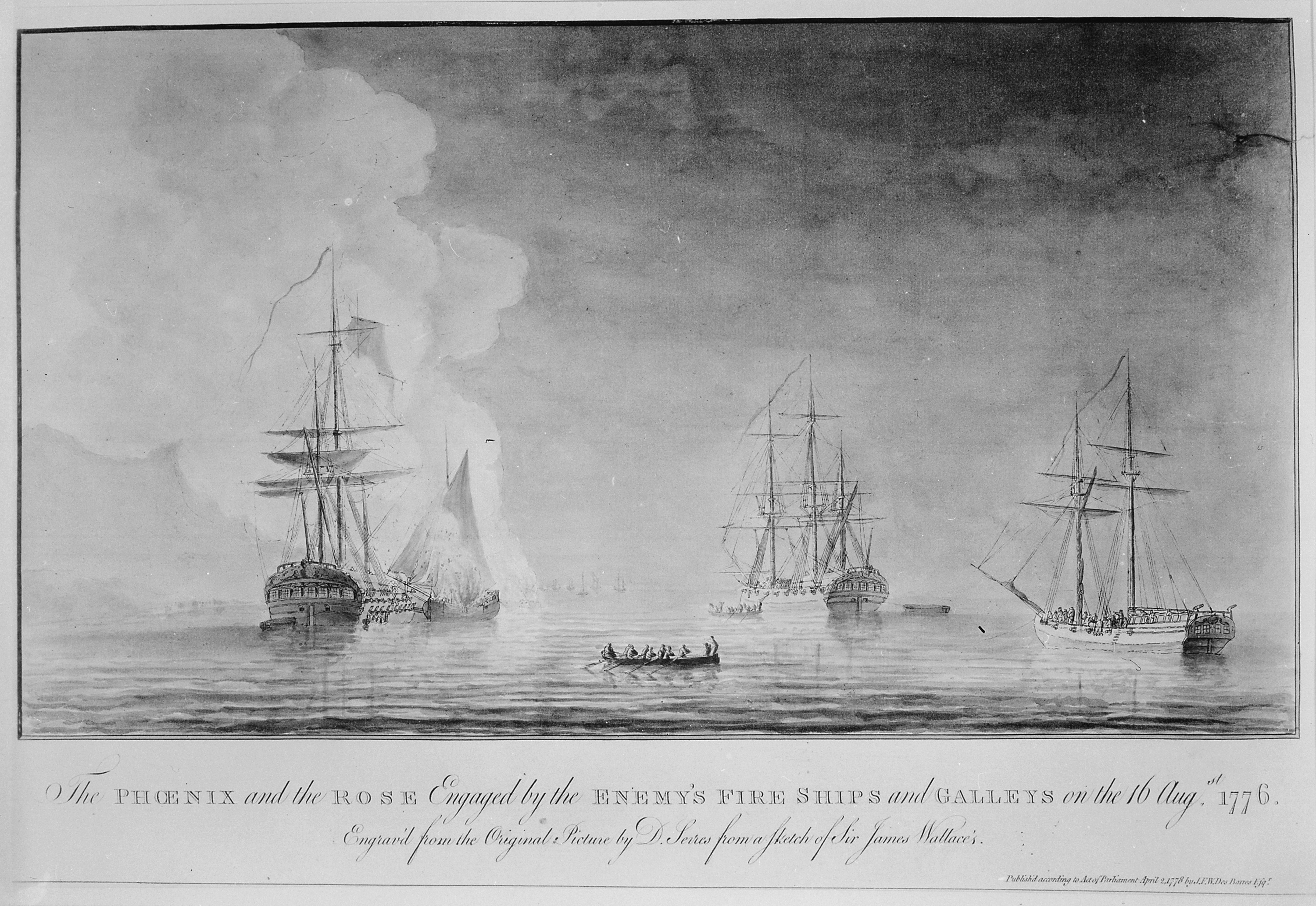
The Phoenix and the Rose engaged by the enemy's fire ships and galleys on 16 August 1776. Engraving by Dominic Serres after a sketch by Sir James Wallace

== An American loyalist ==
Promoted to post-captain, Wallace was given command of the sixth-rate HMS Rose in November 1771. In 1774 Wallace set sail in Rose for North America where he was to be based. He married Anne (or Ann) Wright in 1775 in Georgia. In July 1776 Wallace became the captain of HMS Experiment (a 50-gun ship). Wallace was sent to England with the military dispatches in 1777 and was knighted on 13 February 1777.

In 1778 the American rebels seized the British ship Alert and quickly outfitting it the American rebels used it to set fire to two other vessels carrying hay. Wallace came to the rescue with his ship Experiment and recaptured Alert and by quick action Wallace saved the ship from being burnt by the rebels.

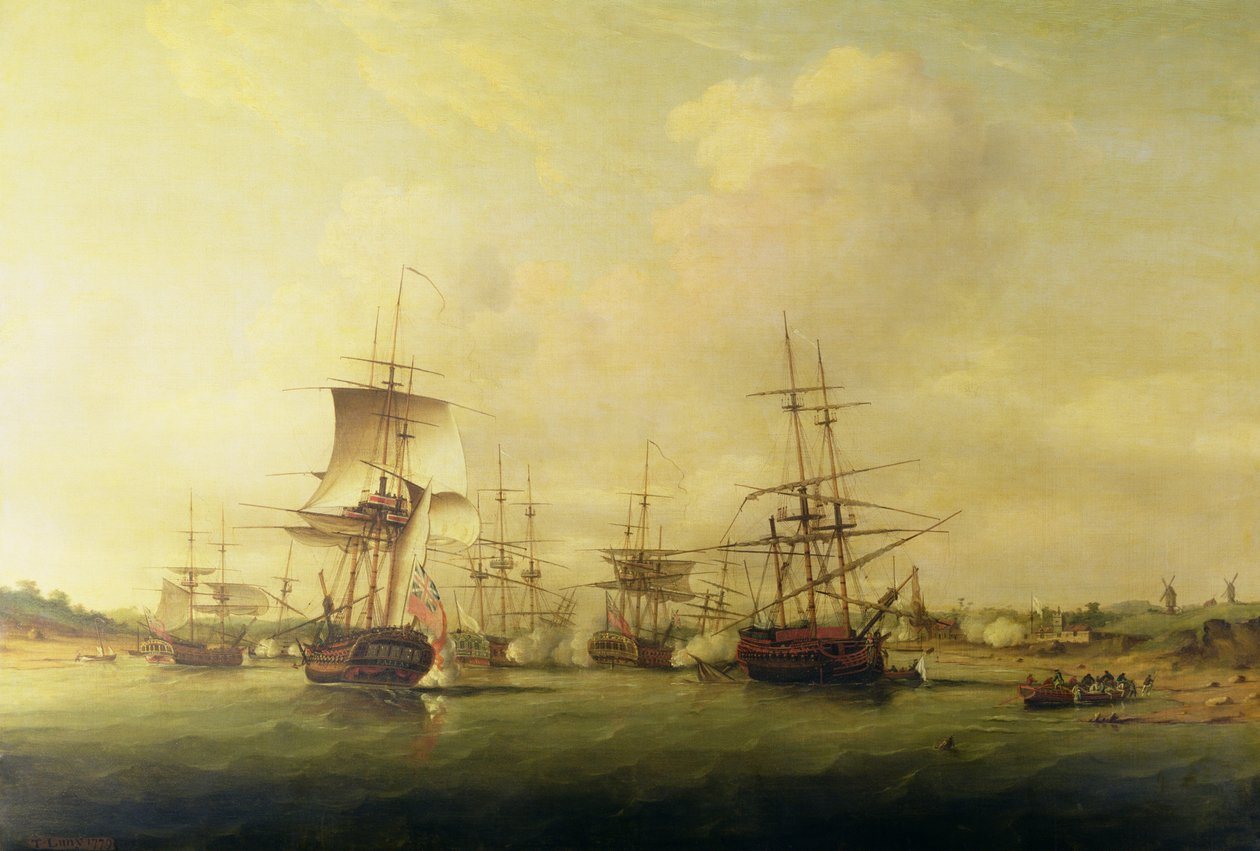
Wallace was in command of HMS Experiment in the Action of 13 May 1779

On 24 September 1779 Wallace and his ship Experiment along with 20 British officers and 30,000 pounds worth of silver were captured by Sagittaire off Hilton Head.

The Royal Navy Man of War HMS Experiment had lost her masts and bowsprit in a gale while she was on her way from New York to Savannah...Also on board was Major General Garth, who was supposed to replace Maj. Gen. Augustine Prevost as commander in Savannah...At 3:45 pm, the Experiment spotted three large sails in the distance. Sir James Wallace, the captain of the Experiment, tried to put as much distance between him and the unknown ships as he could. 45 minutes later, two more ships appeared to the west also bearing down on him. At 8 pm that night, the unknown ships hoisted the French colors and closed with the Experiment. The French ship of the line Sagittair gave the Experiment two broadsides. Due to the range, only a few shots reached the Experiment. Capt. Wallace hoisted more sail and put some distance from the Sagittair. At 8:30 pm, Capt. Wallace decided to fight, hoisted his colors, and came to action. In a very short time every single one of the French ships, three ships of the line and two frigates, were within range of the Experiment. After having his masts shot away, Capt. Wallace finally surrendered.

He was taken to France as a prisoner and later returned in February 1780 from France to England.

== Life after American independence ==
In April 1782 he was in the West Indies serving under Admiral Rodney at the Battle of the Saintes.

In 1783 Sir James Wallace and his wife Lady Wallace (née Ann Wright (b. 1749) daughter of Sir James Wright) along with members of Lady Wallace's family the Wrights were granted land in Jamaica as compensation for their lost estates in America. (Lady Wallace (née Ann Wright) should not be confused with another Lady Wallace (née Eglantine Maxwell) who was a literary personality who was married to Sir Thomas Dunlop Wallace.)

From 1782 he leased Hanworth House where his family lived for some years. Also in 1783 Sir James Wallace was involved in a complicated assault case at which Charles Bourne accused him of assaulting him when they were on the ship Warrior in 1782 on a journey to Jamaica and then in Bath Charles Bourne challenged Sir James Wallace to a duel which Wallace declined.

On 12 April 1794, Wallace was promoted to rear-admiral of the white and appointed commander-in-chief and governor of Newfoundland. During his governorship Wallace defended the coast of Newfoundland from French privateers. In August 1796 Wallace's leadership successfully defended St. John's against a French squadron of seven ships and three frigates and raised a militia known as "Skinner's Fencibles". He was promoted to vice-admiral of the white in 1795.

He departed Newfoundland in 1797 for England, and left active service. He was promoted to vice-admiral of the red in 1799 and to admiral of the blue in 1801. He died in London on 6 March 1803. He is buried at Hanworth with his uncle James Wallace and his supposed younger cousin Frances Grey Wallace the mother of Sir James Wallace Sleigh. Sir James Wallace's will confirmed that his wife was still alive at the time of his death as he mentions her as Lady Ann Wallace and her father as 'Sir James Wright the former governor of Georgia' and Wallace leaves his estate and properties and that coming from her father to her and their daughter Mary Wallace. The will also mentions Frances Sleigh (who is later buried with James and his uncle her presumed father) and her children . It is possible that Frances Gray Wallace (who married William Sleigh) was Admiral James Wallace's illegitimate daughter who was reared by his uncle as his own daughter. In the records of his life he also spent a lot of time with Frances Sleigh and her son Sir James Wallace Sleigh (who became a General and fought with Wellington at Waterloo).

== See also ==
- Governors of Newfoundland

Political offices
Preceded by Sir Richard King	Commodore Governor of Newfoundland; 1794–1796	Succeeded by William Waldegrave
