= HMS Unicorn (1776) =

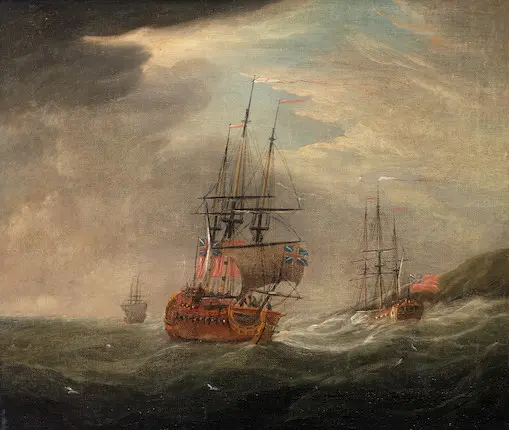
- Unicorn depicted in three positions, by Francis Swaine

History

Great Britain
- Name: Unicorn
- Namesake: Unicorn
- Ordered: 30 October 1775
- Builder: John Randall, Rotherhithe
- Laid down: November 1775
- Launched: 23 March 1776
- Christened: 17 November 1775
- Commissioned: April 1776
- Captured: 4 September 1780

France
- Name: Licorne
- Acquired: 4 September 1780
- Captured: 20 April 1781

Great Britain
- Name: Unicorn Prize
- Acquired: 20 April 1781
- Commissioned: September 1782
- Out of service: July 1786
- Fate: Broken up, August 1787

General characteristics
- Class & type: Sixth-rate Sphinx-class post ship
- Tons burthen: 43358/94 (bm)
- Length: 108 ft (32.9 m) (upper deck); 89 ft 4 in (27.2 m) (keel)
- Beam: 30 ft 2 1/2 in (9.2 m)
- Depth of hold: 9 ft 10 in (3 m)
- Propulsion: Sails
- Crew: 140
- Armament: UD: 20 × 9-pounder guns

HMS Unicorn was a 20-gun sixth-rate Sphinx-class post ship of the Royal Navy. Serving in the American Revolutionary War, she was captured by the French in 1781 and renamed Licorne, but was recaptured by the British a year later. Returned to Royal Navy service as Unicorn Prize, she was decommissioned in 1786 and broken up in the following year.

== Design and construction ==
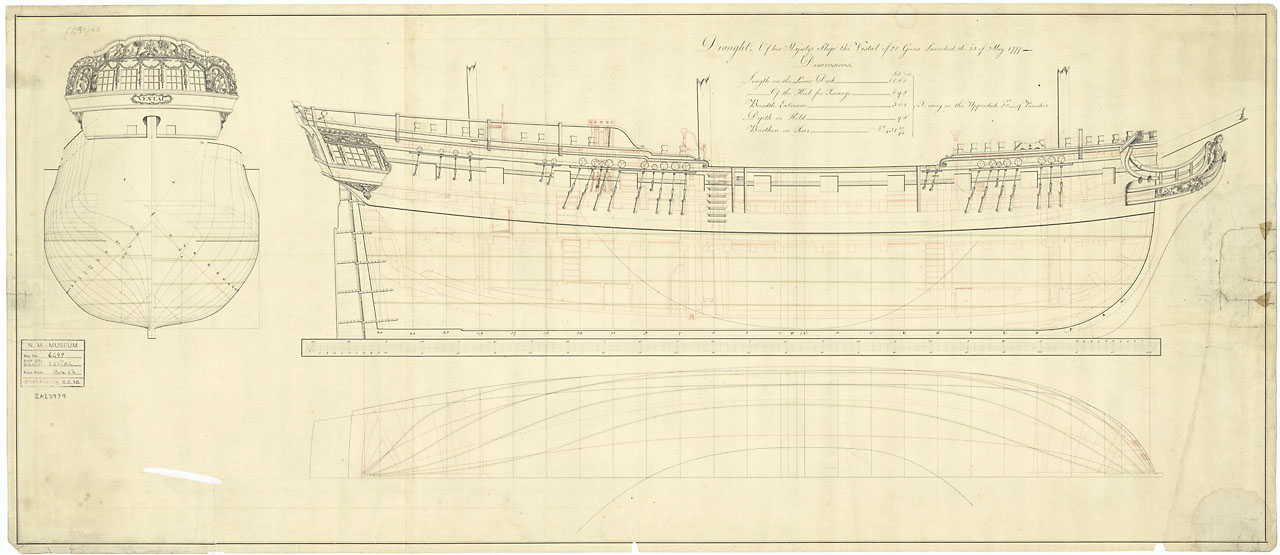
The lines of a Sphinx-class post ship

Unicorn was a 20-gun, 9-pounder Sphinx-class post ship. The class was designed in 1773 by Surveyor of the Navy John Williams. A new class of post ship had not been implemented by the Royal Navy for almost twenty years, and Williams' changes were minor. The Sphinx-class ships were similar to those of the Gibraltar, Seaford, and Squirrel classes of the 1750s, but with finer lines. Ten vessels were ordered to the new design between 1773 and 1776. Following peacetime practice, the first six ships of the class were ordered to Royal Dockyards, but in late 1775 wartime strategy came into place for the American Revolutionary War, and three of the last four Sphinx-class ships were contracted out to civilian dockyards.

Unicorn, the eighth ship of the class, was ordered on 30 October 1775 to be built at Rotherhithe by the shipwright John Randall. Unicorn was laid down in November, and launched on 23 March 1776 with the following dimensions: 108 feet (32.9 m) along the upper deck, 89 feet 4 inches (27.2 m) at the keel, with a beam of 30 feet 2 1/2 inches (9.2 m) and a depth in the hold of 9 feet 10 inches (3 m). The ship measured 43358/94 tons burthen. She was named after the mythical unicorn on 17 November 1775, being the ninth Royal Navy vessel to bear the name.

The fitting out process for Unicorn was completed on 25 May at Woolwich Dockyard, with the ship having cost a total of £8,524 to construct. With a crew complement of 140, the post ship held twenty 9-pounder long guns on her upper deck. With the carronade subsequently introduced to British warships, in 1794 Sphinx-class post ships received four 12-pounder carronades on their quarterdeck, and another two on their forecastle. Unicorn did not survive long enough in service to receive these updates.

== Service ==
Unicorn was commissioned by Captain John Ford in April 1776. The ship escorted a troop convoy from Plymouth on 23 July, sailing for North America. She subsequently captured the American privateer Wolf on 20 September that year. Beginning a string of successes, Unicorn captured the American privateers Warren on 9 September 1777, McClary on 6 February 1778, Reprisal on 19 February, schooner "Sea Flower" on 6 June, and Blaze Castle on 10 or 11 June. On 11 June, 1778 she recaptured sloop "Susannah" 65 leages off Cape Sable. Serving alongside the 50-gun fourth-rate HMS Experiment, she then captured the American 32-gun frigate USS Raleigh on 28 September. Unicorn returned to Britain to be paid off in August 1779, assisting in the recapture of the 14-gun brig HMS Hope on 19 August.

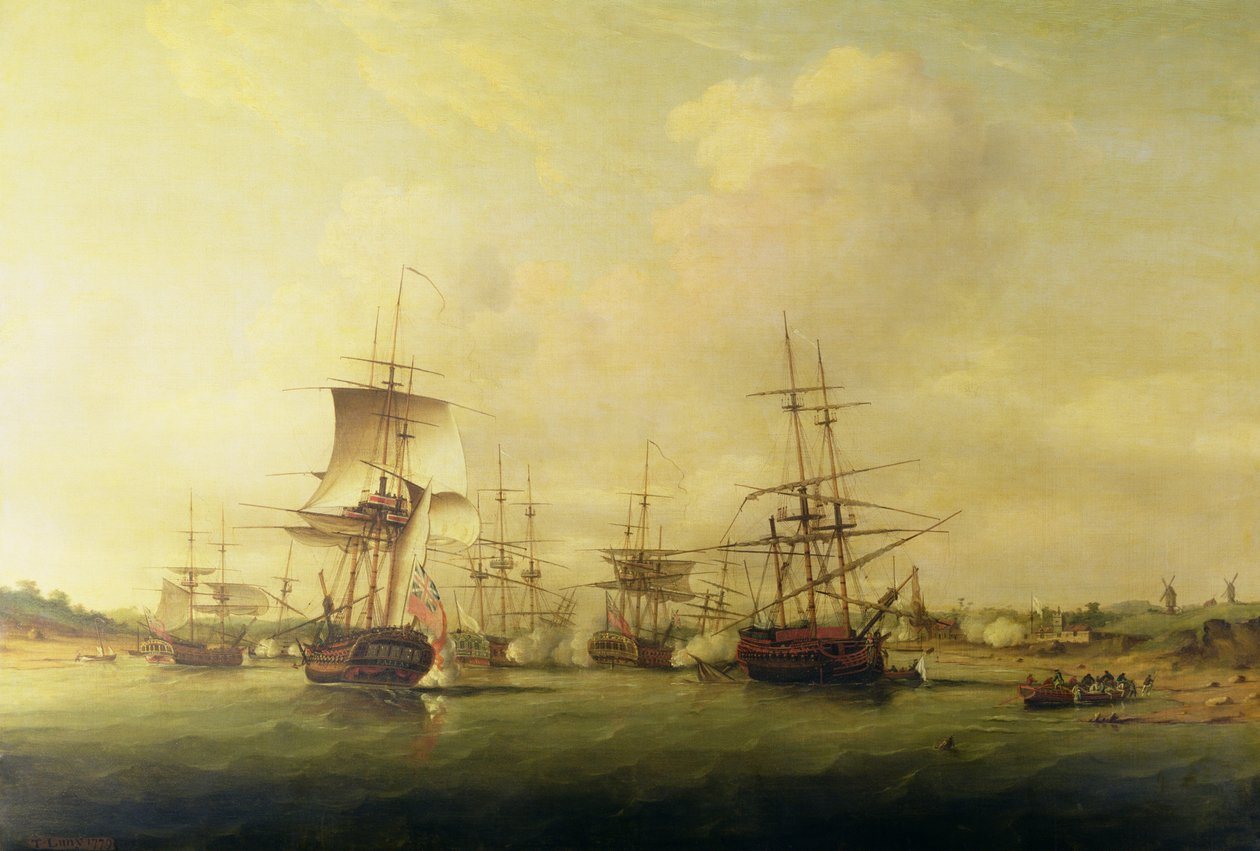
Unicorn fought at the action of 13 May 1779

Unicorn received a refit at Portsmouth Dockyard between September and November, and during this period was recommissioned under the command of Captain Thomas Frederick. Sent to the West Indies, Unicorn was sailing off Tortuga on 4 September 1780 when at 2:30 p.m. she investigated a ship sighting. As Unicorn closed with the unknown sail it was discovered that she had come across the full French fleet. The ship attempted to escape, and was chased by a frigate and two ships of the line. After two hours the French 32-gun frigate Andromaque caught up with Unicorn and fired a single gun at her. Frederick responded by firing a broadside at Andromaque, and the two ships engaged in an hour-long battle, during which Unicorn had much of her rigging destroyed and lost four guns.

Unicorn surrendered when the French 74-gun ship of the line Palmier caught up and began firing at her as well. The British ship had four men killed and thirteen wounded during the battle. Frederick was imprisoned on Martinique and exchanged soon afterwards. Court martialled for the loss of Unicorn, he was found not to be at fault.

The French took Unicorn into service with the French Navy, renaming her Licorne. She continued to serve in the West Indies until she was recaptured by the 28-gun frigate HMS Resource on 20 April 1781. Licorne was not returned to her original name by the British, instead becoming Unicorn Prize. She was refitted at Portsmouth between September 1782 and December 1783, having been recommissioned by Captain Benjamin Archer. Sent to serve in the English Channel and Irish Sea, Unicorn Prize continued there until the end of the American Revolutionary War, being paid off in August 1783.

Unicorn Prize was recommissioned on 16 August, now under the command of Captain St Alban Roy, who was replaced two months later by Captain Charles Stirling. Unicorn Prize sailed to join the Leeward Islands Station on 2 June 1784. She was paid off for a final time in July 1786, and broken up at Deptford Dockyard in August the following year.
