= French frigate Andromaque (1777) =

Nymphe-class frigate

History

France
- Name: Andromaque
- Namesake: Andromache
- Ordered: 29 September 1777
- Builder: Brest
- Laid down: August 1777
- Launched: 24 December 1777
- In service: April 1778
- Fate: Scuttled by fire

General characteristics
- Class & type: Nymphe-class frigate
- Displacement: 1100 tonneaux
- Tons burthen: 600 port tonneaux
- Length: 46.9 m (153 ft 10 in)
- Beam: 11.9 m (39 ft 1 in)
- Height: 5.8 m (19 ft 0 in)
- Sail plan: Full-rigged ship
- Armament: Gun deck: 26 × 12-pounder long guns; Castles: 6 × 6-pounder long guns

Andromaque was a 32-gun Nymphe-class frigate of the French Navy.

== Career ==
Andromaque was commissioned in Brest in 1778 and took part in the American War of Independence. After an overhaul in which she was coppered in April 1780, she captured the British 20-gun post ship HMS Unicorn on 4 October 1780, off Tortuga. The French Navy took Unicorn into service as Licorne.

On 21 April 1781, Andromaque landed troops for the Siege of Pensacola, in the squadron under Monteil.

On 20 April 1782, a 10-ship convoy departed Brest escorted by the 74-gun Protecteur and Pégase, and the frigates Indiscrète and Andromaque. At sunset, at the mouth of the English Channel, the convoy met a British force of three 74-gun ships of the line under John Jervis; in the ensuing action of 20–21 April 1782, Pégase and the 64-gun Actionaire, armed en flûte, were captured.

Andromaque was decommissioned in November 1791 and lied in reserve at Rochefort, until June 1793, when she was armed again. Then was then tasked with convoy escort duty between Rochefort and La Rochelle, under Captain Renaudin. She had a battle against a ship of the line and four Spanish frigates.

In 1794, Andromaque cruised in the Bay of Biscay under Lieutenant Guillotin. Lieutenant Farjenel took command later that year. In 1795, she crossed the Atlantic to Guadeloupe, and Lieutenant Morel took command.

On 22 August 1796, while cruising with a naval division, she sprang a leak and has to detach. She was then chased by the frigate HMS Galatea and the brig HMS Sylph and beached herself in Arcachon Bay to avoid capture. The crew jumped overboard and swam to the shore, 20 men drowning to death. The British launched boats whose parties boarded and took prisoner Andromaque's captain, Lieutenant Morel, and four officers, and rescued a number of Portuguese prisoners who had been the crews of two Brazilian ships that her squadron had captured. A boarding party from Sylph set fire to Andromaque as they left and she was completely burnt. There are reports that after seizing the entire crew, the British kept only the officers and released the seamen, only to open fire on them as they attempted to return ashore.
