= List of ship launches in 1789 =

The list of ship launches in 1789 includes a chronological list of some ships launched in 1789.

Date	Ship	Class	Builder	Location	Country	Notes
20 January	San Hermenegildo	Santa Ana-class ship of the line	José Flo	Havana	(Spain) Cuba	For Spanish Navy.
12 February	Flyvende Fiske	Sloop-of-war		Copenhagen	Denmark-Norway	For Dano-Norwegian Navy.
February	Aletto	Galiot			Republic of Venice	For Venetian Navy.
February	Fortunato Jacob	Full-rigged ship		Venice	Republic of Venice	For Cinque Savi alla Mercanzia.
February	Megera	Galiot			Republic of Venice	For Venetian Navy.
February	Tisifone	Galiot			Republic of Venice	For Venetian Navy.
February	Warren Hastings	Merchantman	Glass	Fort William	Great Britain	For private owner.
8 April	Atrevida	Corvette	Tómas Muñoz	Cádiz	Spain	For Spanish Navy.
8 April	Descubierta	Corvette	Tómas Muñoz	Cádiz	Spain	For Spanish Navy.
12 April	Mariia Magdalin	Third rate	S. I. Afanaseyev	Kherson	Russia	For Imperial Russian Navy.
4 May	Bystraia	Baltic-class xebec	D. Masalsky	Saint Petersburg	Russia	For Imperial Russian Navy.
4 May	Legkaia	Baltic-class xebec	D. Masalsky	Saint Petersburg	Russia	For Imperial Russian Navy.
4 May	Minerva	Baltic-class xebec	D. Masalsky	Saint Petersburg	Russia	For Imperial Russian Navy.
4 May	Skoraia	Baltic-class xebec	D. Masalsky	Saint Petersburg	Russia	For Imperial Russian Navy.
7 May	Bellona	Baltic-class xebec	D. Masalsky	Saint Petersburg	Russia	For Imperial Russian Navy.
7 May	Lebed	Lebed-class cutter	D. Masalsky	Saint Petersburg	Russia	For Imperial Russian Navy.
10 May	Krechet	Sokol-class cutter	D. Masalsky	Saint Petersburg	Russia	For Imperial Russian Navy.
10 May	Sokol	Sokol-class cutter	D. Masalsky	Saint Petersburg	Russia	For Imperial Russian Navy.
13 May	Sviatoi Evsevii	Ches'ma-class ship of the line	Jonathon Coleman	Saint Petersburg	Russia	For Imperial Russian Navy.
13 May	Sviatoi Nikolai Chudotvorets	Ches'ma-class ship of the line	G. Ignatyev	Kronstadt	Russia	For Imperial Russian Navy.
15 May	Baklan	Lebed-class cutter	D. Masalsky	Saint Petersburg	Russia	For Imperial Russian Navy.
15 May	Kronshtadt	Briachislav-class frigate	M. D. Portnov	Arkhangelsk	Russia	For Imperial Russian Navy.
15 May	Parmen	Aziia-class ship of the line	M. D. Portnov	Arkhangelsk	Russia	For Imperial Russian Navy.
16 May	Arhkipelag	Briachislav-class frigate	M. D. Portnov	Arkhangelsk	Russia	For Imperial Russian Navy.
16 May	Boris	Iaroslav-class ship of the line	M. D. Portnov	Arkhangelsk	Russia	For Imperial Russian Navy.
16 May	Diana	Baltic-class xebec	D. Masalsky	Saint Petersburg	Russia	For Imperial Russian Navy.
16 May	Gleb	Iaroslav-class ship of the line	M. D. Portnov	Arkhangelsk	Russia	For Imperial Russian Navy.
16 May	Nikanor	Aziia-class ship of the line	M. D. Portnov	Arkhangelsk	Russia	For Imperial Russian Navy.
16 May	Pimen	Aziia-class ship of the line	M. D. Portnov	Arkhangelsk	Russia	For Imperial Russian Navy.
16 May	Prozerpina	Balti-class xebec	D. Masalsky	Saint Petersburg	Russia	For Imperial Russian Navy.
19 May	Iastreb	Sokol-class cutter	D. Masalsky	Saint Petersburg	Russia	For Imperial Russian Navy.
19 May	Gagava	Lebed-class cutter	D. Masalsky	Saint Petersburg	Russia	For Imperial Russian Navy.
8 June	Aquilon	Téméraire-class ship of the line		Rochefort	Kingdom of France	For French Navy.
27 June	Tsar Konstantin	Pyotr Apostol-class frigate	I. V. Dolzhnikov	Rogozhskaya	Russia	For Imperial Russian Navy.
7 July	Illustrious	Arrogant-class ship of the line	Adams	Bucklers Hard	Great Britain	For Royal Navy.
7 July	Cybèle	Nymphe-class frigate		Brest	Kingdom of France	For French Navy.
6 August	Melpomène	Minerve-class frigate		Toulon	Kingdom of France	For French Navy.
10 August	Aretusa	Fifth rate	Antonio Imbert	Castellamare del Golfo	Kingdom of Sicily	For Royal Sicilian Navy.
15 August	Ulla Fersen	Frigate		Karlskrona	Sweden	For Royal Swedish Navy.
22 August	Fidèle	Félicité-class frigate		Havre de Grâce	Kingdom of France	For French Navy.
24 August	Earl of Abergavenny	East Indiaman	Joseph Graham	Harwich	Great Britain	For British East India Company.
21 September	Embuscade	Frigate	Honoré-Sebastien Vial du Clairbos	Rochefort	Kingdom of France	For French Navy.
September	Rose Hill Packet	Hoy	Robinson Reid	Sydney	(Kingdom of Great Britain) New South Wales	For Arthur Phillip.
5 October	Tre Kroner	Prindsesse Sophia Frederica-class ship of the line	Henrik Gerner	Copenhagen	Denmark-Norway	For Dano-Norwegian Navy.
19 October	Europa	Third rate	Reales Astilleros de Esteiro	A Coruña	Spain	For Spanish Navy.
24 October	Tonnant	Tonnant-class ship of the line	Jean Marguerite Tupinier	Toulon	Kingdom of France	For French Navy.
2 November	Royal Charlotte	East Indiaman	Thomas Pitcher	Northfleet	Great Britain	For British East India Company.
3 November	Hindostan	East Indiaman	William Barnard	Deptford	Great Britain	For Robert Williams.
4 November	Jupiter	Téméraire-class ship of the line		Brest	Kingdom of France	For French Navy.
13 November	Søormen	Cutter	Ernst Wilhelm Stibolt	Copenhagen	Denmark-Norway	For Dano-Norwegian Navy.
15 November	Éole	Téméraire-class ship of the line		Lorient	Kingdom of France	For French Navy.
25 November	Nancy	Schooner		Detroit	(United States) Northwest Territory	For Richardson, Forsythe & Co.
3 December	Serpent	Hound-class sloop	Thomas Pollard	Plymouth Dockyard	Great Britain	For Royal Navy.
16 December	Vengeur	Téméraire-class ship of the line		Brest	Kingdom of France	For French Navy.
18 December	Principe do Brasil	Fifth rate		Lisbon	Portugal	For Portuguese Navy.
December	Ann and Eliza	Merchantman	G. Gillett	Calcutta	India	For private owner.
Unknown date	Active	Merchantman		Bermuda	(Kingdom of Great Britain) Bermuda	For private owner.
Unknown date	Amity Hall	West Indiaman		River Thames	Great Britain	For G. Tarbutt.
Unknown date	Asia	Third rate		Havana	(Spain) Cuba	For Spanish Navy.
Unknown date	Aurora	Merchantman		Whitby	Great Britain	For private owner.
Unknown date	Bahr-i Zafer	Third rate	Ismail Kalfa	Constantinople	Ottoman Empire	For Ottoman Navy.
Unknown date	Bars	Baltic-class half-xebec		Saint Petersburg	Russia	For Imperial Russian Navy.
Unknown date	Bomanear	Full-rigged ship		Bombay	India	For Pestonjee Bomanjee.
Unknown date	Britannia	Merchantman		Surat	India	For Lennox & Co.
Unknown date	Camel	Schooner	Nicholas Bools	Bridport	Great Britain	For Mr. Hounsell, Mr. Roberts, Mr. Travers & Bull Way.
Unknown date	Discovery	Survey ship	Randall, Gray & Brent	Rotherhithe	Great Britain	For Royal Navy.
Unknown date	Drakon	Baltic-class half-xebec		Saint Petersburg	Russia	For Imperial Russian Navy.
Unknown date	Echo	Full-rigged ship		Amsterdam	Dutch Republic	For Dutch Navy.
Unknown date	Eliza	Merchantman			(Kingdom of Great Britain) Colony of New Brunswick	For private owner.
Unknown date	Experiment	Slave ship		River Thames	Great Britain	For Anthony Calvert, Thomas King and William Camden.
Unknown date	Feyz-i Hüda	Third rate	Nikoli Kalfa	Sinop	Ottoman Empire	For Ottoman Navy.
Unknown date	Grenada Packet	West Indiaman		Cork	Ireland	For John Roche.
Unknown date	Hannah	Full-rigged ship		Bombay	India	For private owner.
Unknown date	Holderness	Merchantman{		Selby	Great Britain	For Green & Co.
Unknown date	Hope	Brigantine		Kittery, Maine	United States	For Thomas Handasyd Perkins, Russel Sturgis and James Magee.
Unknown date	King George	Full-rigged ship		Bombay	India	For private owner.
Unknown date	Kit	Baltic-class half-xebec		Saint Petersburg	Russia	For Imperial Russian Navy.
Unknown date	Komeet	Brig of war		Amsterdam	Dutch Republic	For Dutch Navy.
Unknown date	Latona	Merchantman	John Barry	Whitby	Great Britain	For John & Francis Barry.
Unknown date	Leuuw	East Indiaman			Dutch Republic	For Dutch East India Company.
Unknown date	Lev	Baltic-class half-xebec		Saint Petersburg	Russia	For Imperial Russian Navy.
Unknown date	Mary Anne	Brigantine	Nicholas Bools	Bridport	Great Britain	For Mr. Hounsell, Mr. Roberts, Mr. Travers & Bull Way.
Unknown date	Medved	Baltic-class half-xebec		Saint Petersburg	Russia	For Imperial Russian Navy.
Unknown date	Neptunus	Third rate		Copenhagen	Denmark-Norway	For Dano-Norwegian Navy.
Unknown date	Novopavlosk	Bomb vessel	S. I. Afanaseyev	Novopavlovsk	Russia	For Imperial Russian Navy.
Unknown date	Old Dick	Merchantman		Bermuda	(Kingdom of Great Britain) Bermuda	For private owner.
Unknown date	Oryol	Baltic-class half-xebec		Saint Petersburg	Russia	For Imperial Russian Navy.
Unknown date	Oosthuizen	East Indiaman		Hoorn	Dutch Republic	For Dutch East India Company.
Unknown date	Peggy	Schooner			Isle of Man	For George Quayle.
Unknown date	Placentia	Placentia-class sloop	Jeffrey & Start	Newfoundland	(Kingdom of Great Britain) Newfoundland Colony	For Royal Navy.
Unknown date	President Washington	Merchantman		Rhode Island	United States	For private owner.
Unknown date	Prince George	West Indiaman		River Thames	Great Britain	For Fryer & Co.
Unknown date	Prince of Wales	Full-rigged ship		Hull	Great Britain	For P. Green.
Unknown date	Robuste	Slave ship		Nantes	Kingdom of France	For Boutellier Père et Fils.
Unknown date	Rys	Baltic-class half-xebec		Saint Petersburg	Russia	For Imperial Russian Navy.
Unknown date	Saelland	Prindsesse Sophia Frederica-class ship of the line	Henrik Garner	Copenhagen	Denmark-Norway	For Dano-Norwegian Navy.
Unknown date	Sergei Radonezhskii	Bomb vessel	Kotosov	Khoper	Russia	For Imperial Russian Navy.
Unknown date	Shaw Muncher	full-rigged ship		Bombay	India	For private owner.
Unknown date	Slon	Baltic-class half-xebec		Saint Petersburg	Russia	For Imperial Russian Navy.
Unknown date	Sovereign	Merchantman	Edward Mosley	Howdon	Great Britain	For Mr. Brown.
Unknown date	Sviatoi Nikon	Bomb vessel	Kotosov	Khoper	Russia	For Imperial Russian Navy.
Unknown date	Tajbux	Full-rigged ship		Bombay	India	For Pestonjee Bomanjee.
Unknown date	Tarleton	Slave ship		Liverpool	Great Britain	For Tarleton & Co.
Unknown date	Tigr	Baltic-class half-xebec		Saint Petersburg	Russia	For Imperial Russian Navy.
Unknown date	Trepassey	Placentia-class sloop	Lester & Stone	Newfoundland	(Kingdom of Great Britain) Newfoundland Colony	For Royal Navy.
Unknown date	Triton	Sixth rate		Amsterdam	Dutch Republic	For Dutch Navy.
Unknown date	Volk	Baltic-class half-xebec		Saint Petersburg	Russia	For Imperial Russian Navy.
Unknown date	Warren Hastings	East Indiaman	George Gillet	Calcutta	India	For Fairlie & Co.
Unknown date	Wildman	Merchantman	John Brockbank	Lancaster	Great Britain	For private owner.
Unknown date	No. 1 chain boat	Chain boat	Henry Adams	Bucklers Hard	Great Britain	For Royal Navy.
Unknown date	Name unknown	Privateer			Kingdom of France	For private owner.
Unknown date	Name unknown	Merchantman			Spain	For private owner.
