= Placentia-class sloop =

Class overview
- Name: Placentia class
- Operators: Royal Navy
- Planned: 2
- Completed: 2
- Lost: 1
- Retired: 1

General characteristics
- Class & type: Placentia class
- Type: Sloop
- Tons burthen: 42 33/94 (bm)
- Length: 44 ft 7 in (13.59 m) (overall); 35 ft 4 5/8 in (10.8 m) (keel)
- Beam: 15 ft 0 in (4.6 m)
- Depth of hold: 8 ft 4 in (2.5 m)
- Propulsion: Sails
- Sail plan: Sloop
- Complement: Six; later eight
- Armament: 4 × ½-pounder swivel guns

The Placentia class was a class of two sloops of the Royal Navy. John Henslow designed the small sloops for coastal patrol duties off Newfoundland. Their role was "to protect the fisheries and inquiring into abuses. The vessels would sit in the harbour of St Johns over the winter, and then in the spring would be fitted out to visit the ports on the station as soon as the ice had melted.

Jahleel Brenton, who would command Trepassey in 1793, provides an interesting description of her and her sister ship. They were, he said, "…facetiously termed by naval men, a machine for making officers. The vessels initially served in this role through the regular rotation of commanders. Each year the Admiralty would place one lieutenant in command of one of them, and the admiral of the station would appoint the lieutenant commanding the other. The outgoing lieutenants would at the end of the year, or at least just before the admiral of the station left for the winter, go through a nominal invaliding. The Admiralty and the admiral would then appoint their successors from "the cockpit of the Admiral's ship.

Of the eight peacetime (1789-1793) commanders, at least five went on to have distinguished careers:

- Sir Jahleel Brenton, 1st Baronet
- Sir Peter Halkett, 6th Baronet
- Honourable Charles Herbert
- Sir Charles Rowley, 1st Baronet
- Admiral Alexander Shippard

Each vessel’s crew consisted of a commander, a pilot, and five men. The pilot performed the functions of every class of officer below the commander. In 1792 or so, the Admiralty augmented each vessel’s establishment with two midshipmen.

Placentia was lost before the outbreak of the French Revolutionary Wars. Trepassey served into the Napoleonic Wars, but was too small and weakly armed to serve a major naval role. The Placentia-class sloops were even more puny than the much-maligned Ballahou and Cuckoo-class schooners of the Napoleonic period.

== Ships ==
Name	Builder	Begun	Launched	Fate
Placentia (1789)	Jeffrey & Start, Newfoundland	May 1789	1789	Wrecked May 1794
Trepassey (1789)	Lester & Stone, Newfoundland	May 1789	1789	Last listed 1807
