= John Henslow =

John Henslow may refer to:

- Sir John Henslow (Surveyor of the Navy) (1730–1815), a naval architect
- John Stevens Henslow (1796–1861), botanist and Charles Darwin's mentor
