= Grenada Packet (ship) =

Several vessels have been named Grenada Packet:

- Grenada Packet (1789 ship) was launched in Cork in 1789 as a West Indiaman. A nominally French privateer captured her in 1794; she burnt accidentally at Savannah while awaiting trial.
- Grenada Packet (1804), Otway, master, was a vessel that the residents of Grenada had purchased to protect their trade. She was sailing from St Vincent to Bermuda when in 1804 a French privateer captured her and carried her into Cumaná.
- Grenada Packet (1814): Lloyd's List reported in May 1814 that the American privateer America had captured Grenada Packet at 33°N 51°W as Grenada Packet was sailing from Bermuda to Madeira. Another report, published in June stated that Grenada Packet had been destroyed. The United States privateer schooner York, of Baltimore, Burch, master, 14 cannons and 100 men, came upon Grenada Packet on 10 April with only two men on board, Darrell (her original master), and a Swede. At York's approach the prize crew from American, of Salem, had taken to Grenada Packet's boats and sailed for the coast, fearing that York was a British naval vessel. Grenada Packet had a cargo of wheat that Burch estimated as being worth $8000. He took Darrell and the Swede off Grenada Packet and burnt her.
