= Aaron Smith (mariner) =

British seaman

- Occupation: Seaman

Aaron Smith (fl. 1823) was a British seaman who was kidnapped by pirates.

== Biography ==
Smith was on 19 December 1823 tried at the Old Bailey on various charges of piracy in the West Indies, and especially of having plundered the ship Victoria of coffee, dyewood, and other articles to the value of 30,000l., and also of having plundered the ship Industry. The alleged facts were proved by competent witnesses; Smith's defence was that he was an unwilling agent. The story which he related in court was that, having been for about two years in the West Indies, he shipped as first mate on board the Zephyr brig; which sailed from Kingston for England in the end of June 1822. The master, an ignorant and obstinate man, had been warned against the leeward passage, which, however, he preferred as the shortest. The warning was justified, and the brig was taken possession of by a schooner manned by Spaniards and half-breeds, who plundered her of whatever seemed valuable, forced the master by threats of torture to deliver up what money he had on board, and then let them go, detaining Smith to act as navigator and interpreter, in which capacity he was compelled, by threats and actual torture, to act at the plundering of the Victoria, the Industry, and other vessels. After several months' detention he succeeded in escaping, but at Havana was recognised as one of the pirates, arrested, and thrown into prison; and as he refused or was unable to bribe the Spanish magistrates, who offered to release him on payment of one hundred doubloons, he was handed over to Sir Charles Rowley, the English commander-in-chief at Jamaica, and was brought to England in irons on board the Sybille. His tale, in part substantiated by witnesses, carried conviction to the judge, who summed up strongly in his favour; and the jury, without hesitation, returned a verdict of ‘Not guilty.’ He was described as ‘a very genteel-looking young man, apparently about thirty years old.’ ‘The Atrocities of the Pirates: a Faithful Narrative of [Smith's] Unparalleled Sufferings during his Captivity in Cuba’ (1824), was apparently a much embellished record by a sympathising friend.

During the following years Smith continued at sea, and had command of a vessel in the China trade. In 1834 he retired and lived in London, doing, apparently, a little business as an underwriter, and also, it was said, as a bill discounter. On 31 January 1850 he attended a meeting at the London Tavern, called to petition parliament to do away with ‘head money’ for Borneo pirates, i.e. money paid by the government in lieu of prize-money for pirates officially sworn to have been killed. It was said that the pirates had no existence, and that harmless fishermen or people picked up on shore were killed for the head money. Smith—described as a burly seafaring man—stood up to contradict this, and said the pirates were very real; he himself had been attacked by them and his ship very nearly taken. The statement was referred to in the House of Commons on 23 May, in the debate on the navy estimates, and Mr. Cobden remarked that Smith was himself a pirate and deserved to be punished as such. The speech was reported in the ‘Times’ of the 24th, and on the 25th a Mr. E. Garbett wrote, in Smith's name, to Cobden, requesting an interview. This Cobden refused, and an angry correspondence followed (Times, 1 June), which brought up a Captain Cook, who wrote to say that Smith was certainly a pirate; that he himself had been captured and ill-treated by him (ib. 20 June). On this Smith brought an action for libel against Cook, who pleaded justification, and the case virtually resolved itself into trying Smith over again for acts of piracy said to have been committed twenty-eight years before, for which he had already been tried and acquitted. But by this time Smith's witnesses were either dead or lost sight of; there was no official report of the former trial, and Smith's ‘Narrative’ was clearly padded with a romantic love adventure, and necessarily open to suspicion. Eventually, however, a verdict was given in Smith's favour, but with damages of only 10l. (ib. 10 and 13 Dec.) He was at this time living in Camden Town, where he still was in 1852, after which his name disappears from the ‘London Directory.’
