= HMS Trepassey (1789) =

Sloop of the Royal Navy

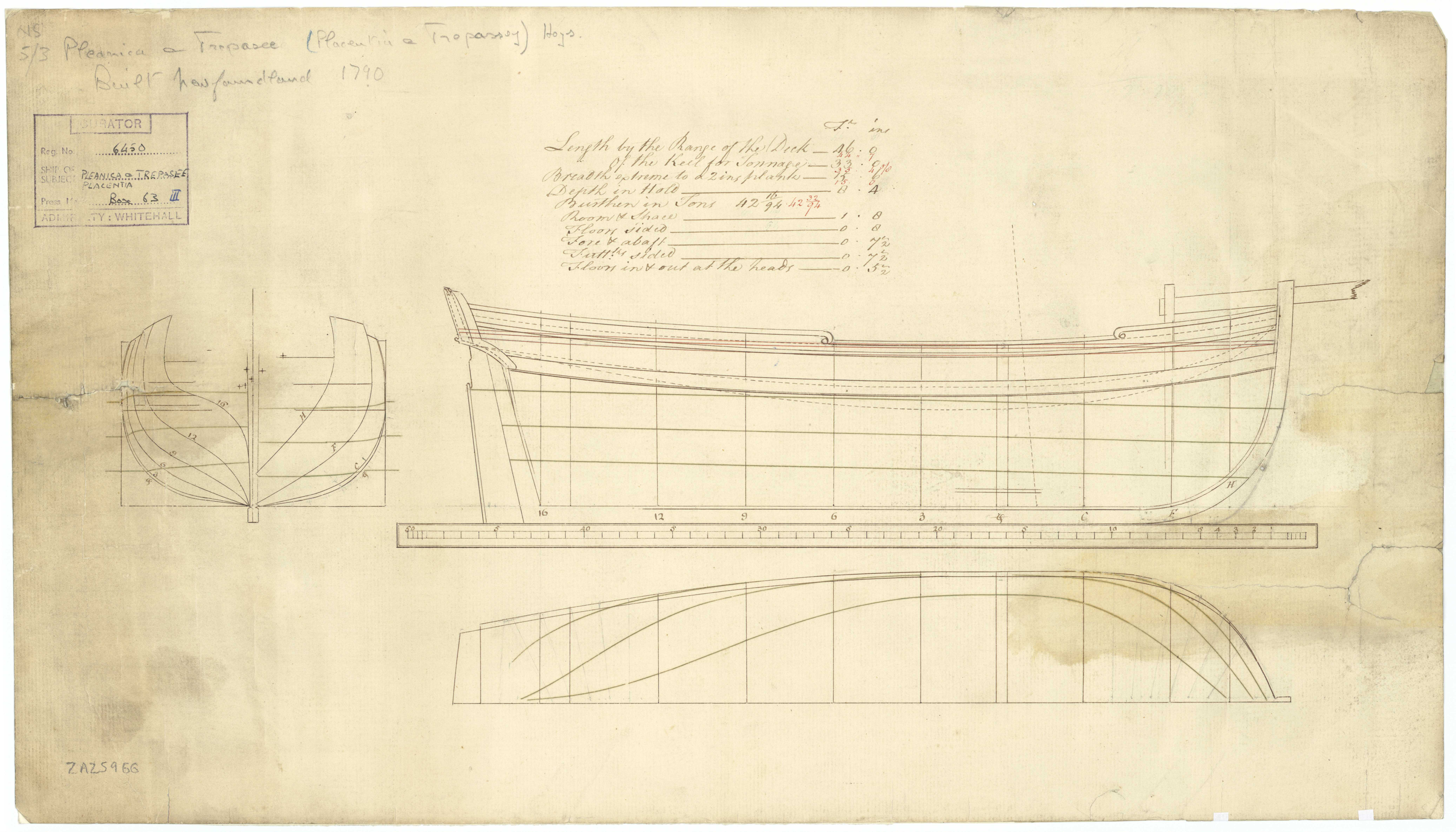
- Trepassey

History

Great Britain
- Name: HMS Trepassey
- Ordered: May 1789
- Builder: Lester & Stone, Newfoundland
- Launched: 1789
- Fate: Last listed in 1807

General characteristics
- Class & type: Placentia-class sloop
- Tons burthen: 4233/94 (bm)
- Length: 44 ft 7 in (13.6 m) (overall); 35 ft 4 5/8 in (10.8 m) (keel)
- Beam: 15 ft 0 in (4.6 m)
- Depth of hold: 8 ft 4 in (2.5 m)
- Propulsion: Sails
- Sail plan: Sloop
- Complement: 30
- Armament: 4 x ½-pounder swivel guns

HMS Trepassey (or Trepassy) was the second vessel of her two vessel class, with both vessels being launched in 1789. John Henslow designed the small sloops for coastal patrol duties off Newfoundland, "to protect the fisheries and inquiring into abuses." In 1793, after the outbreak of the French Revolutionary Wars, she accepted the surrender of Miquelon. This appears to have been the highpoint of her career. She disappears from the records in 1807.

== Career ==
The Naval Chronicle in its list of vessels added, incorrectly gives her accession year as 1790, and describes her as a storeship. She was commissioned under Lieutenant Charles Rowley. He was succeeded in 1790 by Lieutenant Gilbert, who was succeeded in 1791 by Lieutenant Home. At the time the Admiral of the station and the Admiralty rotated promising lieutenants through command of Trepassey and her sister ship, Placentia, on an annual basis.

In 1792 Lieutenant Jahleel Brenton assumed command. In March 1793 Brenton and Lieutenant Tucker, commander of Placentia were at St. John's, Newfoundland when they received a letter from the governor of Saint Pierre and Miquelon inquiring about what news there was about the possible outbreak of war. Sensing that the governor would be willing to capitulate, Brenton set out to inquire further, while Tucker tried to assemble troops. When Brenton arrived at Saint Pierre on 16 May, he discovered that Alligator had arrived the day before from Halifax, Nova Scotia, together with the armed schooner Diligent, three transports and a number of troops. The governor of the island, M. Danseville, had surrendered without a fight and the island was under British control. Trepassey was then dispatched to take possession of Miquelon. In all, the British captured a battery consisting of eight 24-pounder guns, the garrison, of between 80 and 100 men, besides about 500 armed fishermen, and the whole population of the two islands, amounting to 741 people on Saint Pierre and 761 on Miquelon. The British also seized 20 vessels that were in the harbour: 18 small vessels laden with fish, and two American schooners containing provisions and naval stores.

Richard Kevern was promoted to lieutenant on 24 October 1793 and replaced Brenton in command of Trepassey. In May 1796, Lieutenant John Hampstead took command. Trepassey was rated an armed sloop, and sailed to Plymouth for refitting. She was there from 25 December 1796 to 1 June 1798.

Lieutenant Jasper Scrambler took command of Trepassey in 1800 in Newfoundland. On 13 May, pursuant to orders, he visited Cape Sable Island to determine if he could the fate of the Francis. From meetings with various vessels and witnesses in the area, he determined that she had been lost, together with all her passengers and crew. Scrambler recommissioned Trepassey at Newfoundland by in September 1801.

Lieutenant John Gardner McBride McKillop took command in January 1803, and Lieutenant John Drew in December 1803. Lloyd's List reported that on 25 February 1806 Trepassey, Morris, master, was one of four vessels that had run ashore in the Clyde, but without damage. Her last commander appears to have been Lieutenant John Harrison Buddle, who commanded from 1806 to 1807.

== Fate ==
Trepassey's fate is unknown. Although there are reports that she was sold in 1803, there are records of later commanders, ending in 1807.
