= Loyalist (1793 ship) =

History

Great Britain
- Name: Loyalist
- Owner: Curling & Co., London
- Builder: Temple, South Shields
- Launched: 1793
- Fate: Condemned 1809

General characteristics
- Tons burthen: 526, or 534 (bm)
- Complement: 40
- Armament: 1798:14 × 6-pounder guns; 1800:20 × 6&12-pounder guns; 1809:16 × 6-pounder + 4 × 9-pounder guns

Loyalist was launched in 1793. Between 1796 and 1803 she made four voyages for the British East India Company (EIC). She then sailed as a West Indiaman until she was condemned in 1809 as unseaworthy.

== Career ==
Although Loyalist was launched in 1793, she first appeared in Lloyd's Register (LR) in 1796 with F. Walton, master, R. Curling, owner, and trade London–India.

Although one source states that Loyalist was a West Indiaman prior to sailing on her four voyages for the EIC, there is another possibility, and that is that she was a Government transport. Among the EIC vessels serving as transports in the British expedition to the Dutch Cape Colony in 1795 that culminated in the Capitulation of Saldanha Bay was a vessel referred to as the "Hospitalship Loyalist" She and several East Indiamen arrived at St. Salvadore on 7 July and left on 15 July. The hospital ship Loyalist arrived at Table Bay on 5 October, having been at Simon's Bay. On 12 November she sailed for Holland as a cartel with the former governor of the colony, Commisary Sluysken, and 200 prisoners of war.

1st EIC voyage (1996–1997): Captain Francis Walton sailed from The Downs on 16 July 1796 bound for Bengal on a voyage for the EIC. She arrived at Kedgeree on 28 February 1797. Homeward bound she was at Simon's Bay on 11 August, reached Saint Helena on 11 September, and arrived back at The Downs on 14 December.

2nd EIC voyage (1798–1800): Loyalist then made a second voyage for the EIC, this time to Bombay. She left on 11 April 1798, and arrived back at her moorings on 23 January 1800. On her way she rescued the crew of Thetis, Robson, master, which had foundered on her way from Bombay to London.

3rd EIC voyage (1800–1802): Captain Walton acquired a letter of marque on 2 June 1800. Loyalist was one of 28 vessels that left England between December 1800 and February 1801 to bring back rice from Bengal. The EIC had a monopoly on such trade and the vessels either belonged to it or sailed under charter to it. Prinsep & Saunders alone tendered 15 vessels, including Loyalist, Francis Walton, master.

Apparently Loyalist actually sailed on 27 July 1800 via Saint Helena. She returned on 26 January 1802.

4th EIC voyage (1802–1803): Loyalist sailed in 1802 to Batavia on a fourth voyage for the EIC. Lloyd's List reported on 27 September 1803 that Loyalist, Walton, master, had been sailing from Batavia to Amsterdam when Rosalind, of Liverpool, Brown, master, captured her and sent her into Bantry Bay. War with France and the Batavian Republic had resumed in 1803 while Lloyalist had been underway and so she had been sailing from one enemy port to another. Still, Loyalist returned to her moorings on 16 October 1803.

Loyalist returned to the West Indies trade.

Year	Master	Owner	Trade	Source
1804	F. Walton	Liddell & Co. Curling & Co.	London–Batavia; London–Jamaica	Lloyd's Register
1809	Seabright	R. Curling	London–Antigua	Register of Shipping
1810	Norwol	Curling & Co.	London–Jamaica	Lloyd's Register

== Fate ==
Lloyd's List reported on 9 June 1809 that Loyalist, Norwall, master, had put back to Jamaica leaky on 18 April after having sailed for London. Then on 7 July Lloyd's List reported that Loyalist, Sicvennight, master, from Jamaica to London, had been condemned and her cargo unloaded. The entry for Loyalist in the Register of Shipping for 1809 has the annotation "condemned" by her name.
