= HMS Diligent (1790) =

Small Royal Navy schooner

History

Great Britain
- Name: HMS Diligent
- Acquired: 1790 by purchase
- Decommissioned: 1795
- Fate: Harbour duties 1795; ultimate disposal currently unknown

General characteristics
- Type: Schooner
- Tons burthen: 89 (bm)
- Complement: 20
- Armament: 4 × 3-pounder guns

HMS Diligent (or Diligente, or Diligence), was a small mercantile schooner that the Royal Navy purchased locally in 1790 for the Nova Scotia station. She helped capture Saint Pierre in 1793 and was sold in 1794. She then served on harbour duties at Halifax, carrying water and stores to the naval squadron stationed there.

== Career ==
In 1790, Rear Admiral Sir Richard Hughes received permission to buy three light-draft schooners that could sail in shoal waters where the Navy's regular vessels could not go and so assist in the suppression of smuggling. The three were Diligent, Chatham, and Alert. Alert was wrecked in 1791, but Hughes then sent Diligent and Chatham to New York in alternate months to get the mail and dispatches, which were being routed through there and otherwise might sit there for several months. The experiment was beset by difficulties but by 1793 the service apparently was working.

In April Alligator, under the command of Captain William Afleck, stopped at Halifax on her way to the Leeward Islands. War with France having broken out, the authorities decided to capture St Pierre and Miquelon. Alligator and Diligence sailed, with three transports carrying troops under the command of Brigadier General James Ogilvie on 7 May. The expeditionary force captured Saint Pierre on 14 May; they also captured 18 small vessels carrying fish, and two American schooners with provisions and naval stores. Trepassey arrived a day later and then sailed to Miquelon to complete the conquest. Prize money for the capture of the islands was paid in October 1796.

== Fate ==
The Navy sold Chatham and Diligent off in 1795. After they had sat idle for some time, the Navy sold Chatham and converted Diligent to harbour duties.
