= Jahleel Brenton =

Royal Navy officer (1770–1844)

Vice-Admiral Sir Jahleel Brenton Bt KCB
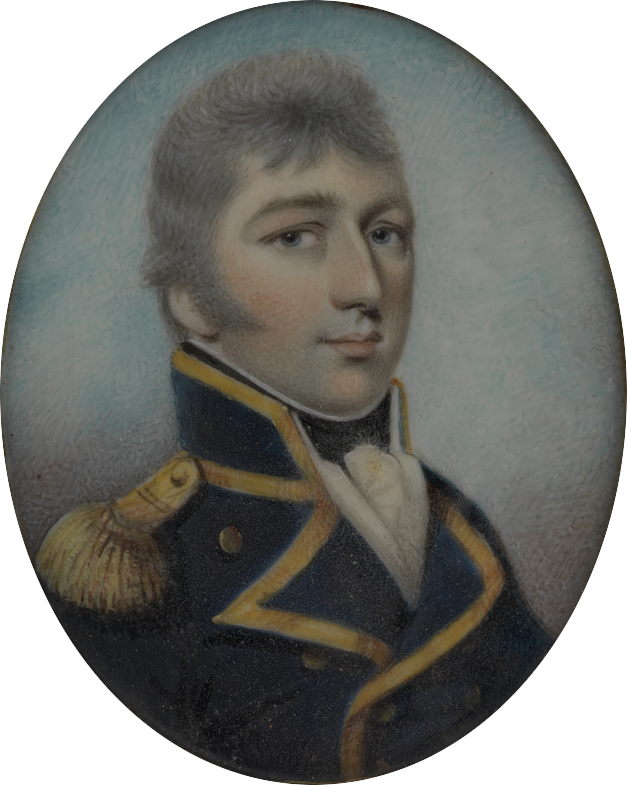
- Jahleel Brenton, c. 1802
- Born: 22 August 1770; Colony of Rhode Island and Providence Plantations, British America
- Died: 21 April 1844; Leamington Spa, Warwickshire
- Military career
- Allegiance: Great Britain; United Kingdom
- Branch: Royal Navy
- Service years: 1781–1830
- Rank: Vice-Admiral
- Commands: HMS Trepassey; HMS Speedy; HMS Généreux; HMS Caesar; HMS Minerve; HMS Spartan; HMS Stirling Castle; HMY Dorset; HMS Royal Sovereign; HMS Donegal
- Conflicts: American Revolutionary War; Russo-Swedish War; Battle of Svensksund; French Revolutionary Wars; Battle of Cape St Vincent; First Battle of Algeciras; Second Battle of Algeciras; Napoleonic Wars; Action of 3 May 1810 (WIA)
- Awards: Order of Saint Ferdinand and of Merit (Sicily)

Vice-Admiral Sir Jahleel Brenton, 1st Baronet, KCB (22 August 1770 – 21 April 1844) was a Royal Navy officer who served in the French Revolutionary and Napoleonic Wars.

Brenton was born in British America but his family relocated to England after the outbreak of the American War of Independence. He followed his father into the Royal Navy, enrolling as a midshipman and reached the rank of lieutenant in 1790. After accepting a commission to serve in the Royal Swedish Navy during the Russo-Swedish War, Brenton returned to the Royal Navy and was given his first command, HMS Trepassey, in 1791. Serving in the Mediterranean during the French Revolutionary Wars, Brenton took part in the Battle of Cape St Vincent on HMS Barfleur and earned the patronage of Admiral Sir John Jervis. He was subsequently appointed commander of HMS Speedy in which he distinguished himself in a number actions against Spanish ships. He was promoted to post-captain in 1800 and served as flag captain on HMS Caesar under Rear Admiral Sir James Saumarez, taking part in the First and Second Battles of Algeciras.

At the outbreak of the Napoleonic Wars, Brenton was given command of the frigate HMS Minerve but he was taken prisoner soon afterwards when his ship ran aground near Cherbourg. He spent three and a half years in captivity in France before he was exchanged for a French prisoner of war and was subsequently given command of HMS Spartan. Brenton returned to the Mediterranean in 1807 where he launched a disastrous attack on an armed polacre which earned a strong rebuke from Vice Admiral Lord Collingwood. He salvaged his reputation undertaking a series of notable exploits while commanding a squadron of frigates in the Adriatic, and assisted with the capture several French Ionian Islands. In May 1810, he fought a successful action against a Neapolitan squadron near Naples in which he was severely wounded by enemy grapeshot. Brenton was rewarded with a baronetcy and a knighthood but his wound troubled him for the rest of his life.

In 1814 he was appointed commissioner of Port Mahon Dockyard and the following year he became naval commissioner at the Cape of Good Hope. He became Lieutenant-Governor of Greenwich Hospital in 1831 and eventually rose to the rank of vice admiral. A pious man, Brenton became involved in philanthropic activities in later life and he died in 1844, aged 73.

== Early life ==
Jahleel Brenton was born on 22 August 1770 in Rhode Island, British North America. He was the eldest of ten children born to Rear Admiral Jahleel Brenton of the Royal Navy and his wife Henrietta Cowley. Brenton was the great-great grandson of the Colony of Rhode Island and Providence Plantations governor William Brenton, who had emigrated from England in the 17th century, and the grandson of the longest serving governor in Rhode Island history, Samuel Cranston. He had two brothers that survived past infancy—Edward Pelham Brenton and James Wallace Brenton—and both served in the Royal Navy.

At the outbreak of the American War of Independence, Brenton's father—at that time a lieutenant—remained loyal to the British and the Brenton family was forced to flee Rhode Island for England in 1780. Brenton briefly attended a school in Enfield, Middlesex and in 1781, aged 11, he enrolled as a midshipman in the Royal Navy under his father who had been assigned to command the hired armed ship Queen. His father was promoted to post-captain later that year and Brenton followed him to his new command, the 26-gun sixth rate HMS Termagant, until May 1782 when the ship was taken out of service for a refit. Following the Peace of Paris in 1783, Brenton resumed his studies in England at a maritime school in Chelsea, London. In 1785 he moved with his family to Saint-Omer, France, and became adept in the French language. Brenton developed a talent for painting and his parents considered sending him to Italy to develop his skills before he made the decision to persevere with a naval career.

== Early naval career ==
Brenton returned to England with his family in 1787 and he was appointed to the 36-gun frigate HMS Perseverance under the command of Captain William Young, a friend of his father. However, less than two months later the ship was decommissioned for an extensive refit. He subsequently joined HMS Dido in which he was employed in surveying and sounding the coast of Nova Scotia. Returning to England in 1789, Brenton joined HMS Bellona which was refitting in Portsmouth and in March 1790 he passed an examination for the rank of lieutenant.

Seeking active employment, Brenton and a number of other Royal Navy officers accepted commissions to serve in the Royal Swedish Navy which was engaged in operations against Russia in the Russo-Swedish War. Although Brenton arrived too late to take part in the Swedish navy's break-out at the Battle of Vyborg Bay in July 1790, he was present at the Swede's decisive victory at the Battle of Svensksund five days later. Peace was declared soon afterwards and although King Gustav offered his British officers continued employment, Brenton returned to England as mounting tensions between Spain and Britain had increased the likelihood of an imminent declaration of war.

Resuming service with the Royal Navy, Brenton was appointed second lieutenant of HMS Assurance, a troop ship destined for Halifax, Nova Scotia, which Brenton described as "a station of all others I would have chosen, having numerous friends and relations at that place". However, having been sent ashore at Rochester in search of a group of deserters, Brenton and four midshipmen were arrested, accused by the mayor of illegally "impressing within the limits of the city". Attacked by an angry mob while being transferred to prison, Brenton later recalled being "knocked down, dragged through the street and narrowly escap[ing] with life, losing nearly all my clothes." Brenton was released after the Admiralty intervened on his behalf but Assurance had sailed without him and he was transferred to the 14-gun brig HMS Speedy which was patrolling for smugglers off the English coast.

== French Revolutionary Wars ==
Speedy was paid off in 1791 and Brenton spent nearly a year ashore on half-pay before he was appointed to command HMS Trepassey, a small 44-foot (13 m) long sloop armed with four swivel guns that was used to patrol the coast of Newfoundland. Brenton remained at that station for two years and at the outbreak of war with France in 1793 he was involved in the capture of the French settlements at Saint Pierre and Miquelon which capitulated without resistance. Brenton was subsequently recalled to England, where he arrived in January 1794, and was appointed second lieutenant on the frigate HMS Sibyl. Sibyl was dispatched as part of a squadron headed for the Scheldt later that year before embarking on an arduous cruise off the Dutch coast throughout the winter of 1794, during which time Brenton was promoted to first lieutenant. In February 1795, Sibyl proceeded to the River Weser to assist with the evacuation of British troops retreating from the disastrous Flanders Campaign.

=== Mediterranean Fleet ===
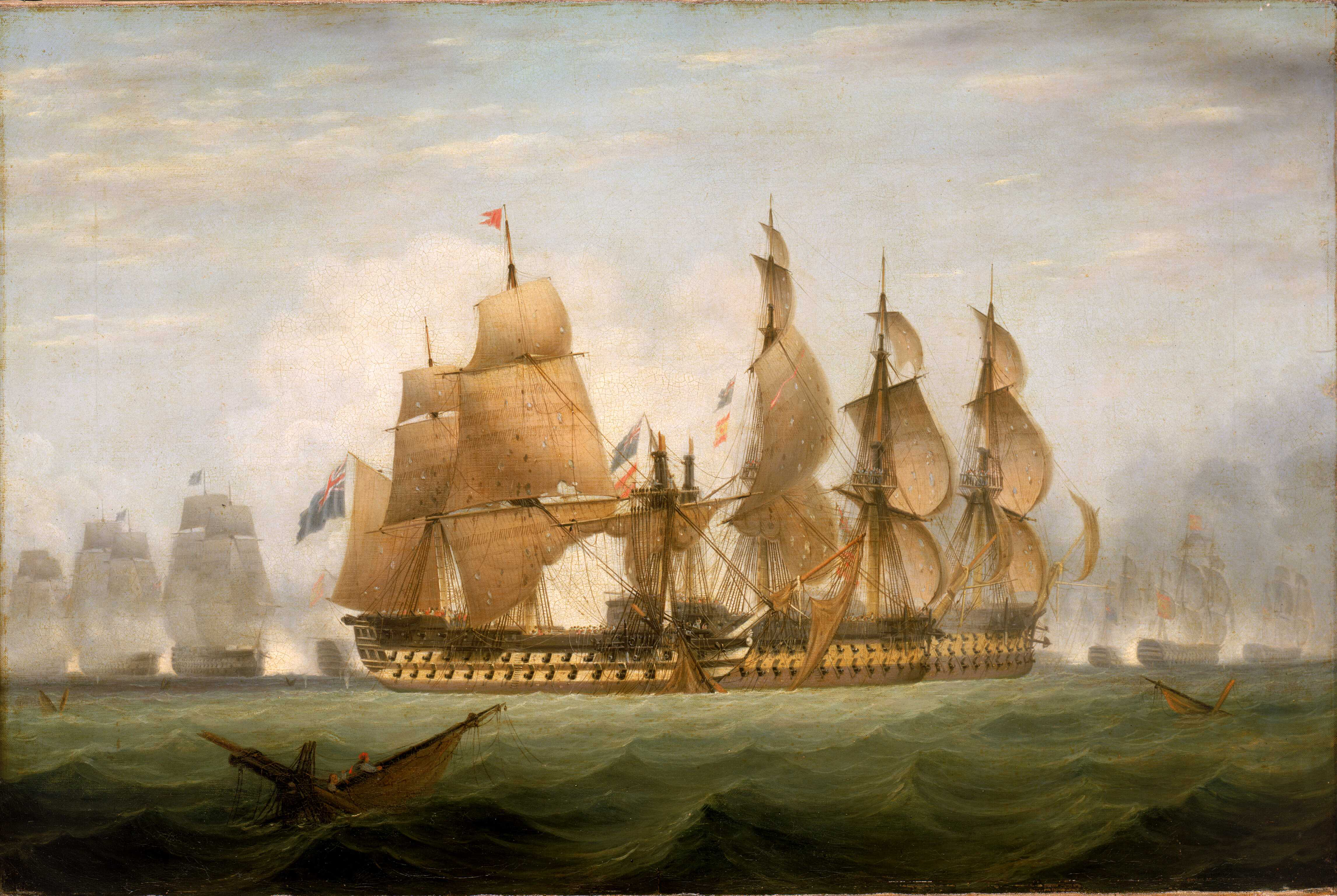
The Battle of Cape St Vincent, 14 February 1797

Ill-health forced Brenton to relinquish his position on Sibyl and return ashore at the end of 1795. After a short period of convalescence, Brenton wrote to Admiralty requesting a return to active service. However, he was dismayed to learn that he had been appointed second lieutenant on a store ship, HMS Alliance, a position he described as "disgraceful and degrading to an officer, who had been for some time first lieutenant of a frigate". His protests were dismissed by the Admiralty and in March 1796, Alliance set sail with a large convoy headed for the Mediterranean. Arriving off Corsica later that year, Brenton wrote to the Commander-in-Chief of the Mediterranean Fleet, Admiral Sir John Jervis, to appeal for a more favourable appointment. Jervis was sympathetic with Brenton's plight and installed him as first lieutenant on the 80-gun third-rate HMS Gibraltar which was part of a squadron undertaking a close blockade of Toulon during the summer of 1796.

In September 1796, Spain's entry into the war as an ally of France prompted the British fleet to abandon the Mediterranean, where it was in danger of becoming seriously outnumbered, and retreat to Gibraltar. While at anchor off Rosia Bay on 10 December, Gibraltar was caught in a storm that drove her on to rocks on the western shore of the Bay of Gibraltar before she was blown across to safety in the Strait of Gibraltar. The ship was sent back to England for extensive repairs to her hull and Jervis gave Brenton a temporary position in Vice Admiral William Waldegrave's flagship HMS Barfleur.

On 14 February 1797, Barfleur was part of Jervis's fleet that intercepted a larger Spanish fleet at the Battle of Cape St Vincent off the southern coast of Portugal. The British achieved a morale boosting victory that enabled them to return to the Mediterranean and confine the Spanish fleet to Cádiz until the end of the war. Jervis held Brenton in high regard and in August 1797 he transferred him to his flagship HMS Ville de Paris. The British fleet commenced a close blockade of Cádiz and in Spring 1798 Brenton's actions while commanding a detachment of boats under attack from Spanish gunboats earned enthusiastic praise from Jervis. As a consequence he was made commander of HMS Speedy in September 1798, a sloop that he had previously served in and remembered with fondness.

=== HMS Speedy ===
Brenton's command of Speedy offered him several opportunities to distinguish himself. In February 1799 Speedy was escorting a convoy of supply ships that were ambushed by 23 Spanish gunboats in the Bay of Gibraltar. He gave orders for the convoy close up and make all sail for Gibraltar while he brought Speedy between the convoy and the enemy ships whereupon she was set upon by the entire Spanish flotilla. After ensuring the convoy had reached safety, Brenton broke off and joined them under the gun batteries of Gibraltar. He subsequently received the congratulations of Jervis—now titled Earl St Vincent—and the Governor of Gibraltar.

Speedy was sailing off Gibraltar again on 9 August with the British privateer Defender when they spotted three armed Spanish xebecs. When Speedy gave chase, the Spanish ships ran for a small sandy bay where they moored in a single line bow to stern. Finding that no progress had been made after engaging the Spanish ships for over two hours while under sail, Brenton anchored Speedy within pistol shot of the central Spanish vessel and exchanged a cannonade for three-quarters of an hour, inducing the Spanish to abandon their ships and make for the shore. Speedy had suffered two wounded; the Spanish ships were taken as prizes and brought to Gibraltar.

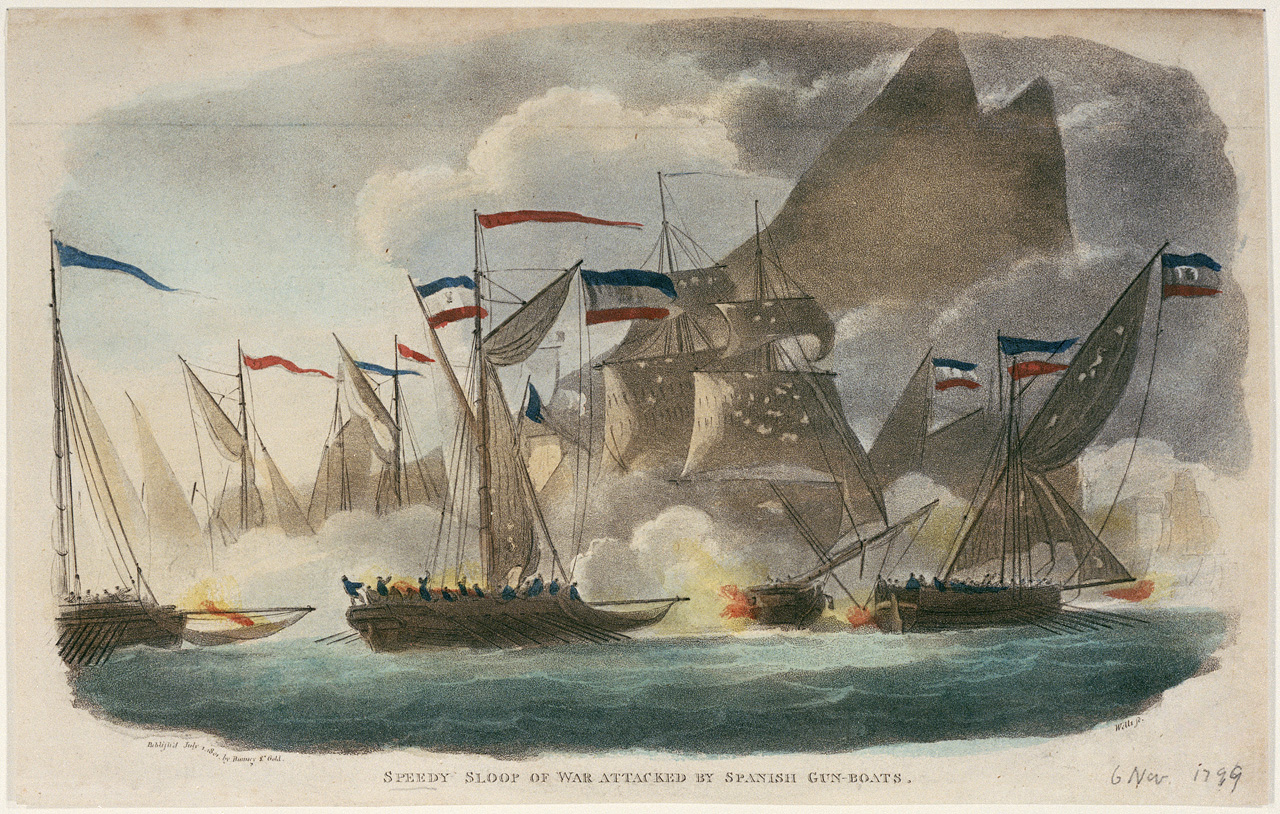
HMS Speedy (centre) surrounded by Spanish gunboats off Gibraltar in November 1799

On 6 November Speedy was standing off Europa Point while escorting a merchant vessel and a transport ship laden with wine for the British fleet when twelve Spanish gun boats raced out from Algeciras to launch an opportunistic attack. Although greatly outgunned, Brenton bore down on the enemy ships and opened fire, enabling the merchant ship to escape to safety. The gunboats then concentrated their efforts on capturing the transport ship. Brenton took Speedy amidst the flotilla, close enough to break several oars, while firing broadsides from both sides of the ship and maintaining a brisk musketry for around 45 minutes. The Spanish consequently broke off their attack and ran for the Spanish coast. Meanwhile, Speedy, which suffered two dead, one wounded and extensive damage to her rigging and hull, was unable to pursue and limped to the Moroccan coast off Tétouan to make hasty repairs. Arriving back in Gibraltar the following day, Brenton received widespread praise for his conduct: the Governor of Gibraltar, General Charles O'Hara, urged the Admiralty to award Brenton a promotion and Rear Admiral Horatio Nelson praised Brenton's "uncommon skill and gallantry". Just days after his triumph, however, Brenton received news his brother, Lieutenant James Wallace Brenton of HMS Peterel, had been severely wounded during an action with a Spanish privateer. Brenton was given permission to take Speedy to Port Mahon where his brother was undergoing treatment but upon arrival discovered he had died from his injuries.

Brenton's promotion to post captain was confirmed on 25 April 1800 by Vice Admiral Lord Keith, who had superseded St Vincent as commander-in-chief of the fleet. Command of Speedy was subsequently handed over to Lord Cochrane and Brenton was given a temporary position as captain of HMS Genereux, a 74-gun ship of the line that had been captured from the French in February, pending the availability of a suitable ship to command. Brenton found Genereux undergoing extensive repairs at Port Mahon and in May she joined the British squadron blockading Genoa. Superseded by Captain Manley Dixon in June, Brenton departed Genereux for Gibraltar but finding no other ship was available for him to command he was ordered to return to England.

=== HMS Caesar ===
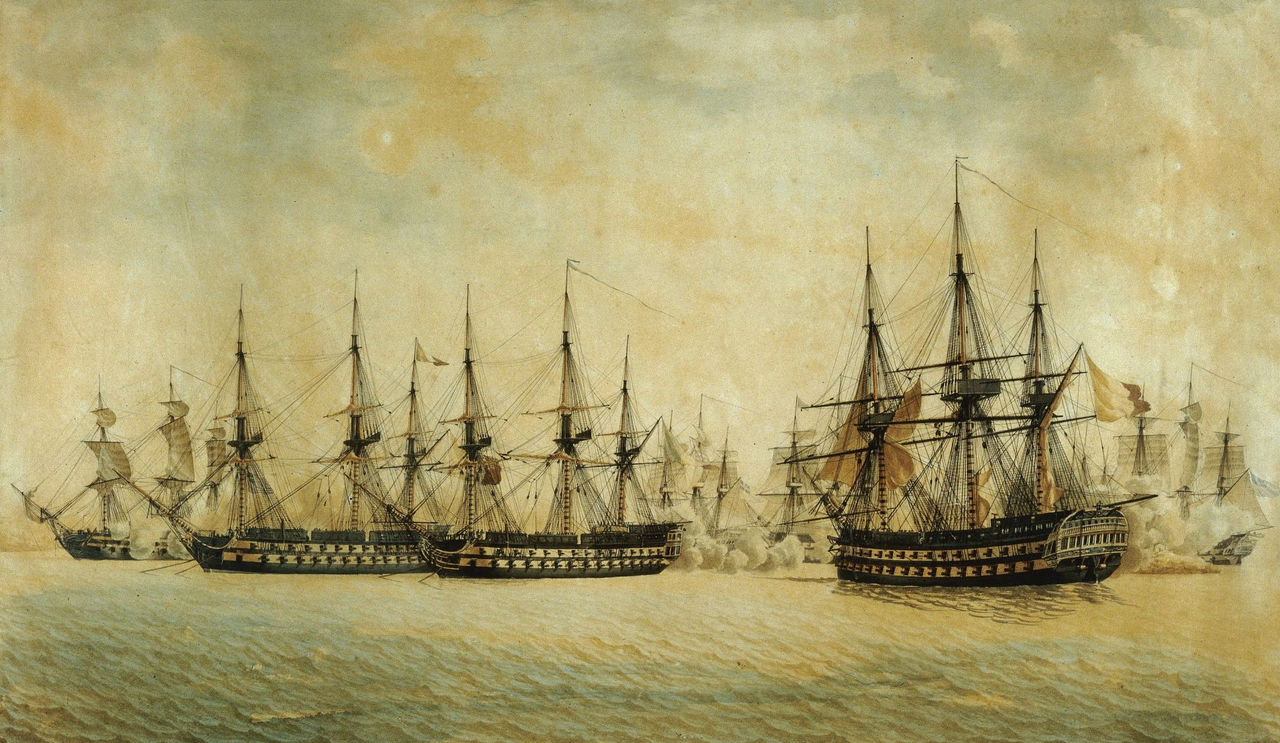
The Battle of Algeciras, 1801, Antoine Roux

En route to England, Brenton paid a visit to Earl St Vincent, now commander in chief of the Channel Fleet, cruising off Brest. Benefiting from the Admiral's patronage, Brenton was given a position as volunteer on St Vincent's flagship HMS Ville de Paris and in January 1801, he was appointed flag captain of Rear Admiral Sir James Samuarez's flagship HMS Caesar. Caesar departed the Channel Fleet in May when Samuarez was ordered to lead a squadron down to Cádiz to watch the movements of the Spanish fleet. After receiving news that a French squadron of three ships of the line and one frigate had arrived at Algeciras intending to link up with the Spanish fleet at Cádiz, Samuarez sailed directly for the anchorage with his six ships of the line and launched an attack on 6 July. Although the numerically superior British inflicted severe damage to the French ships, light winds hampered Samuarez's squadron which withdrew to Gibraltar after suffering heavy casualties and the loss of HMS Hannibal. Caesar, which had been in the thick of the action, was heavily damaged and had 16 killed and 25 wounded. In his dispatches to the Admiralty in the aftermath of the battle, Samuarez praised Brenton's "cool judgement and intrepid conduct".

The following day, Brenton was sent to Algeciras under a flag of truce and negotiated the release of Hannibal's officers on parole. He returned to Gibraltar to find Samuarez preparing to transfer to HMS Audacious: eager to attack the French before they reached the safety of Cádiz, he deemed Caesar too damaged to take part in any further operations. However, Brenton was confident he could make the ship seaworthy and requested permission to continue repairs. Just fours days later his crew had completed extensive repairs to her hull and foremast, and her shattered mainmast had been entirely replaced. On 12 July the French squadron, which had been reinforced by six Spanish ships of the line, departed Algeciras and Samuarez's squadron set off in pursuit. The British subsequently earned a notable victory at the Second Battle of Algeciras but Caesar did not play a significant part in the battle.

== Peacetime ==
After peace was declared in March 1802, Brenton obtained permission to return to England where he married Isabella Stewart, with whom he had two sons and a daughter. Stewart was born to a Loyalist family from Maryland that had been exiled to Nova Scotia where she first met Brenton when he was a midshipman on HMS Dido. Brenton had waited until he reached post captain rank before proposing and his arrival in England was the first time they had seen each other in thirteen years. Escalating tensions with France in 1803 prompted Brenton to apply for a command and in March he was appointed captain of the frigate HMS Minerve. However, soon after arriving on the ship he was struck on the head by a falling block and severely concussed. Unable to resume command, he returned to his home in Bath to recover while another captain was given temporary command of Minerve.

== Napoleonic Wars ==
=== Captivity ===
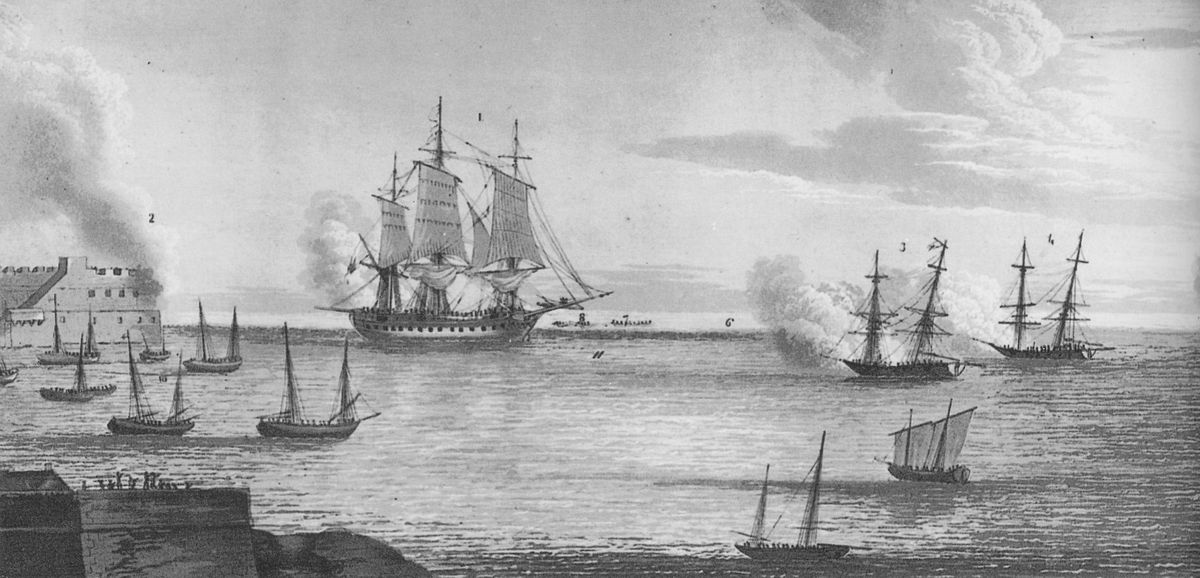
HMS Minerve under attack in Cherbourg

Although not fully recovered from his injury, Brenton was anxious to resume command and returned to Minerve in June 1802. War had been declared against France and Brenton was given orders to join Samuarez's Channel Island squadron. On the night of 2 July Brenton sailed inshore to reconnoitre Cherbourg Harbour when he and his pilot became disorientated in thick fog and Minerve ran aground on a submerged breakwater under construction in the port. The fog soon cleared and Minerve immediately came under heavy fire from shore batteries while two French gun brigs moved to position themselves off Minerve's bow where they could direct a raking fire. Brenton responded by dispatching the ships boats inshore to capture a vessel large enough to carry one of the Minerve's bower anchors to a distance suitable for warping. Meanwhile, the frigate's launch was sent to distract the gun brigs. The boats returned with a lugger which took the anchor on board, but a lack of wind prevented Minerve from making any headway. At dawn on 3 July, as Brenton contemplated scuttling the ship, a fresh wind enabled Minerve to refloat but hopes of an escape were dashed soon after when the wind ceased completely and the ship drifted on to another breakwater. Unable to bring his guns to bear on the enemy and facing a destructive barrage of fire which had sunk the lugger, Brenton consequently surrendered his ship after suffering eleven men killed and sixteen wounded.

Prisoner exchanges had become increasingly rare and Brenton faced a lengthy period of captivity. Days after their capture Brenton and his crew were marched 500 miles (800 km) inland through France to Epinal and in November, Brenton was given parole and relocated to the prisoner of war depot at Verdun. During this period Brenton began to "consider more attentively the nature of the religion I professed" and developed strong evangelical beliefs. He organised regular church services, assisted with the establishment of schools teaching literacy and seamanship, and took a leading role in improving the welfare of the common sailors who were separated from the officers and distributed among various depots across north east France. In April 1805 he obtained permission for his wife and their two-year-old son to join him in France. They relocated to lodgings in Charny-sur-Meuse but Brenton began to suffer from poor health and bouts of anxiety and depression. Brenton and his family were granted permission to move to the "milder climate" of Tours to aid his recovery and found his health greatly improved: Brenton later described his time there as the "happiest part of my life". In December 1806, after three and a half years in captivity, Brenton was exchanged for Captain Louis-Antoine-Cyprien Infernet—nephew of Marshal André Masséna—who had been captured at the Battle of Trafalgar.

=== HMS Spartan ===
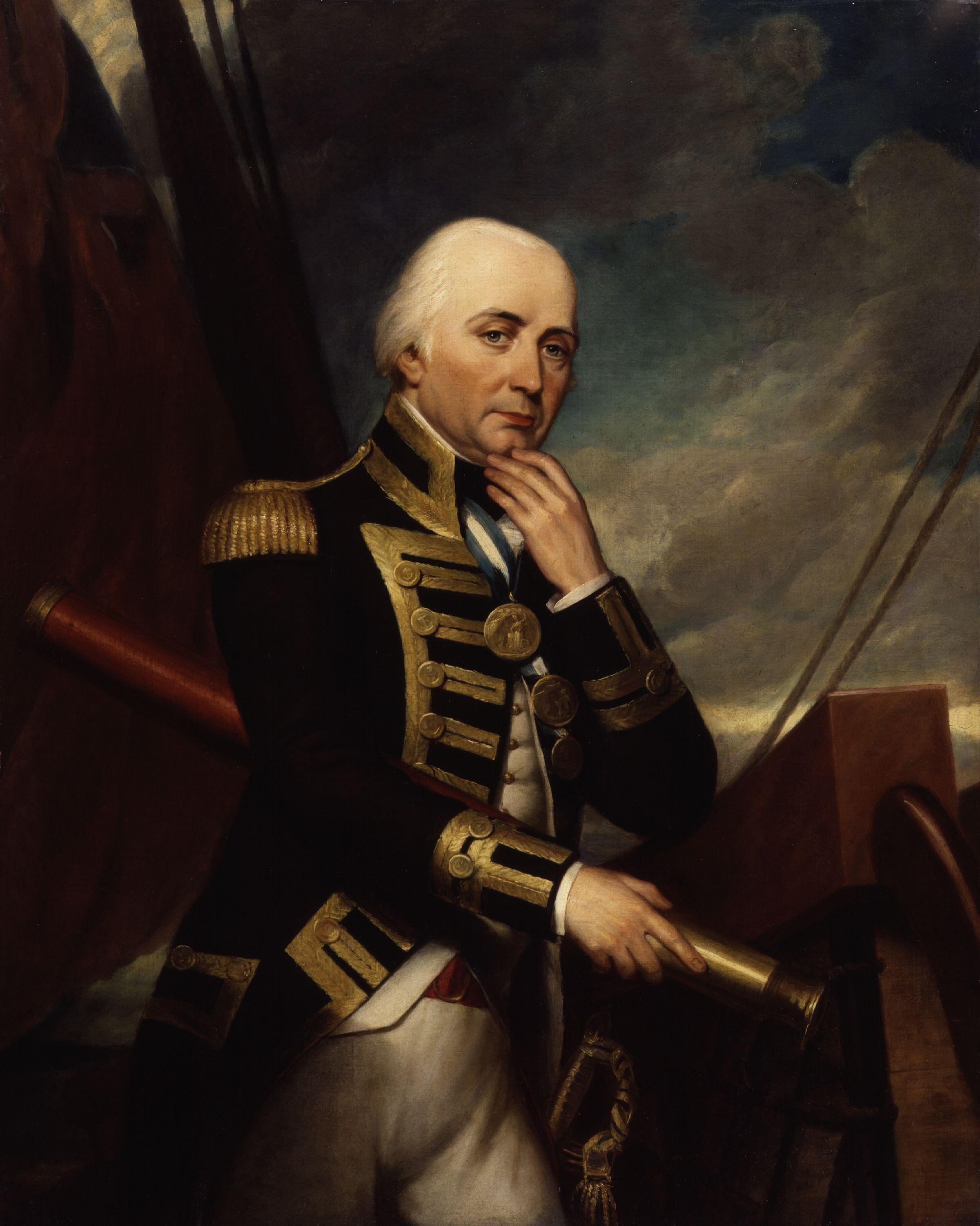
Vice Admiral Lord Collingwood

After arriving back in England, Brenton was duly court-martialled for the loss of Minerve but was exonerated and given command of the newly constructed 36-gun frigate HMS Spartan in February 1807. Spartan was dispatched to the Mediterranean where Brenton was given orders to cruise off Toulon to watch the movements of the French fleet. Arriving off Elba on 27 April, Brenton narrowly avoided capture a second time when he encountered a French squadron of four ships that immediately gave chase. As the leading French frigate bore down on Spartan, it opened fire but was subsequently becalmed and surrounded by a thick shroud of smoke from its cannonade that enabled Spartan to escape.

On 14 May, Brenton experienced what he described as "a disaster, which, in my estimation, far exceeded in severity any that had ever befallen me in the whole course of my professional career" while chasing a suspected enemy polacre off Nice. Both ships became becalmed therefore Brenton sent the frigate's boats loaded with 70 of his crew to row ahead and capture what he believed was an unarmed merchant vessel. However the polacre was heavily armed and her guns wreaked havoc on Spartan's crew as they attempted to board, forcing the boats to retreat with heavy casualties. Sixty-three men were killed or wounded; among the dead were Brenton's first and second lieutenants. A court of enquiry was held to investigate the disastrous attack on the polacre but the court cleared Brenton of any blame, accepting Brenton's explanation that his zealous first lieutenant had failed to adhere to instructions to turn back if the polacre was armed. However, shortly afterwards Brenton was summoned to a meeting with the commander in chief, Vice Admiral Lord Collingwood, who rebuked Brenton and expressed his dissatisfaction at the outcome of the enquiry. Collingwood ordered him to return to his station off Toulon where the mundane task of watching over the port would offer little opportunity for Brenton to cause further nuisance.

Brenton was given a brief respite from his position off Toulon in March 1808 when Spartan was ordered to cruise between Sardinia and Cape Bon. Soon after arriving, Brenton encountered a powerful French squadron of ten ships of the line and four frigates and gave pursuit to determine their destination before losing sight of them during the night four days later. His efforts were not entirely in vain, however, as his determination to shadow the squadron despite considerable risk of capture earned praise from his former critic, Collingwood. Later that year, Brenton was ordered to make sail for the Gulf of Roses where he joined Lord Cochrane's frigate HMS Imperieuse on 7 September. Over the following week they launched successful amphibious operations against the French, destroying a string of signal posts, telegraphs and shore batteries along the coast and capturing six merchant vessels. At the end of 1808, Collingwood removed Spartan from her station off Toulon and in February 1809 'Spartan was dispatched on a cruise in the eastern Mediterranean, capturing an enemy merchant vessel off the Libyan coast. Upon returning to Malta in April Brenton was given command of a squadron of frigates in the Adriatic and embarked on a highly active period over the following year.

==== Adriatic and Ionian Islands ====
Receiving the temporary rank of commodore, Brenton entered the Adriatic with Captain William Hoste's HMS Amphion and HMS Mercury commanded by Captain Henry Duncan, and attacked the port at Pesaro in April, capturing 13 merchant vessels before blowing up a castle at the harbour entrance. The following month, Spartan and Mercury entered the port of Cesenatico, destroyed the shore batteries and cut out twelve merchant vessel and burnt another. Shortly afterwards, Brenton was dispatched to the coast of Croatia to assist with the Austrian offensive against the French garrison on the island of Lošinj. After embarking a detachment of Austrian soldiers, Brenton launched an assault on the French defences and captured the island, suffering only three wounded.

In June Spartan returned to Malta for repairs and was subsequently attached to a squadron led by Captain John Spranger of HMS Warrior that was sent on an expedition to capture the Ionian Islands. Encountering only minimal resistance, the British squadron swiftly took the islands of Zante and Cephalonia before Spartan was dispatched with a division of infantry from the 35th Regiment of Foot to attack Cerigo. On 10 October Brenton landed on the island with his small invasion force and assaulted the castle at Kapsali the following morning. After exchanging fire throughout most of the day the enemy garrison surrendered at dawn on 12 October as Spartan's crew prepared to bring additional cannon ashore. Collingwood received news of Brenton's triumphs with enthusiasm and in a letter to Lord Mulgrave, First Lord of the Admiralty, wrote "I cannot say too much to your Lordship of the zeal and talent of Captain Brenton: of these he gives proof whenever he is employed; and he seems to be everywhere."

Early in 1810, Spartan was attached to Rear Admiral George Martin's squadron at Palermo and was given orders to cruise between Sicily and Naples. While cruising in company with the frigate HMS Success and the brig-sloop HMS Espoir on 25 April they spotted a convoy of enemy merchant vessels that made sail for the anchorage under the castle at Terracina. Brenton dispatched boarding parties to the anchorage in the boats of Spartan and Success which, supported by fire from the British ships, captured four merchant vessels laden with lead ore.

==== Action of 3 May 1810 ====
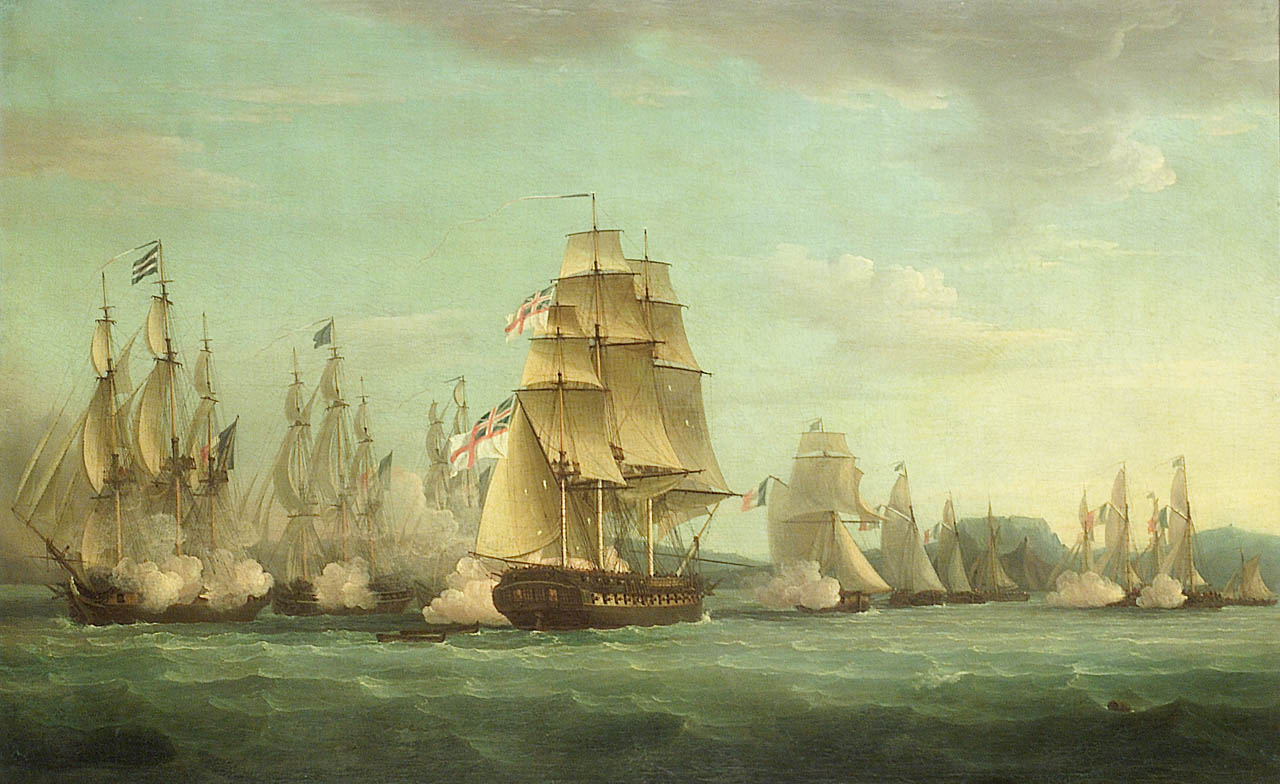
HMS Spartan and French Frigates: Beginning of the Action, Third of May 1810, Thomas Whitcombe

On 1 May, Spartan and Success entered the Gulf of Naples where they discovered a Neapolitan squadron consisting of the frigate Cerere, the corvette Fama and the armed brigs Achille and Sparviero. Brenton immediately set a course to intercept the squadron but to his dismay they escaped to the safety of the Port of Naples. The following day, believing that the Neapolitan ships would decline to leave the port unless the odds were heavily in their favour, he ordered Success to sail out of sight beyond the island of Capri. Early on 3 May, Brenton was pleased to observe the enemy squadron bearing down on his position in a line of battle. However, they had been joined by seven or eight gunboats armed with 18-pounder cannon, and Cerere and Fama had reinforced their crew with 400 Swiss infantry.

Leading the line, Cerere was the first ship to fire as she closed within pistol shot of Spartan's port bow. Spartan responded with a destructive triple-shotted broadside which caused carnage among the troops crowded on the enemy deck and exchanged fire with Fama and Sparviero as they passed in succession. Achille and the gunboats altered course to avoid the British frigate but Brenton swung Spartan round to give them her port broadside while firing her starboard guns into the larger Neapolitan ships. Instead of turning to support the gunboats, Cerere stood inshore for protection of the batteries at Baiae and Brenton set off in pursuit. However, moments later, light winds becalmed Spartan and left her surrounded by the enemy squadron and exposed to a concentrated cannonade. Brenton climbed on the capstan to gain a better view of the enemy position and was struck on the left side of his hip by grapeshot which shattered his ilium. Gravely injured, he was carried below and command of the frigate passed to Lieutenant George Wickens Willes.

A light breeze subsequently enabled Spartan to get under way and pour fire into Cerere's starboard quarter and launch a devastating raking fire into Fama's stern. Spartan then fired a broadside into Sparviero which compelled her to haul down her colours and surrender. Meanwhile, Cerere escaped to Baia—heavy damage to her rigging prevented Spartan from pursuing—and the badly damaged Fama was towed to safety by the gunboats. Spartan had suffered heavy losses with ten killed and 22 wounded while Neapolitan losses were estimated to be around 130 killed and wounded. Returning to Malta the following week, Brenton was given a hero's welcome and received news he had been awarded the Order of Saint Ferdinand and of Merit by the Ferdinand I of the Two Sicilies. Brenton was offered the command of another squadron in the Adriatic but the severity of his wound prevented him from continuing active service and in June Rear Admiral Martin arranged for Spartan to carry Brenton back to England.

== Later service ==
Confined to his cot and suffering great pain from his wound, Brenton endured an uncomfortable journey back to England and after his arrival he continued his convalescence in lodgings in Alverstoke and Paddington. In recognition of his service, Brenton was made a baronet, received a 100-guinea sword from Lloyd's Patriotic Fund, and in consequence of his wound was granted an annual pension of £300. However, in the spring of 1811, Brenton faced financial ruin when his prize agent failed with the loss of the prize money earned from Spartan. In addition to this loss, a court of appeal ordered that his seizure of two American ships sailing with false documents in 1807 was unlawful and he was ordered to repay £3,000—a decision Brenton claimed was motivated by political expediency. As a consequence Brenton was forced to sell his home in Bath and narrowly avoided being sent to debtors' prison when a friend loaned him the remaining debt.

Over the next year Brenton continued his rehabilitation under the supervision of the surgeon Henry Cline. Having gained enough strength to discard his crutches and walk with two walking sticks, Brenton applied for a return to active service. In March 1812 he was given command of the third rate HMS Stirling Castle which was at Chatham Dockyard preparing to join the Channel Fleet. However, Brenton was troubled by his wound and just six months later he reluctantly resigned his commission, explaining in his memoirs: "As the winter approached, I felt this inconvenience of being lame more sensibly, as it increased my anxiety respecting the duty of the ship, from a conviction that I could not use the same activity I had formerly possessed".

=== Port Mahon and Cape Colony ===
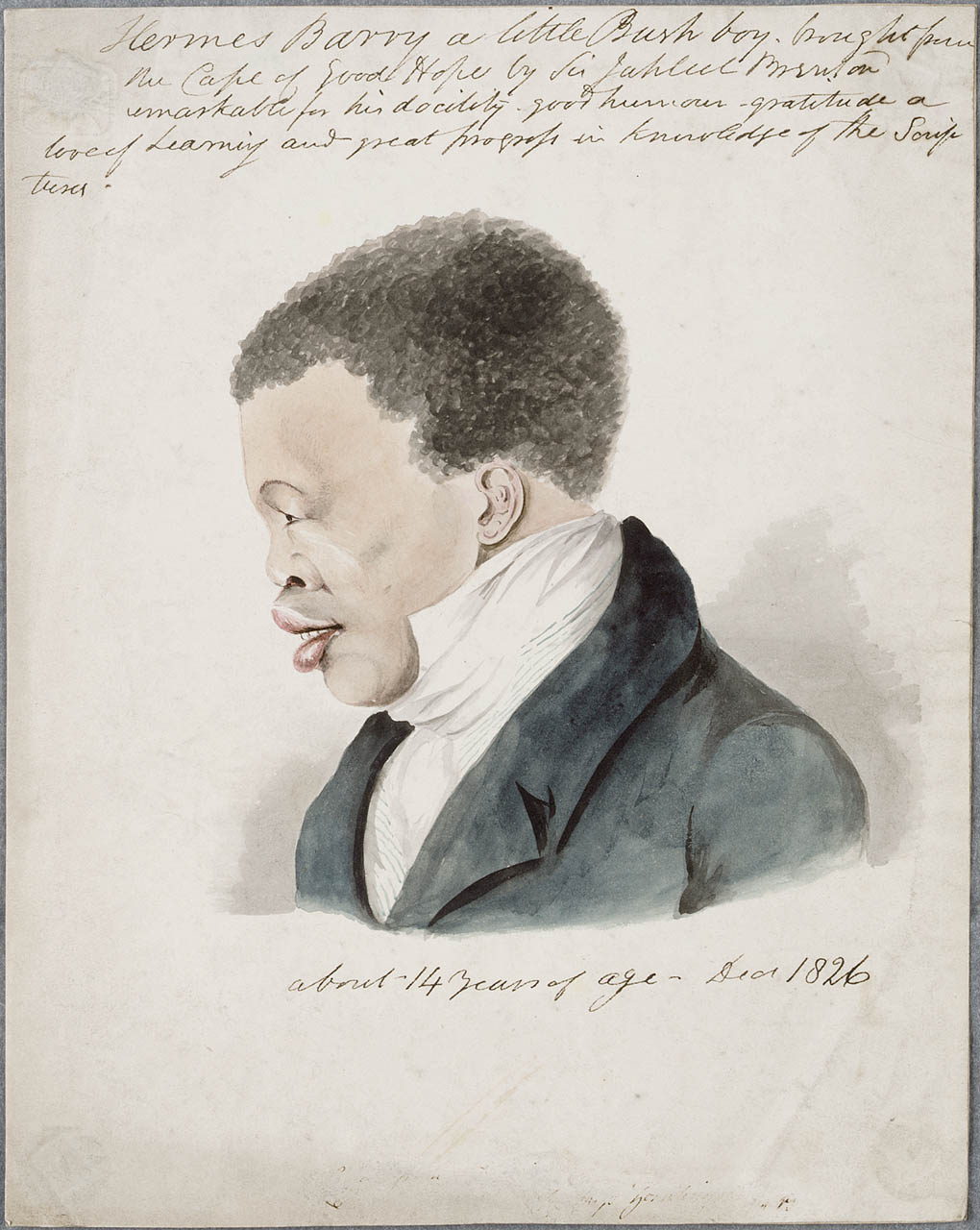
Hermes Barry, whom Brenton adopted in the Cape Colony

Brenton asked the Admiralty for a land-based position and in January 1814 he was appointed commissioner of the Port Mahon Dockyard. However, just months after his arrival, peace was declared with France and the dockyard, deemed surplus to requirements, was abandoned by the British. Brenton briefly took command of the royal yacht HMY Dorset before he was appointed naval commissioner at the Cape Colony. Brenton was made a Knight Commander of the Order of Bath in January 1815 and in March he arrived with his wife at the Cape Colony. Although his wound continued to aggrieve him he oversaw the expansion of the dockyard at Simon's Town and became a prominent advocate for the rights of Black dockyard workers and the Khoekhoe population. While in the Cape Colony, Brenton adopted a Khoekhoe boy into his household. The boy had been purchased from a Boer woman by James Barry, a British Army doctor treating Brenton's wife; after manumitting the boy, Barry renamed him Hermes Barry and consigned him to Brenton's care.

In July 1817 Brenton's wife died after a long illness and the following month he received news his eldest son, John Jervis Brenton, a pupil at Hyde Abbey School, had died suddenly from an "attack of fever and sore throat". As a consequence, Brenton increasingly sought comfort from his Christian faith, writing at the time that "...the Almighty in his wisdom and mercy knew what was best for me. He has afflicted me, and I humbly implore his Holy Spirit to give me perfect resignation to his Divine will." Simon's Town had become a busy port providing supplies to the island of Saint Helena after Napoleon was exiled there in 1815 but after his death in 1821 its importance diminished and the position of resident commissioner was abolished. Brenton returned to England later that year along with Hermes and temporarily took command of the royal yacht Royal Sovereign, conveying the Duke and Duchess of Clarence and St Andrews to Antwerp in the summer of 1822. That same year he married his cousin Harriet Brenton, the daughter of James Brenton, with whom he had a daughter. Hermes was employed in Brenton's household as a domestic servant but eventually returned to the Cape Colony due to his declining health from the English climate; his final fate is not definitively known.

=== Lieutenant-Governor of Greenwich Hospital ===
Brenton's wound was prone to frequent bouts of inflammation so he began a period of semi-retirement. In 1825 he was appointed Colonel of the Marines—a salaried sinecure role awarded to post captains with a distinguished service record. In 1829, aged 59, Brenton returned to active service as captain of HMS Donegal which had been fitted out as a guard ship at the Nore. Less than a year later Brenton was promoted to rear admiral in July 1830. However, HMS Donegal was unsuitable for a flagship and Brenton consequently returned to shore on half pay. In 1831 the First Lord of the Admiralty, Sir James Graham, offered Brenton the position of Lieutenant-Governor at Greenwich Hospital—a home for retired Royal Navy sailors. He initially declined the offer as the role precluded him from further promotion and active service but reconsidered after King William IV, an acquaintance and former naval officer, intervened and relaxed the conditions.

In addition to his duties at the hospital where he took up residence, Brenton embarked on a number of philanthropic interests, assisting with the establishment of the Society for the Relief of Shipwrecked Mariners and the creation of Sailors' Home, a boarding house in London that held daily religious services and sought to "preserve sailors from the temptations and deprivations to which they are exposed in London on returning from the sea." He also wrote pamphlets such as An Appeal to the British Nation on Behalf of her Sailors and The Hope of the Navy, or, The True Source of Discipline and Efficiency which suggested improvements for sailors welfare and argued for the importance of their religious instruction.

== Retirement and death ==
Suffering from frequent attacks of gout, Brenton retired from his position at Greenwich Hospital in 1840. The assurances made to Brenton by the King had been overlooked after his death in 1837, but soon after his retirement Brenton's seniority on the Navy List was restored and he was duly promoted to vice admiral. He subsequently moved to Casterton and then to Elford where he wrote a memoir of his brother, Captain Edward Pelham Brenton. He eventually settled in Leamington Spa where in 1844 his health deteriorated and he died of "general debility" on 21 April. He was buried in New Street Cemetery, Leamington Spa. His baronetcy passed to his son, Lancelot Charles Lee Brenton.

== Citations ==
Baronetage of the United Kingdom
New creation	Baronet (of London); 1812–1844	Succeeded by Lancelot Brenton
