= Prince of Wales (1789 ship) =

History

Great Britain
- Name: Prince of Wales
- Owner: Various
- Port of registry: Hull, later London
- Builder: Hull
- Launched: 1789
- Fate: Last listed in 1811

General characteristics
- Type: Ship
- Tons burthen: 279
- Propulsion: Sails
- Sail plan: Ship rig
- Armament: 1794–97: 2 × 6-pounder guns; 1798–99: 6 × 4-pounder guns

Prince of Wales was built at Hull in 1789, for P. Green. She spent the first eight or so years sailing from Hull to Russia and Prussia. In 1797 Green sold her to Staniforth & Co. Although Lloyd's Register shows her continuing in the same trade, actually during the time Staniforth & Co. owned her, she transported supplies to Botany Bay for the British government. Prince of Wales then carried a cargo from Canton back to England for the British East India Company (EIC). On her return Staniforth & Co. sold her to Blackman & Co., who sailed her on the London-West Indies run. She is last listed in Lloyd's Register in 1811, still trading with Antigua.

== Botany Bay and the voyage for the EIC (1796-98) ==
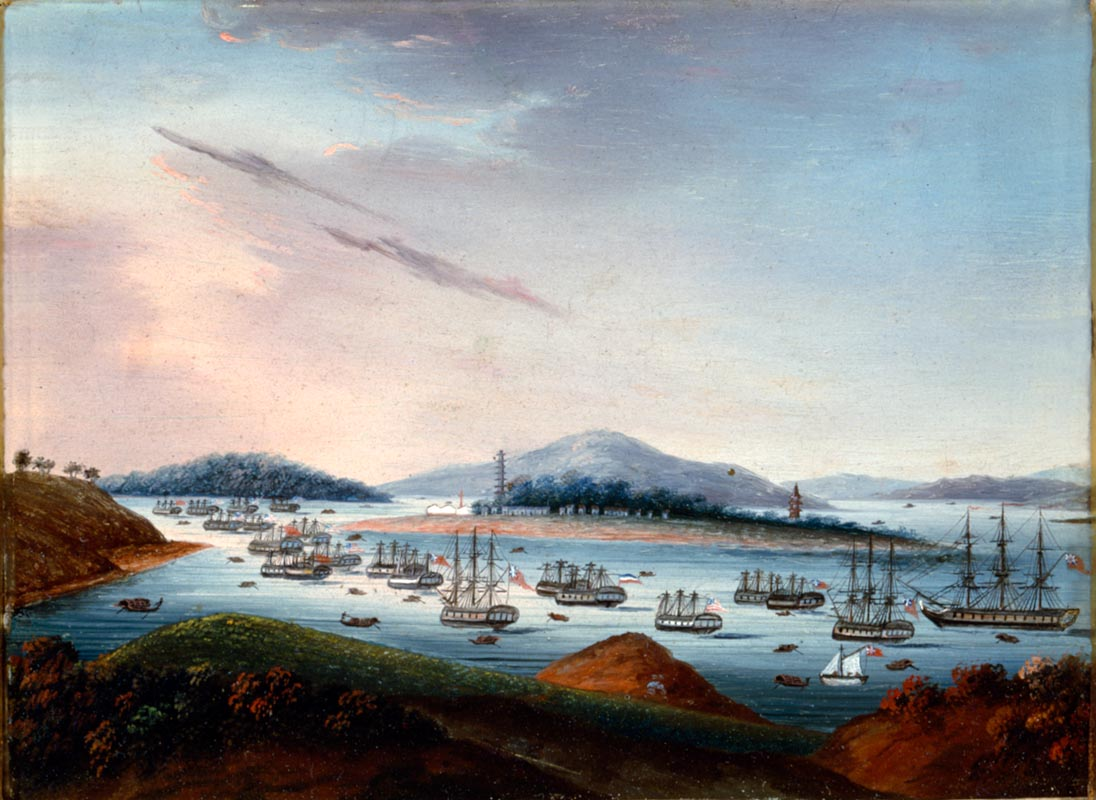
The Whampoa Anchorage, Prince of Wales' destination in 1796. Unknown artist, c. 1810

In 1795 the EIC hired Prince of Wales and contracted to deliver government provisions for the New South Wales colony. She left Portsmouth on 26 June under the command of Master William Milner, and carrying 111,216 pounds (50.4 metric tons) of beef and 261,678 pounds (118.7 metric tons) of pork.

The outward voyage was uneventful, with Prince of Wales rounding the Cape of Good Hope and proceeding eastward through the Southern Ocean to reach Port Jackson on 2 November. Her cargo was unloaded over a period of three weeks and the ship was reprovisioned for a trading voyage to Macao. While in Port Jackson she took aboard the colony's master boat builder, Daniel Paine, recently dismissed from his position for "insolent and contemptuous behaviour" and seeking a passage out of the colony.

Prince of Wales departed New South Wales on 18 November, heading northward along the coast. Milner planned to turn the ship northeast into the open ocean, then swing northwest in an arc towards Macao and the Whampoa anchorage to collect a cargo of tea. Sailing conditions were excellent with clear days and light winds throughout November and December. Despite this the ship was swiftly off course, and on 6 January 1797 made landfall among the Mariana Islands, around 4° west of their charted course. On 16 January she came within sight of Formosa but was unable to make landfall due to heavy seas.

Milner decided to make contact with the Chinese to ask for assistance in plotting a course for Macao. His efforts were unsuccessful; local fishing vessels simply sailed away whenever Prince of Wales approached. On 8 January Prince of Wales anchored off what may have been an island in the Wanshan Archipelago. Milner sighted a village by the beach and attempted to go ashore to ask for directions. Again he was rebuffed, with the villagers gathering on the beach to shout threats and beat gongs to raise an alarm.

=== Collision at sea ===
Prince of Wales raised anchor and returned to sea, sailing aimlessly north and east in the hope of finding a more hospitable village from which to seek a guide. Shortly after midnight on 22 January she collided with a Chinese ship, striking the Chinese vessel amidships and crushing her under Prince of Wales' bow. The English vessel suffered damage to her hull and the loss of her jib-boom, which fell over the side into the Chinese vessel. The smaller Chinese craft was more heavily damaged and began to sink, her crew scrambling overboard to avoid being dragged down with her. Several Chinese sailors sought to climb aboard Prince of Wales, panicking Milner's crew. Paine recorded in his journal that "the Alarm caused me to jump from my cot and run to the arms chest, but such was the call for cutlasses that it was not until the third or fourth attempt I could reach the deck, being accosted each time in the companionway with "O give me that cutlass sir, and get another for they are coming on board."

When Paine finally attained the quarterdeck, he described a scene of confusion:

The Captain was bawling to square the yards and stop the Ship's way; but with very little attention from the Ship's Company who impressed with the idea of Chinese pirates were alone intent in cutting and slashing away upon the vessel's rigging and sail and preventing the China-men from coming on board ... (The Chinese) clambered up the Fore-chains, impelled no doubt with the fear of their vessel sinking after receiving so violent a shock; this with the extreme darkness of the night and the confusion of voices crying out, "a light, a light, a cutlass, a cutlass, a handspike, here they come!" with the addition of the unintelligible jargon of the affrighted Chinese.

Those Chinese sailors who reached the English ship's deck were attacked with cutlasses and hurled back overboard, despite making "piteous cries" for mercy. The sinking Chinese vessel also disappeared quickly astern. Prince of Wales' crew regretted their actions the following day, when calmer consideration made clear the collision had been accidental and not part of a pirate attack.

=== Wanshan to Macao ===
Damaged but still seaworthy, Prince of Wales' continued her voyage. On 23 January Milner and Paine conferred on possible routes, with Milner insisting they were just 90 nautical miles (170 km) east of Macao. The ship turned east, but as more days passed it became clear they were still lost in the Wanshan Archipelago. On 3 February Paine observed that an island adjacent to the ship was the same one they had passed on 26 January. A village was sighted by a beach and Milner again went ashore to ask for directions. The attempt was fruitless, as Milner spoke only English and the villagers had no knowledge of European ports or languages. Paine recorded in his journal that, "they view us with the utmost astonishment ... as if they had never seen a European, or any ship other than their coasting junks."

Finally, on 5 February a Chinese merchant ship was sighted, and hove to in response to hails from Prince of Wales' crew. One of the Chinese vessel's crew agreed to act as pilot for the English ship and two days later Prince of Wales was within sight of the port of Macao.

On 16 April Prince of Wales was at Whampoa. After some delays Milner was able to negotiate with the port's mandarins to obtain a shipment of tea. On 6 June she crossed the Second Bar, and on 14 June, and in company with 13 other East Indiamen, Prince of Wales set sail for her return to England.

=== Return ===
An uneventful voyage followed, with Prince of Wales' reaching England in late 1797. An inspection of her hull and fittings revealed that her Pacific service had left her in decrepit condition and no longer fit for ocean voyages. Staniforth & Co. sold her to Blackman & Co. By Christmas 1797 she was at Fort Royal at Martinique, which had been in British hands since the battle of Martinique (1794). She then continued sailing between London and the West Indies, primarily to Antigua. She was no longer listed in 1812.

== Lloyd's Register ==
Year	Master	Owner	Trade	Notes
1789	Pfinskirk	Ph. Green	London-Archangel	279 tons (bm)
1790	J. Philips... Driver	P. Green	Hull-Königsberg	279 tons (bm)
1791	T. Driver	P. Green	Hull-Königsberg	279 tons (bm)
1792	T. Driver	P. Green	Hull-Königsberg	279 tons (bm)
1793	T. Driver	P. Green	Hull-Archangel	279 tons (bm)
1794	Brummet	P. Green	Hull-Königsberg	279 tons (bm); 2 × 6-pounder guns
1795	Brummet	P. Green	Hull-Königsberg	279 tons (bm); 2 × 6-pounder guns
1796	Brummet; Milner	P. Green	Hull-Archangel; Hull-Petersburg	279 tons;2 × 6-pounder guns
1797	W. Milner	Staniforth	London-Petersburg	279 tons (bm); 2 × 6-pounder guns
1798	W. Milner; Trew	Staniforth; P. Blackman	London-Petersburg; London-Martinque	279 tons (bm); 6 × 4-pounder guns
1799	J. Trew	Blackman	London-Antigua	279 tons (bm);6 × 4-pounder guns
1800	J. Trew	Blackman	London-Antigua	279 tons (bm)
1801	J. True	Blackman	London-Antigua	279 tons (bm)
1802	J. True	Blackman	London-Antigua	279 tons (bm)
1803	J. True	Blackman	London-Antigua	279 tons (bm)
1804	J. True	Blackman	London-Antigua	279 tons (bm)
1805	J. True	Blackman	London-Antigua	279 tons (bm)
1806	J. True	Blackman	London-Antigua	279 tons (bm)
1807	J. True	Blackman	London-Antigua	279 tons (bm)
1808	J. True	Blackman	London-Antigua	279 tons (bm)
1809	J. True	Blackman	London-Antigua	279 tons (bm)
1810	J. True	Blackman	London-Antigua	279 tons (bm)
1811	J. True	Blackman	London-Antigua	279 tons (bm)
