= HMS Placentia (1789) =

Sloop of the Royal Navy

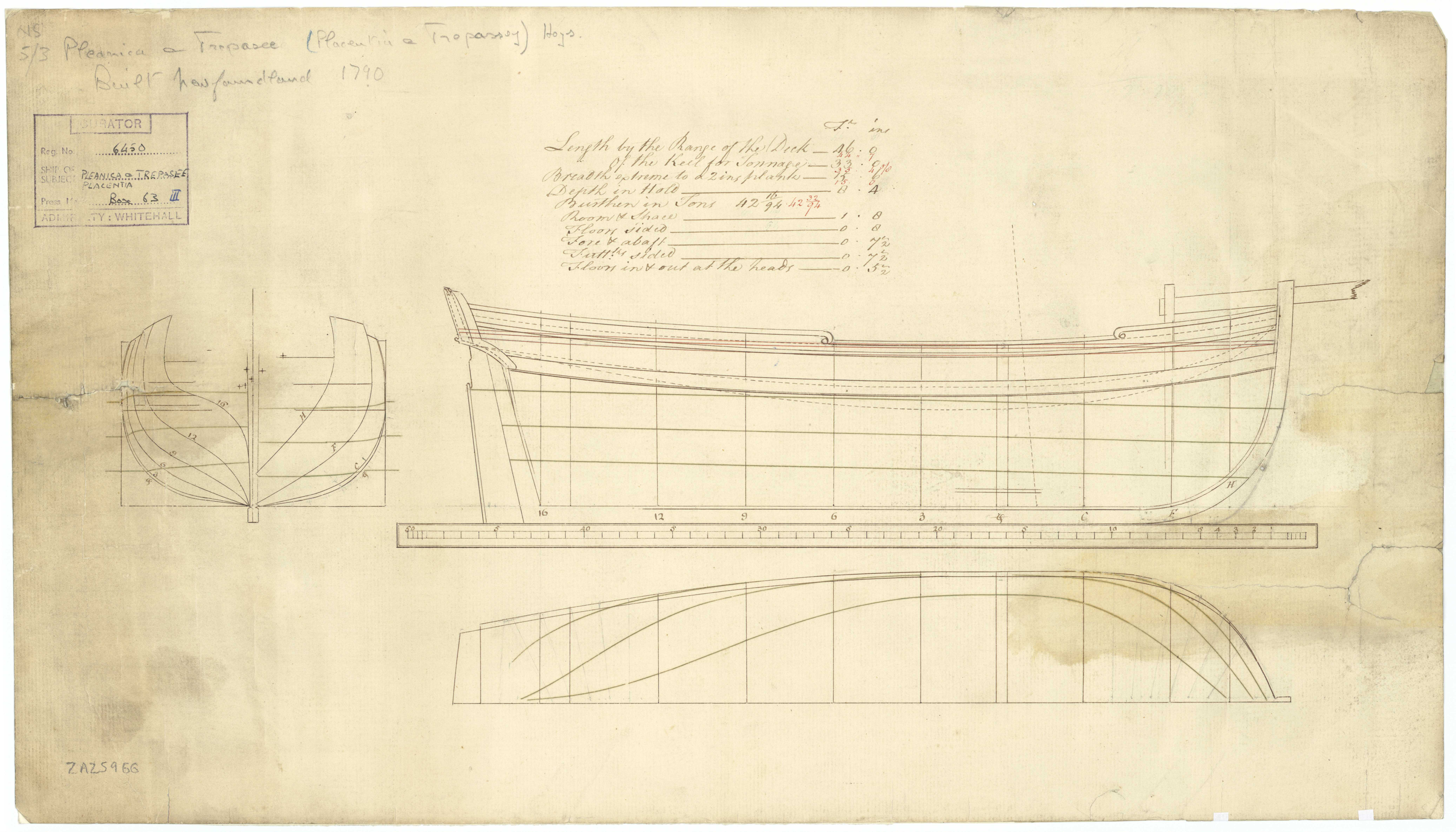
- Placenica

History

Great Britain
- Name: HMS Placentia
- Ordered: May 1789
- Builder: Jeffrey & Start, Newfoundland
- Launched: 1789
- Fate: Wrecked May 1794

General characteristics
- Class & type: Placentia-class sloop
- Tons burthen: 4233/94 (bm)
- Length: 44 ft 7 in (13.6 m) (overall); 35 ft 4 5/8 in (10.8 m) (keel)
- Beam: 15 ft 0 in (4.6 m)
- Depth of hold: 8 ft 4 in (2.5 m)
- Propulsion: Sails
- Sail plan: Sloop
- Complement: 30
- Armament: 4 x ½-pounder swivel guns

HMS Placentia was the name-ship of her two vessel class, with both vessels being launched in 1789. John Henslow designed the small sloops for coastal patrol duties off Newfoundland. She was wrecked in 1794.

== Career ==
Lieutenant Peter Halkett commissioned her in October 1789. He was followed in 1790 by Lieutenant Caither, who was followed in 1791 by Lieutenant Charles Herbert.

Herbert's successor, in 1792, was Lieutenant John Tucker. Placentia was rated as an armed sloop, and then as an armed ship. In 1794 Lieutenant Alexander Shippard (or Sheppard) assumed command.

== Fate ==
On 7 May 1794 Placentia was sailing towards Burin from Marisheen when a strong current drove her towards the island of Marticot. She anchored off a reef but next morning a swell pushed her onto the rocks. Her crew abandoned her in a sinking state.
