= Ann and Eliza (1789 ship) =

British merchant sailing ship wrecked in Algoa Bay

History

Great Britain
- Name: Ann and Eliza
- Builder: G. Gillet
- Launched: December 1789
- Fate: Lost 22 January 1796

General characteristics
- Tons burthen: 197, or 200, (bm)
- Propulsion: Sail

Ann and Eliza was launched at Calcutta in December 1789. She was the sixth vessel registered at Calcutta and the cost of her hull, masts, and copper sheathing was Rupees 34,000. Ann and Eliza, Haldane, master, was lost in Algoa Bay while on a voyage from Bengal to the Cape of Good Hope. The British East India Company (EIC) had engaged her in November 1795 in Bengal to carry stores to His Majesty's troops at the Cape. The EIC charged the loss to "His Majesty's Government". The amount of the loss, in terms of freight and cargo, was £37,522 8s 9d.

There is some ambiguity as to when she was lost. Lloyd's List gave the month and year as November 1795. Another source gives the date of loss as 22 January 1796. It stated that the loss occurred in the Cape Padrone area and the Ann and Eliza was carrying rice and arrack from Bengal to England. It further stated that six of the 42 people on board survived. Captain Richard Haldane was among those lost. A third source gave the loss as occurring in March 1796. The EIC gave the year of her loss as 1797.
