= Tarleton (1789 ship) =

History

Great Britain
- Name: Tarleton
- Builder: Liverpool
- Launched: 1789
- Fate: Captured 1797

France
- Acquired: 1797 by capture
- Fate: Sold 1803?

United Kingdom
- Name: Tarleton
- Acquired: c.1803 probably by purchase
- Fate: Probably wrecked 1818; last listed 1818 (LR) & 1824 (RS);

General characteristics
- Tons burthen: 286, or 298, or 299, or 300(bm)
- Propulsion: Sail
- Complement: 1793: 70; 1794:36
- Armament: 1793:22 × 12, 9, & 4-pounder guns; 1794:18 × 12&9-pounder guns; 1805:10 × 4&3-pounder guns; 1814:10 × 9-pounder guns

Tarleton (or Tarlton) was launched in 1789 at Liverpool for Tarleton & Co., a Liverpool firm that had been in the slave trade for three generations. She traded with the West Indies and made one voyage as a slave ship in the triangular trade in enslaved people. The French captured her after she had landed her captives. She returned to English hands c.1803 and sailed as a merchantman for some years thereafter. She appears to have been wrecked in April 1818.

== Career ==
Tarleton's first master was J. Gilbody.

On 5 August she was on her way from Grenada to Liverpool when a lightning strike damaged her, forcing her to go to St Thomas for repairs.

=== Privateer ===
Tarleton and Samuel Gilbody received a letter of marque on 31 May 1793. The size of the crew and the number of guns suggests that Tarletton would operate as a privateer.

On 16 July Tarleton was in company with the privateer Eliza, of Liverpool, Canny, master, at 32°30′N 18°40′W. They had with them a French privateer of eight guns and 70 (or 72) men that they had captured a few days earlier. This was Guerrier, of Bayonne. Guerrier was 21 days out of Bayonne and had taken nothing.

On 27 January 1794 Tarleton and Gilbody received a new letter of marque. Now she carried slightly fewer guns, and she had a crew of 36 men, half the size of her earlier crew, suggesting that she had stopped privateering.

=== Slave ship ===
In 1796 her master changed to Thomas Cannell, her primary owner to Daniel Backhouse (secondary remained Tarleton), and she became an enslaving ship, making one voyage from the Bight of Benin and Gulf of Guinea islands to Jamaica. She sailed from Liverpool on 2 June 1796.

In 1796, 103 British vessels left British ports on enslaving voyages. Ninety-four of these vessels sailed from Liverpool.

Tarleton arrived at Kingston, Jamaica, on 10 July 1797 with 423 captives. She also lost 6 of her 35 crew on the voyage.

=== Capture ===
The French captured Tarleton in 1797 after she had landed her slaves, but before she was able to return to Liverpool.

In 1797, 40 British enslaving vessels were lost. Thirteen were lost in the Middle Passage, sailing between the African coast and the West Indies. During the period 1793 to 1807, war, rather than maritime hazards or resistance by the captives, was the greatest cause of vessel losses among British enslaving vessels.

=== British merchantman ===
Tarleton reappeared in Lloyd's Register in 1804, with Stoddard, master, Phynn & Co., owner, and trade London–Demerara. She had also undergone a thorough repair. There is no evidence that Tarleton was a prize and the timing suggests that she may have been purchased during the Peace of Amiens.

Year	Master	Owner	Trade	Source & Notes
1805	Stodhart	Clark	London–Demerara	Register of Shipping (RS)
1810	R. Conner; Harmann	Stitt & Co.	London–Jamaica; London–Charleston	Lloyd's Register (LR); damage repaired 1808 & thorough repair 1809
1814	J. Payne	Mercer	Liverpool–Africa	RS; almost rebuilt 1813
1820	R.P. Jackson	R.P. Jackson	Liverpool–The Brazils	RS

== Fate ==
Tarleton, of Liverpool, Jefferson, master, was reported to have been at 6°N 22°W on 31 May 1817. Lloyd's List reported that a gale had driven Tarleton, Jefferson, master on shore at the Cape of Good Hope. She had come from Rio de Janeiro. It was not clear how badly damaged she was. She was consequently condemned on the beach. Her cargo, with the exception of some trifling accidents, was saved.

There is no other Tarleton in Lloyd's Register or the Register of Shipping than the Tarleton of this article. Tarleton is last listed in Lloyd's Register in 1818. The Register of Shipping last listed her in 1824, but noted that she had been last surveyed in 1817.
