= Rosalind (1799 ship) =

Spanish slave ship launched in 1789

History

Spain
- Launched: 1789
- Captured: 1799

Great Britain
- Name: Rosalind
- Owner: 1799:Chamley & Co.; 1799: Alexander Hoskins, Jonathan Dixon, & Benjamin Flesher; 1800: Alexander Hoskins, James Barton, Benjamin Cort, Jonathan Dixon, James Worrall, Thomas Chamley, & Benjamin Cuite
- Acquired: 1799 by purchase of a prize
- Fate: Captured c.1804

General characteristics
- Tons burthen: 218 bm
- Complement: 1799: 30; 1803: 35
- Armament: 1799: 22 × 6&9-pounder guns; 1803: 18 × 6&9-pounder guns

Rosalind was launched in 1789 in Spain and taken in prize in 1799. She made three voyages as a slave ship in the triangular trade in enslaved people. A French privateer captured her in 1804 while she was on her fourth voyage transporting enslaved people.

== Career ==
Rosalind entered Lloyd's Register in 1799 with B. Cuite, master, Chamley & Co., owners, and trade Liverpool–Africa. Captain Benjamin Cuite acquired a letter of marque on 6 July 1799.

First voyage transporting enslaved people (1799–1800)
Captain Cuite sailed from Liverpool on 31 July 1799. Rosalind gathered captives at New Calabar, and landed them on 2 February 1800, at Trinidad. She may have landed embarked some 360 captives. She left Trinidad on 31 March and arrived back at Liverpool on 17 May. She had left with 40 crew members and suffered three crew deaths on her voyage.

Second voyage transporting enslaved people (1800–1801)
Captain Cuite sailed from Liverpool on 25 October 1800. Rosalind gathered her captives at New Calabar, and landed them on 6 June 1801, at Trinidad. She may have landed some 279 captives. She left Trinidad on 18 July, and arrived back at Liverpool on 20 September. She had left with 33 crew members and had suffered eight crew deaths on her voyage.

Third voyage transporting enslaved people (1802–1803)
Captain Cuite sailed from Liverpool on 29 April 1802. Rosalind gathered captives at Calabar, and landed 241 on 30 December, at Saint Thomas, Danish Virgin Islands. She left St Thomas on 9 February 1803, and arrived back at Liverpool on 2 April. She had left with 29 crew members and had suffered two crew deaths on her voyage.

Captain James Brown acquired a letter of marque on 23 May 1803.

Fourth voyage transporting enslaved people (1803–loss)
Captain Brown sailed from Liverpool on 1 July 1803, with 39 crew members.

Lloyd's List reported on 27 September 1803, that Loyalist, Walton, master, had been sailing from Batavia to Amsterdam when Rosalind, of Liverpool, Brown, master, captured her and sent her into Bantry Bay.

By late 1803, Rosalind, Brown, master, was at Old Calabar.

== Loss ==
Lloyd's List reported on 16 March 1804, that Rosalind, Brown, master, had been taken and sent into Guadeloupe. She had been sailing from Africa to Antigua.

In 1804, 30 British slave ships were lost. Fifteen were lost in the Middle Passage, in the voyage between the African coast and the West Indies. During the period 1793 to 1807, war rather than maritime hazards or slave resistance was the greatest cause of vessel losses among British vessels transporting enslaved people.
