= Grenada Packet (1789 ship) =

History

Great Britain
- Builder: Cork
- Launched: 1789
- Captured: 16 April 1794
- Fate: Burnt April 1794

General characteristics
- Tons burthen: 172 (bm)
- Armament: 4 × 3-pounder guns

Grenada Packet was launched in Cork in 1789 as a West Indiaman. A nominally French privateer captured her in 1794; she burnt accidentally at Savannah while awaiting trial. Later, the United States Government paid compensation to Grenada Packet's owners as her captor had been fitted out as a privateer in the United States, in contravention of the post–5 June 1793 ban on the arming in the United States of French privateers.

== Career ==
Grenada Packet first appeared in Lloyd's Register (LR) in 1789.

Year	Master	Owner	Trade	Source
1789	H.Roche	Jn.Roche	Cork–Grenada	LR
1792	H.Roche; E.Yerling	Pedder & Co.	Cork–Grenada	LR
1793	E.Verling; Hamilton	Pedder & Co. Strachan	Cork–Grenada; London–Pensacola	LR
1794	Hamilton	Strachan	London–Pensacola	LR

== Fate ==
On 16 October 1793 Grenada Packet, Werryss, master, sailed from Gravesend, bound for Pensacola. Grenada Packet, Wemys, master, arrived in Jamaica from London, while bound to Pensacola.

Grenada Packet, Wemyss, master, was reported to have been taken and carried into Georgia. She had been on her way from Pensacola to London. Grenada Packet, a prize to Amie Point Petre, was reported to have burnt at Savannah.

== Legal issues ==
The date of capture was 16 April 1794 and the captor was Ami de la Pointe-à-Pitre (henceforth Ami).

Ami was the former American schooner Fair Play, which William Talbot, Edward Ballard, and John Sinclair had purchased at Charleston, South Carolina and had armed and outfitted for privateering. The process involved sending Fair Play to Guadeloupe, and assuming French registry. It also required Talbot sailing her to Guadeloupe and there assuming French citizenship on 28 December 1793. The aim was to circumvent the Act of June 5, 1793, which sought to preserve the neutrality of the United States in the war between Britain and France by outlawing the arming of United States vessels to sail against Great Britain with letters of marque issued by France.

Ami received her French commission on 2 January 1794, with Talbot as master. She sailed that same day and by the time she returned to Charleston she had taken nine prizes, including Grenada Packet.

Grenada Packet, Francis Hamilton, master, arrived at Savannah on 19 April. The French consul advertised her condemnation trial for 25 April. Before she could be libelled, a tar pot overturned and set fire to her. The burning ship floated past wharves and warehouses, and sank. Her value had been estimated at £2,500, and the value of her cargo at £13,849 19s 7d. The reason for the taring was that she was being fitted out as a privateer.

The United States established a board of commissioners to hear claims for recompense by owners of vessels seized in contravention of the post–5 June 1793 ban on the arming in the United States of French privateers. The board awarded $18,498.09 to the owners of Grenada Packet, Wemyss, master.
