= Alexander Shippard =

British Royal Navy rear admiral

Rear-Admiral Alexander Shippard
- Born: 3 March 1771
- Died: 4 April 1841 (aged 70)
- Occupation: Royal Navy rear-admiral

Alexander Shippard (3 March 1771 – 4 April 1841) was a British Royal Navy rear admiral.

== Biography ==
Shippard was born on 3 March 1771. He was the youngest son, by his wife, Margaret Walkinshaw, of Alexander Shippard, a purser in the navy, who was with Horatio Nelson in the Vanguard in 1798, and received a medal for the battle of the Nile, entered the navy in 1786 on board the Irresistible, bearing the broad pennant of Sir Andrew Snape Hamond. From 1788 to 1792 he successively served in the Scipio, Bellerophon, and Vengeance—all in the Channel. In 1792 he went out to Newfoundland in the Assistance, and on 23 October 1793 was promoted to be lieutenant in command of the Placentia tender. In 1795 and 1796 he was serving in the Camel storeship in the Mediterranean; in 1797 he took command of the Monarch, and cut out vessels off the Texel; subsequently, down to 1801, he was in the Montagu, for the most part in the Mediterranean, but afterwards in the West Indies. In 1801–2 he was in the Monarch in the North Sea, and in 1803 commanded the Admiral Mitchell cutter attached to the fleet under Lord Keith for the guard of the Narrow Seas. On 21 August 1803 he landed Georges Cadoudal, the Chouan chief, at Biville, between Dieppe and Tréport, and on 16 January in the following year he landed General Jean-Charles Pichegru at the same place. On 31 October 1803, being with the advanced squadron off Boulogne, he ran inshore and engaged a gun brig in charge of six sloops, some of which were armed; and, after an action of two hours and a half, during which the squadron was prevented by the contrary wind from giving him assistance, he drove the brig and one of the sloops on shore. Consequent on Keith's report of this spirited affair, Shippard received a sword of honour from the patriotic fund at Lloyd's, and was promoted to the rank of commander on 3 March 1804. He was later appointed to the Hornet in the West Indies. In 1805 he commanded the Surinam in the Mediterranean, and on 22 Jan. 1806 was advanced to post rank. In May 1807 he was appointed to the Banterer of 22 guns, which, by ‘the negligence and very culpable conduct’ of the lieutenant of the middle watch, and by ‘the culpable neglect’ of the master, was lost in the St. Lawrence on the night of 29 Oct. 1808. It appeared on the court-martial that the weather being bitterly cold the lieutenant of the watch, with the pilot's apprentice, the midshipman, and the quartermaster, went down to the gun-room to drink grog. The lieutenant was dismissed the service, and the court found that Shippard had made every possible exertion to save the ship, and afterwards to preserve the stores. He was acquitted of all blame, and was shortly afterwards appointed to the Namur, flagship of Vice-admiral Thomas Wells at the Nore. In 1812–13 he commanded the Asia in the North Sea. He had no further service, but became rear-admiral on 28 June 1838, received a pension for meritorious service, and died at Malta on 4 April 1841. Shippard married Jane, daughter of Admiral Sir John Knight, K.C.B., and left issue. Sir Sidney Shippard, K.C.M.G., formerly administrator of Bechuanaland, is his eldest grandson.

Shippard's elder brother, William Shippard (1764–1856), entered the navy on board the Medea in 1778. He was on the Nonsuch in the West Indies in 1782, and served in the battle of 9 April. In August 1797 he was at the blockade of Cadiz, under Lord St. Vincent, and in the subsequent battle, while in 1801 he served at the battle of Copenhagen. He was advanced to post rank in 1846, and died without issue on 6 July 1856.
