= Sir Charles Rowley, 1st Baronet =

Royal Navy Admiral (1770–1845)

Admiral Sir Charles Rowley Bt GCB GCH
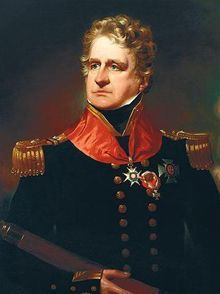
- Born: 16 December 1770
- Died: 10 October 1845 (aged 74); Brighton, Sussex
- Military career
- Allegiance: United Kingdom
- Branch: Royal Navy
- Rank: Admiral
- Commands: HMS Trepassey; HMS Lynx; HMS Cleopatra; HMS Hussar; HMS Unite; HMS Prince George; HMS Ruby; HMS Eagle; Nore Command; Jamaica Station; Portsmouth Command
- Conflicts: War of the Fifth Coalition; War of the Sixth Coalition
- Awards: Knight Grand Cross of the Order of the Bath; Knight Grand Cross of the Royal Guelphic Order

Admiral Sir Charles Rowley, 1st Baronet, GCB, GCH (16 December 1770 – 10 October 1845) was a Royal Navy officer who went on to be Commander-in-Chief, Portsmouth.

== Naval career ==
Rowley joined the Royal Navy in 1785. He received his first command in late 1789 when Admiral Milbanke appointed him to commission the newly launched sloop HMS Trepassey. Trepassey was a tiny vessel of 42 tons burthen, often referred to as a cutter, with a crew of six men.

Rowley was given command of HMS Lynx in 1794, HMS Cleopatra in 1795, HMS Hussar also in 1795 and HMS Unite in 1796.

In 1800 he took over HMS Prince George and in 1804 he was in HMS Ruby. In 1805 he was given command of HMS Eagle and took her on the Walcheren Campaign in 1809 and, during the War of the Sixth Coalition, took part in the capture of Fiume and of Trieste in 1813.

He was appointed Commander-in-Chief, The Nore in 1815, Commander in Chief, Jamaica Station in 1820 and Third Naval Lord in 1834. He was appointed a Groom of the Bedchamber to William IV in 1832, serving in the royal household until the accession of Queen Victoria in 1837.

Created a baronet in 1836, he was appointed Commander-in-Chief, Portsmouth in 1842.

He lived at Hill House (now Cranbourne Court) at Winkfield in Berkshire.

== Family ==
In 1797 he married Elizabeth King.

== See also ==
- O'Byrne, William Richard (1849). "Rowley, Charles" . A Naval Biographical Dictionary . John Murray – via Wikisource.

== Sources ==
- Cundall, Frank (1915). Historic Jamaica. West India Committee.

Military offices
Preceded by Sir Thomas Williams	Commander-in-Chief, The Nore; 1815–1818	Succeeded by Sir John Gore
Preceded by Sir Home Riggs Popham	Commander-in-Chief, Jamaica Station; 1820–1823	Succeeded by Edward Owen
Preceded by Sir Samuel Pechell	Third Naval Lord; 1834–1835	Succeeded by Sir George Elliot
Preceded by Sir Edward Codrington	Commander-in-Chief, Portsmouth; 1842–1845	Succeeded by Sir Charles Ogle
Baronetage of the United Kingdom
New creation	Baronet (of Hill House); 1836–1845	Succeeded by Charles Rowley
