= John Henslow (Surveyor of the Navy) =

Sir John Henslow (9 October 1730 – 22 September 1815) was a Surveyor to the Navy in the British (Royal Navy), a post he held jointly or solely from 1784 to 1806.

== Career ==
He was 7th child of John Henslow, a master carpenter in the dockyard at Woolwich.

- 1745 Apprenticed to Sir Thomas Slade
- 1762 Master Boat Builder at Woolwich
- 1771 Assistant Surveyor to the Navy
- 1784 Surveyor to the Navy
- 1793 Knighted
- 1806 retired to Sittingbourne, Kent

Cape Henslow on Guadalcanal is named after him.

From 1793 he worked jointly with William Rule.

Among the vessels he designed were the Acute-class gun-brigs and four frigates to the same design, the first of which was Phoebe. He also designed the Bloodhound-class gun-brigs and Conquest-class gun-brigs. The Laurel-class post ship sixth rates were a series of six ships built to his 1805 design. Perhaps his smallest vessels were the two Placentia-class sloops of 42 tons burthen, which he designed for coastal patrol duties off Newfoundland.

== Family ==
His son John Prentis Henslow, solicitor, was father of John Stevens Henslow. He was also the grandfather of Francis Hartwell Henslowe, who was the son of Edward Prentis Henslow.
