= List of shipwrecks in 1806 =

The list of shipwrecks in 1806 includes ships sunk, foundered, wrecked, grounded, or otherwise lost during 1806.

table of contents
1806
Jan	Feb	Mar	Apr
May	Jun	Jul	Aug
Sep	Oct	Nov	Dec
Unknown date

== January ==
=== 2 January ===
List of shipwrecks: 2 January 1806
Ship	State	Description
Hercules	United Kingdom	The ship was driven ashore near Ryde, Isle of Wight. She was on a voyage from London to Demerara. Hercules was later refloated.
Le Regulateur	France	The privateer, a schooner, was sunk off Cuba in an engagement with HMS Malabar and HMS Wolf (both Royal Navy).

=== 4 January ===
List of shipwrecks: 4 January 1806
Ship	State	Description
Columbia	United States	The ship was lost near Little Egg Harbour, New Jersey. She was on a voyage from Lisbon, Portugal to New York.
Vigilant	United Kingdom	The ship was driven ashore and wrecked at Boulogne, Pas-de-Calais, France. She was on a voyage from São Miguel, Cape Verde Islands to London.

=== 6 January ===
List of shipwrecks: 6 January 1806
Ship	State	Description
William and Mary	United Kingdom	The ship foundered in the Irish Sea off Milford Haven, Pembrokeshire with the loss of all hands.

=== 8 January ===
List of shipwrecks: 8 January 1806
Ship	State	Description
Vigilant	United Kingdom	The ship was driven ashore at Boulogne, Pas-de-Calais, France. She was on a voyage from São Miguel Island, Azores to London.

=== 9 January ===
List of shipwrecks: 9 January 1806
Ship	State	Description
Cecelia	United Kingdom	The ship foundered in the Irish Sea off Holyhead, Anglesey, with the loss of all hands. She was on a voyage from Dublin to Barbados.

=== 10 January ===
List of shipwrecks: 10 January 1806
Ship	State	Description
Atalante	French Navy	War of the Third Coalition, Battle of Blaauwberg: The Virginie-class frigate was run ashore and wrecked at the Cape of Good Hope to avoid capture by the British.
Bato	United Netherlands Navy	War of the Third Coalition, Battle of Blaauwberg: The third rate ship of the line was run ashore and set afire at the Cape of Good Hope to avoid capture by the British.
Governor Milne	United Kingdom	The ship ran onto rocks in the Isles of Scilly. She was later refloated and beached. Governor Milne was on a voyage from Grenada to London.
Grace	United States	The ship was driven ashore in Loch Ryan. She was on a voyage from Belfast, County Antrim, United Kingdom to New York.
Hawk	United Kingdom	The brig was driven ashore at Marfleet, Yorkshire.
Industry	United Kingdom	The ship foundered in the Irish Sea with the loss of all hands. She was on a voyage from Drogheda, County Louth, to Workington, Lancashire.
Mary Ann	United Kingdom	The ship was driven ashore in Loch Ryan. She was on a voyage from Greenock, Renfrewshire, to Charleston, South Carolina, United States.
Sally	United States	The ship was wrecked in Holyhead Bay.

=== 11 January ===
List of shipwrecks: 11 January 1806
Ship	State	Description
HMS Hibernia	Royal Navy	The first rate ship of the line capsized in the "Wembury River" — probably a reference to the River Yealm off Wembury, Devon, England — with the loss of 19 of her crew. She was later refloated, repaired and returned to service.
Unnamed	United States	The ship was lost near Katwijk, South Holland, Batavian Republic.

=== 12 January ===
List of shipwrecks: 12 January 1806
Ship	State	Description
Rising Star	United States	The ship was wrecked on the French coast.

=== 14 January ===
List of shipwrecks: 14 January 1806
Ship	State	Description
Duke of York	United Kingdom	The ship foundered in the Thames Estuary off Sheerness, Kent. Her four crew were rescued.

=== 15 January ===
List of shipwrecks: 15 January 1806
Ship	State	Description
Anson	Royal Navy	The Intrepid-class ship of the line was driven ashore at Portsmouth, Hampshire.
Colpoys	United Kingdom	The brig was reported driven from moorings and gone ashore at Portsmouth, but later refloated.
John	United Kingdom	The ship was driven ashore in Stokes Bay. She was later refloated and taken in to Portsmouth.
Union	United Kingdom	The ship was driven ashore at Portsmouth, but had been refloated by 17 January.

=== 16 January ===
List of shipwrecks: 16 January 1806
Ship	State	Description
Russel	United Kingdom	The collier foundered in the English Channel off Weymouth, Dorset with the loss of all ten people on board.

=== 17 January ===
List of shipwrecks: 17 January 1806
Ship	State	Description
Calder	United Kingdom	The ship was driven ashore at Orfordness, Suffolk with the loss of two of her crew. She was on a voyage from Selby, Yorkshire to London.
Jessie	United Kingdom	The ship sprang a leak and foundered in the North Sea off Flamborough Head, Yorkshire. Her crew were rescued by Betsey (United Kingdom). Jessie was on a voyeg from Newcastle upon Tyne, Northumberland to London.

=== 18 January ===
List of shipwrecks: 18 January 1806
Ship	State	Description
Margaret and Agnes	United Kingdom	The ship was wrecked on Rommanish Island, in Castlegolan Bay. She was on a voyage from Sligo to Greenock, Renfrewshire.

=== 20 January ===
List of shipwrecks: 20 January 1806
Ship	State	Description
Harriot	United Kingdom	The ship ran aground on the Ness Sand, in the Bristol Channel. She was refloated but drove ashore at Cowbridge, Glamorgan. Her crew were rescued. Harriot was on a voyage from Lisbon, Portugal to Bristol, Gloucestershire.
Tiber	United Kingdom	The ship was driven ashore and wrecked at Great Yarmouth, Norfolk.
Thomas	United Kingdom	The ship was wrecked on the Ness Sand. Her crew were rescued. She was on a voyage from Porto, Portugal, to Bristol, Gloucestershire.

=== 22 January ===
List of shipwrecks: 22 January 1806
Ship	State	Description
Penrhyn	United Kingdom	The ship was driven ashore and wrecked at Barry, Glamorgan. Her crew were rescued. She was on a voyage from Malta to Liverpool, Lancashire.

=== 23 January ===
List of shipwrecks: 23 January 1806
Ship	State	Description
Jason	Denmark	The galiot was driven ashore and wrecked at Ilfracombe, Devon, United Kingdom with the loss of all hands. She was on a voyage from Copenhagen to Bristol, Gloucestershire, United Kingdom.
Jenny's Adventure	United Kingdom	The ship was run down and sunk in the North Sea off the coast of Yorkshire by Broderick (United Kingdom). Three of her crew died.
Peggy	United Kingdom	The ship was driven ashore at Abbotsbury, Dorset, with the loss of all hands. She was on a voyage from Guernsey, Channel Islands, to Topsham, Devon.

=== 24 January ===
List of shipwrecks: 24 January 1806
Ship	State	Description
Ann	United Kingdom	The ship was driven ashore on Jura and was wrecked. She was on a voyage from Sligo to Greenock, Renfrewshire.
Friendship	United Kingdom	The ship was driven ashore and wrecked near Peterhead, Aberdeenshire. Her crew survived.
Jeremiah	United Kingdom	The sloop struck the Seat Rock, in the North Sea off Lindisfarne, Northumberland and sank. Her four crew survived. She was on a voyage from Montrose, Forfarshire, to Newcastle upon Tyne, Northumberland.
Unnamed	United States	The ship sank in the Vlie.
Three unnamed vessels	Flags unknown	The ships were wrecked in the Vlie.

=== 25 January ===
List of shipwrecks: 25 January 1806
Ship	State	Description
Prince of Wales	United Kingdom	The ship struck the Giant's Stairs Rocks, Cork and sank. She was on a voyage from Cork to London.

=== 26 January ===
List of shipwrecks: 26 January 1806
Ship	State	Description
Duke of York	United Kingdom	The ship was run down and sunk in the English Channel off Dungeness, Kent by Arethusa (United Kingdom) Three of her crew were killed. Duke of York was on a voyage from London to Constantinople, Ottoman Empire.
Harmony	United Kingdom	The ship was driven ashore on Lindisfarne, Northumberland and was wrecked with the loss of a crew member.

=== 27 January ===
List of shipwrecks: 27 January 1806
Ship	State	Description
Nile	United Kingdom	The ship foundered in the North Sea off Lowestoft, Suffolk. She was on a voyage from Saint Petersburg, Russia to London.

=== 28 January ===
List of shipwrecks: 28 January 1806
Ship	State	Description
Daphne	United Kingdom	The brig was driven onto the Spanish Battery Rocks, South Shields, County Durham.

=== 29 January ===
List of shipwrecks: 29 January 1806
Ship	State	Description
Anna	United Kingdom	The ship was driven ashore and wrecked at Gibraltar.
Sally	United Kingdom	The ship was abandoned by her crew, who were rescued by Boyd. She was on a voyage from Surinam to London.
Sarah Ann	United Kingdom	The ship was driven ashore at Gibraltar.
Many unnamed vessels	Flags unknown	More than 20 ships were driven ashore at Gibraltar.

=== 30 January ===
List of shipwrecks: 30 January 1806
Ship	State	Description
Ann and Theresa	United Kingdom	The ship was lost on the Nash Sands, in the Bristol Channel. Her three crew were rescued. She was on a voyage from Penclawdd, Glamorgan, to Bristol, Gloucestershire.

=== Unknown date ===
List of shipwrecks: Unknown date in January 1806
Ship	State	Description
Active	United Kingdom	The ship was driven ashore at Poole, Dorset. She was later refloated.
Adventure	United Kingdom	The ship was wrecked at Jersey, Channel Islands. Her crew were rescued. She was on a voyage from Malta to London.
Agenoria	United Kingdom	The ship foundered whilst on a voyage from Malta to London. Her crew were rescued.
Alliance	United Kingdom	The ship was driven ashore and wrecked at Ramsgate, Kent. She was on a voyage from British Honduras to London.
Amity	United States	The ship was wrecked on the Dutch coast.
Anna	United Kingdom	The ship was wrecked at Gibraltar. She was on a voyage from Smyrna, Ottoman Empire, to London.
Astrea	United Kingdom	The ship was driven ashore on Dragør, Denmark. She was on a voyage from Riga, Russia to Hull, Yorkshire. Astrea was later refloated and taken in to Copenhagen, Denmark.
Blossom	United States	The brig was wrecked at São Miguel, Azores.
Britannia	United Kingdom	The ship ran aground on the Sandhammer Reef. She was on a voyage from Saint Petersburg, Russia to Dundee, Forfarshire. Britannia was later refloated and put into Ystad, Sweden for repairs.
British Tar	United Kingdom	War of the Third Coalition: The ship was captured in the Mediterranean Sea by a French squadron and was burnt. She was on a voyage from Labradore, British North America to a Mediterranean port.
Calder	United Kingdom	The ship was driven ashore near Orfordness, Suffolk. She was on a voyage from Selby, Yorkshire to London.
Caledonia	United Kingdom	The ship was wrecked near Portpatrick, Wigtownshire, with the loss of all on board. She was on a voyage from Dublin to Saltcoats, Ayrshire.
Carl	United Kingdom	The ship was driven ashore and wrecked on the coast of Sussex. Her crew were rescued. She was on a voyage from Alicante, Spain to "Jacobotal".
Carolina	Batavian Republic	The ship was wrecked on Borkum, Prussia. She was on a voyage from Lisbon, Portugal to Amsterdam, North Holland.
Carpenter	United States	The ship was wrecked on the Dutch coast. She was on a voyage from Virginia to Antwerp, Deux-Nèthes, France.
Ceres	United Kingdom	The ship was driven ashore at North Meols, Lancashire, prior to 14 January. She was (incorrectly reported) to be on a voyage from Africa to Liverpool, Lancashire. Ceres was later refloated.
Cleverly	United Kingdom	The ship was driven ashore and wrecked at Hythe, Kent. Her crew were rescued. She was on a voyage from Ipswich, Suffolk to Bridport, Dorset.
Concordia	Russia	The ship was driven ashore near Copenhagen. She was on a voyage from Saint Petersburg to Lisbon. Concordia was later refloated and taken in to Copenhagen for repairs.
Dasher	United Kingdom	The ship was driven ashore at Gosport, Hampshire.
Dolphin	United Kingdom	The ship was driven ashore near Liverpool. She was on a voyage from Liverpool to Sligo.
Elizabeth	Flag unknown	The ship was wrecked on the Dutch coast. Her crew were rescued. She was on a voyage from Boston to Rotterdam, South Holland, Batavian Republic.
Felicity	United Kingdom	The ship ran aground on the Sandhammer Reef. She was on a voyage from Memel, Prussia to Newcastle upon Tyne, Northumberland.
Friends	United Kingdom	The ship was driven ashore at Portsmouth, Hampshire. She was bound for Demerara. She was later refloated.
General Green	United States	The ship was driven ashore in the Nieuw Deep. She was on a voyage from Maryland to Amsterdam, North Holland, Batavian Republic. General Green was later refloated.
George	United Kingdom	The ship was wrecked at Cirello, Kingdom of Sicily. She was on a voyage from Cirello to London.
Helder	United Kingdom	The transport ship was lost on the Dutch coast. All on board were rescued.
Hope	United Kingdom	The ship was wrecked on the south coast of the Isle of Wight. She was on a voyage from Tenerife, Canary Islands, to London.
Janus	United Kingdom	The ship foundered off Ilfracombe, Devon with the loss of all hands. She was on a voyage from Huelva, Spain to Bristol, Gloucestershire.
Jean	United Kingdom	The ship was driven ashore at "Drumfork Ferry".
Joan	United Kingdom	The ship was driven ashore on the Clyde. She was bound for Antigua.
John	United Kingdom	The ship ran aground at Dunbar, Lothian. She was on a voyage from King's Lynn, Norfolk to Leith, Lothian.
John	United Kingdom	The ship was driven ashore at Ravenglass, Cumberland. Her crew were rescued.
John	United Kingdom	The ship was driven ashore at Liverpool. She was bound from that port to the United States.
John & Mary	United Kingdom	The ship was driven ashore at Bridlington, Yorkshire. She was on a voyage from Memel to Boston, Lincolnshire.
Juno	Russia	The ship was driven ashore and wrecked on Texel, North Holland, Holland.
Live Oak	United Kingdom	The ship was lost in the River Avon. She was on a voyage from Bristol, Gloucestershire, to London.
HMS Manly	Royal Navy	The Archer-class gun-brig ran aground in the Emms. She was subsequently captured by the Dutch.
Margaret	United Kingdom	The ship foundered whilst on a voyage from Greenock, Renfrewshire, to Limerick. Her crew were rescued.
Mary	United Kingdom	The ship was driven ashore at Bridlington, Yorkshire.
Mercurius	Denmark	The brigantine was driven ashore and wrecked at Dunbar, Lothian, United Kingdom. She was on a voyage from Bordeaux, Basses-Pyrénées, France to Leith, Lothian.
Nancy	United Kingdom	The ship sank at Ramsgate. She was on a voyage from Deptford, Kent to Plymouth, Devon.
Neptune	United Kingdom	The ship was driven ashore in Bootle Bay. She was on a voyage from Liverpool to the West Indies.
Neptune	United Kingdom	The ship was wrecked on Alderney, Channel Islands. She was on a voyage from Bristol to Guernsey, Channel Islands.
Neptune	United Kingdom	The ship was driven ashore near Wells-next-the-Sea, Norfolk. She was on a voyage from Whitby, Yorkshire to London.
New York Packet	United States	The ship was wrecked on the Spanish coast. She was on a voyage from New York to a Spanish port.
Nimble	United Kingdom	The ship was driven ashore in Caernarvon Bay. She was on a voyage from Porto, Portugal, to Liverpool.
Peace	United Kingdom	The ship was wrecked on the Irish coast. She was on a voyage from Newfoundland, British North America to Cork.
Peggy	United Kingdom	The ship was driven ashore at Ryde, Isle of Wight. She was later refloated and taken in to Portsmouth.
Peggy	United Kingdom	The ship was driven ashore in the Humber. She was on a voyage from South Shields, County Durham, to London.
Rachael	United Kingdom	The ship foundered in the North Sea off Great Yarmouth, Norfolk. She was on a voyage from Berwick-upon-Tweed, Northumberland to Portsmouth.
Rachael and Jane	United Kingdom	The ship ran aground on The Skerries, in the Irish Sea off the coast of County Antrim. She was on a voyage from Dublin to Londonderry.
Resolution	United Kingdom	The ship foundered in the North Sea off Cromer, Norfolk. She was on a voyage from the Humber to London.
Ranger	United Kingdom	The ship foundered off Whitehaven, Cumberland. Her crew were rescued. She was on a voyage from Liverpool to Larne, County Antrim.
Romulus	United States	The ship was driven ashore at "Strom Point".
Sally	United Kingdom	The ship was driven ashore on Walney Island, Lancashire. Her crew were rescued.
HMS San Josef	Royal Navy	The first rate was driven ashore at Falmouth, Cornwall before 20 January.
Sarah Ann	United Kingdom	The ship was driven ashore and severely damaged in Gibraltar Bay. She was on a voyage from Zante, Septinsular Republic to Hull, Yorkshire.
Severn	United Kingdom	The ship was driven ashore in Bootle Bay. She was on a voyage from Cork to Liverpool.
Speculation	United Kingdom	The ship was driven ashore near Portsmouth, Hampshire. She was on a voyage from Lancaster, Lancashire, to Barbados. Speculation was later refloated.
Susannah	United Kingdom	The ship was driven ashore at Dungeness, Kent.
Susannah	United Kingdom	The ship was driven ashore in Bootle Bay. She was on a voyage from Liverpool to the West Indies.
Telamon	United Kingdom	The ship was wrecked on the West Hoyle Sandbank, in Liverpool Bay with the loss of all hands. She was on a voyage from Liverpool to Jamaica.
Thomas & Mary	United Kingdom	The ship was driven ashore near Bridlington. She was later refloated and taken in to Bridlington.
Tom	United Kingdom	The ship was driven ashore in the Orkney Islands. She was on a voyage from Riga to Chester, Cheshire.
Trio	United Kingdom	The ship was driven ashore on the Sandhammer Reef. Her crew were rescued. She was on a voyage from Danzig to Bristol. Trio was destroyed by fire on 25 January.
Warren	United States	The ship was driven ashore and wrecked on Texel, North Holland, Batavian Republic. Her crew were rescued
William	United Kingdom	The ship capsized in the North Sea off the Dogger Bank. At least four of her crew survived. She was on a voyage from Memel to Rye, Sussex.

== February ==
=== 2 February ===
List of shipwrecks: 2 February 1806
Ship	State	Description
Goodintent	United Kingdom	The ship was abandoned at sea. Her crew were rescued by HMS St George (Royal Navy). Goodintent was on a voyage from Newcastle upon Tyne, Northumberland to Grenada.

=== 3 February ===
List of shipwrecks: 3 February 1806
Ship	State	Description
Isabella	United Kingdom	The West Indiaman ran aground on the Horse Sand, in the Solent. She was on a voyage from Grenada to London.
Lord Middleton	United Kingdom	War of the Third Coalition: The ship was captured off the Isles of Scilly by the privateer La Courier de la Manche (France). She was recaptured off Guernsey, Channel Islands, by HMS Strenuous (Royal Navy) on 6 March. No further trace.
William	United Kingdom	The ship was driven ashore at Dunmore East, County Waterford. She was on a voyage from Liverpool, Lancashire, to the West Indies.

=== 4 February ===
List of shipwrecks: 4 February 1806
Ship	State	Description
Bellesarius	United States	The ship was driven ashore and wrecked at Boston, Massachusetts. She was on a voyage from Calcutta, India to Salem, Massachusetts.
Jane	United Kingdom	The ship was driven ashore and wrecked at Boston, Massachusetts.

=== 6 February ===
List of shipwrecks: 6 February 1806
Ship	State	Description
Diomède	French Navy	War of the Third Coalition, Battle of San Domingo: The Téméraire-class ship of the line was captured by the Royal Navy off Hispaniola. She was set afire and sunk.
Impérial	French Navy	War of the Third Coalition, Battle of San Domingo: The Océan-class ship of the line was beached on Hispaniola. She was later captured by the Royal Navy. Impérial was set afire and sunk.
Lord Middleton	United Kingdom	War of the Third Coalition: The ship, which had been captured by the privateer Le Courier de la Manche (France) on 3 February, was recaptured by HMS Strenuous (Royal Navy) off the Channel Islands. No further trace, presumed foundered in the English Channel with the loss of all hands.

=== 7 February ===
List of shipwrecks: 7 February 1806
Ship	State	Description
Lady Ann	United Kingdom	The ship departed from The Downs for São Miguel, Azores. No further trace, presumed foundered with the loss of all hands.

=== 9 February ===
List of shipwrecks: 9 February 1806
Ship	State	Description
Experiment	United States	The ship departed from Philadelphia, Pennsylvania, for the River Plate. No further trace, presumed foundered with the loss of all hands.
Fortune	(United Kingdom of Great Britain and Ireland) Jersey	The ship sank at Plymouth, Devon. She was on a voyage from Jersey, Channel Islands to Bristol, Gloucestershire.

=== 11 February ===
List of shipwrecks: 11 February 1806
Ship	State	Description
Britannia	United Kingdom	Britannia blew up while in the harbour at Cobh, County Cork with the loss of at least ten lives.
Endymion	United Kingdom	The ship was wrecked off Bermuda. Her crew were rescued. She was on a voyage from New York, United States to Jamaica.

=== 13 February ===
List of shipwrecks: 13 February 1806
Ship	State	Description
Ann and Ellen	United Kingdom	The ship ran aground on the Horse Bank, in the Irish Sea 10 nautical miles (19 km) off Lytham St. Annes, Lancashire. All eighteen people on board were rescued on 15 February. Ann and Ellen was on a voyage from Saint Vincent to Liverpool, Lancashire.
Buxar	United Kingdom	War of the Third Coalition: The ship was captured in the North Sea by a French privateer. She was plundered and scuttled. Buxar was on a voyage from Aberdeen to London.
Juffrouw Martz Dermens	Prussia	The ship was driven ashore and wrecked at Blyth, Northumberland, United Kingdom.

=== 14 February ===
List of shipwrecks: 14 February 1806
Ship	State	Description
Jefferson	United States	The ship was wrecked on the Mayaguana Reef. She was on a voyage from New York to Jamaica.
William	United Kingdom	The ship foundered in Bigbury Bay. Her crew were rescued. She was on a voyage from London to Bristol, Gloucestershire.

=== 15 February ===
List of shipwrecks: 15 February 1806
Ship	State	Description
Louisa	Hamburg	The ship was driven ashore at Londonderry, United Kingdom and was wrecked.

=== 16 February ===
List of shipwrecks: 16 February 1806
Ship	State	Description
Beefsteaks	United Kingdom	The ship was wrecked near Halifax, Nova Scotia, British North America. She was on a voyage from Halifax to Jamaica.

=== 17 February ===
List of shipwrecks: 17 February 1806
Ship	State	Description
HMS Dragon	Royal Navy	The third-rate ship of the line ran aground on the Île de Ré, Finistère, France. She was later refloated, repaired and returned to service.
Samuel Jackson	United States	The ship was wrecked on Heneaga. Her crew were rescued. she was on a voyage from New York to Jamaica.

=== 18 February ===
List of shipwrecks: 18 February 1806
Ship	State	Description
Le Vengeur	France	The privateer was driven ashore and wrecked at Vlissingen, Zeeland, Batavian Republic with the loss of all but on of her crew.
Robert	United Kingdom	The ship foundered in the North Sea off Great Yarmouth, Norfolk. Her crew were rescued. She was on a voyage from Dunbar, Lothian, to London.

=== 19 February ===
List of shipwrecks: 19 February 1806
Ship	State	Description
Friendship	United Kingdom	The ship foundered in the Grand Banks of Newfoundland. She was on a voyage from the United States to Greenock, Renfrewshire.
Jane	United Kingdom	The ship was wrecked on Grand Caicos. She was on a voyage from Halifax, Nova Scotia, British North America to Jamaica.
Lark	United Kingdom	War of the Third Coalition: The ship was captured and burnt by Comète, Diligent and Félicité (all French Navy). Lark was on a voyage from Philadelphia, Pennsylvania, United States to Jamaica.

=== 21 February ===
List of shipwrecks: 21 February 1806
Ship	State	Description
Diana	United Kingdom	The transport ship was driven ashore at South Foreland, Kent.

=== 23 February ===
List of shipwrecks: 23 February 1806
Ship	State	Description
Henry	United Kingdom	The ship was wrecked in Ballyherge Bay. She was on a voyage from London to Limerick.
Industry	United States	The ship sprang a leak and was abandoned. She was on a voyage from Savannah, Georgia, to Jamaica.
Unnamed	United Kingdom	The brig struck a rock off Staple Island, Northumberland ans was wrecked. Her crew survived. She was on a voyage from Aberdeen to London.

=== 25 February ===
List of shipwrecks: 25 February 1806
Ship	State	Description
Matilda	Spain	The ship was wrecked at Estepona. She was on a voyage from Málaga to Veracruz, Viceroyalty of New Granada.

=== 26 February ===
List of shipwrecks: 26 February 1806
Ship	State	Description
Bedford	United Kingdom	The ship was driven ashore in the Clyde. She was on a voyage from the Clyde to Charleston, South Carolina, United States.
Romulus	United Kingdom	The ship was driven ashore in the Clyde.
Ruth	United Kingdom	The ship was driven ashore in the Clyde.
Trepassey	United Kingdom	The ship was driven ashore in the Clyde. She was on a voyage from the Clyde to Newfoundland, British North America.
Union	United Kingdom	The ship was driven ashore in the Clyde. She was on a voyage from the Clyde to Jamaica.

=== 27 February ===
List of shipwrecks: 27 February 1806
Ship	State	Description
Charles	United States	The ship was driven ashore and damaged in the "Wester Hever". She was on a voyage from New York to Bremen. Charles was later refloated.
Doris	United Kingdom	The ship was driven ashore and wrecked near Cuxhaven. All on board were rescued.
Hoffnung	Hamburg	The ship was driven ashore and wrecked near Hamburg. She was on a voyage from London, United Kingdom to Hamburg.
HMS Jupiter	Royal Navy	The ship was accidentally set on fire in Port Royal, Jamaica. She was scuttled in order to extinguish the fire. She was subsequently repaired and returned to service.
Stadt Husum	(Denmark) Norway	The ship ran aground and was wrecked between the Eyder and "Hever". She was on a voyage from Bergen to a Mediterranean port.

=== 28 February ===
List of shipwrecks: 28 February 1806
Ship	State	Description
Leer	Hamburg	The ship was wrecked on the Dutch coast.
Robert	United Kingdom	The ship foundered in the North Sea off Great Yarmouth, Norfolk. Her crew survived. She was on a voyage from Dunbar, Lothian to London
Thetis	United States	The ship was wrecked on Terschelling, Friesland, Batavian Republic with the loss of all but five of her crew. She was on a voyage from New York to Amsterdam, North Holland, Batavian Republic.

=== Unknown date ===
List of shipwrecks: Unknown date in February 1806
Ship	State	Description
Agincourt	United Kingdom	The ship was driven ashore in the River Shannon. She was on a voyage from Tortola to London. She was later refloated.
Ann & Hope	United States	The ship was wrecked on Block Island, Rhode Island. She was on a voyage from the Isle de France, Mauritius to Rhode Island.
Anna and Ellen	United Kingdom	The ship was driven ashore near Lytham, Lancashire, coast and was wrecked. She was on a voyage from Saint Vincent to Liverpool, Lancashire.
Ant	United Kingdom	The ship was driven ashore and damaged at Beaumaris, Anglesey. she was on a voyage from South Carolina, United States to Liverpool, Lancashire. Ant was later refloated. Also reported as Ann, on a voyage from North Carolina to Liverpool.
Berwick Merchant	United Kingdom	The ship was driven ashore at Berwick upon Tweed. She was on a voyage from London to Berwick upon Tweed.
Betsey	United Kingdom	The ship was wrecked on the Welsh coast with the loss of two of her crew. She was on a voyage from Plymouth, Devon, to Bristol, Gloucestershire.
Betsey	United Kingdom	The ship was wrecked on St Damans Rocks, Isles of Scilly with the loss of five of her eight crew.
Brilliant	United Kingdom	The transport ship was driven ashore near Portsmouth, Hampshire. She was later refloated and put into Portsmouth for repairs.
Brothers	United Kingdom	War of the Third Coalition: The ship was captured by the French whilst on a voyage from Tobago to London. She was set afire and sunk.
Caroline	France	The ship foundered whilst on a voyage from Morlaix, Finistère, France to Bordeaux, Basses-Pyrénées, France.
Country Squire	United Kingdom	The ship was driven ashore near Lymington, Hampshire. She was on a voyage from Jamaica to Liverpool. Country Squire was refloated on 9 February and put into Cowes, Isle of Wight.
Eliza	United Kingdom	The ship was driven ashore near Dublin. She was on a voyage from Liverpool to Jamaica. Eliza was later refloated and put into Dublin.
Elizabeth	United Kingdom	The ship struck an anchor and sank at Dublin. She was on a voyage from Swansea, Glamorgan, to Dublin.
Experiment	United Kingdom	The ship capsized in the River Shannon and was severely damaged. She was on a voyage from Limerick to Liverpool.
Experiment	United States	The ship departed from Norfolk, Virginia, for the River Plate on or about 9 February. No further trace, presumed foundered with the loss of all hands.
Esther	United Kingdom	The ship was driven ashore on Dragør, Denmark and was wrecked. She was on a voyage from Memel, Prussia to Liverpool. Esther was later refloated.
Fortuna	United Kingdom	The ship sprang a leak in the Formby Channel and was beached with the loss of two lives. She was on a voyage from the Charente to Liverpool.
Friends	United Kingdom	The ship was driven ashore in Dunmannus Bay. She was on a voyage from St. Lucia to Liverpool.
Gage	United Kingdom	War of the Third Coalition: The ship was captured and set afire by a French privateer. She was recaptured by HMS Kite (Royal Navy). The fire was extinguished with difficulty.
George & Ann	United Kingdom	The ship was driven ashore and wrecked at Bonmahon, County Waterford. She was on a voyage from Liverpool to Waterford.
Goldfinch	United Kingdom	War of the Third Coalition: The ship was captured by the French whilst on a voyage from Tobago to London. She was set afire and sunk.
Hoffnung	Danzig	The ship was wrecked on Bornholm, Denmark. She was on a voyage from Danzig to Liverpool.
Hope	United Kingdom	The ship was driven ashore in the Isles of Scilly. She was on a voyage from Falmouth, Cornwall, to Neath, Glamorgan. Hope was later refloated.
Hope	United Kingdom	The ship was wrecked at the Old Head of Kinsale, County Cork with the loss of a crew member. She was on a voyage from Jamaica to Liverpool.
Leander	United Kingdom	The ship ran aground on the Black Middens, in the North Sea off the coast of County Durham before 8 February. She was refloated on 18 February and taken in to South Shields, County Durham.
Liberty	United States	The ship foundered in the North Sea off Vlissingen, Zeeland, Batavian Republic.
Lincoln	United Kingdom	The ship was driven ashore and severely damaged. She was on a voyage from Jamaica to Liverpool. She was refloated and taken in to Milford Haven, Pembrokeshire.
London Packet	United Kingdom	The ship was driven ashore and severely damaged in the Isles of Scilly. She was on a voyage from Milford, Pembrokeshire to London. The ship was later refloated.
Marcus	Batavian Republic	The ship was captured by the French whilst on a voyage from Lisbon, Portugal to Amsterdam, North Holland. She was set afire and sunk.
Margery & Mary	United Kingdom	The ship was driven ashore near Wexford. She was on a voyage from Liverpool to Africa. She was refloated on 26 February and put into Wexford.
Mark	United Kingdom	The ship foundered off Milford Haven, Pembrokeshire. She was on a voyage from London to Bristol.
Mary	United Kingdom	The ship ran aground near Cork. She was on a voyage from London to Kinsale, County Cork.
Mary	United Kingdom	The ship was driven ashore and wrecked on "Branoch Island". She was on a voyage from Jamaica to Dublin.
Mary Ellen	(United Kingdom of Great Britain and Ireland) Guernsey	War of the Third Coalition: The ship was captured and burnt by a French squadron. She was on a voyage from Guernsey to Newfoundland
Mentor	United Kingdom	The ship was wrecked at Dublin with the loss of three of her crew. She was on a voyage from Liverpool to Dublin.
Nicholas & Jane	United Kingdom	The ship foundered off Helsingør, Denmark with the loss of all but three of her crew. She was on a voyage from Riga, Russia to Plymouth, Devon.
Peggy	United Kingdom	The ship was driven ashore and wrecked on the Dorset coast. She was on a voyage from Guernsey, Channel Islands, to Topsham, Devon.
Peggy	United Kingdom	The ship was driven ashore on the Lincolnshire coast.
Pitt	United Kingdom	The transport ship was driven ashore near Portsmouth. She was later refloated and put into Portsmouth for repairs.
Polly	United Kingdom	War of the Third Coalition: The ship was captured by a French privateer in The Swin and was abandoned by her crew. She was subsequently taken in to Harwich, Essex.
Providence	United Kingdom	The ship was driven ashore and wrecked at Bridlington, Yorkshire.
Prudence	United Kingdom	The schooner foundered whilst on a voyage from Leith, Lothian, to Porto. Her crew were rescued.
Roebuck	United States	The ship foundered in the Vlie. She was on a voyage from Philadelphia, Pennsylvania, to Amsterdam.
Sparrow	United Kingdom	War of the Third Coalition: The ship was captured by the French whilst on a voyage from Newfoundland, British North America to a Mediterranean port. She was set afire and sunk.
St. Andrew	United States	The ship was wrecked on Texel, North Holland. She was on a voyage from Charleston, South Carolina, to Amsterdam.
St Johannes	Duchy of Holstein	The ship was driven ashore and wrecked near Dunkirk, Nord, France. She was on a voyage from Cádiz, Spain to Tönningen.
Ticonia	United States	The ship was driven ashore at Den Helder, North Holland.
Waaksomkeyt	Prussia	The ship foundered in the Bay of Biscay off Bayonne, Basses-Pyrénées, France. She was on a voyage from St. Andero, Spain to Emden.
Welwaaren	Batavian Republic	The ship was captured by the French whilst on a voyage from Lisbon to Amsterdam. She was set afire and sunk.
William	United Kingdom	The ship was driven ashore on the Lincolnshire coast.
William	United Kingdom	The ship was driven ashore on the west coast of Ireland. She was on a voyage from Demerara to Liverpool.

== March ==
=== 1 March ===
List of shipwrecks: 1 March 1806
Ship	State	Description
Ann	United States	The ship was driven ashore on Goree, Zeeland, Batavian Republic. Her crew were rescued. She was on a voyage from Baltimore, Maryland, to Amsterdam, North Holland, Batavian Republic.
Friends	United Kingdom	The ship was driven ashore at Holyhead, Anglesey. She was on a voyage from Waterford to Liverpool, Lancashire.

=== 3 March ===
List of shipwrecks: 3 March 1806
Ship	State	Description
Hercules	United States	The ship was driven ashore at Pedro Point. She was on a voyage from Boston, Massachusetts, to the Spanish Main.

=== 4 March ===
List of shipwrecks: 4 March 1806
Ship	State	Description
Columbia	United Kingdom	The ship was driven ashore in Lough Swilly. She was on a voyage from Liverpool, Lancashire, to Jamaica. Columbia was later refloated.
Countess of Chatham	United Kingdom	The ship struck the Runnel Stone and foundered. Her crew were rescued. She was on a voyage from Plymouth to Biddeford, Devon.

=== 7 March ===
List of shipwrecks: 7 March 1806
Ship	State	Description
Farmer	United Kingdom	The ship sprang a leak and foundered in the Bay of Biscay off Cape Finisterre, Spain. Her crew were rescued by HMS Avenger (Royal Navy). Farmer was on a voyage from Portsmouth, Hampshire, to Lisbon, Portugal.

=== 8 March ===
List of shipwrecks: 8 March 1806
Ship	State	Description
Clyde	United Kingdom	The ship ran aground off the Isle of Man. She was on a voyage from Greenock, Renfrewshire to Liverpool, Lancashire. She had been refloated by 13 March with the loss of her rudder. Union (United Kingdom) towed her in to Holyhead, Anglesey on 17 March.

=== 9 March ===
List of shipwrecks: 9 March 1806
Ship	State	Description
Auris	United Kingdom	The brig was wrecked on Swanny Island, in the Pentland Firth. Her crew survived. She was on a voyage from King's Lynn, Norfolk to Liverpool, Lancashire.
John and Margaret	United Kingdom	The whaler was driven ashore near Stromness, Orkney Islands. She was later refloated.
Norfolk	United Kingdom	The whaler was driven ashore near Stromness. She was later refloated.
Providence	United Kingdom	The ship departed from Dundee, Forfarshire, for Grangemouth, Stirlingshire. No further trace, presumed foundered in the North Sea with the loss of all hands.
Sims	United Kingdom	The whaler was driven ashore either at Claistran, Lothian, or near Stromness. Her crew were rescued. Sims was later refloated and taken in to Leith.
Sophy	United Kingdom	The brig foundered in Lough Foyle with the loss of all hands. She was on a voyage from the Clyde to Halifax, Nova Scotia, British North America.

=== 10 March ===
List of shipwrecks: 10 March 1806
Ship	State	Description
Ceres	United Kingdom	Captain Mortimer's ship was driven ashore and damaged at Liverpool, Lancashire. Ceres was later refloated and taken in to Liverpool.
Ceres	United Kingdom	Captain Webber's ship was driven ashore at Liverpool.
Cotton Planter	United Kingdom	The ship was driven ashore at Liverpool. She was later refloated.
Dryade	United Kingdom	The ship was driven ashore at Liverpool.
Eagle	United Kingdom	The ship foundered in the Irish Sea off Dublin. Her crew were rescued. She was on a voyage from Dublin to Belfast, County Antrim.
John Bull	United Kingdom	The ship was driven ashore at Liverpool.
Intrepid	United Kingdom	The ship was driven ashore at Liverpool.
Joseph	United Kingdom	The ship was driven ashore and severely damaged at Liverpool. She was on a voyage from Liverpool to New Orleans, Territory of Orleans. Joseph was later refloated and taken in to Liverpool.
Mary	United Kingdom	The tender was driven ashore at Greenock, Renfrewshire.
Prosperous	United Kingdom	The ship foundered in the Irish Sea off Anglesey with the loss of all hands.
Rosina	United Kingdom	The ship was driven ashore and wrecked at Liverpool. She was on a voyage from Liverpool to New Brunswick, British North America.
Thetis	United Kingdom	The ship was driven ashore at Liverpool. She was later refloated.
Venerable	United Kingdom	The ship was driven ashore and severely damaged at Liverpool. She was on a voyage from Liverpool to Barbados. Venerable was later refloated and taken in to Liverpool.
Woolton	United Kingdom	The ship was driven ashore at Liverpool.

=== 11 March ===
List of shipwrecks: 11 March 1806
Ship	State	Description
Delight	United Kingdom	The ship was driven ashore and wrecked at Saltfleet, Lincolnshire, with the loss of all hands.

=== 12 March ===
List of shipwrecks: 12 March 1806
Ship	State	Description
Eliza	United Kingdom	The brig was abandoned in the Atlantic Ocean. Her crew were rescued by Mercury (United Kingdom). Eliza was on a voyage from Jamaica to Halifax, Nova Scotia.

=== 13 March ===
List of shipwrecks: 13 March 1806
Ship	State	Description
Friends Endeavour	United Kingdom	The brig was wrecked at São Miguel, Azores.
Friendship	United Kingdom	The ship was wrecked at Youghal, County Cork. Her crew were rescued.
Two Generals	United States	The ship was driven ashore at Dover, Kent, United Kingdom. She was on a voyage from Virginia to Hamburg.
Two unnamed vessels	Flags unknown	The brigs were wrecked at São Miguel.
17 unnamed vessels	Flags unknown	The ships were wrecked at Antwerp, Lys and Havre-de-Grâce, Seine-Inférieure, France.

=== 15 March ===
List of shipwrecks: 15 March 1806
Ship	State	Description
Friend's Endeavour	United Kingdom	The brig was lost at São Miguel Island, Azores.

=== 16 March ===
List of shipwrecks: 16 March 1806
Ship	State	Description
Friends	United Kingdom	The collier was driven onto the Spanish Battery Rocks, on the coast fo County Durham.
Swallow	United Kingdom	The ship foundered in the Irish Sea off Wexford. Her crew were rescued. She was on a voyage from Limerick to Liverpool, Lancashire.

=== 17 March ===
List of shipwrecks: 17 March 1806
Ship	State	Description
Experiment	United Kingdom	The ship was driven ashore at Wexford. She was on a voyage from Swansea, Glamorgan, to Dublin.

=== 18 March ===
List of shipwrecks: 18 March 1806
Ship	State	Description
Family	United Kingdom	The ship was wrecked at St. Abb's Head, Berwickshire. She was on a voyage from Norway to Leith, Lothian
Mary	United States	The ship capsized in a squall in the Pacific Ocean (15°30′S 93°30′E). Her crew were rescued from the wreck 68 days later by Bengal (United States).

=== 19 March ===
List of shipwrecks: 19 March 1806
Ship	State	Description
Diana	United Kingdom	The ship struck rocks off Holyhead, Anglesey and sank. Her crew were rescued. She was on a voyage from Teignmouth, Devon, to Liverpool, Lancashire.
Minerva	(United Kingdom of Great Britain and Ireland) British North America	The brig was driven ashore in the Gulf of Mexico.

=== 22 March ===
List of shipwrecks: 22 March 1806
Ship	State	Description
Fly	United Kingdom	The ship was wrecked at Exton, Devon. She was on a voyage from Weymouth, Dorset, to Carmarthen.

=== 23 March ===
List of shipwrecks: 23 March 1806
Ship	State	Description
HMS Tonnant	Royal Navy	The Tonnant-class ship of the line ran aground on the Wainer Bank, in The Solent. She was refloated.

=== 24 March ===
List of shipwrecks: 24 March 1806
Ship	State	Description
Frederick	Prussia	The ship was run down and sunk in the North Sea off Texel, North Holland, Batavian Republic with the loss of all bar her captain. She was on a voyage from Emden to London, United Kingdom.

=== Unknown date ===
List of shipwrecks: Unknown date in March 1806
Ship	State	Description
Aid	United Kingdom	The ship capsized at Gravesend, Kent. She was on a voyage from Boston, Lincolnshire, to London.
Ann	United Kingdom	The sloop was driven ashore at Wells-next-the-Sea, Norfolk. She was on a voyage from Whitby, Yorkshire to Jamaica. Ann was later refloated and put into Newhaven, Sussex.
Ark	United Kingdom	The transport ship was lost at Messina, Sicily.
Bay Packet	United Kingdom	The ship sank near Bridlington, Yorkshire. She was on a voyage from Hull, Yorkshire to Whitby.
Betty	United Kingdom	The ship was driven ashore near Balbriggan, County Dublin. She was on a voyage from Liverpool, Lancashire, to Dublin.
Charlotte Murdock	United States	The ship was driven ashore near Den Helder, North Holland, Batavian Republic.
Cheshire	United Kingdom	The ship was driven ashore in the Studwell Roads, Bristol Channel. She was on a voyage from Cork to Liverpool.
Columbus	Hamburg	The ship ran aground on the Maid Sandbank, off Sheerness, Kent. She was on a voyage from Dover, Kent to Hamburg.
Draxhall	United Kingdom	The ship was driven ashore on the Mile Rocks, near Liverpool. She was on a voyage from Liverpool to Grenada. Draxhall was later refloated and returned to Liverpool.
Eagle	United Kingdom	The ship was driven ashore on the Mile Rocks, near Liverpool. She was on a voyage from Liverpool to Africa. Eagle was later refloated and taken in to Liverpool.
Earl Fauconberg	United Kingdom	The whaler was driven ashore at Aberdeen. She was on a voyage from Grimsby, Lincolnshire, to Greenland. Fauconberg was later refloated and put into Aberdeen for repairs.
Eliza	United Kingdom	The ship was wrecked on the coast of Scotland. Her crew were rescued. She was on a voyage from Demerara to Liverpool.
Enterprize	United Kingdom	The ship was in collision with St. Andrew (United Kingdom). She was beached on Holly Island. Enterprize was on a voyage from the Clyde to Grenada.
Fly	United Kingdom	The ship was lost near Great Yarmouth, Norfolk. She was on a voyage from Whitby to London.
Friendship	United Kingdom	The ship foundered in the North Sea off Harwich, Essex. She was on a voyage from Hull to London.
Gipsey	United Kingdom	The ship was lost near Liverpool. She was on a voyage from Saint Vincent to Liverpool.
Harmony	United Kingdom	The ship was driven ashore and wrecked at Torquay, Devon. She was on a voyage from Dartmouth, Devon, to Newfoundland, British North America.
Hartley	United Kingdom	The ship foundered in the Irish Sea off Holyhead, Anglesey. She was on a voyage from Waterford to Liverpool.
Herman	Bremen	The ship was wrecked on the coast of Jutland. Ten crew were rescued. She was on a voyage from Plymouth, Devon to Bremen.
Hope	United Kingdom	The brig was driven ashore and wrecked at Peterhead, Aberdeenshire.
James	United Kingdom	The ship was driven ashore and wrecked near Sandwich, Kent. She was on a voyage from London to Antigua.
Lexington	United States	The ship was driven ashore at Westerschelling, Friesland, Batavian Republic. She was on a voyage from Baltimore, Maryland, to Rotterdam, South Holland, Batavian Republic. Lexington was later refloated.
Louisa	United Kingdom	The transport ship was lost at Messina.
Molly	United Kingdom	The ship was driven ashore at Ostend, Lys, France. She was on a voyage from Stonehaven, Aberdeenshire to London.
Montrath	United Kingdom	The ship was driven ashore near Brancaster, Norfolk. She was on a voyage from London to King's Lynn, Norfolk
New Century	United Kingdom	The ship ran aground on the Hoyle Bank, in Liverpool Bay. She was on a voyage from Dublin to Liverpool. New Century was later refloated and taken in to Liverpool.
New Syren	United Kingdom	The ship was driven ashore in the River Severn. She was on a voyage from London to Bristol, Gloucestershire.
Oelswig	Spain	The ship was wrecked at Bilbao with the loss of all but three of her crew. She was on a voyage from Bristol, Gloucestershire, United Kingdom to Bilbao.
Olive Branch	United Kingdom	The ship was driven ashore. She was on a voyage from King's Lynn to Chepstow, Monmouthshire.
Prince Carl von Hesson	(Denmark) Danish East India Company	The East Indiaman was wrecked at Arendal, Norway. Her crew were rescued. She was on a voyage from Copenhagen to the Danish East Indies.
Providence	United Kingdom	The ship was driven ashore at Deal, Kent. She was on a voyage from Newry, County Antrim, to London. Providence was later refloated and taken in to Ramsgate.
Rodney	United Kingdom	The ship was driven ashore and damaged at Liverpool. Rodney was later refloated and taken in to Liverpool.
spence	United Kingdom	The ship ran aground on Scharhörn. She was on a voyage from London to Hamburg. She was refloated.
Susannah	United Kingdom	The ship was driven ashore and capsized in the River Avon. She was on a voyage from Bristol to Dublin.
Swift	United Kingdom	The ship was wrecked on the Portuguese coast.
Tartar	(United Kingdom of Great Britain and Ireland) Guernsey	The privateer was discovered crewless off the coast of France by the schooner Charlotte. She was taken in to Falmouth, Cornwall.
Tauris	United Kingdom	The ship was wrecked in the Orkney Islands. Her crew were rescued. She was on a voyage from King's Lynn, Norfolk to Liverpool, Lancashire.
Trusty	United Kingdom	The ship was driven ashore in the Gulf of Mexico. She was on a voyage from Jamaica to Halifax.
Venus	United Kingdom	The ship wrecked at Holyhead. She was on a voyage from Liverpool to Sligo.
Hired armed lugger Venus	Royal Navy	The hired armed lugger foundered off Texel on either 4 or 28 March.
Washington	United States	The ship was driven ashore near Schevening, South Holland, Batavian Republic. Her crew were rescued.
William	United Kingdom	The ship ran aground in Ballyheigh Bay and was wrecked. She was on a voyage from Limerick to Lisbon and St. Ubes, Portugal.

== April ==
=== 1 April ===
List of shipwrecks: 1 April 1806
Ship	State	Description
Doris	United Kingdom	The transport ship was driven ashore in the Elbe. She was refloated on 7 June and taken in to Glückstadt, Duchy of Holstein.
HM Hired armed ship Providence	Royal Navy	The hired armed ship was driven ashore in the Elbe.
Four unnamed vessels	Denmark	The ships were driven ashore and wrecked in the Elbe.
Unnamed vessels	Flags unknown	The ships were driven ashore in the Elbe.

=== 4 April ===
List of shipwrecks: 4 April 1806
Ship	State	Description
Lancaster	United Kingdom	On her way to Liverpool the ship struck on a sunk rock off the Saltee Islands. She had taken on 6 feet (1.8 m) of water in her hold and had to unload before she could proceed.

=== 6 April ===
List of shipwrecks: 6 April 1806
Ship	State	Description
La Malicieuse	French Navy	War of the Fourth Coalition: The corvette was destroyed in the Gironde Estuary in an action with HMS Pallas (Royal Navy).
Two unnamed vessels	French Navy	War of the Fourth Coalition: The corvettes were driven ashore in the Gironde Estuary in an action with HMS Pallas (Royal Navy).
Unnamed	France	War of the Fourth Coalition: The brig was burnt in an action with HMS Pallas (Royal Navy).
Unnamed	France	War of the Fourth Coalition: The chasse-marée was wrecked in an action with HMS Pallas (Royal Navy).

=== 8 April ===
List of shipwrecks: 8 April 1806
Ship	State	Description
Providence	United Kingdom	The ship sprang a leak and was abandoned in the Atlantic Ocean (47°38′N 22°01′W). Her crew were rescued byHMS Nemesis (Royal Navy). Providence was on a voyage from London to Quebec City, Lower Canada, British North America.

=== 9 April ===
List of shipwrecks: 9 April 1806
Ship	State	Description
Jupiter	United Kingdom	War of the Third Coalition: The ship was captured and scuttled by the frigate Camilla (France). Jupiter was on a voyage from London to Lisbon, Portugal.

=== 11 April ===
List of shipwrecks: 11 April 1806
Ship	State	Description
Traveller	United Kingdom	The ship sprang a leak and was abandoned by her crew. She was on a voyage from Liverpool, Lancashire, to New York, United States.

=== 12 April ===
List of shipwrecks: 12 April 1806
Ship	State	Description
Brave	United Kingdom	The Téméraire-class ship of the line foundered whilst on a voyage from the West Indies to the United Kingdom. Her crew were rescued by HMS Donegal (Royal Navy).

=== 13 April ===
List of shipwrecks: 13 April 1806
Ship	State	Description
Providence	United Kingdom	The ship foundered in the North Sea off North Foreland, Kent with the loss of all but one of her crew.

=== 15 April ===
List of shipwrecks: 15 April 1806
Ship	State	Description
HMS Blenheim	Royal Navy	The Sandwich-class ship of the line ran aground in the Strait of Malacca. She was refloated on 19 April.
Lion	United Kingdom	The ship, which had sprung a leak two days before, was driven ashore on the Morant Cays. She was subsequently set afire. Lion was on a voyage from Jamaica to London.

=== 17 April ===
List of shipwrecks: 17 April 1806
Ship	State	Description
Goldthorp	United Kingdom	The ship ran aground on the Middle Sand, in the The Swin. She refloated but then sank. Her crew were rescued.

=== 19 April ===
List of shipwrecks: 19 April 1806
Ship	State	Description
Governor Picton	United Kingdom	The ship was wrecked on the south coast of Trinidad. She was on a voyage from the Clyde to Trinidad.

=== 20 April ===
List of shipwrecks: 20 April 1806
Ship	State	Description
Friends	United Kingdom	The ship was driven ashore and severely damaged at Memel, Prussia. She was on a voyage from Memel to Newry, County Antrim. Friends was later refloated.
Lady Burges	British East India Company	The East Indiaman was wrecked south west of Boa Vista Island, Cape Verde Islands with the loss of 34 of the 184 people on board. Survivors were rescued by Alexander, Asia, Lord Melville, Lord Nelson, Sovereign and Walthamstow (all United Kingdom). Lady Burges was on a voyage from London to Madras and Bengal, India.
Lark	United Kingdom	War of the Third Coalition: The ship was captured and scuttled in the Atlantic Ocean (50°05′N 32°12′W) by Guerrière, Revanche and Sirène (all French Navy). Lark was on a voyage from Dartmouth, Devon, to Newfoundland, British North America.

=== 22 April ===
List of shipwrecks: 22 April 1806
Ship	State	Description
Governor King	(United Kingdom of Great Britain and Ireland) New South Wales	The ship was wrecked at Newcastle. Her crew survived.

=== 23 April ===
List of shipwrecks: 23 April 1806
Ship	State	Description
Cyrus	United States	The ship was wrecked in the Bahamas. She was on a voyage from Havana, Cuba to Philadelphia, Pennsylvania.
Ellis	United Kingdom	The ship was lost whilst on a voyage from Liverpool, Lancashire, to Africa and the West Indies.

=== 27 April ===
List of shipwrecks: 27 April 1806
Ship	State	Description
Beaver	United Kingdom	War of the Third Coalition: The ship was captured and burnt by Topaze (French Navy). Beaver was on a voyage from Waterford to Newfoundland, British North America.

=== 30 April ===
List of shipwrecks: 30 April 1806
Ship	State	Description
Montrose	United Kingdom	War of the Third Coalition: The smack was captured and burnt 200 nautical miles (370 km) west of Land's End, Cornwall by Topaze (French Navy). Montrose was on a voyage from São Miguel Island, Azores to London.

=== Unknown date ===
List of shipwrecks: Unknown date in April 1806
Ship	State	Description
Catherine Elizabeth	United Kingdom	The ship was driven ashore at Blackhouse, Newry, County Antrim. She was on a voyage from Alicante, Spain to Belfast, County Antrim.
Charlotte	United Kingdom	The ship was lost at São Miguel Island, Azores. Her crew were rescued. She was on a voyage from São Miguel to Bristol, Gloucestershire.
Eliza	United Kingdom	The ship foundered whilst on a voyage from Jamaica to Halifax, Nova Scotia, British North America.
Elizabeth	United Kingdom	War of the Third Coalition: The ship was captured and sunk by the French. She was on a voyage from Jersey, Channel Islands to Limerick.
Hamilton	United Kingdom	War of the Third Coalition: The ship was captured, set afire and sunk in the Atlantic Ocean by Topaze (French Navy). She was on a voyage from Dublin to Newfoundland, British North America.
Jonge Catrina	Batavian Republic	The ship was destroyed by fire at Inverkeithing, Fife, United Kingdom.
Kent	United Kingdom	The ship foundered in the North Sea whilst on a voyage from Hull, Yorkshire to Bremen.
Pelham	United Kingdom	The ship was lost at São Miguel Island, Azores.
Rebecca	United Kingdom	The ship foundered in the North Sea off Great Yarmouth, Norfolk. She was on a voyage from Boston, Lincolnshire, to London.
Spence	United Kingdom	The ship ran aground on the Herd Sand, in the North Sea off the coast of County Durham. Her crew were rescued by the South Shields Lifeboat. She was on a voyage from Hamburg to Newcastle upon Tyne, Northumberland. Spence was later refloated.
Westoe	United Kingdom	The ship foundered.

== May ==
=== 2 May ===
List of shipwrecks: 2 May 1806
Ship	State	Description
Rising Sun	United States	The ship ran aground off Bermuda. She was later refloated and put into Ely Harbour. Rising Sun was on a voyage from Rhode Island to Barbados. She was refloated and taken in to Ely Harbour.

=== 4 May ===
List of shipwrecks: 4 May 1806
Ship	State	Description
Minerva (Минерва)	Imperial Russian Navy	The transport ship ran aground in the Baltic Sea. Her crew and cargo were rescued and the stranded ship was subsequently sold off. She was on a voyage from Copenhagen to Kronstadt.

=== 5 May ===
List of shipwrecks: 5 May 1806
Ship	State	Description
John Bull	United Kingdom	The ship was driven ashore and wrecked at Happisburgh, Norfolk. She was on a voyage from Great Yarmouth to Hull, Yorkshire.

=== 7 May ===
List of shipwrecks: 7 May 1806
Ship	State	Description
Mercurius	United Kingdom	The ship lost her rudder and was abandoned.

=== 9 May ===
List of shipwrecks: 9 May 1806
Ship	State	Description
Elizabeth	United Kingdom	The ship was lost near Louisbourg, Nova Scotia, British North America. Her crew were rescued. She was on a voyage from Halifax, Nova Scotia, to Quebec City, Lower Canada.

=== 10 May ===
List of shipwrecks: 10 May 1806
Ship	State	Description
Swan	United Kingdom	The ship was lost near Charleston, South Carolina, United States. She was on a voyage from the Gold Coast to Charleston.

=== 12 May ===
List of shipwrecks: 12 May 1806
Ship	State	Description
Irvine	United Kingdom	The ship was lost off St. John's, Newfoundland, British North America with the loss of five of her crew.

=== 17 May ===
List of shipwrecks: 17 May 1806
Ship	State	Description
Carolina Henrietta	Prussia	The ship was driven ashore in the Eyder. She was later refloated.

=== 20 May ===
List of shipwrecks: 20 May 1806
Ship	State	Description
Intrepid	United Kingdom	The ship was driven ashore at Demerara. She was on a voyage from Demerara to Liverpool, Lancashire.
Lilly	United States	The sloop was wrecked on the Kentish Knock, in the Thames Estuary. All eleven crew survived.
Sydney	British East India Company	The East Indiaman was driven ashore and wrecked on New Guinea. Her crew survived.

=== 22 May ===
List of shipwrecks: 22 May 1806
Ship	State	Description
Union	United Kingdom	The brig was wrecked on the Galloper Sand, in the North Sea.
Unnamed	Flag unknown	The brig was wrecked on the Galloper Sand with the loss of all hands.

=== 23 May ===
List of shipwrecks: 23 May 1806
Ship	State	Description
Ann	United Kingdom	The transport ship was driven ashore on St. Nicholas Island, Devon. She was refloated and taken in to Plymouth Sound.

=== 24 May ===
List of shipwrecks: 24 May 1806
Ship	State	Description
HMS Berbice	Royal Navy	The schooner foundered off Demerara. Her crew survived.

=== Unknown date ===
List of shipwrecks: Unknown date in May 1806
Ship	State	Description
HMS Arethusa	Royal Navy	The Minerva-class frigate ran aground on the Coloradoes. She was refloated and taken in to Port Royal, Jamaica.
Industry	United Kingdom	The ship foundered in the Atlantic Ocean. She was on a voyage from Poole, Dorset to Newfoundland, British North America.
Jane	United Kingdom	The ship was driven ashore near Wexford. She was on a voyage from Workington, Cumberland, to Cork.
John	United Kingdom	The ship ran aground on the Falsterbo Reef, in the Baltic Sea. She was on a voyage from Liverpool, Lancashire, to saint Petersburg, Russia.
Maria	United Kingdom	The ship was driven ashore at Lurgan Green, near Dundalk, County Louth.
Welwart	Prussia	The galiot was driven ashore and severely damaged in the Cattewater.
William	United Kingdom	The ship was captured by the privateer Guernsey ( (United Kingdom of Great Britain and Ireland) Guernsey). She was subsequently wrecked on St. Martin's Point, Guernsey, Channel Islands. Her crew were rescuesd. William was on a voyage from Tenerife, Canary Islands, to London.

== June ==
=== 4 June ===
List of shipwrecks: 4 June 1806
Ship	State	Description
Hope	United Kingdom	The sloop was lost on the Mixon Sands, in the Bristol Channel with the loss of all hands.

=== 6 June ===
List of shipwrecks: 6 June 1806
Ship	State	Description
Pomona	Kingdom of Sicily	The ship was destroyed by fire at Gibraltar.

=== 10 June ===
List of shipwrecks: 10 June 1806
Ship	State	Description
Sisters	United Kingdom	The brig sank at Sunderland, County Durham.

=== 11 June ===
List of shipwrecks: 11 June 1806
Ship	State	Description
John & Henry	United Kingdom	The ship was wrecked on the coast of Africa. She was on a voyage from Liverpool, Lancashire, to Africa.

=== 13 June ===
List of shipwrecks: 13 June 1806
Ship	State	Description
James and Margaret	United Kingdom	The ship was driven ashore on the coast of Norway.

=== 14 June ===
List of shipwrecks: 14 June 1806
Ship	State	Description
Lark	United Kingdom	War of the Third Coalition: Guerrière, Revanche, and Sirène (all French Navy) captured and scuttled Lark. Lark was on a voyage from Dartmouth, Devon, to Newfoundland, British North America.
Ruth	United Kingdom	War of the Third Coalition: The ship was captured in the Atlantic Ocean (50°05′N 32°12′W) by Guerrière, Revanche and Sirène (all French Navy) on 20 April. She was sent in to São Miguel Island, Azores, arriving on 25 May and was wrecked there on this date.

=== 16 June ===
List of shipwrecks: 16 June 1806
Ship	State	Description
Dundas	United Kingdom	War of the Third Coalition: The ship was captured off Cork and burnt by four French frigates. She was on a voyage from Jamaica to Cork.
Elizabeth and Ann	United Kingdom	The ship foundered in the Atlantic Ocean north west of the Shetland Islands. She was on a voyage from Norway to Ireland.
Nile	United Kingdom	War of the Third Coalition: The ship was captured and burnt off Cork by four French frigates. She was on a voyage from Jamaica to Bristol, Gloucestershire.

=== 17 June ===
List of shipwrecks: 17 June 1806
Ship	State	Description
Trepassey	United Kingdom	The whaler was captured by the French Navy whilst on a voyage from Newfoundland, British North America to Barbados. She was plundered and set afire. Her crew were taken to Martinique.

=== 21 June ===
List of shipwrecks: 21 June 1806
Ship	State	Description
Montgomery	United Kingdom	The ship was wrecked at Grenada. She was on a voyage from Demerara to Liverpool, Lancashire.

=== 28 June ===
List of shipwrecks: 28 June 1806
Ship	State	Description
Plato	United States	The ship was wrecked near the Cordouan Lighthouse, Gironde, France. She was on a voyage from New York to Bordeaux, Gironde.
Unnamed	United Kingdom	War of the Third Coalition: The 20-gun ship was captured and burnt by the French in the Atlantic Ocean (49°20′N 15°00′W).

=== 29 June ===
List of shipwrecks: 29 June 1806
Ship	State	Description
Bee	(United Kingdom of Great Britain and Ireland) New South Wales	The sloop was driven offshore from Newcastle, New South Wales. Her captain died on 16 July, whilst the surviving crew member was rescued two days later by Brothers ( (United Kingdom of Great Britain and Ireland) New South Wales). Bee was left adrift and was not seen again.

=== 30 June ===
List of shipwrecks: 30 June 1806
Ship	State	Description
Sims	United Kingdom	War of the Third Coalition: The ship was captured off Greenland by Guerrière, Revanche and Sirène (all French Navy). She was burnt on 12 July.

=== Unknown date ===
List of shipwrecks: Unknown date in June 1806
Ship	State	Description
Charlotte	United Kingdom	The ship was driven ashore in the Eyder.
Diana	United Kingdom	The ship was driven ashore at Dragør, Denmark. She was later refloated and put into Copenhagen. Diana was on a voyage from Riga, Russia to Aberdeen.
James & Kitty	United Kingdom	The ship was driven ashore near Galway. She was on a voyage from Galway to Bristol, Gloucestershire.
Juno	United Kingdom	The ship collided with HMS Atlas (Royal Navy) at Jamaica. She was on a voyage from Jamaica to the Clyde. Juno was consequently condemned.
Neptune	United States	The ship ran aground off Boulogne, Pas-de-Calais, France. She was on a voyage from Charleston, South Carolina, to Hamburg.
Otter	United Kingdom	The ship was driven ashore on the coast of Norway. She was on a voyage from Saint Petersburg, Russia to London.

== July ==
=== 7 July ===
List of shipwrecks: 7 July 1806
Ship	State	Description
Gloire	United Kingdom	The ship was abandoned. She was on a voyage from Jamaica to Bristol, Gloucestershire.
Will	United Kingdom	The ship capsized in a squall. She was on a voyage from Kingston, Jamaica, to Liverpool, Lancashire.

=== 9 July ===
List of shipwrecks: 9 July 1806
Ship	State	Description
Jane and Sarah	United Kingdom	The ship foundered in the North Sea off the Dudgeon Lightship ( Trinity House). Her crew were rescued.

=== 11 July ===
List of shipwrecks: 12 July 1806
Ship	State	Description
William	United Kingdom	The ship was struck by lightning in the English Channel off Selsey Bill, Sussex and was abandoned by her crew. She was on a voyage from London to Jamaica.

=== 12 July ===
List of shipwrecks: 12 July 1806
Ship	State	Description
Brisset	United Kingdom	War of the Third Coalition: The ship was captured off Greenland and burnt by Guerrière (French Navy).
Einigheit	Sweden	War of the Third Coalition: The brig was captured off Greenland and burnt by Guerrière (French Navy).

=== 13 July ===
List of shipwrecks: 13 July 1806
Ship	State	Description
Tellicherry	United Kingdom	The ship was wrecked in the Mindoro Strait. Her crew survived.

=== 15 July ===
List of shipwrecks: 15 July 1806
Ship	State	Description
Niger	United Kingdom	The ship was driven ashore at "Toreico". She was on a voyage from South Shields, County Durham, to Saint Petersburg, Russia.

=== 16 July ===
List of shipwrecks: 16 July 1806
Ship	State	Description
Washington	Bremen	The ship was lost near Kirkwall, Orkney Islands, United Kingdom. She was on a voyage from Limerick, United Kingdom to Bremen.

=== 18 July ===
List of shipwrecks: 18 July 1806
Ship	State	Description
Doncaster	United Kingdom	The ship caught fire and was severely damaged at Portsmouth, Hampshire.

=== 20 July ===
List of shipwrecks: 20 July 1806
Ship	State	Description
Rodman	United States	The ship was driven ashore in the Elbe.

=== 26 July ===
List of shipwrecks: 26 July 1806
Ship	State	Description
Vulcan	United Kingdom	The ship was wrecked on the Barebush Keys, off Jamaica.
Unnamed	United States	The ship was wrecked at Rattray Head, Aberdeenshire, United Kingdom. Her crew were rescued.

=== 27 July ===
List of shipwrecks: 27 July 1806
Ship	State	Description
Eagle	United States	The ship was wrecked in the Caicos Islands. She was on a voyage from Boston, Massachusetts, to Jamaica.

=== 28 July ===
List of shipwrecks: 28 July 1806
Ship	State	Description
Svyatoy Iakov (Святой Иаков, 'St. Jacob')	Imperial Russian Navy	The galiot ran aground at Letipea in the Gulf of Finland, and was driven ashore and wrecked during a refloating attempt on 31 July. Her crew and cargo were rescued. She was on a voyage from Narva to Reval.

=== 31 July ===
List of shipwrecks: 31 July 1806
Ship	State	Description
Hope	United Kingdom	The ship was lost near Wexford. She was on a voyage from Penzance, Cornwall, to Dublin.

=== Unknown date ===
List of shipwrecks: Unknown date in July 1806
Ship	State	Description
Ann	United Kingdom	The ship was wrecked on The Manacles. Her crew were rescued. She was on a voyage from Swansea, Glamorgan, to Falmouth, Cornwall.
Boyne	United Kingdom	War of the Third Coalition: The ship was captured and burnt by Guerrière (French Navy). She was on a voyage from Great Yarmouth, Norfolk, to Arkhangelsk Russia.
Dingwall	United Kingdom	War of the Third Coalition: The ship was captured and burnt by Guerrière (French Navy). She was on a voyage from London to Newfoundland, British North America.
Eliza	United Kingdom	The ship was lost near Peterhead, Aberdeenshire. She was on a voyage from Pictou, Nova Scotia, British North America to London.
Firm	Portugal	The ship ran aground on the Goodwin Sands, Kent, United Kingdom and was abandoned by her crew. She was later refloated and taken in to Ramsgate, Kent. Firm was on a voyage from Porto to Saint Petersburg, Russia.
Hannah	United Kingdom	The ship was driven ashore in Bootle Bay. She was on a voyage from Liverpool, Lancashire, to Jamaica. Hannah was later refloated and taken in to Liverpool for repairs.
Mary Ann	United Kingdom	The ship was driven ashore on Tobago.
Mercury	United Kingdom	The ship departed from Portsmouth, Hampshire, for New Providence. No further trace, presumed foundered with the loss of all hands.
Patsey	United Kingdom	The ship was wrecked near Tenby, Pembrokeshire. She was on a voyage from Bristol, Gloucestershire, to Londonderry.
Plenty	United Kingdom	The ship foundered in the Irish Sea whilst on a voyage from Kidwelly, Carmarthenshire, to Cork.
Vrow Rebecca	Prussia	The ship was driven ashore and wrecked on Scharhörn. Her crew were rescued.
Will	United Kingdom	The full-rigged ship foundered with the loss of four lives during squall while on a voyage from Kingston, Jamaica, to Liverpool, England.
William	United Kingdom	War of the Third Coalition: The ship was captured and burnt by Guerrière (French Navy). She was on a voyage from Greenock, Renfrewshire, to Newfoundland.
Unnamed	(Denmark) Duchy of Schleswig	The ship was lost near Cuxhaven, Kingdom of Hanover. She was on a voyage from Tönningen to London.

== August ==
=== 1 August ===
List of shipwrecks: 2 August 1806
Ship	State	Description
HMS Guerriere	Royal Navy	The fifth rate ran aground in the River Medway. She was on a voyage from Sheerness to Chatham, Kent. She was refloated.

=== 2 August ===
List of shipwrecks: 2 August 1806
Ship	State	Description
Blenheim	United Kingdom	War of the Third Coalition: The ship was captured off Greenland by Revanche and Sirène (both French Navy). She was set afire and sunk.
Holderness	United Kingdom	War of the Third Coalition: The ship was captured off Greenland by Revanche and Sirène (both French Navy). She was set afire and sunk.

=== 4 August ===
List of shipwrecks: 4 August 1806
Ship	State	Description
Hope	United States	The ship sprang a leak in the Atlantic Ocean (43°42′N 42°00′W) and was abandoned by her crew. HMS Surveillante (Royal Navy) rescued the crew.

=== 6 August ===
List of shipwrecks: 6 August 1806
Ship	State	Description
Hope	United Kingdom	The brig was wrecked on a reef 10 leagues (30 nautical miles (56 km) off Dublin). Her crew were rescued. She was on a voyage from Porto, Portugal to Dublin.

=== 8 August ===
List of shipwrecks: 8 August 1806
Ship	State	Description
Four Sisters	United Kingdom	The ship was run down and sunk in the North Sea off the mouth of the Tees by Fanny (United Kingdom). Her crew were rescued.

=== 10 August ===
List of shipwrecks: 10 August 1806
Ship	State	Description
Earl of Elgin	United Kingdom	The sloop was severely damaged by fire at Sunderland, County Durham.
Williamson	United Kingdom	War of the Third Coalition: The ship was captured by Revanche andSirène (both French Navy and was presumed to have been destroyed by them. Williamson was on a voyage from London to Quebec City, Lower Canada, British North America.

=== 14 August ===
List of shipwrecks: 14 August 1806
Ship	State	Description
Hebe	United Kingdom	War of the Third Coalition: The ship was captured and sunk by Valeureuse (French Navy. She was on a voyage from Trinidad to Bermuda.

=== 16 August ===
List of shipwrecks: 16 August 1806
Ship	State	Description
Alexander	United Kingdom	War of the Third Coalition: The ship was captured and burnt by Veteran (French Navy). She was on a voyage from Quebec City, Lower Canada, British North America to Belfast, County Antrim.
Esther	United Kingdom	War of the Third Coalition: The ship was captured and burnt by Veteran (French Navy). She was on a voyage from Quebec City to Liverpool, Lancashire.
Janus	United Kingdom	War of the Third Coalition: The ship was captured and burnt by Veteran (French Navy). She was on a voyage from Quebec City to Portsmouth, Hampshire.
John and Isabella	United Kingdom	War of the Third Coalition: The ship was captured and burnt by Veteran (French Navy). She was on a voyage from Quebec City to London.
Lydia	United Kingdom	War of the Third Coalition: The ship was captured and burnt by Veteran (French Navy). She was on a voyage from Quebec City to London.
Silver Eel	United Kingdom	War of the Third Coalition: The ship was captured and burnt by Veteran (French Navy). She was on a voyage from Quebec City to London.

=== 20 August ===
List of shipwrecks: 20 August 1806
Ship	State	Description
Brothers	United Kingdom	War of the Third Coalition: The ship was captured in the Atlantic Ocean (36°44′N 73°00′W) by Régulus (French Navy) whilst on a voyage from Virginia, United States to Whitehaven, Cumberland. She was set afire and sunk. Also reported as 29 August.
Duckworth	United Kingdom	War of the Third Coalition: The ship was captured by two French Navy frigates whilst on a voyage from Limerick to Greenock, Renfrewshire. She was set afire and sunk.

=== 21 August ===
List of shipwrecks: 21 August 1806
Ship	State	Description
Exeter	United Kingdom	1806 Great Coastal hurricane: The ship foundered in the Atlantic Ocean during a hurricane with the loss of all but two of her crew. She was on a voyage from Jamaica to London.
Nutwell	United Kingdom	1806 Great Coastal hurricane: The ship capsized in the Atlantic Ocean during a hurricane. Her crew were rescued on 27 August by an American schooner. She was on a voyage from Jamaica to London.

=== 22 August ===
List of shipwrecks: 22 August 1806
Ship	State	Description
Arctic	United Kingdom	1806 Great Coastal hurricane: The ship was driven ashore at Charleston, South Carolina, United States.
Cumberland	United Kingdom	1806 Great Coastal hurricane: The ship foundered in the Atlantic Ocean during a hurricane. Twelve of her passengers and crew were rescued by an American vessel. She was on a voyage from Jamaica to Leith, Lothian.
Halcyon	United Kingdom	1806 Great Coastal hurricane: The ship was driven ashore at Charleston.
Hercules	United Kingdom	1806 Great Coastal hurricane: The ship foundered in the Atlantic Ocean with the loss of three of her crew. She was on a voyage from Jamaica to London.
Hope	United Kingdom	1806 Great Coastal hurricane: The ship was driven ashore at Charleston.
Nancy	United Kingdom	1806 Great Coastal hurricane: The ship foundered in the Atlantic Ocean in a hurricane. Her crew were rescued by Sally (United Kingdom).
Sally	United Kingdom	1806 Great Coastal hurricane: The ship was abandoned by her crew in the Atlantic Ocean during a hurricane. All on board were rescued by HMS Snake (Royal Navy). Sally was later discovered still afloat.

=== 23 August ===
List of shipwrecks: 23 August 1806
Ship	State	Description
Erin	United Kingdom	1806 Great Coastal hurricane: The ship foundered in the Atlantic Ocean during a hurricane with the loss of all hands.
Herculean	United Kingdom	1806 Great Coastal hurricane: The ship foundered in the Atlantic Ocean during a hurricane with the loss of three of her 25 crewmen.

=== 24 August ===
List of shipwrecks: 24 August 1806
Ship	State	Description
Coverdale	United Kingdom	1806 Great Coastal hurricane: The ship was dismasted in the Atlantic Ocean during a hurricane. She was abandoned and set afire by her crew, nine of whom were rescued by Union, others by Larkin (both United Kingdom).
Mary	United Kingdom	1806 Great Coast hurricane: The schooner foundered in the Atlantic Ocean during a hurricane with the loss of all but two of her crew. She was on a voyage from Curaçao, Curaçao and Dependencies to Greenock, Renfrewshire.

=== 25 August ===
List of shipwrecks: 25 August 1806
Ship	State	Description
Britannia	United Kingdom	The whaler was wrecked on a reef 297 nautical miles (550 km; 342 mi) east of the Clarence River, New South Wales, Australia, with the loss of eight of her 24 crew.

=== 27 August ===
List of shipwrecks: 27 August 1806
Ship	State	Description
Columbia	United States	The ship foundered in the Atlantic Ocean. She was on a voyage from Wilmington, Delaware, to Bristol, Gloucestershire, United Kingdom.
Kirkham	United States	The ship foundered in the Atlantic Ocean. She was on a voyage from Wilmington, Delaware to Bristol.
Leopard	United States	The brig foundered whilst on a voyage from Rotterdam, South Holland, Kingdom of Holland to New York. Her crew were rescued.

=== 29 August ===
List of shipwrecks: 29 August 1806
Ship	State	Description
Unnamed	United Kingdom	The brig was wrecked on The Skerries with the loss of her captain.

=== 31 August ===
List of shipwrecks: 31 August 1806
Ship	State	Description
Diana	Flag unknown	The ship was driven ashore in the Eyder.

=== Unknown date ===
List of shipwrecks: Unknown date in August 1806
Ship	State	Description
Achilles	United Kingdom	1806 Great Coastal hurricane: The ship foundered in the Atlantic Ocean during a hurricane sometime between 21 and 23 August. Her fourteen crew were rescued.
Active	United Kingdom	War of the Third Coalition: The ship was captured and burnt by Veteran (French Navy) before 16 August. She was on a voyage from Antigua to Dublin.
Adolphus	United States	1806 Great Coastal hurricane: The ship foundered in the Atlantic Ocean off the Bogue Banks, North Carolina.
Africaine	United Kingdom	1806 Great Coastal hurricane: The ship foundered in the Atlantic Ocean during a hurricane sometime between 21 and 23 August with the loss of nine of her twenty crew.
Aim	United Kingdom	1806 Great Coastal hurricane: The ship foundered in the Atlantic Ocean during a hurricane sometime between 21 and 23 August. Her crew were rescued.
Ann	(United Kingdom of Great Britain and Ireland) Bermuda	1806 Great Coastal hurricane: The ship foundered in the Atlantic Ocean during a hurricane sometime between 21 and 23 August. Her eleven crew were rescued. She was on a voyage from Jamaica to London.
Atlantic	United Kingdom	1806 Great Coastal hurricane: The ship foundered in the Atlantic Ocean off the Bogue Banks.
Castro Marine	Portugal	The ship was wrecked near Cádiz, Spain. Her crew were rescued. She was on a voyage from Lisbon to Gibraltar.
Cora	United Kingdom	1806 Great Coastal hurricane: Her crew abandoned their ship in the Atlantic Ocean during a hurricane sometime between 21 and 23 August. She was later discovered still afloat by Ceres (United States) and taken in to Philadelphia, Pennsylvania, United States.
Coverdale	United Kingdom	1806 Great Coastal hurriance: The ship was abandoned and set afire in the Atlantic Ocean during a hurricane sometime between 21 and 23 August. Her 25 crew were rescued; nine of them by Union (United Kingdom). Coverdale was on a voyage from Jamaica to London.
HMS Dover	Royal Navy	The fifth-rate was destroyed by fire in the River Thames at Woolwich, Kent.
Exeter	United Kingdom	1806 Great Coastal hurricane: The ship foundered in the Atlantic Ocean during a hurricane sometime between 21 and 23 August with the loss of nineteen of her 22 crew.
Erin	United Kingdom	1806 Great Coastal hurricane: The ship foundered in the Atlantic Ocean during a hurricane sometime between 21 and 23 August with the loss of all eighteen crew.
Frances	United Kingdom	1806 Great Coastal hurricane: The ship foundered in the Atlantic Ocean during a hurricane sometime between 21 and 23 August. Her crew were rescued.
Forty-Second	United Kingdom	1806 Great Coastal hurricane: The ship foundered in the Atlantic Ocean during a hurricane sometime between 21 and 23 August with the loss of all but one of her twelve crew.
Four Sisters	United Kingdom	The ship was run down and sunk in the North Sea by a collier. Her crew were rescued. She was on a voyage from Sunderland, County Durham, to Harwich, Essex.
Francis	United Kingdom	1806 Great Coastal hurricane: The ship foundered between 21 and 23 August. All sixteen people on board were rescued. Five crew were rescued by Nautilus and six people were rescued by Hibernia (United Kingdom). Francis was on a voyage from Jamaica to London.
USRC Governor Williams	United States Revenue-Marine	1806 Great Coastal hurricane: The cutter was driven ashore at Bald Head Island, North Carolina. Subsequently refloated, repaired and returned to service.
Herculanean	United Kingdom	1806 Great Coastal hurricane: The ship foundered in the Atlantic Ocean during a hurricane sometime between 21 and 23 August. Twenty-two of her 25 crew were rescued.
Hilton	United Kingdom	War of the Third Coalition: The ship was captured and burnt by Veteran (French Navy). She was on a voyage from Newfoundland to Porto. Portugal.
Hope	United Kingdom	1806 Great Coastal hurricane: The ship foundered in the Atlantic Ocean. Her crew were rescued by Father and Sons (United Kingdom).
Kirkham	United Kingdom	1806 Great Coastal hurricane: The ship foundered in the Atlantic Ocean. She was on a voyage from Wilmington, Delaware, to Bristol, Gloucestershire.
Lilly	United Kingdom	The ship was driven ashore at Dunfanaghy, County Donegal. She was on a voyage from Jamaica to the Clyde.
Mathew	United Kingdom	The ship foundered in the Queen's Channel, off Margate, Kent. She was on a voyage from Jamaica to London. Mathew was later refloated and beached on the Girdler Sandbank.
HMS Martin	United Kingdom	The sloop disappeared in the North Atlantic while sailing to Barbados.
Nutwell	United Kingdom	1806 Great Coastal hurricane: The ship foundered in the Atlantic Ocean during a hurricane sometime between 21 and 23 August. Her 29 crew were rescued.
Pallas	United Kingdom	1806 Great Coastal hurricane: The brig foundered in the Atlantic Ocean during a hurricane sometime between 21 and 23 August with the loss of all but one of her twelve crew.
Pandora	United Kingdom	War of the Third Coalition / 1806 Great Coastal hurricane: The ship, which had been captured and recaptured and sent in to Nassau, Bahamas, was driven ashore and wrecked in a hurricane. She was on a voyage from Jamaica to London.
Peace	United Kingdom	1806 Great Coastal hurricane: The ship foundered whilst on a voyage from Mogadore, Morocco to London.
Rashleigh	United Kingdom	1806 Great Coastal hurricane: The ship foundered in the Atlantic Ocean during a hurricane sometime between 21 and 23 August. Her eleven crew were rescued.
Rose-in-Bloom	United States	Rose-in-Bloom. 1806 Great Coastal hurricane: The ship capsized in the Atlantic Ocean with the loss of 21 lives. survivors were rescued by the brig Swift (United Kingdom).
Success	United States	The ship was captured and sunk by HMS Veteran (Royal Navy). She was on a voyage from Porto, Portugal to New Providence, New Jersey.
Union	Flag unknown	The ship was driven ashore near Rotterdam, South Holland, Kingdom of Holland.

== September ==
=== 2 September ===
List of shipwrecks: 2 September 1806
Ship	State	Description
Messenger	United States	The schooner capsized in a gale with some loss of life.

=== 3 September ===
List of shipwrecks: 3 September 1806
Ship	State	Description
Backhouse	United Kingdom	The ship sprang a leak whilst on a voyage from Demerara to London. She was set afire and abandoned. Her crew were rescued.
Intrepid	United Kingdom	The ship was wrecked on the North Bull, in the Irish Sea off the coast of County Dublin. Her crew were rescued. She was on a voyage from Liverpool, Lancashire, to Dublin.

=== 4 September ===
List of shipwrecks: 4 September 1806
Ship	State	Description
HMS Wolf	Royal Navy	The brig-sloop was wrecked on a reef east of Heneaga. Her crew were rescued by the sloop Hope ( Denmark-Norway).

=== 5 September ===
List of shipwrecks: 5 September 1806
Ship	State	Description
Sarah	United Kingdom	War of the Third Coalition: The ship was captured and burnt by Revanche and Sirène (both French Navy). She was on a voyage from Quebec City, Lower Canada, British North America to London.
Unnamed	United Kingdom	War of the Third Coalition: The ship was captured and burnt 45 leagues (120 nmi; 220 km) east by south of the Cape of Good Hope, Cape Colony by a French Navy ship.

=== 6 September ===
List of shipwrecks: 6 September 1806
Ship	State	Description
Cato	(United States) Territory of Orleans	The ship sprang a leak in the Atlantic Ocean 60 nautical miles (110 km) off Charleston, South Carolina, United States and was abandoned by her crew. She was on a voyage from New Orleans to Bordeaux, Basses-Pyrénées, France.
Pomona	United Kingdom	The ship was destroyed by fire at Gibraltar. She was on a voyage from Messina, Sicily to an English port.

=== 7 September ===
List of shipwrecks: 7 September 1806
Ship	State	Description
Vreede	Duchy of Holstein	The ship departed Plymouth, Devon, United Kingdom for Tönning. No further trace, presumed foundered with the loss of all hands.

=== 9 September ===
List of shipwrecks: 9 September 1806
Ship	State	Description
Charlotte	United Kingdom	The ship was driven ashore and wrecked at Brancaster, Norfolk, with the loss of two of her crew.
HMS Constance	Royal Navy	War of the Third Coalition: The sixth rate sloop of war was driven ashore and wrecked at Saint-Malo, Ille-et-Vilaine, France following battle damaged received from Salamander (French Navy).
Dorothy and Jane	United Kingdom	The brig sprang a leak and foundered in the North Sea off Wells-next-the-Sea, Norfolk with the loss of a crew member.
Jane and Sarah	United Kingdom	The ship foundered in the North Sea off the Dudgeon Bank. Her crew were rescued.
Lynn Packet	United Kingdom	The ship sank at King's Lynn, Norfolk.
Salamander	French Navy	War of the Third Coalition: The frigate was driven ashore at Saint-Malo following a battle with HM Hired armed cutter Britannia, HMS Constance, HMS Sheldrake and HMS Strenuous (all Royal Navy). She was refloated but sank due to battle damage received.
11 unnamed vessels	Flags unknown	The ships were driven ashore and wrecked in a hurricane at Roseau, Dominica.
17 unnamed vessels	Flags unknown	The ships were driven ashore in a hurricane at Martinique. Fifteen of them were wrecked.
Many unnamed vessels	Flags unknown	The ships were driven ashore in a hurricane at Guadeloupe and were wrecked.

=== 12 September ===
List of shipwrecks: 12 September 1806
Ship	State	Description
Adventure	United Kingdom	The sloop was wrecked at Saltwick, Yorkshire.

=== 13 September ===
List of shipwrecks: 13 September 1806
Ship	State	Description
Polly	United States	The ship was wrecked on Crooked Island, Bahamas. She was on a voyage from Jamaica to Wilmington, Delaware.
Speedwell	United Kingdom	The ship was wrecked at Crooked Island in a hurricane. Her crew were rescued.
Svyatoy Nikolay (Святой Николай, 'St. Nicholas')	Imperial Russian Navy	The galiot ran aground at Letipea in the Gulf of Finland. She was refloated on 25 September with assistance from Konstantin (Imperial Russian Navy), but broke up in a storm on 28 September. She was on a voyage from Narva to Reval. (Note: Chernyshev splits this into two seemingly separate incidents, one involving Svyatoy Nikolay running aground and later breaking up, and another her refloating with the help of Konstantin.) See also: § 27 September
Washington	United States	The ship was captured off Cape Français, Hispaniola by a French privateer. She was on a voyage from Alexandria, Virginia, to Jamaica. Washington was subsequently wrecked in the Caicos Islands.

=== 14 September ===
List of shipwrecks: 14 September 1806
Ship	State	Description
Impétueux	French Navy	The Téméraire-class ship of the line was driven ashore in Chesapeake Bay by HMS Belleisle, HMS Bellona and HMS Melampus (all Royal Navy). She was captured and set afire by the British.
King George	United Kingdom	The packet ship was wrecked on the Salisbury Sandbank, in Liverpool Bay, with the loss of 125 lives. There were six survivors. She was on a voyage from Parkgate, Cheshire to Dublin.
Mary and Elizabeth	United Kingdom	The ship ran aground on the Holme Sand, in the River Humber and capsized.
Phœnix	United Kingdom	The ship foundered in the North Sea off Whitby, Yorkshire. Her crew were rescued. She was on a voyage from Newcastle-upon-Tyne, Northumberland to London.
Tippoo Saib	United States	The ship foundered in the River Mersey.

=== 15 September ===
List of shipwrecks: 15 September 1806
Ship	State	Description
Happy Return	United Kingdom	The ship foundered in the North Sea. She was on a voyage from Hull, Yorkshire to Scarborough, Yorkshire.
Isaac	United States	The ship was wrecked on Heneaga. She was on a voyage from Philadelphia, Pennsylvania, to Jamaica.
Mines Royal	United Kingdom	The brig was wrecked on The Manacles. Her crew were rescued. She was on a voyage from London to Falmouth, Cornwall.
No. 7	Imperial Russian Navy	Russo-Persian War: The galiot sprang a leak and was wrecked in beaching at Lankaran, Talysh Khanate. Her crew were rescued.

=== 18 September ===
List of shipwrecks: 18 September 1806
Ship	State	Description
Concord	United Kingdom	War of the Third Coalition: The ship was captured by Régulus (French Navy). Presumed destroyed by her. She was on a voyage from Jamaica to London.

=== 26 September ===
List of shipwrecks: 26 September 1806
Ship	State	Description
Svyatoy Ioann (Святой Иоанн, 'St. John')	Imperial Russian Navy	The galiot was driven ashore and wrecked at Narva.

=== 27 September ===
List of shipwrecks: 27 September 1806
Ship	State	Description
Konstantin (Константин)	Imperial Russian Navy	The transport ship was driven ashore at Mahu in the Gulf of Finland. Her crew survived. She had been sent from Narva to help refloat Svyatoy Nikolay (Imperial Russian Navy). There was an unsuccessful attempt to refloat her the following spring. See also: § 13 September

=== 30 September ===
List of shipwrecks: 30 September 1806
Ship	State	Description
Bolton	United Kingdom	The ship was destroyed by an explosion at Bonny, Africa.

=== Unknown date ===
List of shipwrecks: Unknown date in September 1806
Ship	State	Description
Agenoria	United Kingdom	War of the Third Coalition: The ship was captured and burnt off the coast of Portugal. She was on a voyage from Newfoundland, British North America to Porto, Portugal.
Ann	United Kingdom	The ship was abandoned in the Atlantic Ocean. Her crew were rescued by Hamilton Moore (United States). Ann was on a voyage from Halifax, Nova Scotia, British North America to Nevis.
Barbadoes Packet	United Kingdom	The ship was driven ashore near Holyhead, Anglesey. She was on a voyage from Berbice to Liverpool, Lancashire.
Bellona	United Kingdom	The transport ship was driven ashore and damaged at Plymouth, Devon.
Castor	French Navy	The ship foundered in the Atlantic Ocean.
Ceres	(United Kingdom of Great Britain and Ireland) Jersey	The ship was driven ashore near Riga, Russia. She was on a voyage from Riga to Jersey.
Experiment	United States	The schooner was abandoned at sea. She was on a voyage from Baltimore, Maryland, to the West Indies.
HMS Flight	Royal Navy	The advice boat disappeared in the English Channel with the loss of all hands.
Friendship	United Kingdom	The ship was driven ashore at Blackwall, Middlesex. She was on a voyage from Jamaica to London. She was refloated and completed her voyage.
Hunter	United Kingdom	The ship was wrecked at Narva, Russia.
Laura	United Kingdom	The ship was lost near The Needles, Isle of Wight. Her crew were rescued. She was on a voyage from Weymouth, Dorset, to London.
Nancy	United Kingdom	The ship was wrecked on the Irish coast. Her crew were rescued. She was on a voyage from Liverpool, Lancashire, to Boston, Massachusetts, United States.
Nickwell	United Kingdom	The ship sank at New York. She was on a voyage from Jamaica to London.
Providence	(United Kingdom of Great Britain and Ireland) Jersey	The ship was wrecked on the coast of Denmark. Her crew were rescued. She was on a voyage from Saint Petersburg, Russia to Jersey.
Queen of Naples	United Kingdom	The ship was driven ashore on Sanday, Orkney Islands. She was on a voyage from Trondheim, Norway to Belfast, County Antrim. She was reported in January 1807 to have been wrecked.
Rattlesnake	United States	The ship was wrecked on Heneaga. She was on a voyage from Jamaica to Edenton, North Carolina.
Rigby	United Kingdom	The ship was driven ashore near New Ferry, Cheshire. She was on a voyage from Liverpool to Saint Kitts. She was later refloated.
Shelalagh	United Kingdom	The ship ran onto the Mount Batten rocks, Plymouth, Devon. She was on a voyage from Waterford to Southampton, Hampshire. She was refloated.
Supply	United Kingdom	The ship was wrecked on Saaremaa, Russia. She was on a voyage from Leith, Lothian, to Saint Petersburgh, Russia.

== October ==
=== 1 October ===
List of shipwrecks: 1 October 1806
Ship	State	Description
Mary	United Kingdom	The brig ran aground on the Arklow Bank, in the Irish Sea and was wrecked with the loss of seven of the ten people on board. Two of the survivors were rescued by Mary (United Kingdom), a ship homeported in Liverpool, Lancashire, whilst the third was rescued by Mary (United Kingdom), a ship homeported in Amlwch, Anglesey.

=== 2 October ===
List of shipwrecks: 2 October 1806
Ship	State	Description
Warcham	United Kingdom	The ship ran aground off the Isle of Purbeck and sank with the loss of fourteen of the fifteen people on board.

=== 4 October ===
List of shipwrecks: 4 October 1806
Ship	State	Description
Martin	United Kingdom	The ship was driven ashore near Helsingør, Denmark. She was on a voyage from Danzig to Portsmouth, Hampshire. She was later refloated.

=== 6 October ===
List of shipwrecks: 6 October 1806
Ship	State	Description
Favourite	United Kingdom	The ship sprang a leak whilst on a voyage from Lisbon, Portugal to Liverpool, Lancashire. She was set afire and abandoned by her crew.

=== 8 October ===
List of shipwrecks: 8 October 1806
Ship	State	Description
Garland	United Kingdom	The ship departed from the Clyde for Buenos Aires. No further trace, presumed foundered with the loss of all hands.

=== 9 October ===
List of shipwrecks: 9 October 1806
Ship	State	Description
Charlotte	United Kingdom	The ship foundered in Riga Bay.
Nancy	United Kingdom	The ship was driven ashore and wrecked at Riga, Russia.
Traveller	United Kingdom	The ship was driven ashore and wrecked at Riga.

=== 10 October ===
List of shipwrecks: 10 October 1806
Ship	State	Description
Friend's Endeavour	United Kingdom	The sloop ran aground in the River Tay and sank with the loss of one of her four crew. Also reported as 21 October.

=== 12 October ===
List of shipwrecks: 12 October 1806
Ship	State	Description
Svyatoy Nikolay (Святой Николай, 'St. Nicholas')	Imperial Russian Navy	The transport ship ran aground and was subsequently beached at the mouth of the Uda. Her crew survived. She was on a voyage from ru:Nizhnekamchatsk to Okhotsk. The crew were rescued in 1808 and the ship was burnt.

=== 16 October ===
List of shipwrecks: 16 October 1806
Ship	State	Description
Betsey	United Kingdom	The ship was driven ashore in the River Tay and was wrecked. Her crew were rescued. She was on a voyage from Norway to Kincardine.
Pacificio Felix	Portugal	The ship foundered in the North Sea off Great Yarmouth, Norfolk, United Kingdom with the loss of eight of her 22 crew. She was on a voyage from Porto to Hamburg.

=== 17 October ===
List of shipwrecks: 17 October 1806
Ship	State	Description
Cheney, or Chumny	United Kingdom	The ship foundered in the Atlantic Ocean whilst on a voyage from Liverpool, Lancashire, to New York, United States. Her crew were rescued by Port Mary (United Kingdom).

=== 18 October ===
List of shipwrecks: 18 October 1806
Ship	State	Description
Molly	United Kingdom	The ship was dismasted and sprang a leak in the Irish Sea All 32 people on board were rescued by the brig Better Luck Still (United Kingdom).

=== 20 October ===
List of shipwrecks: 20 October 1806
Ship	State	Description
HMS Athenienne	Royal Navy	The third-rate ship of the line was wrecked on the Esquiques Rocks (Skerki Banks), off Tunisia, with the loss of 347 of the 490 people on board.
Charlotta	United Kingdom	The ship departed from Liverpool, Lancashire, for Philadelphia, Pennsylvania, United States. Declared missing on 18 February 1807.

=== 22 October ===
List of shipwrecks: 22 October 1806
Ship	State	Description
Stradsett	United Kingdom	The ship foundered in the North Sea whilst on a voyage from Saint Petersburgh, Russia to King's Lynn, Norfolk. Her crew were rescued by Ploughman (United Kingdom).

=== 23 October ===
List of shipwrecks: 23 October 1806
Ship	State	Description
Camilla	United Kingdom	The brig capsized and was wrecked off the coast of Iceland with the loss of three of her crew. Survivors were rescued on 28 October by a Swedish vessel. She was on a voyage from Saint Petersburg, Russia to Dundee, Forfarshire.

=== 24 October ===
List of shipwrecks: 24 October 1806
Ship	State	Description
Margaret	United Kingdom	The sloop was wrecked near Holyhead, Anglesey, with the loss of all on board. She was on a voyage from Bristol, Gloucestershire, to Greenock, Renfrewshire.

=== 25 October ===
List of shipwrecks: 25 October 1806
Ship	State	Description
Atlas	United Kingdom	The ship was wrecked on the Dumfriess Sands, in the Solway Firth, with the loss of seventeen of her eighteen crew. She was on a voyage from Jamaica to Whitehaven, Cumberland.
Friends	United Kingdom	The ship foundered in the North Sea off Hartlepool, County Durham. Her crew were rescued.
Henrietta	United Kingdom	The ship was wrecked on the Mull of Galloway. Her crew were rescued. She was on a voyage from Campbeltown, Argyllshire, to [Lisbon], Portugal.
Phoenix	United Kingdom	The ship was driven ashore and wrecked at Riga, Russia.
Tay	United Kingdom	The sloop was wrecked on Stromness, Orkney Islands. Her crew were rescued. She was on a voyage from the Hebrides to Hull, Yorkshire.
Thetis	United Kingdom	The ship was wrecked in Riga Bay. She was on a voyage from Riga to Liverpool, Lancashire.
Traveller	United Kingdom	The ship was driven ashore and wrecked at Riga.
Four unnamed vessels	Flags unknown	The ships were driven ashore and wrecked at Riga.

=== 26 October ===
List of shipwrecks: 26 October 1806
Ship	State	Description
Friendship	United Kingdom	The ship foundered in the North Sea whilst on a voyage from Sunderland, County Durham, to Scarborough, Yorkshire. Her crew were rescued.

=== 28 October ===
List of shipwrecks: 28 October 1806
Ship	State	Description
St. Paula	Spain	The ship was driven ashore in the Isles of Scilly, United Kingdom. She was on a voyage from Havana, Captaincy General of Cuba to the Canary Isles.

=== 30 October ===
List of shipwrecks: 30 October 1806
Ship	State	Description
Okhotsk (Охотск)	Imperial Russian Navy	The galliot was driven ashore at Shumshu of the Kuril Islands and wrecked three days later. All on board survived. She was on a voyage from Okhotsk to Petropavlovsk.
HMS Zenobia	Royal Navy	The Adonis-class schooner ran aground 20 nautical miles (37 km) south of Cape Henry, Virginia, United States, and was wrecked. Her 24 crew survived.

=== 31 October ===
List of shipwrecks: 31 October 1806
Ship	State	Description
Sophia	United Kingdom	The crewless ship was taken in to the Rekefjiord on this date. She was on a voyage from London to the Longsound.
Wakefield	United Kingdom	The ship was wrecked near Vila do Conde, Portugal. She was on a voyage from Hull, Yorkshire to Porto, Portugal.

=== Unknown date ===
List of shipwrecks: Unknown date in October 1806
Ship	State	Description
Ark	United Kingdom	The ship was driven ashore near Reval, Russia. She was on a voyage from Saint Petersburg, Russia to Whitby, Yorkshire. Ark was later refloated and taken in to Reval for repairs.
Castle	United Kingdom	The ship was wrecked at Narva, Russia. Her crew were rescued.
Constant Trader	United Kingdom	The ship foundered off the coast of Ireland. She was on a voyage from Chester, Cheshire to Sligo.
Defiance	United Kingdom	The ship was driven ashore at Cork and was wrecked. She was on a voyage from Bristol, Gloucestershire, to Jamaica.
Diamond	United Kingdom	The ship ran aground off Lowestoft, Suffolk.
Endeavour	United Kingdom	The transport ship was driven ashore and damaged at Devil's Point, Devon. She was later refloated and taken in to Plymouth, Devon, for repairs.
Farmer	United Kingdom	The sloop foundered in the Irish Sea off Milford Haven, Pembrokeshire. She was on a voyage from Wexford to Swansea, Glamorgan.
Herberts	United Kingdom	The ship ran aground at Strangford, County Down. Her crew were rescued. She was on a voyage from Grenada to Glasgow, Renfrewshire.
Iris	United Kingdom	The ship was wrecked on Atkinsholm. She was on a voyage from Saint Petersburg to Portsmouth, Hampshire.
Jane	United Kingdom	The ship was wrecked at Narva. Her crew were rescued.
Jenny	United Kingdom	The ship foundered in Galway Bay. She was on a voyage from Liverpool, Lancashire, to Galway.
Johanna Elizabeth	Hamburg	The ship foundered in the North Sea off Borkum, Prussia with the loss of all hands. She was on a voyage from London to Hamburg.
Margaret	United Kingdom	The sloop foundered off Holyhead, Anglesey with the loss of all hands. She was on a voyage from Bristol, Gloucestershire, to Glasgow, Renfrewshire.
Martha	United Kingdom	The ship was wrecked at Bridlington, Yorkshire.
Martin	United States	The ship was wrecked at Bridlington. Her crew were rescued. She was on a voyage from Danzig to Portsmouth, New Hampshire.
Minerva	United Kingdom	The ship was wrecked on the Tegeler Sandbank, off the mouth of the Weser. She was on a voyage from London to Bremen.
Nancy	United Kingdom	The ship foundered with the loss of all hands.
Nancy	United Kingdom	The ship was wrecked on the Irish coast whilst on a voyage from Galway to Dublin.
Phœnix	United Kingdom	The ship was driven ashore and wrecked at Riga, Russia.
Pursuit	United Kingdom	The brig was driven ashore and severely damaged at Topsham, Devon.
Santa Theresa	Portugal	The ship foundered off Husum, Duchy of Holstein.
Trafalgar	United Kingdom	The privateer foundered off Fowey, Cornwall.
Unity	United Kingdom	The ship departed Portsmouth, Hampshire for Scarborough, Yorkshire. No further trace, presumed foundered with the loss of all hands.
Witte Vos	Denmark	The ship ran aground on St Nicholas Island, Devon, United Kingdom and was wrecked. She was on a voyage from Montevideo, Banda Oriental to Hamburg.

== November ==
=== 2 November ===
List of shipwrecks: 2 November 1806
Ship	State	Description
Cheshire	United Kingdom	The ship was driven ashore in Tramore Bay. Her crew were rescued. She was on a voyage from Newport, Monmouthshire to Cork.
Lavinia	United Kingdom	The ship was driven ashore and wrecked at Crail, Fife, with the loss of her captain. She was on a voyage from Saint Petersburg, Russia to Woolwich, Kent.
Mermaid	(United Kingdom of Great Britain and Ireland) Guernsey	The crewless cutter drifted in to Exmouth, Devon.
Thornborough	United Kingdom	The privateer was driven ashore and wrecked near Exmouth with the loss of four of her crew.
Unity	United Kingdom	The West Indiaman was driven ashore and wrecked at Plymouth, Devon, with the loss of one life. Survivors were rescued by a boat from HMS Glatton (Royal Navy). Unity was on a voyage from British Honduras to London.

=== 3 November ===
List of shipwrecks: 3 November 1806
Ship	State	Description
Alexander	(Netherlands) Kingdom of Holland	The ship ran aground on the Goodwin Sands, Kent, United Kingdom. She was on a voyage from Amsterdam, North Holland to St. Ubes, Portugal. She was refloated and taken in to Ramsgate, Kent.
Alfred	United Kingdom	The brig was driven ashore at Gibraltar.
Fanny	United States	The schooner was driven ashore and wrecked at Portland, Dorset, United Kingdom. Her crew were rescued. She was on a voyage from Baltimore, Maryland, to Cowes, Isle of Wight, United Kingdom.
New Syren	United Kingdom	The ship was driven ashore at Portland, Dorset and was wrecked with the loss of two of her crew. She was on a voyage from London to Liverpool, Lancashire.
St. Vincent	United Kingdom	The transport ship was driven ashore at Gibraltar.
Three Sisters	United Kingdom	The ship foundered off the Mull of Kintyre.
Unity	United Kingdom	The brig was wrecked in Ardmenish Bay, Isle of Jura. She was on a voyage from Lisbon, Portugal to Belfast, County Antrim.

=== 4 November ===
List of shipwrecks: 4 November 1806
Ship	State	Description
Camilla	United Kingdom	The ship capsized in the Kattegat. She came ashore on the coast of Jutland and was wrecked.
Franklin	United States	The ship was driven ashore at "L'Aguillon", Charente-Maritime, France. She was on a voyage from Virginia to Nantes, Loire-Inférieure, France.
HMS Redbridge	Royal Navy	The schooner was wrecked at Nassau in the Bahamas.
Sir Godfrey Webster	United Kingdom	The ship was driven ashore at Deal, Kent. She was on a voyage from London to Jamaica. She was refloated with assistance.

=== 5 November ===
List of shipwrecks: 5 November 1806
Ship	State	Description
John and Mary	United Kingdom	The ship foundered in the Atlantic Ocean off St. Ives, Cornwall. Her crew were rescued. She was on a voyage from Youghall, County Cork to Southampton, Hampshire.

=== 7 November ===
List of shipwrecks: 7 November 1806
Ship	State	Description
Dorothea Prospere	Hamburg	The ship foundered in the English Channel off Calais, France. Her crew were rescued She was on a voyage from Hamburg to Bordeaux, Gironde, France.

=== 9 November ===
List of shipwrecks: 9 November 1806
Ship	State	Description
Amity	United Kingdom	The full-rigged ship was wrecked on the West Hoe Rocks, Plymouth, Devon with the loss of one life. She was on a voyage from British Honduras to London.

=== 10 November ===
List of shipwrecks: 10 November 1806
Ship	State	Description
Aberdeen	United Kingdom	The ship departed from Bristol, Gloucestershire, for Baltimore, Maryland, United States. No further trace, presumed foundered with the loss of all hands.
Favourite	United Kingdom	The brig was driven ashore at Greenore Point, County Wexford. Her crew were rescued. She was on a voyage from Liverpool, Lancashire, to Cork and the West Indies.

=== 17 November ===
List of shipwrecks: 17 November 1806
Ship	State	Description
Glasgow	United Kingdom	The ship was driven ashore and wrecked on the Farne Islands with the loss of ten lives. She was on a voyage from Leith, Lothian, to London.

=== 18 November ===
List of shipwrecks: 18 November 1806
Ship	State	Description
Isabella	United Kingdom	The ship was driven ashore near Kronstadt, Russia. She was on a voyage from London to Kronstadt.
Susannah	United Kingdom	The ship struck rocks in Thornton Lough and was wrecked. Her crew were rescued. She was on a voyage from Newcastle upon Tyne, Northumberland to Leith, Lothian.

=== 22 November ===
List of shipwrecks: 22 November 1806
Ship	State	Description
Peggy	United Kingdom	The ship struck rocks at Guernsey, Channel Islands, and was abandoned by her crew. She was on a voyage from Bristol, Gloucestershire, to Guernsey and Jersey, Channel Islands. Peggy was later refloated and taken in to Guernsey.

=== 26 November ===
List of shipwrecks: 26 November 1806
Ship	State	Description
James	United Kingdom	The tender was driven ashore at Neyland, Pembrokeshire.
Jane	United Kingdom	The ship was driven ashore and wrecked at Milford Haven, Pembrokeshire.
Neptune	United Kingdom	The tender was driven ashore at Neyland.

=== 27 November ===
List of shipwrecks: 27 November 1806
Ship	State	Description
Adventurier	Navy of the Kingdom of Holland	War of the Fourth Coalition, Raid on Batavia: The gun-brig was destroyed by fire at Batavia.
Arnisteiyn	(Netherlands) Kingdom of Holland	War of the Fourth Coalition, Raid on Batavia: The full-rigged ship was destroyed by fire at Batavia.
Ceres	Navy of the Kingdom of Holland	War of the Fourth Coalition, Raid on Batavia: The gun-brig was destroyed by fire at Batavia.
Dart	United States	The ship foundered whilst on a voyage from Amsterdam, North Holland Kingdom of Holland to New York.
Doogzoomhayd	(Netherlands) Kingdom of Holland	War of the Fourth Coalition, Raid on Batavia: The full-rigged ship was destroyed by fire at Batavia.
East Indian	(Netherlands) Kingdom of Holland	War of the Fourth Coalition, Raid on Batavia: The ship was destroyed by fire at Batavia.
Jane	United Kingdom	The victualling ship was wrecked at Plymouth, Devon.
Johanna Suzanna	(Netherlands) Kingdom of Holland	War of the Fourth Coalition, Raid on Batavia: The ship was destroyed by fire at Batavia.
Ludwig von Vinck	(Netherlands) Kingdom of Holland	War of the Fourth Coalition, Raid on Batavia: The ship was burtn at Batavia by the British.
Patriot	(Netherlands) Kingdom of Holland	War of the Fourth Coalition, Raid on Batavia: The 18-gun ship was destroyed by fire at Batavia.
Phœnix	Navy of the Kingdom of Holland	War of the Fourth Coalition, Raid on Batavia: The frigate was destroyed by fire at Batavia.
Prussian	(Netherlands) Kingdom of Holland	War of the Fourth Coalition, Raid on Batavia: The ship was destroyed by fire at Batavia.
Snelheiyd	(Netherlands) Kingdom of Holland	War of the Fourth Coalition, Raid on Batavia: The brig was destroyed by fire at Batavia.
William	Navy of the Kingdom of Holland	War of the Fourth Coalition: The corvette was captured by the Royal Navy. Deemed unfit for service, she was subsequently destroyed.
Zee-Ploeg	Navy of the Kingdom of Holland	War of the Fourth Coalition, Raid on Batavia: The 24-gun ship was destroyed by fire at Batavia.
Zuider Pole	(Netherlands) Kingdom of Holland	War of the Fourth Coalition, Raid on Batavia: The ship was destroyed by fire at Batavia.

=== 29 November ===
List of shipwrecks: 29 November 1806
Ship	State	Description
Port au Prince	United Kingdom	The ship was burnt at Foa, Tonga (19°45′S 174°18′W). Thirty-seven of her 62 crew were murdered by the Tongans.

=== 30 November ===
List of shipwrecks: 30 November 1806
Ship	State	Description
Susannah	United States	The ship was lost whilst on a voyage from Wilmington, Delaware, to Jamaica.

=== Unknown date ===
List of shipwrecks: Unknown date in November 1806
Ship	State	Description
Ann	United Kingdom	The ship foundered in the Gulf of Finland. She was on a voyage from Saint Petersburg, Russia to South Shields, County Durham.
Bellona	United Kingdom	The ship was driven ashore at Liverpool, Lancashire. She was on a voyage from Charleston, South Carolina, United States to Liverpool.
Brilliant	United Kingdom	The ship was wrecked on the Norwegian coast. She was on a voyage from Trondheim to Galway.
Brothers	United Kingdom	The ship foundered off Strömstadt, Sweden.
HMS Busy	Royal Navy	The brig-sloop foundered off the coast of Nova Scotia, British North America with the loss of all hands.
HMS Clinker	Royal Navy	The gun-vessel foundered off the French coast with the loss of all hands.
Constant Mary	United Kingdom	The ship was wrecked in the Gulf of Finland. Her crew were rescued. She was on a voyage from Helsingfors, Sweden to Newcastle upon Tyne, Northumberland.
Content's Increase	United Kingdom	The ship foundered in the North Sea off Harwich, Essex. Her crew were rescued.
Desire	United Kingdom	The ship was wrecked on Hogland, Russia. She was on a voyage from Wyburg, Russia to Liverpool, Lancashire.
Favourite	United Kingdom	The ship was driven ashore at Kirkcudbright. She was on a voyage from Jamaica to Whitehaven, Cumberland.
Fame	United Kingdom	The ship was driven ashore and wrecked on Walney Island, Lancashire. She was on a voyage from Dublin to the River Duddon.
Frederica	(Denmark) Norway	The ship was wrecked at Bigton, Shetland Islands, United Kingdom. Her crew were rescued. She was on a voyage from Dublin, United Kingdom ot Kristiansand.
Grove Hill	United Kingdom	The ship was driven ashore on Gotland, Sweden. Her crew were rescued. She was on a voyage from Reval, Russia to Hull, Yorkshire. Grove Hill was later refloated.
Hampshire	United Kingdom	The ship was driven ashore and wrecked in Carnarvon Bay. She was on a voyage from New Orleans, Territory of Orleans to Liverpool.
Hope	United States	The ship was wrecked on the French coast. She was on a voyage from Virginia to Cork, United Kingdom.
Industry	United Kingdom	The ship was driven ashore near Cardigan. She was on a voyage from Greenock, Renfrewshire, to Cork.
Jean	United Kingdom	The ship was wrecked on the Niding. Her crew were rescued. She was on a voyage from Riga, Russia to Dundee, Forfarshire.
John	(United Kingdom of Great Britain and Ireland) New South Wales	The sloop departed from King Island. No further trace; presumed foundered with the loss of all hands.
John and Mary	United Kingdom	The ship was driven ashore on the Isle of Man. She was on a voyage from New York, United States to Liverpool.
John Morgan	United States	The ship was driven ashore near Castletown, Isle of Man. She was on a voyage from New York, United States to Liverpool.
Jonge Anna Dorothea	Hamburg	The ship was wrecked on the coast of Jutland. She was on a voyage from London, United Kingdom to Hamburg.
Joseph & Betsey	United Kingdom	The ship was driven ashore near Lymington, Hampshire. She was on a voyage from Weymouth, Dorset, to London.
Kaparen	Prussia	The ship was wrecked whilst on a voyage from Memel to Hull. There was some loss of life.
Mary	United Kingdom	The ship was wrecked on the Norwegian coast with the loss of her captain. She was on a voyage from Trondheim to Dublin.
Merrimack	Duchy of Holstein	The ship was detained by HMS Racehorse (Royal Navy) but was subsequently lost off Guernsey, Channel Islands. She was on a voyage from Veracruz, Viceroyalty of New Granada to Tönningen.
Pombinha	Portugal	The ship was wrecked on Skagen. Denmark. She was on a voyage from Saint Petersburg to Porto.
Ringen de Jacob	Bremen	The ship was driven ashore and wrecked on the coast of Jutland. She was on a voyage from Liverpool to Bremen.
Severn	United Kingdom	The ship sprang a leak in the North Sea whilst on a voyage from Sunderland, County Durham, to London. She put into Scarborough, Yorkshire, where she sank.
Shepherdess	United Kingdom	The ship was driven ashore and wrecked at Cape Henry, Virginia, United States. She was on a voyage from London to Virginia.
Thomas	United Kingdom	The ship was wrecked on the Arklow Bank, in the Irish Sea off the coast of County Wicklow. She was on a voyage from Stockholm, Sweden to Bristol, Gloucestershire.
Two Friends	United Kingdom	The ship was driven ashore near Charleston, South Carolina, United States before 25 November.
Woodbine	United Kingdom	War of the Fourth Coalitoh: The brig was captured by the privateer L'Espoir (France). She was subsequently wrecked at "Routhianville", France.

== December ==
=== 1 December ===
List of shipwrecks: 1 December 1806
Ship	State	Description
HMS Astrea	Royal Navy	The Active-class frigate ran aground off Anholt, Denmark. She was refloated and put into Helsingør for repairs.

=== 2 December ===
List of shipwrecks: 2 December 1806
Ship	State	Description
Eliza	United Kingdom	The ship was driven ashore at Aberdyfi, Caernarfonshire She was on a voyage from Dublin to Cork and Trinidad.
Three Sisters	Denmark	The brig was driven ashore in Widemouth Bay. Her crew were rescued. She was on a voyage from Glasgow, Renfrewshire, United Kingdom to Livorno, Grand Duchy of Tuscany.
William	United States	The brig was wrecked in Widemouth Bay. Her crew were rescued. She was on a voyage from São Miguel, Azores to Liverpool, Lancashire, United Kingdom.

=== 3 December ===
List of shipwrecks: 3 December 1806
Ship	State	Description
Economy	United Kingdom	The ship was driven ashore and wrecked at Padstow, Cornwall. Her crew were rescued. She was on a voyage from Waterford to Southampton, Hampshire.
Eliza	United Kingdom	The ship was driven ashore at Cardigan. Her crew were rescued. She was on a voyage from Virginia, United States to Dublin.
John	United Kingdom	The ship was driven ashore at Caernarfon. She was on a voyage from Youghal, County Cork, to Dublin.
Lord Nelson	United Kingdom	The ship was wrecked at St. Andrews, Fife with the loss of all five passengers and crew.
Milford	United States	The ship was driven ashore and wrecked at Cardigan. Her crew were rescued. She was on a voyage from Liverpool to Wilmington, Delaware.
Papillon	France	War of the Third Coalition: The privateer, a lugger, was driven ashore and wrecked at Littlehampton, Sussex, United Kingdom. Her 30 crew survived; 25 of them were rescued by a British brig, which they took possession of and put her crew into a boat. They sailed for a French port. The other five were made prisoners of war.
Sally	United Kingdom	The ship was driven ashore at Cardigan. Her crew were rescued. She was on a voyage from Dublin to Waterford.

=== 5 December ===
List of shipwrecks: 5 December 1806
Ship	State	Description
George Washington	United States	The ship was wrecked at Easter Quarff, Shetland Islands, United Kingdom. She was on a voyage from Hamburg to Salem, Massachusetts.

=== 7 December ===
List of shipwrecks: 7 December 1806
Ship	State	Description
Three Friends	United States	The ship foundered off Bermuda.

=== 8 December ===
List of shipwrecks: 8 December 1806
Ship	State	Description
Endeavour	United Kingdom	The ship was driven ashore and wrecked near St. Ives, Cornwall.

=== 10 December ===
List of shipwrecks: 10 December 1806
Ship	State	Description
Ann	United Kingdom	The sloop foundered in the English Channel off Christchurch, Hampshire with the loss of at least eleven lives. She was on a voyage from Cowes, Isle of Wight to Poole, Dorset.
Trelawney	United Kingdom	The West Indiaman was wrecked on the Ness Sands, in the Bristol Channel off the coast of Glamorgan and was wrecked with the loss of twelve lives. There were around fifteen or twenty survivors. She was on a voyage from Bristol, Gloucestershire to Jamaica.

=== 11 December ===
List of shipwrecks: 11 December 1806
Ship	State	Description
Betsey	United States	The ship was wrecked at Plymouth, Devon, United Kingdom with the loss of six of her fourteen crew. She was on a voyage from New York to Amsterdam, North Holland, Kingdom of Holland.
HMS Surinam	Royal Navy	HMS Surinam after she was struck by lightning. The Cruizer-class brig-sloop was struck by lightning in the Bay of Biscay south west of Belle Île, Morbihan, France with the loss of two of her crew. She was subsequently repaired and returned to service.

=== 12 December ===
List of shipwrecks: 12 December 1806
Ship	State	Description
Sedgefield	United Kingdom	The ship was run down and sunk in the North Sea off the mouth of the River Tees. Her crew were rescued.

=== 13 December ===
List of shipwrecks: 13 December 1806
Ship	State	Description
Resolution	United States	The ship was wrecked at Salcombe, Devon, United Kingdom with the loss of two of her crew. She was on a voyage from London to St. Lucar, Spain.

=== 14 December ===
List of shipwrecks: 14 December 1806
Ship	State	Description
Catherine	United Kingdom	The ship was struck by lightning and sank at Milford Haven, Pembrokeshire.
Courage	Russia	The ship was driven ashore at Shoeburyness, Essex, United Kingdom.
Deborah	United Kingdom	The ship was struck by lightning at Milford Haven and was beached.
Nancy	United Kingdom	The ship was driven ashore at Ramsgate, Kent. She was on a voyage from London to Portsmouth, Hampshire.
Patriote	Sweden	The ship was driven ashore at Ramsgate. She was on a voyage from Gävle to Gibraltar.
Triton	Hamburg	The ship was driven ashore at Ramsgate. She was on a voyage from Hamburg to Saint Thomas, Virgin Islands. Triton was later refloated and brought in to Ramgsate.

=== 15 December ===
List of shipwrecks: 15 December 1806
Ship	State	Description
Providence	United States	The ship sprang a leak and foundered in the Atlantic Ocean (47°48′N 32°37′W). Her crew were rescued by Rodney (United States). Providence was on a voyage from Philadelphia, Pennsylvania, to Bremen.
Two Sisters	United Kingdom	The ship was driven ashore at Newhaven, Edinburgh.

=== 17 December ===
List of shipwrecks: 17 December 1806
Ship	State	Description
Hazard	France	The cutter, a privateer, was run down and sunk by HMS Avenger (Royal Navy) with the loss of 43 of her 49 crew.
Loyal Sam	United Kingdom	The ship was driven ashore on Bermuda.
Perseverance	United Kingdom	The ship foundered in the North Sea 10 leagues (30 nautical miles (56 km)) south west of Lindesnes, Norway. Her crew were rescued by Nelly and Ann (United Kingdom). She was on a voyage from Helsingør, Denmark to Dublin.
Three Brothers	United Kingdom	The ship foundered off Grand Cayman. She was on a voyage from Jamaica to New York, United States.

=== 18 December ===
List of shipwrecks: 18 December 1806
Ship	State	Description
Margaret	United Kingdom	The ship was wrecked on a reef off the coast of Brazil. She was on a voyage from Belfast, County Down, to the River Plate.

=== 19 December ===
List of shipwrecks: 19 December 1806
Ship	State	Description
John & William	United Kingdom	The ship was wrecked on the Mount Batten Rocks, off Plymouth, Devon. She was on a voyage from Plymouth to Dartmouth, Devon.

=== 21 December ===
List of shipwrecks: 21 December 1806
Ship	State	Description
Anna Maria	United States	The ship was wrecked on the French coast. She was on a voyage from New York to Bordeaux, Gironde, France.
Skelton Castle	United Kingdom	During a voyage from Portsmouth, the East Indiaman parted company with Union (United Kingdom) near the Cape of Good Hope at 35°18′S 011°45′W to proceed independently to Madras and was never heard from again.

=== 22 December ===
List of shipwrecks: 22 December 1806
Ship	State	Description
Three Brothers	United Kingdom	The brig was wrecked on the Southerness Sands, in the Irish Sea off the coast of Dumfriesshire.

=== 24 December ===
List of shipwrecks: 24 December 1806
Ship	State	Description
Adventure	United Kingdom	The ship foundered on a voyage from Montserrat to Liverpool, Lancashire, Her crew were rescued.
Novo Moro	Portugal	The ship was lost near Swansea, Glamorgan, United Kingdom.

=== 25 December ===
List of shipwrecks: 25 December 1806
Ship	State	Description
Atalanta	United Kingdom	The ship was driven ashore in Loch Indaal. She was on a voyage from Liverpool, Lancashire, to Buenos Aires.
Birmingham	United Kingdom	The packet ship was driven ashore and wrecked at Barrhouse, Argyllshire. Her crew were rescued. She was on a voyage from Charleston, South Carolina, United States to the Clyde.
Centurion	United Kingdom	The ship was driven ashore and wrecked on Flotta, Orkney Islands. She was on a voyage from a Baltic port to Liverpool.
Europe	United Kingdom	The ship was wrecked in the Orkney Islands with the loss of all but three of her crew. She was on a voyage from Danzig to Liverpool.
Elizabeth	United Kingdom	The ship was driven ashore in the River Foyle.
Fame	United Kingdom	The ship was wrecked in the River Foyle.
Fisher	United Kingdom	The ship foundered in the North Sea off Thurso, Caithness. She was on a voyage from Leith, Lothian, to Thurso.
Good News	(Denmark) Norway	The brigantine was driven ashore at Campbeltown, Argyllshire. She was on a voyage from Kristiansand to Liverpool. She was refloated.
Hawke	United Kingdom	The ship was driven ashore and wrecked on Skye.
Juno	United Kingdom	The ship was driven ashore in Wemyss Bay. Her crew were rescued. She was on a voyage from Stranraer, Wigtownshire, to the Clyde
xxxx	United Kingdom	The .
Lilly	United Kingdom	The ship was driven ashore and wrecked on Skye.
Mary	United Kingdom	The brigantine was driven ashore at Campbeltown. She was on a voyage from Ayr to Buenos Aires, Brazil.
Novo Moro	Portugal	The ship ran aground at Port Eynon Point, Glamorgan, United Kingdom. Her nineteen crew survived. She was on a voyage from Porto to Amsterdam, North Holland, Netherlands.
Thetis	United Kingdom	The ship was driven ashore and wrecked on Balta Island, Shetland Islands. Her crew were rescued. She was on a voyage from Saint Petersburgh, Russia to Liverpool.
Traveller	United Kingdom	The ship was driven ashore and wrecked on Flotta, Orkney Islands with the loss of sixteen of the seventeen people on board.
Unnamed	United Kingdom	The sloop sank in the Fair Way, off the coast of Northumberland.
Unnamed	United Kingdom	The sloop foundered on the Staples, off the coast of Northumberland, with the loss of all hands.
Six unnamed vessels	United Kingdom	The fishing smacks were wrecked in Thurso Bay with the loss of eight lives.
Unnamed	United Kingdom	The sloop was driven ashore and wrecked on Skye with the loss of all hands.
Three unnamed vessels	United Kingdom	The fishing boats were driven ashore and wrecked at Stotfield, Morayshire with the loss of all 21 crew.

=== 26 December ===
List of shipwrecks: 26 December 1806
Ship	State	Description
Providence	United Kingdom	The ship was driven ashore and wrecked near Blakeney, Norfolk. Her crew were rescued. She was on a voyage from Sunderland, County Durham, to King's Lynn, Norfolk.

=== 29 December ===
List of shipwrecks: 29 December 1806
Ship	State	Description
Louisa	Sweden	The ship was wrecked on the Swedish coast. She was on a voyage from Stockholm to Newry, County Armagh, United Kingdom.

=== 30 December ===
List of shipwrecks: 30 December 1806
Ship	State	Description
Galwiel	Sweden	The ship was lost near Ny-Hellesund, Norway. She was on a voyage from Stockholm to St. Ubes, Portugal.

=== Unknown date ===
List of shipwrecks: Unknown date in December 1806
Ship	State	Description
Ann	United Kingdom	The ship was wrecked on Öland, Sweden. She was on a voyage from Liverpool, Lancashire, to Stockholm.
Aurora	United Kingdom	The ship foundered off Lamlash, Isle of Arran.
Baltic Merchant	United Kingdom	The ship was driven ashore on Gotland, Sweden. She was on a voyage from Riga, Russia to London.
Barbara	United Kingdom	The ship was wrecked at Ballina, County Mayo. She was on a voyage from Sligo to Dublin.
Beresford	United Kingdom	The ship was driven ashore and wrecked at Hoyle. She was on a voyage from Kinsale, County Cork, to Liverpool.
Britannia	United Kingdom	The ship was driven ashore on Jura. She was on a voyage from Limerick to Greenock, Renfrewshire.
Caroline	United States	The ship was driven ashore and wrecked at Livorno, Grand Duchy of Tuscany.
Coaster	United Kingdom	The ship was wrecked on an island 50 nautical miles (93 km) off Kronstadt, Russia. Her crew were rescued. She was on a voyage from Glasgow, Renfrewshire, to Saint Petersburg, Russia.
Commerce	United Kingdom	The ship sank in the Lymington River. She was on a voyage from Arundel, Sussex, to Plymouth, Devon.
Commerce	United Kingdom	The ship was lost in Mount's Bay with the loss of all hands. She was on a voyage from Newfoundland, British North America to London.
Diana	United Kingdom	The ship was driven ashore in the River Clyde. She was on a voyage from Glasgow, Renfrewshire to Jamaica.
Diligence	United Kingdom	The ship was driven ashore and severely damaged. She was refloated and taken in to Whitby, Yorkshire.
Eleanor	United Kingdom	The ship was driven ashore at Beaumaris, Anglesey. She was on a voyage from Liverpool to Wexford.
Elizabeth	United Kingdom	The ship was driven ashore in the Clyde. She was on a voyage from Glasgow to Tortola.
Emerald	United Kingdom	The ship was driven ashore near Dragør, Denmark. She was on a voyage from Memel, Prussia to Leith, Lothian.
Endle	United Kingdom	The ship was driven ashore on Götaland, Sweden. She was on a voyage from Riga, Russia to London.
Fitzwilliam	United States	The ship was driven ashore at Livorno.
Four Sisters	United Kingdom	The ship was wrecked at Dartmouth, Devon.
Governor Claibon	United Kingdom	The ship foundered off San Sebastián, Spain whilst on a voyage from London to San Sebastián and Bordeaux, Gironde, France.
Grampus	United Kingdom	The ship was lost near Christiansand, Norway. She was on a voyage from Christiansand to Bristol, Gloucestershire.
Happy Return	United Kingdom	The ship was driven ashore and wrecked at Liverpool. Her crew were rescued. She was on a voyage from Drogheda, County Louth, to Liverpool.
Harmony	United Kingdom	The ship was wrecked at Riga, Russia. Her crew were rescued. She was on a voyage from Riga to London.
Henry	United States	The ship was driven ashore at Livorno.
Hero	(United Kingdom of Great Britain and Ireland) Guernsey	The ship sank at Messina, Kingdom of Sicily.
Hiram	United Kingdom	The ship was wrecked on the Norwegian coast. She was on a voyage from Norway to Cork.
I. O.	United Kingdom	The brig was driven ashore at Portland, Dorset. Her crew were rescued. She was on a voyage from Topsham, Devon to Cardiff, Glamorgan.
Independence	United States	The ship was driven ashore in the Clyde. She was on a voyage from Charleston, South Carolina, to the Clyde. Independence was later refloated.
Jenny	United Kingdom	The ship was lost in Dunbar Bay. She was on a voyage from Newcastle upon Tyne, Northumberland to Leith, Lothian.
Lord Keith	United Kingdom	The ship was in collision with another vessel and was abandoned in the North Sea. She was subsequently taken in to Hull, Yorkshire by Nancy (United Kingdom).
Luna	United Kingdom	The ship was driven ashore at Kristiansand, Norway. She was on a voyage from Arkhangelsk, Russia to London.
Margaret	United Kingdom	The ship sank at "Port Crawford". She was on a voyage from Dublin to Greenock.
Martha	United Kingdom	The sloop sprang a leak off Margate, Kent and was abandoned by her crew. She was on a voyage from London to Dover, Kent.
Mary	United Kingdom	The ship was driven ashore in Bootle Bay. she was on a voyage from Liverpool to Jamaica. She was refloated.
Minerva	United Kingdom	The ship was wrecked on the coast of Norway with the loss of all hands. She was on a voyage from Memel, Prussia to London.
Morgenstern	Danzig	The ship was driven ashore on Rathlin Island, County Antrim, United Kingdom. She was on a voyage from Danzig to Londonderry.
Neptune	Danzig	The ship was wrecked off Winterton-on-Sea, Norfolk, United Kingdom. Her crew were rescued. She was on a voyage from Danzig to London.
Oporto or Porto	Portugal	The ship was driven ashore and wrecked about 12 nautical miles (22 km) from Pwllheli, Caernarvonshire, United Kingdom. She was on a voyage from Porto to Liverpool.
Quaker	United Kingdom	The ship foundered in the North Sea off Margate, Kent, United Kingdom. Her crew and part of her cargo were saved. She was returning to London from New York.
Republican	United Kingdom	The ship was driven ashore at Livorno.
Retrieve	United Kingdom	The ship was wrecked on Bornholm, Denmark. Her crew were rescued. She was on a voyage from Saint Petersburg, Russia to London.
Ruthy	United Kingdom	The ship was driven ashore at the mouth of the Baltimore River, She was on a voyage from Liverpool to Baltimore, Maryland, United States.
Sally	United Kingdom	The ship foundered. Her crew were rescued, some of them by George (United States). Sally was on a voyage from Baltimore, Maryland to Cork.
Speculation	(Denmark) Norway	The ship was driven ashore at Bideford, Devon, United Kingdom. She was on a voyage from Dublin, United Kingdom to Bordeaux, Gironde, France.
Thomas	United Kingdom	The ship departed from Youghal, County Cork for London in early December. No further trace, presumed foundered with the loss of all hands.
Three Williams	United Kingdom	The ship was driven ashore near Exmouth, Devon.
Two Marias	United States	The ship was driven ashore at Livorno.
Venus	United States	The ship was wrecked at Rio Bueno, Jamaica.
Virgin del Carmen	Spain	War of the Fourth Coalition: The ship was captured by Minerva (United Kingdom). She was subsequently wrecked in the Isles of Scilly, United Kingdom. Virgin del Carmen was on a voyage from Veracruz, Viceroyalty of New Granada to San Sebastián.
William	United Kingdom	The ship was driven ashore and wrecked at Southsea Castle, Hampshire. She was on a voyage from Plymouth to Portsmouth, Hampshire. William was later refloated and taken in to Portsmouth.
Unnamed	Flag unknown	The brig was driven ashore near Bude, Cornwall.
Unnamed	(United Kingdom of Great Britain and Ireland) Isle of Man	The ship was wrecked in the Bay of Luce with the loss of all but one of her crew.

== Unknown date ==
List of shipwrecks: Unknown date in 1806
Ship	State	Description
Active	United Kingdom	War of the Third Coalition: The transport ship was captured and burnt before 20 March by a squadron including Castor, Éole, Foudroyant, Impétueux, Patriote, Valeureuse and Vétéran (all French Navy).
Aim	United Kingdom	The transport ship was wrecked at Messina, Kingdom of Sicily.
Albert	United States	The ship was wrecked at Cape Maize. She was on a voyage from Boston, Massachusetts, to Jamaica.
Alligator	France	The ship was lost on Grand Cayman. She was on a voyage from a French port to New Orleans, Territory of Orleans.
Ann	United Kingdom	The ship was wrecked in the Turks Islands. She was on a voyage from Quebec City, Lower Canada, British North America to Jamaica.
Ann	United Kingdom	The ship was driven ashore on Tortola. She was on a voyage from Berbice to Liverpool. She was refloated and placed under repair.
Arethusa	United Kingdom	The ship was driven ashore on the coast of Surinam.
Argo	United Kingdom	The ship was wrecked in the White Sea.
Argo	United Kingdom	The ship was lost on the coast of Africa.
Atlas	United Kingdom	The ship foundered off "Bouness" with the loss of all hands. She was on a voyage from Jamaica to Whitehaven, Cumberland.
Belle Canadian	(United Kingdom of Great Britain and Ireland) British North America	The ship was wrecked in the Magdalen Islands. She was on a voyage from Quebec City to Newfoundland.
Braave	Royal Navy	The ship foundered off the Grand Banks of Newfoundland. Her crew were rescued by HMS Donegal (Royal Navy). HMS Braave was on a voyage from Jamaica to England.
Brandy Wine	United States	The ship was wrecked on Heneaga whilst on a voyage from New York to Jamaica.
Brilliant	United Kingdom	The ship was wrecked at Demerara.
Cator	French Navy	The ship foundered in a hurricane.
Chyorny Oryol (Чёрный орёл, 'Black Eagle')	Imperial Russian Navy	The cutter was driven ashore in the Yam Islands. She was refloated in 1808 and taken in to Okhotsk, where she was condemned.
City of Cork	United Kingdom	The ship was wrecked on the coast of British Honduras. She was on a voyage from London to British Honduras.
Edward	United Kingdom	The ship was wrecked on Long Island, New York, United States. She was on a voyage from Dublin to New York City.
Elizabeth	United Kingdom	War of the Third Coalition: The ship was captured and sunk by a French privateer. She was on a voyage from Jersey, Channel Islands, to Limerick.
Elizabeth	United Kingdom	The transport ship was sunk by ice off Cape Breton Island, British North America. Her crew were rescued.
Essex	United States	The ship was captured by an Arab vessel and sunk. Her crew were killed.
Esther	United Kingdom	The ship was lost in the Gambia River, Africa. She was on a voyage from Liverpool to the Gambia.
Esther	United Kingdom	The ship was lost on the Grand Banks of Newfoundland.
Eyam	United Kingdom	The ship was driven ashore at Sharks Point, Kingdom of Kongo. She was on a voyage from Liverpool to the Congo River. She was refloated and taken in to the Congo River.
General Doyle	United Kingdom	The ship foundered with the loss of three of her crew. She was on a voyage from London to Newcastle upon Tyne, Northumberland and Grenada.
George	United Kingdom	The ship was wrecked on New Year's Island, New South Wales in late January or early February. Her crew survived.
George	United Kingdom	The ship was lost off Barbuda. She was on a voyage from Barbados to London.
George	(United States) Territory of Orleans	The ship foundered off the Bahamas. Her crew were rescued. She was on a voyage from New Orleans to Nantes, Loire-Inférieure, France.
Harriet	United Kingdom	The ship foundered off the Turks Islands. She was on a voyage from Jamaica to Halifax, Nova Scotia, British North America.
HMS Heureux	Royal Navy	The post ship disappeared sometime in the spring of 1806 during a voyage from the West Indies to Halifax with the loss of all 155 hands.
Hiram	United States	The ship was wrecked in the Turks Islands. She was on a voyage from Wilmington, Delaware, to Jamaica.
Integrity	United States	The ship foundered off the Turks Islands. Her crew were rescued. She was on a voyage from New York to Jamaica.
Isaac	United States	The ship was wrecked on Heneaga. She was on a voyage from Philadelphia, Pennsylvania, to Jamaica.
Jane	United Kingdom	Atlantic slave trade: The ship was destroyed by an explosion in the Congo. Byam rescued her master, crew, and 25 slaves.
Jane	United Kingdom	The ship was lost in the Bahamas Islands.
John	United Kingdom	The slave ship was wrecked at Charleston, South Carolina. Her crew and slaves were rescued. She was on a voyage from Africa to Charleston.
John and James	United Kingdom	The whaler was lost off Cape Horn in 1806, possibly in January. Her loss was attributed to a mutinous crew. She was on a voyage from London to the South Seas.
Kitty	United Kingdom	War of the Third Coalition: The ship was captured by Cassard (French Navy). whilst on a voyage from Liverpool to Buenos Aires. She was set afire and sunk.
Lady Jane	United Kingdom	The ship foundered whilst on a voyage from Saint Vincent to Dublin. Her crew were rescued by Sally (United Kingdom).
Liberty	United Kingdom	The ship sank in the St. Lawrence River. She was on a voyage from Quebec to Plymouth, Devon.
London Packet	United States	The ship was lost in the Delaware River. She was on a voyage from Baltimore, Maryland, to Jamaica.
Louisa	United Kingdom	The transport ship was wrecked at Messina.
Magdelaine	United Kingdom	The ship was wrecked on the American coast. She was on a voyage from Chaleur Bay to Boston, Massachusetts.
Malta	United Kingdom	The ship ran aground and sank at Gibraltar. She was on a voyage from Portsmouth, Hampshire, to Gibraltar.
Maria	United Kingdom	The ship was wrecked on Dry Tortuga. She was on a voyage from Jamaica to Halifax.
Martha	United Kingdom	The ship was wrecked in the Caicos Islands. Her crew were rescued.
Mary	United States	The ship was lost in the Savannah River. She was on a voyage from Savannah, Georgia, to Barbados.
Mary	United Kingdom	The ship was driven ashore at Grenada. She was on a voyage from Grenada to London.
Mary	United Kingdom	The ship was driven ashore and wrecked on Indian Island, Labrador, British North America.
Maryann	United Kingdom	The ship was lost at Barbados. She was on a voyage from Newcastle upon Tyne to Grenada.
Mentor	United Kingdom	The ship was wrecked on Crooked Island, Bahamas. She was on a voyage from New Providence, New Jersey, United States to Liverpool.
New Euphrates	United Kingdom	The whaler was lost at Madagascar. She was on a voyage from the South Seas to London.
Pamela	United Kingdom	The ship was lost near Bermuda. She was on a voyage from Quebec to Jamaica.
Partridge	United Kingdom	The ship was wrecked near Tortola before 28 November. She was on a voyage from Madeira to Saint Thomas, Virgin Islands.
Perseverance	United Kingdom	The ship was wrecked on Cape Breton Island, Nova Scotia. She was on a voyage from Liverpool to Pictou, Nova Scotia.
Piémontaise	French Navy	War of the Third Coalition: The Consolante-class frigate was driven ashore near Tranquebar, Danish India in an action with HMS Russell (Royal Navy). Piémontaise was refloated and taken in to Tranquebar.
Pyomingo	United Kingdom	The ship was driven ashore in the Berry Islands. She was on a voyage from London to New Orleans.
Rosina	United Kingdom	The ship foundered whilst on a voyage from Surinam to London. HMS Gorgon (Royal Navy) rescued the crew and brought them into Milford. Lloyd's List reported her lost in its 14 February 1806 edition.
Rover	United Kingdom	War of the Third Coalition: The ship was captured and burnt by Régulus (French Navy). She was on a voyage from New Brunswick, British North America to Jamaica.
Sally	United Kingdom	The ship capsized with the loss of all but two of her crew. She was on a voyage from Cuba to New York.
Sisters	United Kingdom	The ship foundered in the Grand Banks of Newfoundland.
Susannah	United Kingdom	The ship was wrecked at "Bunby", Africa. She was on a voyage from Liverpool to Africa.
Susannah	United Kingdom	War of the Third Coalition: The ship was captured and burnt before 20 March by a squadron including Castor, Éole, Foudroyant, Impétueux, Patriote, Valeureuse and Vétéran (all French Navy). Susannah was on a voyage from Liverpool to Fayal, Azores.
Thomas	United Kingdom	The ship came ashore crewless on the Isaac Bank in the Gulf of Florida. She was plundered and set afire by local inhabitants. She was on a voyage from Greenock, Renfrewshire, to New Orleans.
Two Brothers	United Kingdom	The ship was lost in Quiberon Bay with the loss of all but her captain.
Walker	United Kingdom	The transport ship was lost in the River Plate. Her crew were rescued.
Young Lion	United Kingdom	The ship was lost in the Bahamas. She was on a voyage from Jamaica to Wilmington, Delaware.
Unnamed	United Kingdom	The ship foundered whilst on a voyage from Portsmouth to the West Indies. Her crew were rescued by HMS Canada (Royal Navy).
