= HMS Redbridge (1804) =

History

United Kingdom
- Name: HMS Redbridge
- Acquired: 1804 by purchase
- Fate: Wrecked 4 November 1806

General characteristics
- Tons burthen: 131 (bm)
- Sail plan: Schooner
- Armament: 10 guns

HMS Redbridge was the mercantile schooner Union that the Royal Navy purchased in 1804. She wrecked at Nassau, Bahamas in November 1806.

== Career ==
She was registered on 10 September 1805. Lieutenant Edward Burt commissioned her.

On 11 July 1806 Redbridge was in company with the privateer Fanny when they captured the American brig Stork. At some point Burt was shot through the hand while chasing a privateer into a port in Cuba.

Redbridge was wrecked at Nassau on 4 November 1806. She had sailed from New Providence Bahamas in company with Gipsy, but when Gipsy developed a leak the two captains decided to put in at Nassau. Redbridge anchored and Lieutenant Burt went ashore to speak with the Governor. While he was ashore the pilot and master tried to move Redbridge to a better anchorage. Redbridge hit a rock, bilged, and rolled on her side. Her masts were cut away but all that could be done was to remove her crew. Next morning Redbridge was abandoned as a wreck. The subsequent court-martial exonerated Burt.
