= Ceres (1802 ship) =

British-registered slave ship

History

United Kingdom
- Name: Ceres
- Namesake: Ceres - the Roman goddess of agriculture
- Owner: 1806: Samuel Newton, Thomas Hayes, & Thomas Graham
- Launched: 1800 or 1802
- Fate: Capsized late 1806 or early 1807

General characteristics
- Tons burthen: 128 (bm)
- Propulsion: Sail
- Sail plan: Brig
- Notes: Built of Bermuda cedar (Juniperus bermudiana)

Ceres was launched at Bermuda in 1800, or 1802. She came to Liverpool in 1806 and commenced a voyage as a slave ship. She was wrecked in late 1806 or early 1807 as she was leaving Africa for the West Indies, with a full cargo of slaves, all of whom apparently were lost.

== Career ==
Ceres was first listed in Lloyd's Register (LR) in 1806 with Mortimore, master, S. Newton & Co., owners, and trade Liverpool–Africa.

Between 1 January 1806 and 1 May 1807, 185 vessels cleared Liverpool outward bound in the slave trade. Thirty of these vessels made two voyages during this period. Of the 155 vessels, 114 were regular slave ships, having made two voyages during the period, or voyages before 1806. Ceres was one of the 30 vessels that twice cleared outbound.

Captain John Mortimer sailed from Liverpool on 7 January 1806, bound for the area between Rio Nuñez and the Assini River. She had a crew of 26 men.

Lloyd's List reported on 14 January 1806 that Ceres, Mortimer, master, "from Africa", was on shore near Liverpool and was reportedly a total loss. Some two weeks later Lloyd's List reported that Ceres, Mortimer, master, which had gotten on shore while sailing from Liverpool to Africa, had been gotten off and had returned to Liverpool.

Ceres, Mortimer, master, set out again, but on 10 March she was among the vessels that a violent gale drove ashore as they were outward bound from Liverpool. Several of these vessels, Ceres among them, were got off and brought back to dock in Liverpool as they had been damaged.

At some point John Williams became Ceres's captain. On 6 August Ceres, of Liverpool, Williams, master, arrived off the Windward Coast of Africa.

== Loss ==
Lloyd's List reported on 20 March 1807 that Ceres, of Liverpool, Williams, master, had capsized off Cape Mesurado. She was bound for the West Indies with a full cargo of captives. Thirteen of her crew were saved. Captain John Williams was reported to have been among the people drowned. This was his first voyage as master of an enslaving ship.

In 1807, 12 British enslaving vessels were lost. Six were lost in the middle passage between Africa and the West Indies.

During the period 1793 to 1807, war, rather than maritime hazards or resistance by the captives, was the greatest cause of vessel losses among British enslaving vessels.
