= HMS Wolf (1804) =

British sloop-of-war (1804–1806)

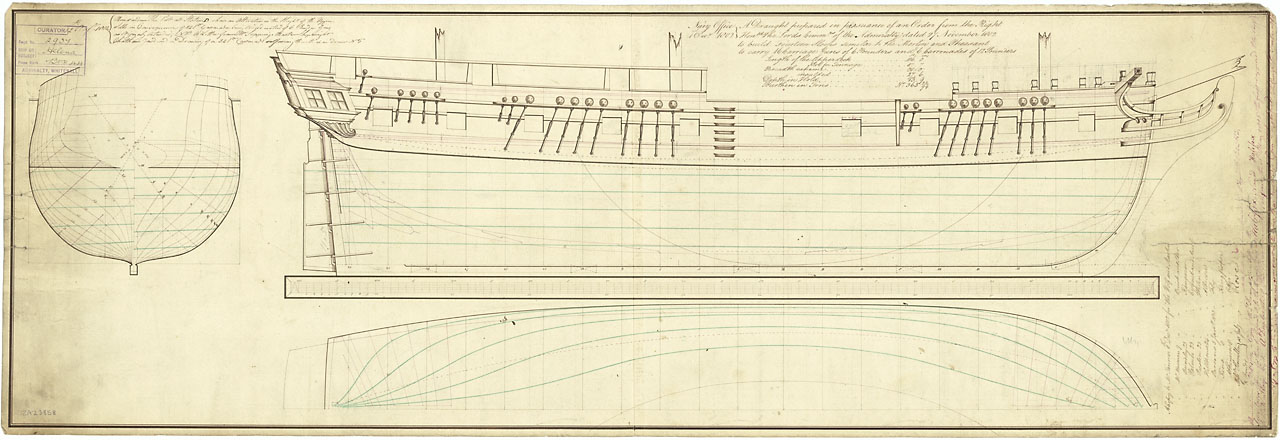
- Wolf

History

United Kingdom
- Name: HMS Wolf
- Ordered: 27 November 1802
- Builder: Benjamin Tanner, Dartmouth
- Laid down: April 1803
- Launched: 4 August 1804
- Fate: Wrecked 4 September 1806

General characteristics
- Class & type: Merlin-class sloop
- Tons burthen: 36667/94 bm
- Length: 105 ft 10 1/4 in (32.264 m) (overall); 87 ft 5 in (26.6 m) (keel)
- Beam: 28 ft 1 in (8.56 m)
- Depth of hold: 13 ft 9 in (4.19 m)
- Propulsion: Sails
- Complement: 121
- Armament: Upper deck:16 × 32-poundercarronades; QD:6 × 12-pounder carronades; Fc:2 × 12-pounder carronades

HMS Wolf (or Wolfe) was a Merlin-class sloop launched at Dartmouth in 1804. She captured or destroyed four small Spanish or French privateers before she was wrecked on 4 September 1806 in the Bahamas.

== Career ==
Commander John Astley Bennet commissioned Wolf in January 1805.

Commander George Charles Mackenzie assumed command of Wolf in April 1805, and sailed to the West Indies, arriving at Barbados from Cork on 23 July as escort to a fleet of merchantmen. From Barbados she sailed on to Jamaica.

On the evening of 9 October 1805, Mackenzie sailed Wolf to try to intercept two vessels sighted off Falmouth on the north coast of Jamaica. The first vessel Wolf came up with was an American that a Spanish privateer had just captured. Mackenzie dropped a boat to take possession of the American and then went in pursuit of the Spanish privateer which was sailing towards the shore. When the wind dropped, Wolf had to send a boarding party in two boats that boarded the privateer, which grounded on a reef. The privateer was Precieusa, a new cutter armed with three small guns, under the command of Galana Garsa. She was six days out of Santiago de Cuba. Five of her crew of 23 escaped in a canoe before the boarding party arrived. The British were nable to get Precieusa off the reef and she went to pieces soon after.

The American vessel was probably Experiment, Moncrief, master, which had been sailing from Falmouth to Montego Bay and New York when she had been taken and retaken.

On 2 January 1806 HMS Malabar and Wolf captured the French privateer schooners Régulateur and Napoléon in Port Azaraderos, Cuba. The port was protected by a double reef of rocks so Captain Hall of Malabar sent the master of Malabar in a boat to find a passage. Once a passage was found, rather than go in to capture the vessels, Wolf came in, but stopped about a quarter of a mile away from them. She then engaged the privateers for almost two hours until their crews abandoned their vessels, landed, and escaped into the woods. Then Wolf and Malabar sent in their boats to take possession. Wolf had two men killed in the action and four men wounded, one of them a prisoner.

One of the privateers, Régulateur was armed with a brass 18-pounder, and four 6-pounder guns, and had 80 men. (Note: Régulateur was a privateer schooner from Saint-Domingue or Cuba commissioned in 1803, and recommissioned in Guadeloupe in 1805. She had sustained one man killed and two wounded in the engagement. When she foundered, three more of her crew died.) The other, Napoléon, was armed with one long 9-pounder, two 12-pounder carronades, and two 4-pounder guns, and had a crew of 66 men. (Note: Napoléon was a privateer schooner commissioned in Saint-Domingue in December 1804. She was formerly the British prize British Domonica (?). She had sustained five men wounded in the action.) The British towed their prizes past the reefs, but in the process Régulateur sank. A marine from Malabar drowned when sank. Wolf and Napoléon arrived at Jamaica on 6 January.

Wolf later captured a French felucca, of unknown name. The felucca carried one gun; her crew escaped.

== Fate ==
Wolf was searching for the reported wreck of a French ship of the line wrecked north of Hispaniola. On 4 September 1804 Wolf was scouting around the western side of Heneagea when she grounded about 1.5 miles off shore on the southwest point of Heneagea. Despite effort to get her off, she fell on her side overnight. Fortunately, the whole of her officers and crew were saved. Mackenzie and his crew spent several days stripping the wreck before merchant ships took them off. Some crew members took this opportunity to desert. One of the merchant ships that rescued the crew was the Danish vessel Hope. Wolf's loss was blamed on a northward current and inaccurate charts.
