= Traveller (1792 ship) =

British merchant ship 1792–1806

History

Great Britain
- Name: Traveller
- Owner: Jos. Holt and Jn. Mellar
- Builder: G. and N. Langborne, Whitby
- Launched: 1792
- Fate: Lost 1806

General characteristics
- Tons burthen: 393 (bm)
- Armament: 6 × 6-pounder guns (1795); later 6 × 4-pounder guns

Traveller was a ship launched at Whitby in 1792. First she traded with the Baltic, then she was a London-based transport, next she traded between London and Quebec, and lastly she traded between England and the Baltic. She was lost in 1806 at Riga.

== Career ==
Traveller first entered Lloyd's Register in the 1793 volume.

Year	Master	Owner	Trade	Source & source
1793	S.Ellerby	J.Holt	Hull–Petersburg	LR
1798	Ellerby; Middleton	J.Holt	London–Petersburg; London transport	LR
1806	Middleton	J.Holt	London–Quebec	LR
1807	Dunning	J.Holt	Whitby–Baltic	Register of Shipping; small repairs 1805

== Fate ==
Traveller, Denning, master, arrived at Riga from London on 19 September 1806. Lloyd's List reported in November that Traveller, Denning, master, of Whitby, was one of four vessels reported to be on shore at Riga, all of which were totally lost. Another source gave the year of loss as 1807.
