= List of ship launches in 1798 =

The list of ship launches in 1798 includes a chronological list of some ships launched in 1798.

Date	Ship	Class	Builder	Location	Country	Notes
3 January	Africaine	Preneuse-class frigate		Rochefort	France	For French Navy.
4 January	Dover Castle	East Indiaman	John Wells	Deptford	Great Britain	For British East India Company.
17 January	Diomede	Diomede-class ship of the line	Thomas Pollard	Deptford Dockyard	Great Britain	For Royal Navy.
17 January	Kent	Ajax-class ship of the line	John Perry	Blackwall Yard	Great Britain	For Royal Navy.
17 January	Lord Duncan	East Indiaman	Perry	Blackwall	Great Britain	For British East India Company.
31 January	Heureuse	Heureuse-class frigate	Louis Crucy	Nantes	France	For French Navy.
1 February	Quatorze Juillet	Téméraire-class ship of the line		Lorient	France	For French Navy.
2 February	Northumberland	America-class ship of the line	Barnard	Deptford Wharf	Great Britain	For Royal Navy.
3 March	Ajax	Ajax-class ship of the line	John Randall	Rotherhithe	Great Britain	For Royal Navy.
3 March	Walpole	East Indiaman	Perry	Blackwall	Great Britain	For British East India Company.
19 March	Amphion	Fifth rate	James Betts	Mistleythorn	Great Britain	For Royal Navy.
19 March	Superb	Pompée-class ship of the line	Thomas Pitcher	Northfleet	Great Britain	For Royal Navy.
31 March	Calcutta	East Indiaman	John Wells	Deptford	Great Britain	For British East India Company.
31 March	Foudroyant	Third rate	Plymouth Dockyard	Plymouth	Great Britain	For Royal Navy.
2 April	Dragon	Third rate	William Wells	Rotherhithe	Great Britain	For Royal Navy.
16 April	Achille	Pompée-class ship of the line	Cleverley Bros.	Gravesend	Great Britain	For Royal Navy.
17 April	Pheasant	Merlin-class sloop	Edwards	Shoreham-by-Sea	Great Britain	For Royal Navy.
23 April	Kortenaer	Third rate	Peter Glavimans	Rotterdam	Batavian Republic	For Batavian Navy.
24 April	Frigate No.1	Kavkaz-class frigate	A. G. Stepanov	Kazan	Russia	For Imperial Russian Navy.
24 April	Frigate No.2	Kavkaz-class frigate	A. G. Stepanov	Kazan	Russia	For Imperial Russian Navy.
29 April	Aréthuse	Corvette	Antoine & Louis Crucy	Nantes	France	For French Navy.
April	Netley	Gunboat	Hobbs & Hellyer	Redbridge	Great Britain	For Royal Navy.
2 May	Ligurienne	Corvette	Honoré Garnier Saint-Maurice	Toulon	France	For French Navy.
2 May	Renown	America-class ship of the line	John Dudman	Deptford Wharf	Great Britain	For Royal Navy.
16 May	Porpoise	Storeship	Hill & Mellish	Limehouse	Great Britain	For Royal Navy.
19 May	Kildyuin	Armed storeship		Arkhangelsk	Russia	For Imperial Russian Navy.
19 May	Pospeshnyi	Fifth rate	G. Ignatyev	Arkhangelsk	Russia	For Imperial Russian Navy.
19 May	Schastlivyi	Arkhangel Mikhail-class frigate	G. Ignatyev	Arkhangelsk	Russia	For Imperial Russian Navy.
7 June	Portsmouth	Unrated	James Hacket	Kittery, Maine	United States	For United States Navy.
20 June	Sviatoi Mikhail	Sviatoi Pyotr-class ship of the line	A. S. Katsanov	Kherson	Russia	For Imperial Russian Navy.
28 June	Argonauta	Montañés-class ship of the line	Julian Martin de Retamosa	Ferrol	Spain	For Spanish Navy.
30 June	Johan de Witt	Third rate		Rotterdam	Batavian Republic	For Dutch East India Company.
June	Charles Mary Wentworth	Privateer	Snow Parker	Liverpool	(Kingdom of Great Britain) Nova Scotia	For Joseph Barss Sr., William Lawson, Snow Parker and Simeon Perkins.
14 July	Sarah Christiana	Merchantman	Randall, Brent & Sons	Rotherhithe	Great Britain	For Robert Charnock.
28 July	Wreker	Wreker-class ship of the line	R. Dorman	Amsterdam	Batavian Republic	For Batavian Navy.
11 August	Scammel	Topsail schooner	James Hackett	Kittery, Maine	United States	For Revenue Cutter Service.
13 August	Scaleby Castle	Full-rigged ship	Jamsetjee Bomanjee Wadia	Bombay	India	For Bruce, Fawcett & Co.
13 August	Valeureuse	Seine-class frigate	Charles-Henri Tellier	Le Havre	France	For French Navy.
18 August	Biche	Agile-class schooner		Brest	France	For French Navy.
2 September	Bogoiavlenie Gospodne	Aleksandr-class rowing frigate	A. I. Melikhov	Saint Petersburg	Russia	For Imperial Russian Navy.
9 September	Le Décidé	Privateer		Saint-Malo	France	For Havard et Compagnie.
11 September	Temeraire	Neptune-class ship of the line	Chatham Dockyard	Chatham	Great Britain	For Royal Navy.
12 September	Cuvera	East Indiaman		Calcutta	India	For Lambert, Ross & Co.
24 September	Feodosii Totemskii	Feodosii Totemskii-class frigate	G. Ignatyev	Arkhangelsk	Russia	For Imperial Russian Navy.
26 September	Penelope	Penelope-class frigate	George Parsons	Bursledon	Great Britain	For Royal Navy.
27 September	Etingdon	West Indiaman	Randall & Brent	Rotherhithe	Great Britain	For Hayman & Co.
27 September	Phoenix	Merchantman	Randall & Brent	Rotherhithe	Great Britain	For Hibbert & Co.
12 October	Merrimack	Sixth rate	Association of Newburyport Shipwrights	Newburyport, Massachusetts	United States	Presented to United States Navy.
20 October	Diadem	Sloop-of-war	Almon Hill & Sons	Limehouse	Great Britain	For Royal Navy.
25 October	Harriet	Merchantman	Lowdon	Pictou	(Kingdom of Great Britain) Nova Scotia	For private owner.
October	Athénien	Third rate	La Valette	Valetta	(France) Malta	For French Navy.
October	Foudroyant	Privateer		Bordeaux	France	For private owner.
6 December	Charlton	East Indiaman	Humble	Liverpool	Great Britain	For British East India Company.
8 December	Asia	East Indiaman	Humble	Liverpool	Great Britain	For British East India Company.
10 December	Preston	East Indiaman	Frances Barnard, Son, & Roberts	Deptford	Great Britain	For British East India Company.
22 December	Argonaute	Téméraire-class ship of the line	Pierre-Elisabeth Rolland	Lorient	France	For French Navy.
22 December	Ateş Feşan	Sixth rate	Jacques Balthazar Brun de Sainte Catherine	Constantinople	Ottoman Empire	For Ottoman Navy.
22 December	Saika Bar	Sixth rate	Jacques Balthazar Brun de Sainte Catherine	Constantinople	Ottoman Empire	For Ottoman Navy.
22 December	Tavus-i Bahri	Second rate	Jacques Balthazar Brun de Sainte Catherine	Constantinople	Ottoman Empire	For Ottoman Navy.
Unknown date	Adamant	Merchantman			Great Britain	For M. Warren.
Unknown date	Admiral Duncan	Merchantman	Edward Mosley	North Shields	Great Britain	For Mr. Holand.
Unknown date	Anacréon	Privateer		Dunkirk	France	For private owner.
Unknown date	Andersons	Slave ship		Poole	Great Britain	For John Anderson.
Unknown date	Apollo	Merchantman		Bermuda	(Kingdom of Great Britain) Bermuda	For private owner.
Unknown date	Argus	Privateer		Bordeaux	France	For private owner.
Unknown date	Backhouse	Slave ship		Dartmouth	Great Britain	For Daniel Backhouse & John Tarleton.
Unknown date	Baltimore	Frigate	Joseph Caverley	Baltimore, Maryland	United States	For United States Navy.
Unknown date	Berwick Packet	Smack		Berwick upon Tweed	Great Britain	For Mr. Patterson.
Unknown date	Betsey	Sloop	Nicholas Bools & William Good	Bridport	Great Britain	For William Good and others.
Unknown date	Britannia	West Indiaman		Kirkcaldy	Great Britain	For Mr. M'Neil.
Unknown date	Bush & Dreghorn	Merchantman		Leith	Great Britain	For private owner.
Unknown date	Chance	East Indiaman			India	For British East India Company.
Unknown date	Charleston	Row galley		Charleston, South Carolina	United States	For United States Navy.
Unknown date	Comet	Brig		Bombay Dockyard	India	For Bombay Marine.
Unknown date	Courageaux	Privateer			France	For private owner.
Unknown date	Diamond	Merchantman	Patrick Beatson	Quebec City	(Kingdom of Great Britain) Lower Canada	For Beatson & Co.
Unknown date	Doggersbank	Third rate		Rotterdam	Batavian Republic	For Batavian Navy.
Unknown date	Dover	Gunboat		Woolwich Dockyard	Great Britain	For Royal Navy.
Unknown date	Eagle	Schooner		Philadelphia, Pennsylvania	United States	For Revenue Cutter Service
Unknown date	Earl St Vincent	Merchantman	=	Gatcombe	Great Britain	For Wade & Co.
Unknown date	Earl St Vincent	Merchantman		Great Yarmouth	Great Britain	For J. Sayers.
Unknown date	Elizabeth	Merchantman		Hamburg	Hamburg	For B. Bosen & Co.
Unknown date	Ellice	Merchantman		Bermuda	(Kingdom of Great Britain) Bermuda	For private owner.
Unknown date	Experiment	Merchantman	Thomas Haw	Stockton-on-Tees	Great Britain	For Robert Wigram.
Unknown date	Flora	Merchantman		Great Yarmouth	Great Britain	For Mr. Heathfield.
Unknown date	Fowey	Merchantman			Great Britain	For private owner.
Unknown date	Ganges	Merchantman		Philadelphia, Pennsylvania	United States	For private owner.
Unknown date	Governor Davie	Full-rigged ship			United States	For United States Navy.
Unknown date	Governor Jay	Full-rigged ship			United States	For United States Navy.
Unknown date	Governor Williams	Full-rigged ship			United States	For United States Navy.
Unknown date	Guêpe	Sloop-of-war		Bordeaux	France	For French Navy.
Unknown date	Happy Return	Sloop	Nicholas Bools & William Good	Bridport	Great Britain	For William Barnes, Joseph Dason, William Ketteridge and Simon Lee.
Unknown date	Harmony	West Indiaman		Lancaster	Great Britain	For Mr. Ritchie
Unknown date	Hersteller	Third rate		Rotterdam	Batavian Republic	For Batavian Navy.
Unknown date	Highland Chief	Merchantman		Calcutta	India	For Lennox & Co.
Unknown date	Huit Amis	Privateer		Bordeaux	France	For private owner.
Unknown date	Hvide Ørn	Frigate	Frantz Hohlenberg	Nyholm	Denmark-Norway	For Dano-Norwegian Navy.
Unknown date	Indian Chief	Merchantman		Calcutta	India	For Mr. Thompson
Unknown date	Infatigable	Privateer		Nantes	France	For private owner.
Unknown date	La Cantabré	Privateer		Bayonne	France	For private owner.
Unknown date	La Résolue	Privateer			France	For private owner.
Unknown date	La Ressource	Privateer			France	For private owner.
Unknown date	Le Baret	Privateer			France	For private owner.
Unknown date	Le Bordelais	Privateer			France	For private owner.
Unknown date	Le Dix Août	Privateer		Guadeloupe	(France) Guadeloupe	For private owner.
Unknown date	Le Sauveur	Privateer		Guadeloupe	(France) Guadeloupe	For private owner.
Unknown date	Le Scoevola	Privateer			France	For private owner.
Unknown date	Le Vigilant	Privateer		Dunkirk	France	For private owner.
Unknown date	L'Intrepide	Privateer		Guadeloupe	(France) Guadeloupe	For private owner.
Unknown date	L'Invariable	Privateer			France	For private owner.
Unknown date	L'Invincible Général Bonaparte	Privateer		Bordeaux	France	For private owner.
Unknown date	Lord Duncan	Merchantman	Thomas King	Dover	Great Britain	For private owner.
Unknown date	Lord Duncan	Merchantman			(Kingdom of Great Britain) New Brunswick	For private owner.
Unknown date	Lord Duncan	Merchantman		Sunderland	Great Britain	For private owner.
Unknown date	Lord Nelson	Slave ship		Liverpool	Great Britain	For James Bold and Robert Bibby.
Unknown date	Maria	West Indiaman	John Smith	Gainsborough	Great Britain	For private owner.
Unknown date	La Détérminee	Privateer		Bordeaux	France	For private owner.
Unknown date	Mars	Privateer		Bordeaux	France	For private owner.
Unknown date	Menba-ı Nusret	Third rate			Ottoman Empire	For Ottoman Navy.
Unknown date	Mesudiye	First rate	Jean-Baptiste Benoit	Constantinople	Ottoman Empire	For Ottoman Navy.
Unknown date	Milbrook	Gunboat	Hobbs & Hellyer	Redbridge	Great Britain	For Royal Navy.
Unknown date	Mosambique	Privateer			France	For private owner.
Unknown date	Neptunus	Third rate		Rotterdam	Batavian Republic	For Batavian Navy.
Unknown date	Nile}	Merchantman	Edward Mosley & Co.	Howdon	Great Britain	For Francis & Thomas Hurry.
Unknown date	Norfolk	Sloop		Norfolk Island	(Kingdom of Great Britain) Norfolk Island	For John Hunter.
Unknown date	Norfolk	Brig		Norfolk, Virginia	United States	For United States Navy.
Unknown date	Philip Dundas	Brig		Bombay	India	For Bombay Pilot Service.
Unknown date	Pickering	Topsail schooner		Newburyport, Massachusetts	United States	For United States Navy.
Unknown date	Pinckney	Full-rigged ship			United States	For United States Navy.
Unknown date	Protector	Full-rigged ship			United States	For United States Navy.
Unknown date	Psyché	Privateer	Antoine & Louis Crucy	Nantes	France	For private owner.
Unknown date	Redbridge	Gunboat	Hobbs & Hellyer	Redbridge	Great Britain	For Royal Navy.
Unknown date	Richmond	Brig		Norfolk, Virginia	United States	For United States Navy.
Unknown date	Sans Pareille	Privateer		La Ciotat	France	For private owner.
Unknown date	Sarah	Merchantman	John & Philip Laing	Sunderland	Great Britain	For Mr. Scaling.
Unknown date	Savannah	Row galley	John Patterson	Savannah, Georgia	United States	For United States Navy.
Unknown date	South Carolina	Full-rigged ship			United States	For United States Navy.
Unknown date	Speedy	Gunboat	Kingston Royal Naval Dockyard	Kingston	(Kingdom of Great Britain) Upper Canada	For Provincial Marine.
Unknown date	Sprightly	Sloop	Nicholas Bools & William Good	Bridport	Great Britain	For Nicholas Bools and others.
Unknown date	Spring	Brig	J. Blenkinsop	Monkwearmouth	Great Britain	For J. Blenkinsop.
Unknown date	Telegraph	Brig			Great Britain	For private owner.
Unknown date	Tom	West Indiaman		Whitby	Great Britain	For private owner.
Unknown datedate	Trelawney Planter	Merchantman			(Kingdom of Great Britain) New Brunswick	For Mr. Fleming.
Unknown date	Tyne	Merchantman	Ann Brodrick	South Shields	Great Britain	For Mr. Simpson.
Unknown date	Union	Schooner	Nicholas Bools & William Good	Bridport	Great Britain	For Philip Head Jr., William Head and John Otton.
Unknown date	Vertumnus	Merchantman	John & Philip Laing	Sunderland	Great Britain	For J. Poditch.
Unknown date	Waldemar	Third rate		Copenhagen	Denmark-Norway	For Dano-Norwegian Navy.
Unknown date	Name unknown	Merchantman		Philadelphia, Pennsylvania	United States	For private owner.
Unknown date	Name unknown	Merchantman		Batavia	(Batavian Republic) Netherlands East Indies	For private owner.
Unknown date	Name unknown	Merchantman			France	For private owner.
Unknown date	Name unknown	Merchantman		France or Spain	Unknown	For private owner.
Unknown date	Name unknown	Merchantman			Spain	For private owner.
Unknown date	Name unknown	Ketch			France	For private owner.
Unknown date	Name unknown	Merchantman		Boston, Massachusetts	United States	For private owner.
Unknown date	Name unknown	Schooner			France	For private owner.
Unknown date	Name unknown	Snow		New York	United States	For private owner.
