= Earl St Vincent (ship) =

In the early 1800s several ships were named Earl St Vincent for John Jervis, 1st Earl of St Vincent:

- Earl St Vincent (1798 Gatcombe ship) was launched at Gatcombe in 1798. She made one voyage for the British East India Company (EIC).
- Earl St Vincent (1798 Yarmouth ship) was launched at Yarmouth in 1798. She was last listed in 1846.
- Earl St Vincent (1799 EIC ship) was launched in 1799 as an East Indiaman. She made seven voyages for the EIC before she was sold for breaking up in 1813.
- Earl St. Vincent (1800 ship) was a merchant ship built at Topsham, England in 1800. Between 1818 and 1823 she made three voyages transporting convicts from England and Ireland to Australia. She was last listed in 1833.
- Earl St Vincent (1803 ship) was a French ship launched in 1794 that was British captured and that became a British merchantman. Early in her career she was captured by a French privateer, but recaptured. She was last listed in 1814.

== See also ==
- Hired armed cutter Earl St Vincent
