= HMS Illustrious (1803) =

Ship of the line of the Royal Navy

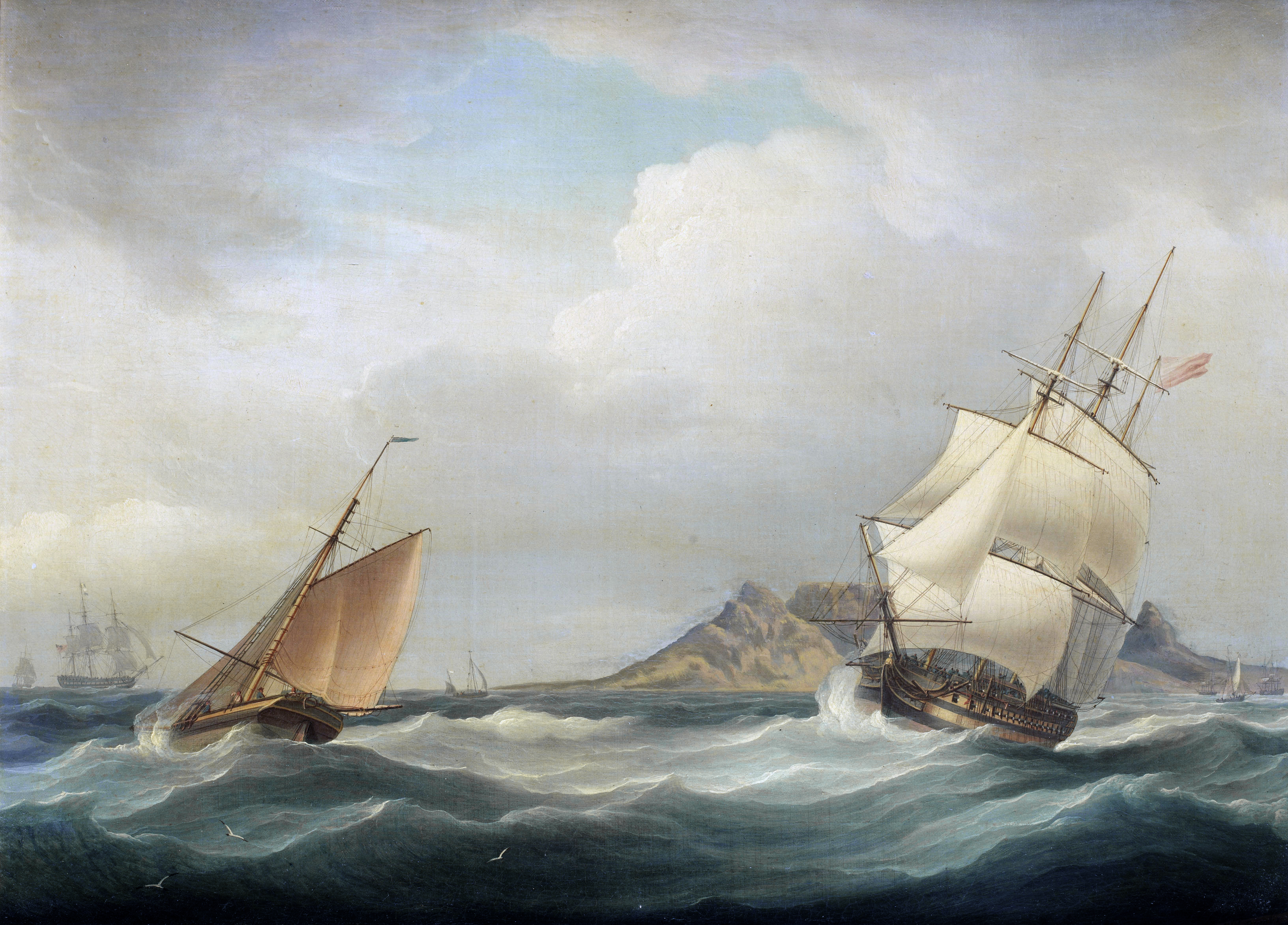
- HMS Illustrious heading out of Table Bay (Thomas Whitcombe, cira 1811)

History

United Kingdom
- Name: HMS Illustrious
- Ordered: 4 February 1800
- Builder: Randall, Rotherhithe
- Launched: 3 September 1803
- Fate: Broken up, 1868

General characteristics
- Class & type: Fame-class ship of the line
- Tons burthen: 1746 (bm)
- Length: 175 ft (53 m) (gundeck)
- Beam: 47 ft 6 in (14.48 m)
- Depth of hold: 20 ft 6 in (6.25 m)
- Propulsion: Sails
- Sail plan: Full-rigged ship
- Armament: Gundeck: 28 × 32-pounder guns; Upper gundeck: 28 × 18-pounder guns; QD: 14 × 9-pounder guns; Fc: 4 × 9-pounder guns

HMS Illustrious, a 74-gun third rate ship of the line and the second of that name, was built by Randall & Brent at Rotherhithe where her keel was laid in February 1801. Launched on 3 September 1803, she was completed at Woolwich.

== Service ==
She was first commissioned for the Channel Fleet under Captain Sir Charles Hamilton and was involved in the Battle of the Basque Roads in 1809, in which she won a battle honour, and in the expeditions against the docks at Antwerp and render the Schelde unnavigable to French ships. On 22 November 1810, Illustrious was amongst the fleet that captured Île de France on 3 December. (Note: The Admiral's share of the prize money was £2650 5s 2d. A first-class share was worth £278 19s 5¾d; a sixth-class share, that of an ordinary seaman, was worth £3 7s 6¼d. A fourth and final payment was made in July 1828. A first-class share was worth £29 19s 5¼d; a sixth-class share was worth 8s 2½d. This time, Admiral Bertie received £314 14s 3½d.) She then took part in the Invasion of Java (1811) in Indonesia. She was refitted at Portsmouth (1813–17) and then laid up in reserve until recommissioned in 1832. She was laid up again in 1845, and later used as a guard ship, a hospital ship and, lastly, in 1854 she became a gunnery training ship and continued as one until she was broken up in 1868 in Portsmouth.

== Figurehead ==
When the ship was broken up the figurehead was saved and can now be seen on display at the National Museum of the Royal Navy, Portsmouth.
