= HMS York (1807) =

Ship of the line of the Royal Navy

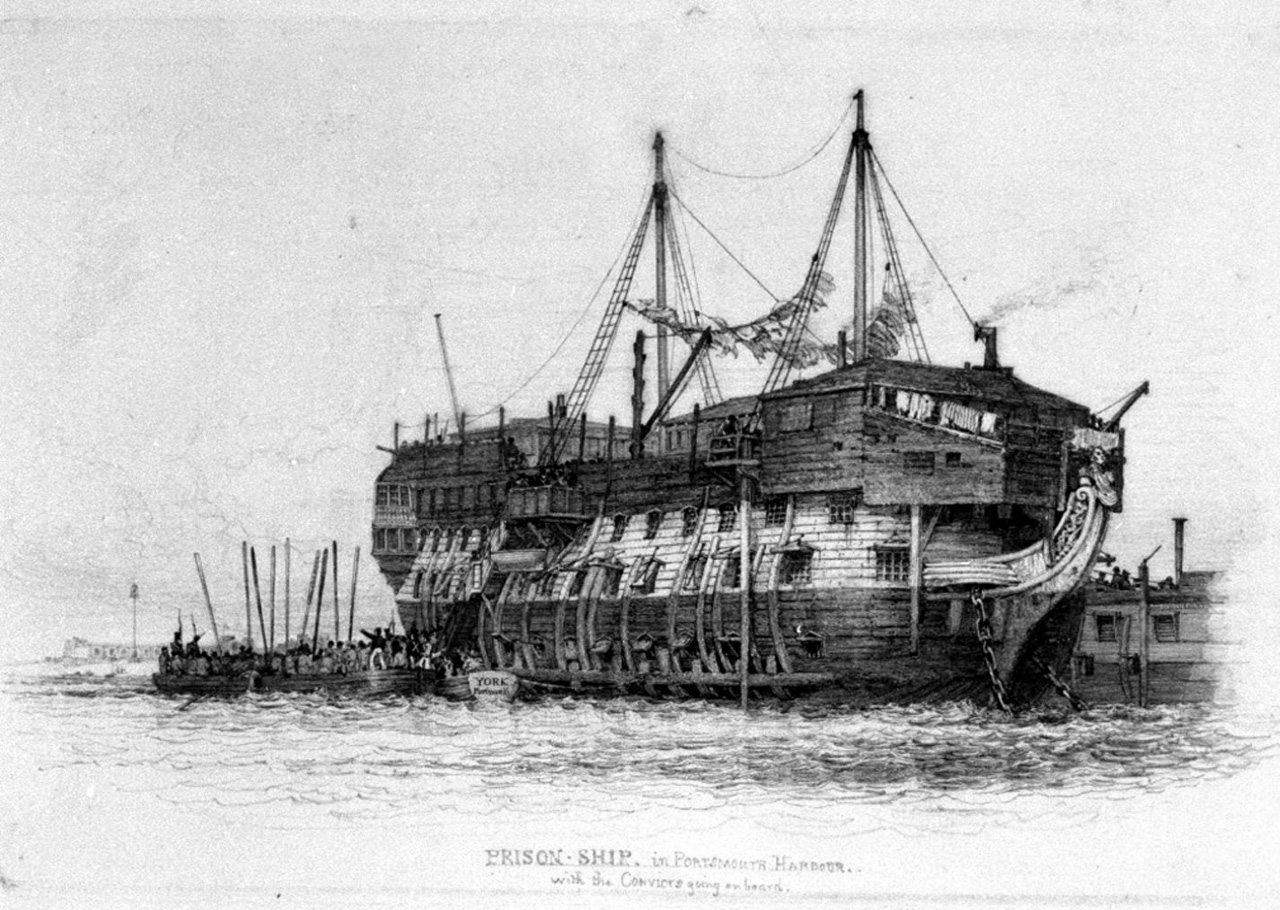
- 1829 engraving of York as a prison ship in Portsmouth Harbour

History

United Kingdom
- Name: HMS York
- Ordered: 31 January 1805
- Builder: Brent, Rotherhithe
- Laid down: August 1805
- Launched: 7 July 1807
- Fate: Broken up, 1854
- Notes: Prison ship from 1819

General characteristics
- Class & type: Fame-class ship of the line
- Tons burthen: 1743 (bm)
- Length: 175 ft (53 m) (gundeck)
- Beam: 47 ft 6 in (14.48 m)
- Depth of hold: 20 ft 6 in (6.25 m)
- Propulsion: Sails
- Sail plan: Full-rigged ship
- Armament: Gundeck: 28 × 32-pounder guns; Upper gundeck: 28 × 18-pounder guns; QD: 4 × 12-pounder guns + 10 × 32-pounder carronades; Fc: 2 × 12-pounder guns + 2 × 32-pounder carronades; Poop deck: 6 × 18-pounder carronades

HMS York was a 74-gun third-rate ship of the line of the Royal Navy, built at Rotherhithe by the contract firm Samuel & Daniel Brent, and launched on 7 July 1807. She saw service during the Napoleonic Wars, though is best known for her time spent as a prison ship. She was broken up in March 1854.

== Service history ==
HMS York was one of many British warships ordered after they were most needed. Although the major naval battles of the Napoleonic Wars had already occurred by the time of her launching, York was employed on some notable campaigns.

After her launch, York was under the command of Captain Robert Barton, and as part of Sir Samuel Hood's squadron, she participated in the occupation of Madeira.

In 1809, York was on the West India Station, and was involved in the capture of Martinique. In April a strong French squadron arrived at the Îles des Saintes, south of Guadeloupe. There they were blockaded until 14 April, when a British force under Major-General Frederick Maitland and Captain Philip Beaver in Acasta, invaded and captured the islands. York was among the naval vessels that shared in the proceeds of the capture of the islands. (Note: The prize agent for a number of the vessels involved, Henry Abbott, went bankrupt. In May 1835 there was a final payment of a dividend from his estate. A first-class share was worth 10s 2¾d; a sixth-class share, that of an ordinary seaman, was worth 1d. Seventh-class (landsmen) and eighth-class (boys) shares were fractions of a penny, too small to pay.)

In July–August 1809 York was involved in the disastrous landings at Walcheren. York was later with the Mediterranean Squadron off Toulon.

On 17 December 1813 York captured Marie Antoinette. (Note: A first-class share was worth £230 8s 2d; a sixth-class share was worth £1 10s 1½d.)

== Fate ==
In 1819, York entered Portsmouth harbour, where she was stripped of her masts and guns, and converted into a prison ship. HMS York is best remembered in this state, thanks to a contemporary drawing by Edward William Cooke, which shows her fully converted, and with laundry above her decks where sails once would have been. She would have typically contained approximately 500 convicts.

After many years in this harbour service, she was broken up in March 1854.
