= Admiral Pakenham =

Admiral Pakenham may refer to:

- John Pakenham (1743–1807), British Royal Navy vice admiral
- Thomas Pakenham (Royal Navy officer) (1757–1836), British Royal Navy admiral
- William Pakenham (Royal Navy officer) (1861–1933), British Royal Navy admiral
