= HMS Kent (1798) =

74-gun third-rate ship of the line of the Royal Navy built in the late 18th century

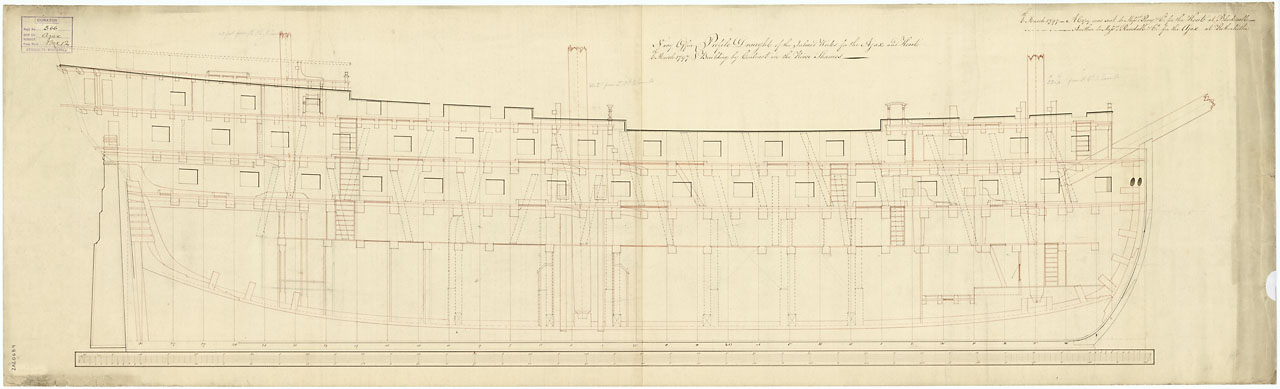
- HMS Kent (1798) image

History

Great Britain
- Name: HMS Kent
- Ordered: 30 April 1795
- Builder: John Perry and Company Blackwall Yard
- Laid down: October 1795
- Launched: 17 January 1798
- Commissioned: 3 April 1798 at Woolwich Dockyard
- In service: 1798–1804; 1805–1809; 1829–1842; 1855–1881
- Honours and awards: Naval General Service Medal with clasp "Egypt"
- Fate: Broken up, 1881

General characteristics 1798–1817
- Class & type: Ajax-class ship of the line
- Tons burthen: 1,963 73/94 (bm)
- Length: 182 ft 8 in (55.68 m) (gundeck); 149 ft 11 in (45.69 m) (keel)
- Beam: 49 ft 7.5 in (15.126 m)
- Depth of hold: 21 ft 5 in (6.53 m)
- Sail plan: Full-rigged ship
- Complement: 690
- Armament: Gundeck: 28 × 32-pdrs; Upper deck: 28 × 24-pdrs; QD: 14 × 9-pdrs; Fc: 4 × 9-pdrs

General characteristics 1820–1881
- Class & type: Ajax-class ship of the line
- Tons burthen: 2,009 62/94 (bm)
- Length: 184 ft 2.5 in (56.147 m) (gundeck); 150 ft 10.5 in (45.987 m) (keel)
- Beam: 50 ft 0 in (15.24 m)
- Depth of hold: 21 ft 10 in (6.65 m)
- Sail plan: Full-rigged ship
- Armament: Gundeck: 28 × 32-pdrs; Upper gundeck: 28 × 24-pdrs; QD: 4 × 9-pdrs & 8 × 32-pdr carronades; Fc: 4 × 9-pdrs

HMS Kent was a 74-gun third-rate ship of the line of the Royal Navy, launched on 17 January 1798 at Blackwall Yard.

== Career ==
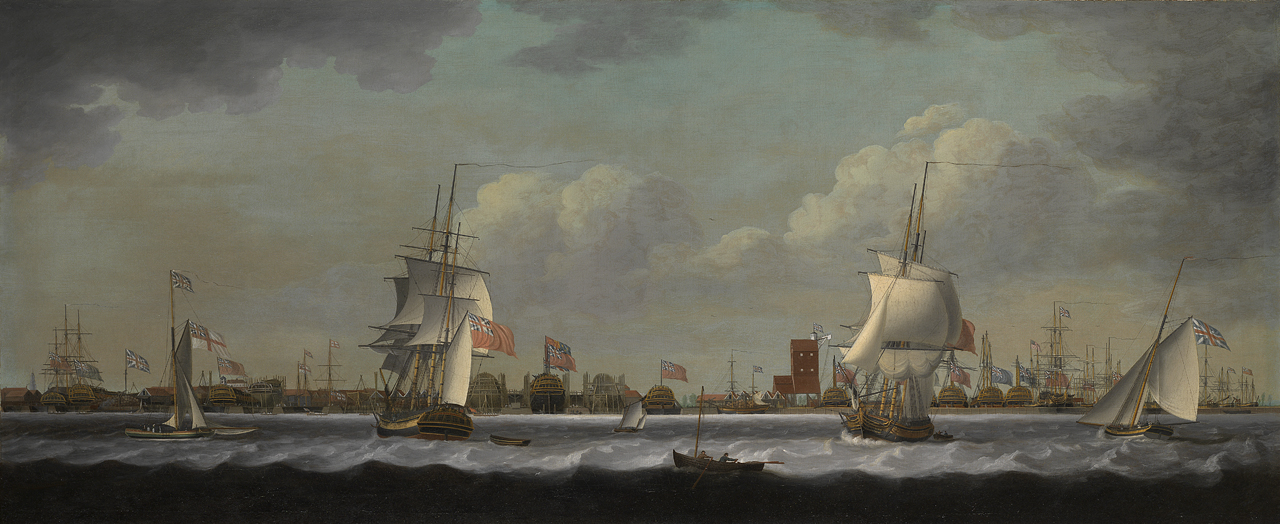
'View of Mr Perry's Yard, Blackwall, commemorating the launch of HM ship Kent

When Kent was launched on 17 January 1798, she was launched immediately after the East Indiaman Lord Duncan. Kent followed nearly the same course as Lord Duncan had taken with the result that Kent's stern ran into Lord Duncan's bow, doing great damage to both vessels. Both vessels then had to go back into dock to effect repairs.

On 9 May 1801, Kent, Hector and Cruelle unsuccessfully chased the French corvette Heliopolis, which eluded them and slipped into Alexandria. Because Kent served in the Navy's Egyptian campaign (8 March to 8 September 1801), her officers and crew qualified for the clasp "Egypt" to the Naval General Service Medal that the Admiralty authorised in 1850 for all surviving claimants. (Note: A first-class share of the prize money awarded in April 1823 was worth £34 2s 4d; a fifth-class share, that of a seaman, was worth 3s 11½d. The amount was small as the total had to be shared between 79 vessels and the entire army contingent.)

On 21 December 1801 reportedly dismasted in a gale in the vicinity of Malta.

On 13 December 1809, 350 sailors and 250 marines from Kent, and two other 74-gun third rates, Cambrian and Ajax, attacked Palamós. (The sloops Sparrowhawk and Minstrel covered the landing.) The landing party destroyed six of eight merchant vessels with supplies for the French army at Barcelona, as well as the vessels' escorts, a national ketch of 14 guns and 60 men and two xebecs of three guns and thirty men each. The vessels were lying inside the mole under the protection of 250 French troops, a battery of two 24-pounders, and a 13" mortar in a battery on a commanding height. Although the attack was successful, the withdrawal was not. The British lost 33 men killed, 89 wounded, and 86 taken prisoner, plus one seaman who took the opportunity to desert.

== Fate ==
Kent became a sheer hulk in 1856, and was broken up in 1881.
