= HMS Fame (1805) =

Ship of the line of the Royal Navy

- Fame

History

United Kingdom
- Name: HMS Fame
- Ordered: 15 October 1799
- Builder: Deptford Dockyard
- Laid down: 22 January 1802
- Launched: 8 October 1805
- Fate: Broken up, 1817

General characteristics
- Class & type: Fame-class ship of the line
- Tons burthen: 1745 (bm)
- Length: 175 ft (53 m) (gundeck)
- Beam: 47 ft 8 in (14.53 m)
- Depth of hold: 20 ft 6 in (6.25 m)
- Propulsion: Sails
- Sail plan: Full-rigged ship
- Armament: 74 guns: Gundeck: 28 × 32 pdrs; Upper gundeck: 28 × 18 pdrs; Quarterdeck: 14 × 9 pdrs; Forecastle: 4 × 9 pdrs

HMS Fame was a 74-gun third rate ship of the line of the Royal Navy, built at Deptford Dockyard. She was constructed on the same building slip as was HMS Courageux, her keel having been ordered to be laid down on it immediately after the other ship's launch on 26 March 1800. The first elements of her keel were finally laid down on 22 January 1802, and Fame was launched on 8 October 1805.

== Service ==
In November 1808, whilst under the command of Captain Bennet, Fame joined a squadron lying off Rosas, where Captain Lord Cochrane was assisting the Spanish in the defence of Castell de la Trinitat against the invading French army. Boats from Fame helped evacuate Cochrane's garrison forces after the fort's surrender on 5 December. On 4 March 1811, Argentine lawyer and journalist Mariano Moreno died on this ship while travelling on a diplomatic mission to England, his body was thrown into the water wrapped in a Unión Jack flag.

She returned from Guadeloupe to Portsmouth in October 1815, and then was duly sent to Le Havre.

== Fate ==
Fame was laid up in ordinary at Chatham in 1815. She was broken up in 1817.
