= HMS Ajax (1798) =

British ship of the line (1801–1807)

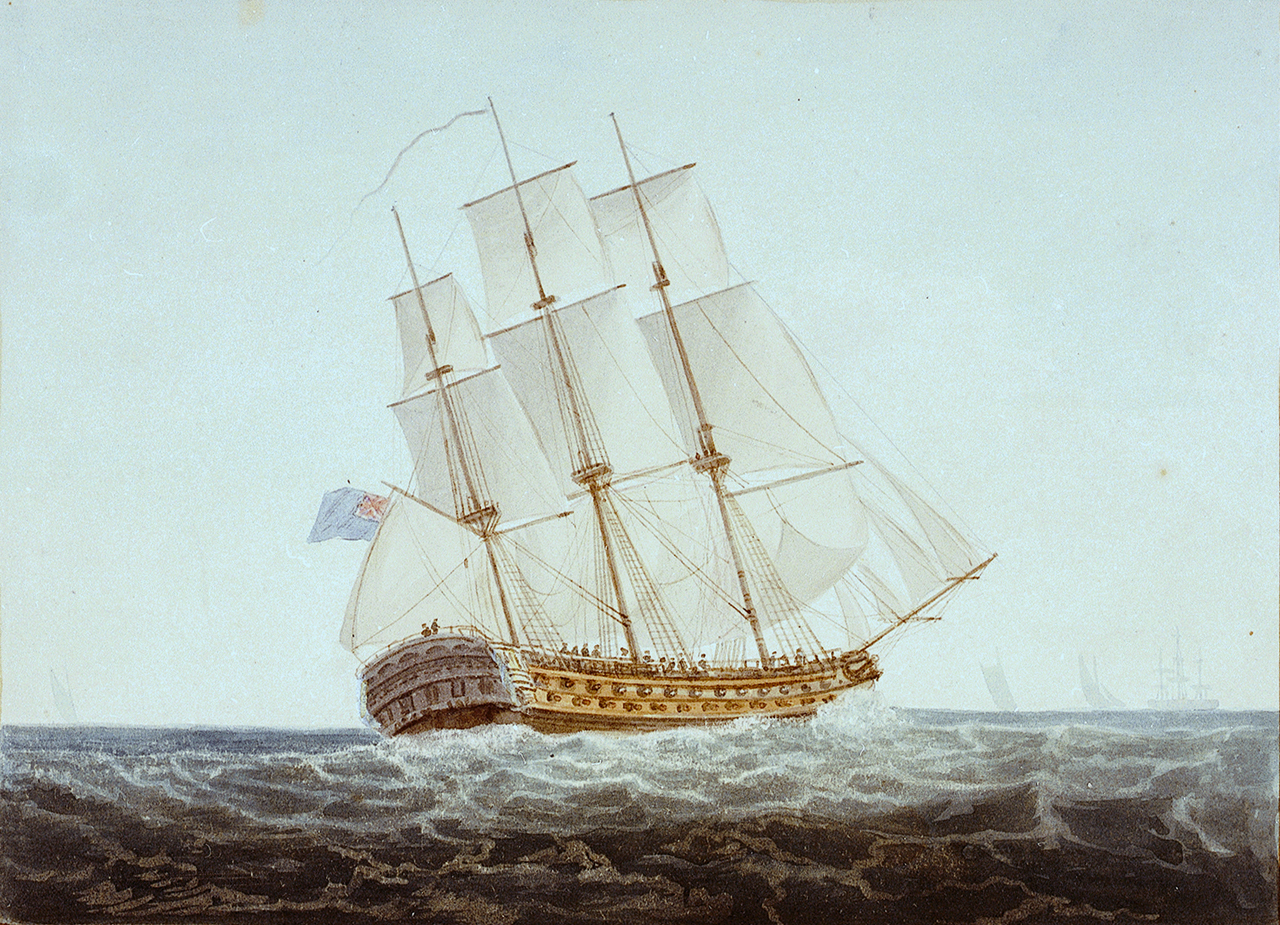
- Watercolour of Ajax

History
- Name: HMS Ajax
- Ordered: 30 April 1795
- Builder: Randall, Rotherhithe
- Laid down: September 1795
- Launched: 3 March 1798
- Commissioned: June 1798
- Honours and awards: Finisterre; Naval General Service Medal with clasps: "Egypt"; Trafalgar
- Fate: Accidentally burnt, 14 February 1807

General characteristics
- Class & type: Ajax-class ship of the line
- Tons burthen: 1,94346/94 (bm)
- Length: 182 ft 5 in (55.6 m) (gundeck); 149 ft 10 5/8 in (45.7 m) (keel)
- Beam: 49 ft 6 in (15.1 m)
- Depth of hold: 21 ft 3 in (6.5 m)
- Propulsion: Sails
- Sail plan: Full-rigged ship
- Armament: Gundeck: 28 × 32-pounder guns; Upper gundeck: 30 × 24-pounder guns; QD: 12 × 9-pounder guns; Fc: 4 × 9-pounder guns

HMS Ajax was an Ajax-class 74-gun third-rate ship of the line of the British Royal Navy. She was built by John Randall & Co of Rotherhithe and launched on the Thames on 3 March 1798. Ajax participated in the Egyptian operation of 1801, the Battle of Cape Finisterre in 1805 and the Battle of Trafalgar, before she was lost to a disastrous fire in 1807 just prior the Dardanelles operation.

== Egypt ==
Captain James Whitshed had been in charge of the vessel during her later construction stages from January 1798, but she was eventually commissioned in June 1798 under Captain John Holloway. A month later command passed to Captain John Pakenham, for Channel service. After a brief spell under Captain John Osborn in April 1799, Ajax was placed in May 1799 under the command of Captain Alexander Cochrane, who was to command her for two years.

On 9 January 1800 she captured the French privateer Avantageux in the Channel.

In 1801, Cochrane and Ajax participated in the Egyptian operations. On 31 January Ajax anchored at Marmorice on the coast of Karamania.

On 1 March, some 70 warships, together with transports carrying 16,000 troops, anchored in Aboukir Bay near Alexandria. Bad weather delayed disembarkation by a week, but on the 8th, Cochrane directed a landing by 320 boats, in double line abreast, which brought the troops ashore. French shore batteries opposed the landing, but the British were able to drive them back and by the next day Sir Ralph Abercromby's whole force was ashore. Ajax had two of her seamen killed in the landings.

The naval vessels provided a force of 1,000 seamen to fight alongside the army, with Sir Sidney Smith of the 74-gun HMS Tigre in command. On 13 March, Ajax lost one man killed and two wounded in an action on shore; on 21 March she lost two killed and two wounded.

After the Battle of Alexandria and the subsequent siege, Cochrane in Ajax, with the sixth rate HMS Bonne Citoyenne, sloop HMS Cynthia, the brig-sloops HMS Port Mahon and HMS Victorieuse, and three Turkish corvettes, were the first vessels to enter the harbour.

Because Ajax had served in the Egyptian campaign between 8 March 1801 and 2 September, her officers and crew qualified for the clasp "Egypt" to the Naval General Service Medal that the Admiralty authorised in 1850 to all surviving claimants. (Note: A first-class share of the prize money awarded in April 1823 was worth £34 2s 4d; a fifth-class share, that of a seaman, was worth 3s 11½d. The amount was small as the total had to be shared between 79 vessels and the entire army contingent.)

Ajax returned to Plymouth from Egypt on 8 June 1802 after the signing of the Treaty of Amiens.

== 1805 ==
In April, Admiral Lord Gardner sent Ajax, together with HMS Malta and HMS Terrible to reinforce Vice-Admiral Sir Robert Calder's squadron off Ferrol after a storm had reduced the squadron to only five ships of the line.

On 31 May 1805 Captain William Brown took command of Ajax. On 22 July, Calder's fleet of 15 sail of the line, two frigates, a cutter and a lugger was off Cape Finisterre when it encountered Admiral Pierre-Charles Villeneuve's combined Spanish-French fleet of 20 ships of the line, three large ships armed en flute, five frigates and two brigs.

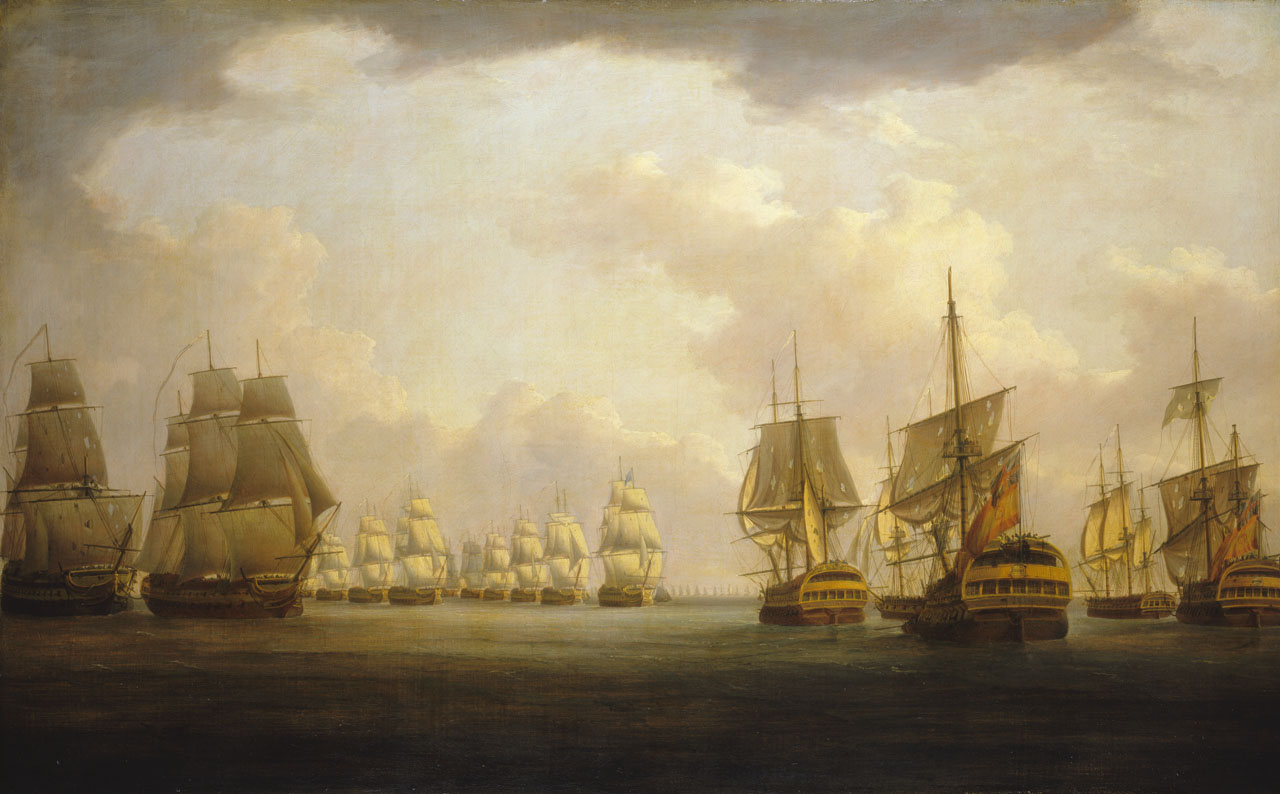
Battle of Cape Finisterre, by William Anderson, c. 1810

Calder sailed towards the French with his force. The battle lasted for more than four hours as the fleets became confused in the failing light and thick patchy fog, which prevented either side from gaining a decisive victory. Still, the British were able to capture two Spanish ships, the 80-gun San Rafael and the 74-gun Firme. The action cost Ajax two men killed and 16 wounded.

After undergoing repairs in Plymouth, on 18 September, Ajax and Thunderer, the latter under Captain William Lechmere, joined with Vice-Admiral Horatio Nelson in HMS Victory and sailed from Plymouth for Cádiz on 18 September. Captains Brown and Lechmere were later called as witnesses at the court martial of Sir Robert Calder for his failure to resume the battle the next day in the action in July. As a result, First Lieutenant John Pilfold commanded Ajax at the Battle of Trafalgar. Ajax was seventh in line in Nelson's column and she fired on both the French 74-gun Bucentaure and the Spanish 136-gun Santissima Trinidad. During the battle Ajax assisted HMS Orion in forcing the surrender of the French 74-gun Intrépide. Ajax lost two men killed and nine wounded during the battle.

A storm followed the battle and Ajax rescued seamen from ships in danger of sinking. Lieutenant Pilfold received the Trafalgar medal and a direct promotion to Post-captain in December. Although he missed the battle, Brown was still the official captain and so too received the Trafalgar medal. (Note: Brown was then made Commissioner, first of Malta dockyards and then of Sheerness dockyards, before being promoted to Rear-Admiral. Next, he became C.-in-C. Channel Islands. He died of yellow fever in 1814 while C.-in-C. Jamaica.) In 1847, the Admiralty awarded the Naval General Service Medal with clasp "Trafalgar" to all surviving claimants from the battle.

After Trafalgar, Ajax was at the blockade of Cádiz. On 25 November, Thunderer detained the Ragusan ship Nemesis, which was sailing from Isle de France to Leghorn, Italy, with a cargo of spice, indigo dye, and other goods. Ajax shared the prize money with ten other British warships.

== Loss of Ajax ==
From January 1806 Ajax was under the command of Captain Henry Blackwood. On 1 February 1807 Ajax joined Admiral Sir John Duckworth's squadron at Malta to participate in the Dardanelles operation. Five days prior to the operation, an accidental fire destroyed Ajax. The fire began on the evening of 14 February 1807 while Ajax was anchored off Tenedos. The fire began in the bread-room where the purser and his assistant had negligently left a light burning. As the fire burned out of control, the officers and crew were forced to take to the water. Although 380 people were rescued, 250 lost their lives that night, including many of the crewmen who had been at Trafalgar. Ajax burned through the night and then drifted on to the island of Tenedos where she blew up the following morning. Several theories for the cause of the fire were advanced including spontaneous combustion of the ship's coal and a spark falling into hay stored in the cockpit. A court martial cleared Captain Blackwood.

== Horsham Museum ==
The Shelley Gallery at Horsham Museum, Horsham, United Kingdom, displays a model of Ajax.
