= Mars-class ship of the line =

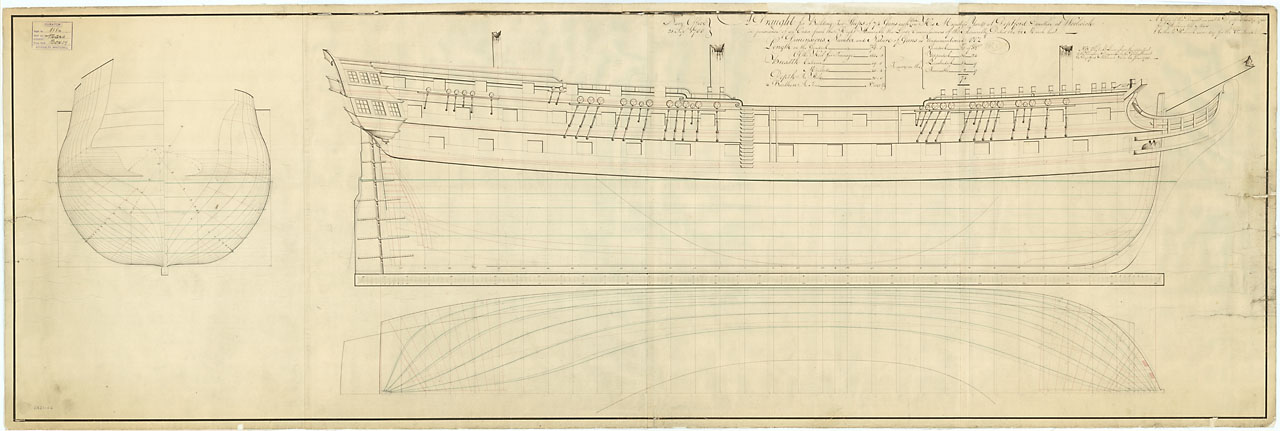
- Mars (1794), Centaur (1797)

Class overview
- Name: Mars
- Operators: Royal Navy
- Preceded by: Courageux class
- Succeeded by: Ajax class
- In service: 25 October 1794–1823
- Completed: 2

General characteristics
- Type: Ship of the line
- Length: 176 ft (54 m) (gundeck); 144 ft 3 in (43.97 m) (keel)
- Beam: 49 ft (15 m)
- Propulsion: Sails
- Armament: 74 guns: Gundeck: 28 × 32 pdrs; Upper gundeck: 30 × 24 pdrs; Quarterdeck: 12 × 9 pdrs; Forecastle: 4 × 9 pdrs
- Notes: Ships in class include: Mars, Centaur

The Mars-class ships of the line were a class of two 74-gun third rates of the large class ships of the line, designed for the Royal Navy by Sir John Henslow.

The two ships of the Mars class were the first large 74s since the Valiant class of 1759, carrying the heavier armament of 24 pdrs on their upper decks, as opposed to the 18 pdrs of the middling and common classes.

== Ships ==
- HMS Mars

Builder: Deptford Dockyard
Ordered: 17 January 1788
Launched: 25 October 1794
Fate: Broken up, 1823

- HMS Centaur

Builder: Woolwich Dockyard
Ordered: 17 January 1788
Launched: 14 March 1797
Fate: Broken up, 1819
