= Etingdon (1798 ship) =

History

Great Britain
- Name: Etingdon
- Owner: 1799:Hayman & Co.; 1807:Cuthbert & Co., London
- Builder: Randall & Brent, Rotherhithe
- Launched: 27 September 1798
- Fate: Foundered 21 March 1810

General characteristics
- Tons burthen: 404 (bm)
- Armament: 1799: 2 × 12-pounder + 4 × 9-pounder + 2 × 6-pounder guns; 1809:4 × 12-pounder guns + 6 × 12-pounder guns "of the New Construction"

Etingdon was launched in 1798 as a Jamaicaman (West Indiaman). She first appeared in Lloyd's Register (LR) in 1799 under the name Elingdon with T. Wilson, master, Hayman, owner, and trade London–Jamaica.

Between 17 December 1806 and 10 June 1807 Captain J. Haman sailed Etingdon to the Cape of Good Hope. She was carrying stores for the British government. Lloyd's Register for 1809 showed Etingdon with J. Hyman, master, changing to Kennedy, Hayman, owner, and trade London–Cape of Good Hope.

On 27 January 1809, Etingdon, Kennedy, master, sailed from Jamaica for London, in company with a number of other merchantmen.

On 21 March 1810 Etingdon foundered off Havana, Cuba. Her crew were rescued. She was on a voyage from Jamaica to London.
