= Fame-class ship of the line =

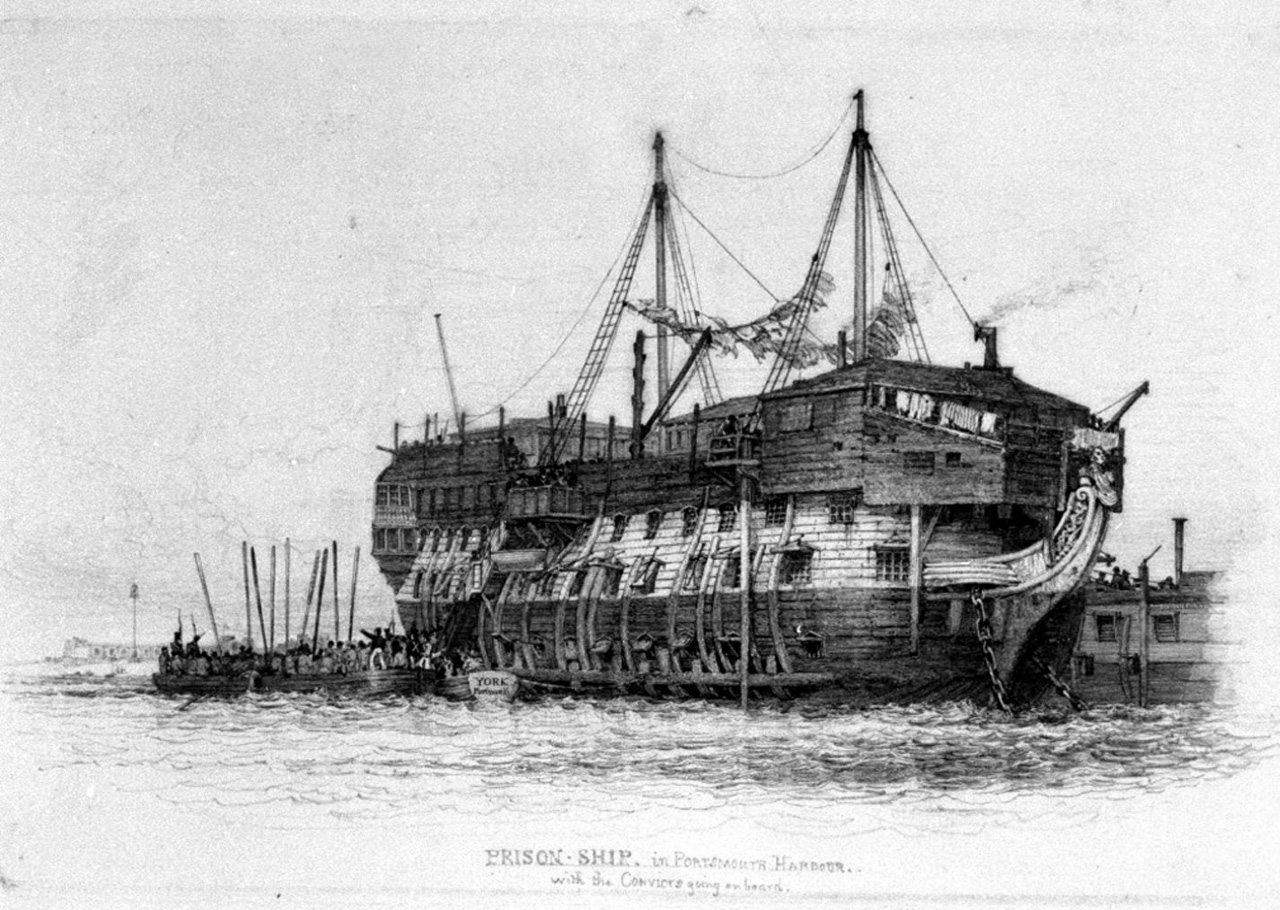
- 1829 engraving of HMS York as a prison ship

Class overview
- Name: Fame
- Operators: Royal Navy
- Preceded by: America class
- Succeeded by: Repulse class
- In service: 17 June 1802 – 1868
- Completed: 9
- Lost: 1

General characteristics
- Type: Ship of the line
- Length: Fame: 175 ft (53.3 m) (gundeck); 144 ft (43.9 m) (keel); Rest of first batch: 175 ft (53.3 m) (gundeck); 144 ft 1⅝ in (43.9 m) (keel); Second batch: 175 ft 6 in (53.5 m) (gundeck); 144 ft 4⅝ in (44.0 m) (keel)
- Beam: Fame: 47 ft 8 in (12.7 m); Rest of first batch: 47 ft 6 in (12.6 m); Second batch: 47 ft 9½ in (12.8 m)
- Propulsion: Sails
- Armament: 74 guns: Gundeck: 28 × 32-pounders; Upper gundeck: 28 × 18-pounders; Quarterdeck: 14 × 9-pounders; Forecastle: 4 × 9-pounders

The Fame-class ships of the line were a class of four 74-gun third rates, designed for the Royal Navy by Sir John Henslow. After the name-ship of the class was ordered in October 1799, the design was slightly altered before the next three ships were ordered in February 1800. A second batch of five ships was ordered in 1805 to a slightly further modified version of the original draught.

== Ships ==
=== First batch ===
- HMS Fame

Builder: Deptford Dockyard
Ordered: 15 October 1799
Laid down: 22 January 1802
Launched: 8 October 1805
Fate: Broken up, 1817

- HMS Albion

Builder: Perry, Blackwall Yard
Ordered: 4 February 1800
Laid down: June 1800
Launched: 17 June 1802
Fate: Broken up, 1836

- HMS Hero

Builder: Perry, Blackwall Yard
Ordered: 4 February 1800
Laid down: August 1800
Launched: 18 August 1803
Fate: Wrecked, 1811

- HMS Illustrious

Builder: Randall & Brent, Rotherhithe
Ordered: 4 February 1800
Laiddown: February 1801
Launched: 3 September 1803
Fate: Broken up, 1868

=== Second batch ===
- HMS Marlborough

Builder: Mrs Barnard, Deptford Wharf
Ordered: 31 January 1805
Laid down: August 1805
Launched: 22 June 1807
Fate: Broken up, 1835

- HMS York

Builder: Brent, Rotherhithe
Ordered: 31 January 1805
Laid down: August 1805
Launched: 7 July 1807
Fate: Broken up, 1854

- HMS Sultan

Builder: Dudman, Deptford Wharf
Ordered: 31 January 1805
Laid down: December 1805
Launched: 19 September 1807
Fate: Broken up, 1864

- HMS Hannibal

Builder: Adams, Bucklers Hard
Ordered: 31 January 1805
Laid down: December 1805
Launched: May 1810
Fate: Broken up, 1833

- HMS Royal Oak

Builder: Dudman, Deptford Wharf
Ordered: 31 January 1805
Laid down: June 1806
Launched: 4 March 1809
Fate: Broken up, 1850
