= John Pakenham =

Vice-Admiral John Pakenham
- Born: 1743
- Died: 1807 (aged 63–64); Lowestoft, Suffolk
- Military career
- Allegiance: Kingdom of Great Britain
- Branch: Royal Navy
- Rank: Vice-Admiral
- Commands: Jamaica Station; HMS Gibraltar; HMS Ajax
- Conflicts: French Revolutionary Wars; Napoleonic Wars

Vice-Admiral John Pakenham (1743–1807) was a Royal Navy officer who became Commander-in-Chief of the Jamaica Station.

== Naval career ==
Promoted to post captain in 1780, Pakenham briefly served as Commander-in-Chief of the Jamaica Station in 1785 before going on to command the third-rate HMS Gibraltar in 1796 and the third-rate HMS Ajax in July 1798 in the Channel. Promoted to rear-admiral in 1799 and to vice-admiral in 1804, he died at Lowestoft in Suffolk in 1807.

== Sources ==
- Cundall, Frank (1915). Historic Jamaica. West India Committee.
- Nelson, Horatio (2011). The Dispatches and Letters of Vice Admiral Lord Viscount Nelson. Cambridge University Press. ISBN 978-1108035422.

Military offices
Preceded by James Gambier	Commander-in-Chief, Jamaica Station; 1785	Succeeded by Alan Gardner
