= Elizabeth (1798 ship) =

German and British merchant ship

History

Hamburg
- Name: Elizabeth
- Owner: B. Bosen & Co.
- Launched: 1798
- Fate: Sold 1813

United Kingdom
- Name: Elizabeth
- Owner: G.Hooper & Co.
- Acquired: 1813 by purchase
- Fate: Seized by convicts and wrecked in November 1817

General characteristics
- Tons burthen: 251, or 252 (bm)
- Armament: 1813:6 × 18-pounder carronades; 1815:2 × 6-pounder guns + 8 × 9-pounder carronades

Elizabeth was launched at Hamburg in 1798. British owners purchased her in 1813 as a West Indiaman. She traded with the Mediterranean and elsewhere. She was at the Cape of Good Hope in November 1817 when a group of convicts and army deserters took possession of her. They ran her onshore a few days later, wrecking her.

== Career ==
Elizabeth first appeared in the supplementary pages of the 1812 volume of Lloyd's Register (LR). It showed her master as Langrick, her owner as H.Hooper, and her trade as London–Berbice. It also showed her origin as Denmark. The 1813 volume amended her origin to Hamburg and her trade to Falmouth. It also reported that she had been almost rebuilt in 1801.

Year	Master	Owner	Trade	Source & notes
1815	Langrish; B.White	G.Hooper	London–Gibraltar; London–Gibraltar	Register of Shipping
1816	B.White	G.Hooper	London–Malta	LR; almost rebuilt 1801, & good repair 1813

== Fate ==
On 28 May 1817 Elizabeth, White, master, was at Deal, preparing to sail to the Cape of Good Hope. On 11 November she was anchored off Robin Island with 120 tons of oil on board. A group of armed deserters from the 60th Regiment of Foot and convicts, 12 in number, took over Elizabeth. They put the master and crew ashore in her boat, keeping only the mate aboard, and sailed her off. Isabella, Long, master, sailed from the Cape on the 12th in pursuit, followed on the 13th by HMS Musquito. The government schooner Isabella arrived back at the Cape on the 12th not having found Elizabeth. The men who had taken Elizabeth had deliberately run her ashore at the mouth of the Elephant River, where she went to pieces. The mate drowned.
