= Tom (1798 ship) =

History

Great Britain
- Name: Tom
- Launched: 1798, Whitby (Note: The most complete book about Whitby and its shipbuilding has no vessel named Tom, and no vessel of approximately her burthen being launched between 1797 and 1799.)
- Captured: April 1805

General characteristics
- Tons burthen: 276, or 278 (bm)
- Complement: 25
- Armament: 1800: 8 × 9-pounder + 2 × 12-pounder carronades; 1803: 6 × 6&12-pounder guns + one swivel gun

Tom was launched at Whitby in 1798 as a West Indiaman. New owners in 1802 resulted in Tom becoming a whaler in the southern whale fishery. The Spanish seized her in 1805 off Peru.

== Career ==
Tom first appeared in Lloyd's Register (LR) in 1799.

Year	Master	Owner	Trade	Source
1802	Woodhouse; J.Moody	Moore & Co. Biddolph & Co.	Lancaster–Jamaica; London–South Seas	LR

Tom, Woodhourse, master, arrived at Gravesend on 28 July 1802. Tom, Moody, master, was next reported to have been at the Island of May on 25 November while on her way from London to the South Seas. In December Tom stopped in at Rio de Janeiro, needing repairs. After not finding any whales off Brazil, Tom sailed via Cape Horn to Concepcion to repair damage. Captain Moody sailed with his wife.

War with France resumed in early 1803. Captain John Mudie acquired a letter of marque on 5 July 1803. Near the Galapagos Islands Tom was able to take some sperm whale oil. She then sailed to California, taking more whales between Cabo San Lucas and the Three Marias.

In October 1803, the Court of Directors of the British East India Company gave Mudie and three other whalers permission to sail east of the Cape of Good Hope to the Southern Fishery.

In March–April 1804 Tom was reported to be well in the Pacific. At Cedros Island Tom gathered elephant seal oil and some seal skins. In April 1805, Tom was at Talacahuanna, on her way back to Britain.

== Fate ==
In November 1805, Lloyd's List reported that "Tom, of London" was one of four British whalers detained in port on the Peruvian coast. Two weeks later Lloyd's List reported that Tom, Moody (or Mudie), master, had been taken in April at Concepcion. She had had 1500 barrels of whale oil on board.

A later report put the loss at 450 barrels of sperm oil and 1050 barrels of elephant [seal] oil, a number of seal skins, 12 prime otter skins, and one barrel of large whales' teeth of good ivory weighing from two to three hundredweight.

Fort Galvis had fired on Tom, almost sinking her. Her crew was detained at Concepcion.
