= Lord Duncan (1798 EIC ship) =

British merchantman trading with India (1798–1813)

History

Great Britain
- Name: Lord Duncan
- Namesake: Adam Duncan, 1st Viscount Duncan
- Owner: EIC voyages 1–6: John Woolmore; EIC voyage 7: John Cumberlege
- Operator: British East India Company
- Builder: Perry, Blackwall
- Launched: 17 January 1798
- Fate: Sold 1813 for breaking up

General characteristics
- Tons burthen: 830, or 83056/94, or 870 (bm)
- Length: Overall:146 ft 1 in (44.5 m); Keel:118 ft 6 3/4 in (36.1 m)
- Beam: 36 ft 3 1/2 in (11.1 m)
- Depth of hold: 14 ft 8 1/2 in (4.5 m)
- Complement: 1798:80; 1803:85; 1805:100; 1812:80
- Armament: 1798: 26 × 12&6–pounder guns; 1803:18 × 9–pounder guns; 1805:26 − 12&6–pounder guns; 1812:26 - 12&6–pounder guns
- Notes: Three decks

Lord Duncan was launched on the River Thames in 1798 as an East Indiaman. She made seven voyages for the British East India Company (EIC) before she was sold in 1813 for breaking up.

== Career ==
After Lord Duncan was launched HMS Kent was launched immediately thereafter. Kent followed nearly the same course as Lord Duncan had taken with the result that Kent's stern ran into Lord Duncan's bow, doing great damage to both vessels. Both vessels then had to go back into dock to effect repairs.

1st EIC voyage (1798–1800): Captain George Saltwell acquired a letter of marque on 3 April 1798. He sailed from Portsmouth on 29 April 1798, bound for Bengal and British Bencoolen. Lord Duncan was at Rio de Janeiro at 6 July and reached Bencoolen on 24 September. She arrived at Diamond Harbour on 6 November. Homeward bound, she was at Saugor on 2 January 1799. She reached Madras on 19 January and Kedgeree on 11 February. She returned to Bencoolen on 8 October, reached St Helena on 15 March, and arrived back at the Downs on 30 May.

When Lord Duncan and Dublin first approached England their pursers took to boats to land and carry their dispatches to India House in London. They encountered a French lugger privateer that they mistook for a revenue cutter. Lord Duncan's pursuer was able to escape with his dispatches.

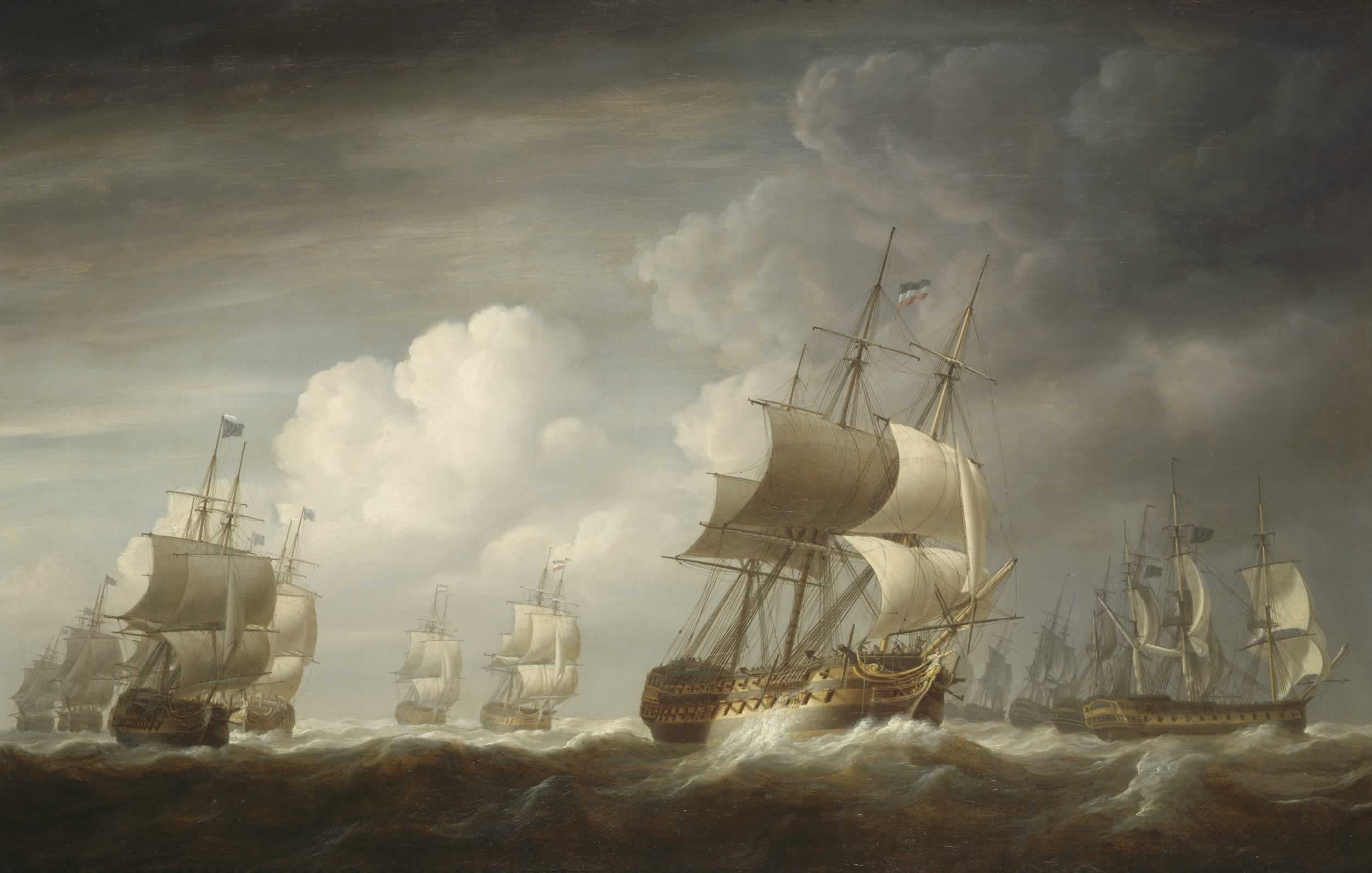
A fleet of East Indiamen at Sea, by Nicholas Pocock; it is believed to show the Indiamen Lord Hawkesbury, Worcester, Boddam, Fort William, Airly Castle, Lord Duncan, Ocean, Henry Addington, Carnatic, Hope and Windham returning from China in 1802

2nd EIC voyage (1801–1802): Captain Saltwell sailed from Portsmouth on 31 May 1801, bound for St Helena and China. Lord Duncan reached St Helena on 11 June. (Lord Duncan, Windham, and two transports brought supplies to St Helena.) Lord Duncan arrived at Whampoa Anchorage on 7 October. Homeward bound, she crossed the Second Bar on 19 December, reached St Helena on 12 April 1802, and arrived back at the Downs on 10 June.

3rd EIC voyage (1803–1805): Captain Anthony Murray acquired a letter of marque on 25 July 1803. Lord Duncan sailed from the Downs on 13 October, bound for the Cape of Good Hope (the Cape), and Bengal. She reached the Cape on 22 December and Madras on 16 April 1804. She arrived at Diamond Harbour on 13 May. Homeward bound, she was at Saugor on 30 July, reached St Helena on 14 February 1805, and arrived at the Downs on 29 April.

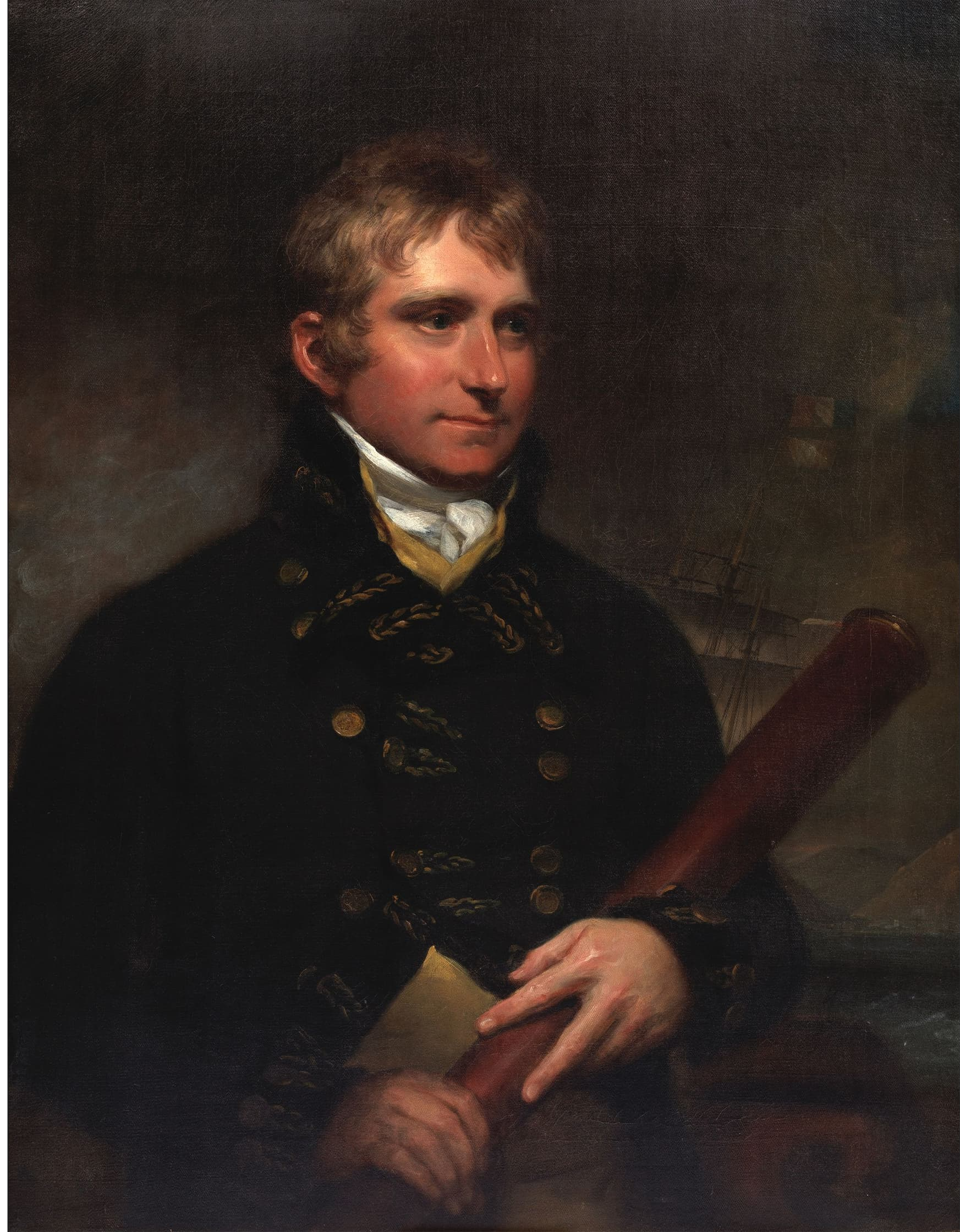
Portrait of Captain Edward Chapman Bradford, by William Beechey

4th EIC voyage (1805–1806): Captain Edward Chapman Bradford acquired a letter of marque on 21 January 1805. He sailed from Portsmouth on 8 March, bound for Madras and Bengal. Lord Duncan reached Madras on 13 July and arrived at Diamond Harbour on 14 August. Homeward bound, she was at Saugor on 20 December, reached St Helena on 14 May 1806, and arrived at the Downs on 18 July.

5th EIC voyage (1807–1808): Captain Bradford sailed from Portsmouth on 4 March 1807, bound for Madras and Bengal. Lord Duncan reached Madras on 4 July and arrived at Diamond Harbour on 30 July. She was at Saugor on 27 September but returned to Diamond Harbour on 24 October. Homeward bound, she was at Culpee on 27 December, reached St Helena on 11 June 1808, and arrived back at the Downs on 14 August.

6th EIC voyage (1809–1810): Captain Bradford sailed from Portsmouth on 24 February 1809, bound for Madras and Bengal. Lord Duncan was at Madeira on 8 March, reached Madras on 5 July, and arrived at Diamond Harbour on 19 July. Homeward bound, she was at Saugor on 17 October, and Madras again on 4 February 1810. she reached St Helena on 3 May and arrived back at the Downs on 6 July.

7th EIC voyage (1812–1813): Captain Thomas Price acquired a letter of marque on 4 April 1812. He sailed from Falmouth on 15 May 1812, bound for Bombay. On 3 June Lord Duncan was at Madeira . She reached Goa on 13 October and arrived at Bombay on 20 October. Homeward bound, she was at Point de Galle on 4 February 1813, and St Helena on 13 June; she arrived at the Downs on 10 August.

== Fate ==
Lord Duncan was sold in 1813 for breaking up.
