= Seventy-four (ship) =

Type of ship of the line

- Scale model of Achille, a typical French seventy-four of the Téméraire class at the beginning of the 19th century.

Class overview
- Name: 74-gun
- Builders: Numerous
- Operators: French Navy; Royal Navy; Spanish Navy; Royal Netherlands Navy; Portuguese Navy; Two Sicilies Navy; Royal Danish Navy; Swedish Navy; Imperial Russian Navy; Venetian Navy; Numerous others
- In commission: 1740s–1810s

General characteristics
- Type: ship of the line
- Tons burthen: 2,000–3,000 bm
- Length: 161–182 ft (49–55 m)
- Beam: 46 ft (14 m)
- Draught: 23 ft (7 m)
- Sail plan: ship rig
- Complement: 500–700 men
- Armament: 28 × 24-36-pounders; 28–30 × 18-24-pounders; 14–18 × 6-12-pounders

The "seventy-four" was a type of two-decked sailing ship of the line, which nominally carried 74 guns. It was developed by the French navy in the 1740s, replacing earlier classes of 60- and 62-gun ships, as a larger complement to the recently developed 64-gun ships. Impressed with the performance of several captured French seventy-fours, the British Royal Navy quickly adopted similar designs, classing them as third rates. The type then spread to the Spanish, Dutch, Danish and Russian navies.

The design was considered a good balance between firepower and sailing qualities. Hundreds of seventy-fours were constructed, becoming the dominant form of ship-of-the-line. They remained the mainstay of most major fleets into the early 19th century. From the 1820s, they began to be replaced by larger two-decked ships mounting more guns. However, some seventy-fours remained in service until the late 19th century, when they were finally supplanted by ironclads.

Standardising on a common ship size was an appealing ideal for naval administrators and bureaucrats. Although the seventy-four was a common type, the ship classes were not identical, even within the same navy. In the period 1750–1790, seventy-fours could measure from just under 2,000 to 3,000 tons burthen. The armament could also vary considerably, with the lower deck mounting 24-pounder to 36-pounder long guns, and a variety of calibres (sometimes including a few carronades) used on the upper deck. Some seventy-fours of the Danish navy only carried 70 guns.

== First 74-gun designs ==
The first 74-gun ships were constructed by the French as they rebuilt their navy during the early years of the reign of Louis XV. The new ship type was a very large two-decker big enough to carry the largest common type of gun (36-pounders) on the lower gun deck, something only three-deckers had done earlier. This great firepower was combined with very good sailing qualities compared to both the taller three-deckers and the shorter old-style 70-gun two-deckers, making the 74 the perfect combination of the two. A disadvantage of the 74 was that it was relatively expensive to build and man compared to the older type of two-decker.

The 74-gun ship carried 28 (24–36-pounder) long guns on the lower gun deck, 28–30 (18–24-pounders) on the upper gun deck, and 14–18 (6–12-pounders) on the upper works. Crew size was around 500 to 750 men depending on design, circumstances and nationality, with British ships tending to have smaller crews than other navies. The French had large and small seventy-fours, called grand modèle and petit modèle; the waterline length of a grand modèle seventy-four could be up to 182 feet. This was copied by the Royal Navy in about two dozen such ships of its own, such as HMS Colossus where they were known as Large, while the other seventy-fours built to be between 166–171 feet (51–52 m) were known as Common.

The significance of the 74s is hard to overstate, as shown by a summary of the ships of the line for all nations that were in commission at any time during the Revolutionary/Napoleonic Wars period:

- 1st and 2nd rates (90-130 guns) 156
- 3rd rate 74s (70–90 guns) 408
- 4th rate (60–68 guns) 199

=== The 80-gun ship ===
Lengthening the hull by one gun port, allowing one additional gun per side on the lower and upper gun decks and on the quarterdeck produced the 80-gun ship. Given the construction techniques of the day, the seventy-four approached the limits of what was possible. Such long hulls made from wood had a tendency to flex and sag over time. Increased maintenance could counter this to some extent, but was of course costly. This limited the success of the even bigger two-deck 80-gun ships that were built in small numbers after the seventy-four had been introduced. Three-deckers did not have the same problem as the additional deck gave more rigidity.

== 74s in the Royal Navy ==
The Royal Navy captured a number of the early French 74-gun ships during the War of the Austrian Succession (for example, Invincible, captured at the first battle of Cape Finisterre in 1747) and the Seven Years' War and was greatly impressed by them compared to its own smallish 70-gun ships. As a result, it started building them in great numbers from about 1760, as did most other navies. Navies that were restricted by shallow waters, such as the Dutch and Scandinavian navies, at least early on tended to avoid the 74-gun ship to a certain degree due to its size and draught, preferring smaller two-deckers instead. Even so, the seventy-four was a standard feature in all European navies around 1800. Only a handful of 74-gun ships were commissioned into the United States Navy; the US Navy's early sea power concentrated on its frigates.

The type fell into disuse after the Napoleonic Wars, when improved building techniques made it possible to build even bigger two-deckers of 84 or even 90 guns without sacrificing hull rigidity.

The last seventy-four, the French Trafalgar veteran Duguay-Trouin, was scuttled in 1949. Her stern ornamentation is on display at the National Maritime Museum, Greenwich. In addition, dozens of ship models exist, produced as part of constructing the real ships, and thus believed accurate both externally and internally.

== Classes ==
=== British ===
- Dublin-class ship of the line (7 ships)
- Hercules-class ship of the line (2)
- Valiant-class ship of the line (2)
- Bellona-class ship of the line (5)
- Arrogant-class ship of the line (12)
  - HMS Bellerophon
- Canada-class ship of the line (4)
- Ramillies-class ship of the line (9)
- Albion-class ship of the line (1763) (5)
- Elizabeth-class ship of the line (8)
- Royal Oak-class ship of the line (6)
- Culloden-class ship of the line (8)
- Alfred-class ship of the line (4)
- Ganges-class ship of the line (6)
- Courageux-class ship of the line (6)
- Mars-class ship of the line (2)
- Ajax-class ship of the line (2)
- Pompée-class ship of the line (2)
- America-class ship of the line (2)
- Fame-class ship of the line (4)
- Repulse-class ship of the line (8)
- Swiftsure-class ship of the line (2)
- Vengeur-class ship of the line (40)
- Black Prince-class ship of the line (4)

=== French ===
- Annibal-class ship of the line (2 ships)
- Téméraire-class ship of the line (107)
  - Redoutable
- César-class ship of the line (3)
- Séduisant-class ship of the line (2)

=== Russian ===
- Tsar Constatine-class ship of the line (4 ships)
- Yaroslav-class ship of the line (19)
- Svyatoy Petr-class ship of the line (7)
- Selafail-class ship of the line (23)
- Anapa-class ship of the line (11)
- Three Saints-class ship of the line (7)
- Ezekiel-class ship of the line (25)

=== Venetian ===
- Leon Trionfante-class ship of the line (16 ships)
- San Lorenzo Zustinian-class ship of the line (29)
- Corona-class ship of the line (1)
- So-called "1780"-class ship of the line (4)

== Gallery ==
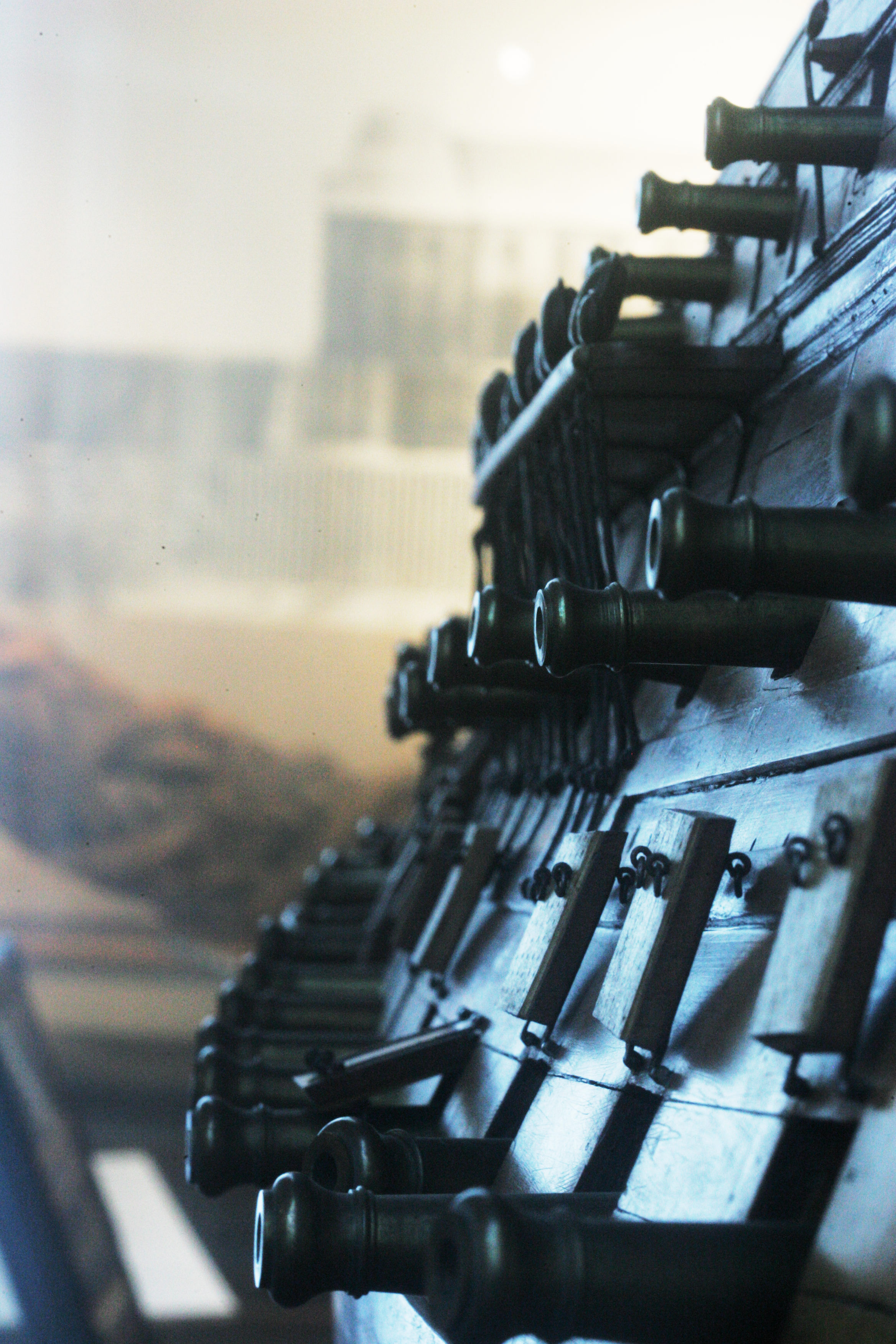
Broadside of a French 74-gun ship from 1755 (1/24th scale model)

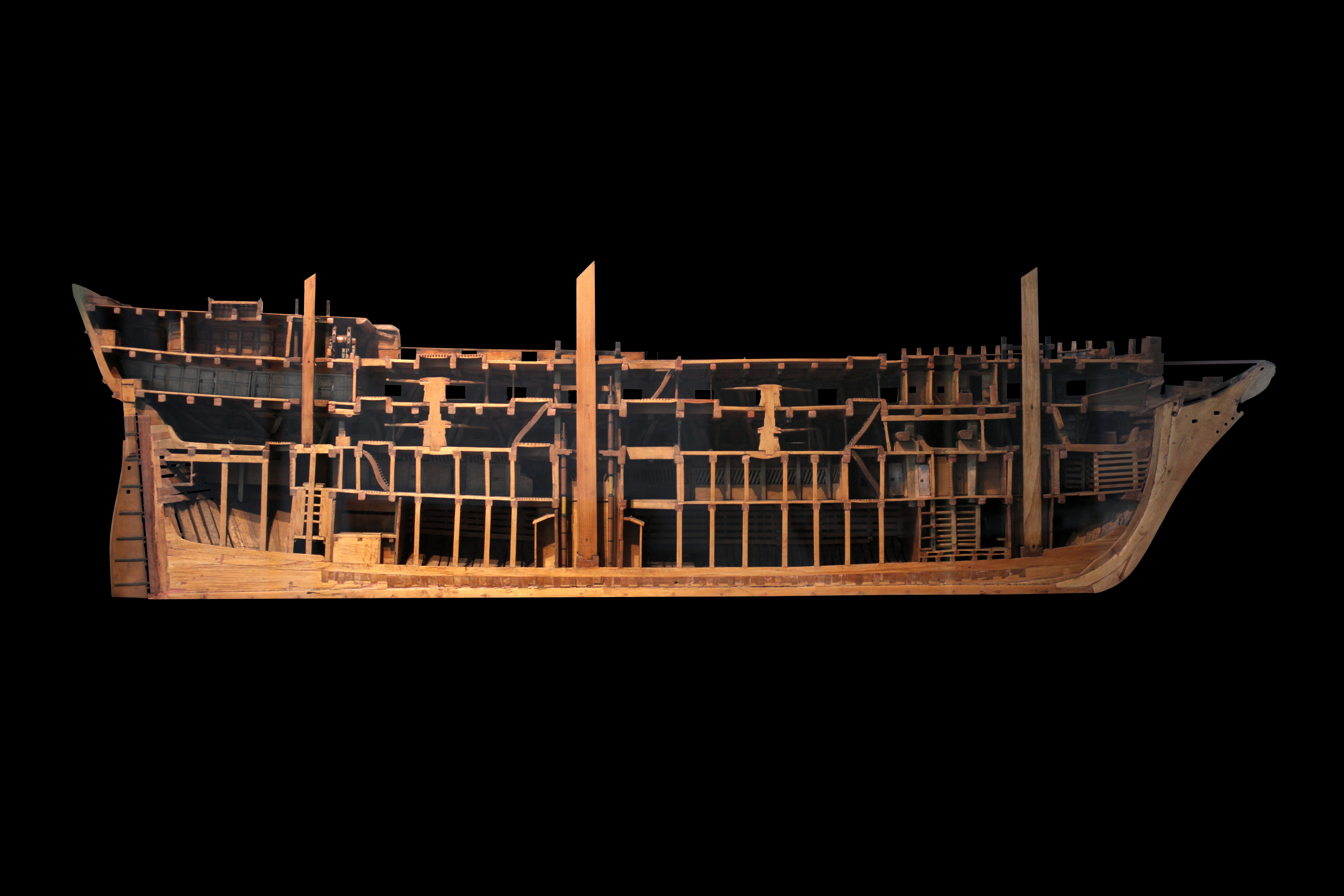
Inner arrangement of a Russian 74-gun ship. Elements of Sané's design are present, but with a British-style layout.

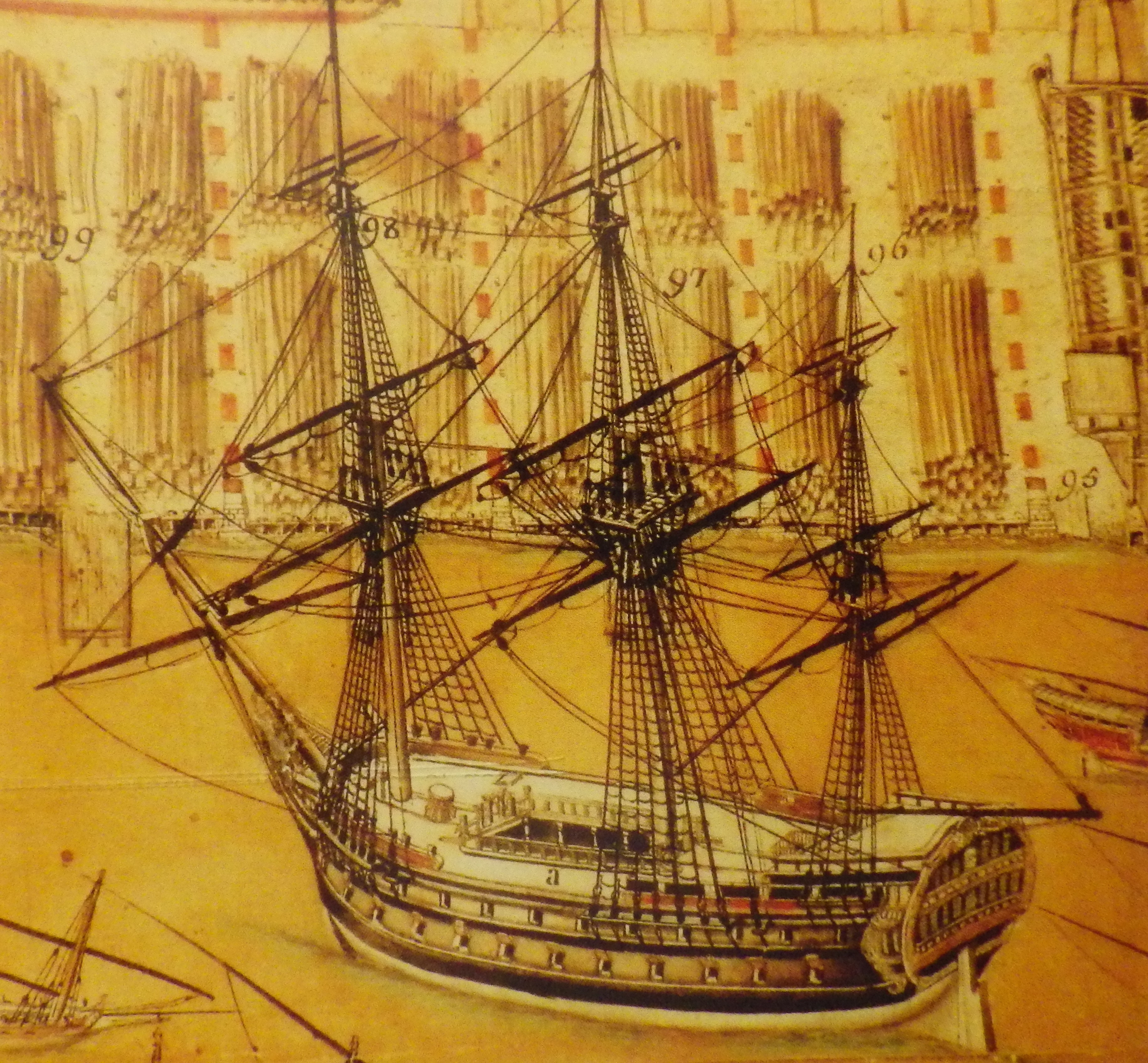
Venetian 74-gun ship Vittoria in the Arsenal of Venice. Detail from a print by Gianmaria Maffioletti, which depicts the Arsenal in May 1797, right before the French plunder. (Naval History Museum, Venice).

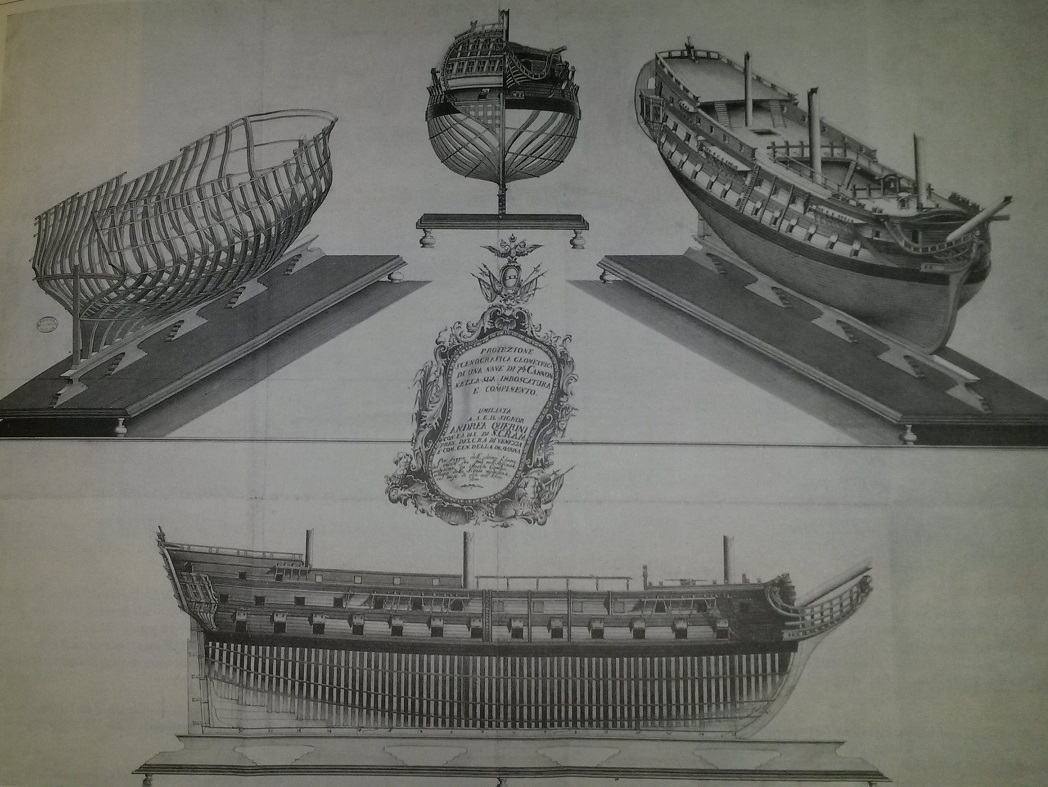
Geometric and scenographic projection of a Venetian 74-gun Leon Trionfante-class ship, late 18th century.
