= Walpole (1798 EIC ship) =

East India Company ship (1798–1808)

History

Great Britain
- Name: Walpole
- Owner: EIC voyage #1:Robert Wigram; EIC voyage #2:Robert Anderson; EIC voyage #3:Corbyn Morris Venner; EIC voyages #4-5:George Clark
- Builder: Wells, Perry's, & Green, Blackwall
- Launched: 3 March 1798
- Fate: Wrecked 18 December 1808

General characteristics
- Tons burthen: 823, or 82312/94, or 868 (bm)
- Length: Overall:146 ft 4 in (44.6 m); Keel:118 ft 10 1/2 in (36.2 m)
- Beam: 36 ft 1 in (11.0 m)
- Depth of hold: 14 ft 9 in (4.5 m)
- Complement: 1798:99; 1801:88; 1804:105; 1805:105
- Armament: 1798:26 × 12&18-pounder guns; 1801:20 × 12-pounder guns + 6 × 18-pounder guns; 1803:26 × 6&12-pounder guns; 1805:26 × 12&6-pounder guns

Walpole was launched in 1798 as an East Indiaman. She made four complete voyages for the British East India Company (EIC). She was wrecked in 1808 as she was returning to London from her fifth voyage.

== Career ==
On 5 April 1797 the EIC agreed with Michael Humble, Esq., that it would engage Walpole, to be built on the Thames, for six voyages to all parts of China and India at a rate of £20 10s per ton for 820 tons.

=== 1st EIC voyage (1798–1800) ===
Captain Corbyn Morris Venner acquired a letter of marque on 11 April 1798. He sailed from Portsmouth on 29 April, bound for China and Madras. Walpole reached Rio de Janeiro on 5 July, and arrived at Whampoa Anchorage on 4 December. Homeward bound, she crossed the second Bar on 8 January 1799 and reached Madras on 23 February. She visited Calingapatam on 14 March before returning to Madras on 19 April. She left Madras on 11 August, reached St Helena on 26 October and Cork on 17 January 1800, before arriving in the Downs on 31 January.

=== 2nd EIC voyage (1801–1802) ===
Captain James Sandilands acquired a letter of marque on 14 February 1801. (Note: James Sandilands later became the 10th Lord Torpichen.) He sailed from Portsmouth on 31 March 1801, bound for Madras, Bengal, and Benkulen. Walpole reached Madras on 26 July and arrived at Diamond Harbour on 20 August. She was at Saugor on 30 November, and sailed from there on 23 January 1802. She reached British Bencoolen on 24 February. She left there on 6 April, reached St Helena on 25 June, and arrived at the Downs on 30 August.

=== 3rd EIC voyage (1803–1804) ===
Captain Sandilands sailed from the Downs on 2 March 1803, bound for Madras. Walpole reached Johanna on 21 May and arrived at Madras on 15 June. Homeward bound, she left Madras on 12 September, reached St Helena on 27 November, and arrived back at the Downs on 24 March 1804. Captain Sandilands acquired a letter of marque on 10 February 1804.

=== 4th EIC voyage (1805–1806) ===
Captain Sandilands acquired a letter of marque on 29 January 1805. He sailed from Portsmouth on 8 March, bound for Madras and Bengal. Walpole reached Madras on 13 July and arrived at Diamond Harbour on 2 August. She was at Saugor on 31 December and left on 2 February 1806. She was at Point de Galle on 12 March, reached St Helena o 14 May, and arrived back at the Downs on 18 July.

=== 5th EIC voyage (1807–1808) ===
Captain Sandilands sailed from Portsmouth on 18 April 1807, bound for Madras and Bengal. Walpole reached Madras on 9 September and arrived at Diamond Harbour on 25 October. She was at Saugor between 22 November and 1 December. She visited Penang between 15 December and 12 January 1808, before returning to Bengal, arriving at Kedgeree on 8 February. Homeward bound she was at Saugor between 16 March and 26 May, reached St Helena on 10 September, and arrived back at the Downs on 13 December.

== Fate ==
On 15 December Walpole and several other vessels arrived in Dover Roads with the loss of cables and anchors, having been driven out of the Downs. A gale on 17 December drove her on shore.

Walpole stranded on 18 December 1808 near Margate while inward bound for the Thames. She was a total loss. Still, part of the cargo was saved. The EIC put the value of the cargo it lost on Walpole as £3,235.

All aboard were saved. Captain Sandilands's next command was Rose.
