= Tyne (1798 ship) =

Ship

History

Great Britain
- Name: Tyne
- Builder: Ann Brodrick, South Shields
- Launched: 1798
- Captured: c. 1801

General characteristics
- Tons burthen: 309 (bm)

Tyne was launched in Newcastle upon Tyne in 1798. She sailed between Dublin and the United States and apparently was captured c. 1801.

Tyne first appeared in Lloyd's Register (LR) in 1799. In 1801 LR carried the annotation "captured" by her name. It continued to carry the same entry for some years thereafter.

Year	Master	Owner	Trade	Source
1799	Simpson	Captain	London–Virginia	LR
1801	Simpson	Hawkesley	London–Virginia	LR

In 1799 Lloyd's List reported that the privateer Hussar had captured Nine Sisters, Simpson, master, and carried her into Surinam on 12 June 1799. She had been on a voyage from Dublin to Jamaica. Nine Sisters, of 208 tons (bm), launched in 1785, too had belonged to Hawksley.
