= USS Savannah (1798) =

18th-century US Naval galley

History

United States
- Name: USS Savannah
- Namesake: Savannah, a city in Georgia
- Ordered: 4 May 1798
- Builder: John Patterson, Savannah, Georgia
- Completed: 1799
- Commissioned: 20 March 1799
- Fate: Sold February 1802

General characteristics
- Type: row galley
- Length: 51 ft 9 in (15.77 m)
- Beam: 15 ft 0 in (4.57 m)
- Draft: 5 ft 8 in (1.73 m)
- Complement: 28
- Armament: 1 × long 24-pounder gun; 5 or 6 x howitzers

The first USS Savannah was a coastal galley that served in the U.S. Navy from 1799 to 1802.

Savannah was one of a number of small vessels authorized by an Act of Congress, approved 4 May 1798, to be used as Naval Militia training craft and for harbor defense. The Savannah class was designed by Joshua Humphreys and built at Savannah, Georgia, by John Patterson.

Savannah was placed in service on 20 March 1799, with "Captain of a Galley" John F. Randolph in command. The galleys were placed under the immediate command of Major General Charles C. Pinckney on 19 April 1799.

Savannah was sold out of service in February 1802.
