= Ajax-class ship of the line =

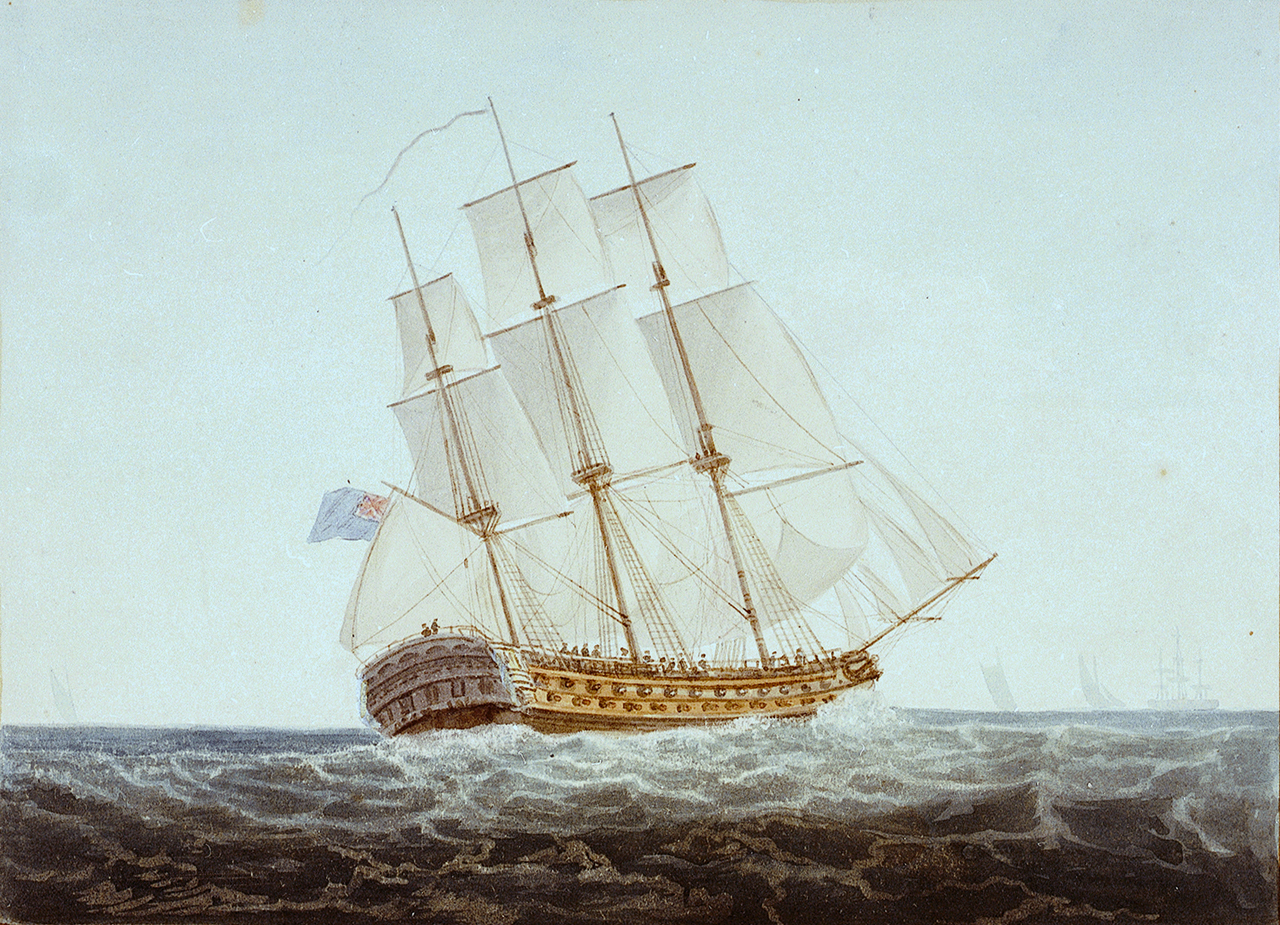
- HMS Ajax

Class overview
- Name: Ajax
- Operators: Royal Navy
- Preceded by: Mars class
- Succeeded by: Pompée class
- In service: 17 January 1798–1881
- Completed: 2

General characteristics
- Type: Ship of the line
- Length: 182 ft 3 in (55.5 m) (gundeck); 149 ft 8 in (45.6 m) (keel)
- Beam: 49 ft 3 in (15.0 m)
- Propulsion: Sails
- Armament: 74 guns: Gundeck: 28 × 32-pounders; Upper gundeck: 30 × 24-pounders; Quarterdeck: 12 × 9-pounders; Forecastle: 4 × 9-pounders
- Notes: Ships in class include: Kent, Ajax

The Ajax-class ships of the line were a class of two 74-gun third rates of the Royal Navy. They were grouped in with the large class of 74s, as they carried 24-pounders on their upper gun decks, rather than the 18-pounders of the middling and common class 74s. The design of the Ajax class was a lengthened (by 11 ft (3.4 m)) version of the Valiant class, the lines of which were taken from the French Invincible, captured in 1747.

== Ships ==
- HMS Kent

Builder: Perry, Blackwall Yard
Ordered: 10 June 1795
Launched: 17 January 1798
Fate: Broken up, 1881

- HMS Ajax

Builder: Randall, Rotherhithe
Ordered: 10 June 1795
Launched: 3 March 1798
Fate: Accidentally burnt, 1807
