= America-class ship of the line =

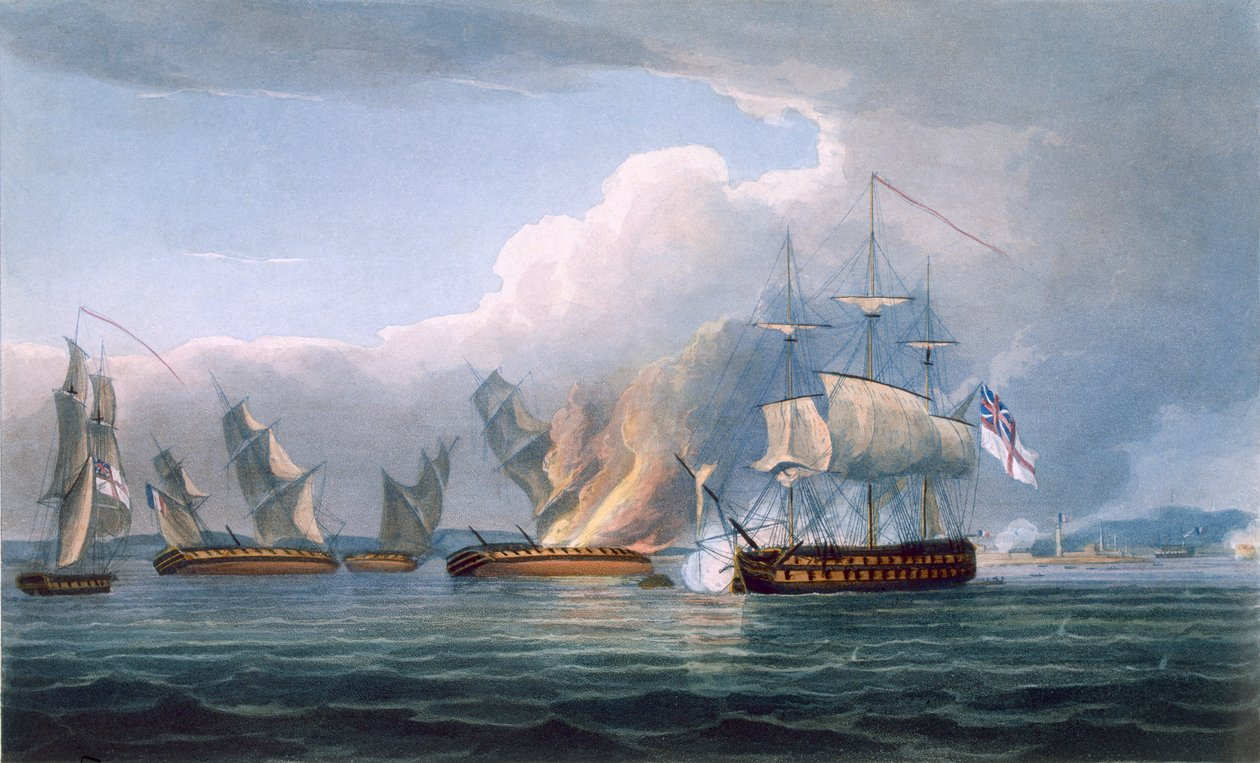
- HMS Northumberland at the action of 22 May 1812.

Class overview
- Name: America class
- Operators: Royal Navy
- Preceded by: Pompée class
- Succeeded by: Fame class
- In service: 2 February 1798 - 1850
- Completed: 2
- Retired: 2

General characteristics
- Type: Ship of the line
- Length: 182 ft (55 m) (gundeck); 150 ft (46 m) (keel)
- Beam: 48 ft 7 1/2 in (14.821 m)
- Propulsion: Sails
- Armament: 74 guns: Gundeck: 28 × 32-pounders; Upper gundeck: 30 × 18-pounders; Quarterdeck: 12 × 9-pounders; Forecastle: 4 × 9-pounders

The America-class ships of the line were a class of two 74-gun third rates. They were built for the Royal Navy to the lines of the French Téméraire-class ship America, which had been captured in 1794 and renamed HMS Impetueux.

== Ships ==
- HMS Northumberland

Builder: Barnard, Deptford Wharf
Ordered: 10 June 1795
Launched: 2 February 1798
Fate: Broken up, 1850

- HMS Renown

Builder: Dudman, Deptford Wharf
Ordered: 10 June 1795
Launched: 2 May 1798
Fate: Broken up, 1835
