= Earl St Vincent (1803 ship) =

French ship

History

France
- Name: Unknown
- Launched: 1794
- Captured: 1803

United Kingdom
- Name: Earl St. Vincent
- Namesake: John Jervis, 1st Earl of St Vincent
- Owner: Dunsterville
- Acquired: 1803 by purchase of a prize
- Fate: Last listed 1814

General characteristics
- Tons burthen: 106 (bm)
- Propulsion: Sail
- Complement: 20
- Armament: 6 × 9-pounder guns

Earl St Vincent was a French ship that was captured and became a British merchantman in 1803. Captain William Emery acquired a letter of marque on 10 June 1803. In 1804 her master was W. Emery, her owner Dunsterville, and her trade Cork to the West Indies.

A French privateer captured her in late 1803 as she was sailing from Cork to Barbados but the British Royal Navy recaptured her and took her into Dominica.

She then traded out of Cork. She was last listed in Lloyd's Register in 1814.
