= Lord Duncan (1798 Sunderland ship) =

History

Great Britain
- Name: Lord Duncan
- Namesake: Adam Duncan, 1st Viscount Duncan
- Launched: 1798, Sunderland
- Fate: Destroyed by an explosion in 1807

General characteristics
- Tons burthen: 925, or 935 (bm)
- Complement: 1800:50; 1806:70; 1806:70
- Armament: 1800: 20 × 18&9-pounder cannons; 1806:6 × 9-pounder guns + 20 × 18-pounder carronades + 6 swivel guns; 1806:6 × 9-pounder guns + 20 × 18-pounder carronades
- Notes: Three decks

Lord Duncan was launched at Sunderland in 1798. She initially traded with Smyrna, where in late 1801 she suffered a lightning strike. In 1806 she started trading with San Domingo and was blown up there in 1807 in an explosion.

== Career ==
Lord Duncan first appeared in Lloyd's Register (LR) in 1800. It gave he master as Thompson, her owner as Havelock, and her trade as London to Smyrna. Captain Joseph Thompson acquired a letter of marque on 18 March 1800.

On 16 November 1801, Lord Duncan, Thompson master, was at Smyrna when lightning struck her. She suffered considerable damage.

Year	Master	Owner	Trade	Source
1806	Thompson; Heurtley	Havelock	London–Smyrna; London–Santo Domingo	LR

Captain Thompson acquired a letter of marque on 8 October 1806, but then Captain Archibald Heurtley acquired one on 29 October.

Lloyd's List reported that on 7 December 1806 Lord Duncan, Hurtly, master, had put into Portsmouth leaky; she was making five feet of water in an hour. She was on her way from London to St Domingo.

== Fate ==
Lloyd's List reported in October 1807 that Lord Duncan, of and for London, Huersley, master, had been destroyed in an explosion at Saint Domingo with the loss of her Chief Mate and a seaman. She had 200 tons of coffee aboard.
