= John Randall (shipbuilder) =

John Randall (1755–1802) was an English shipbuilder.

== Life ==
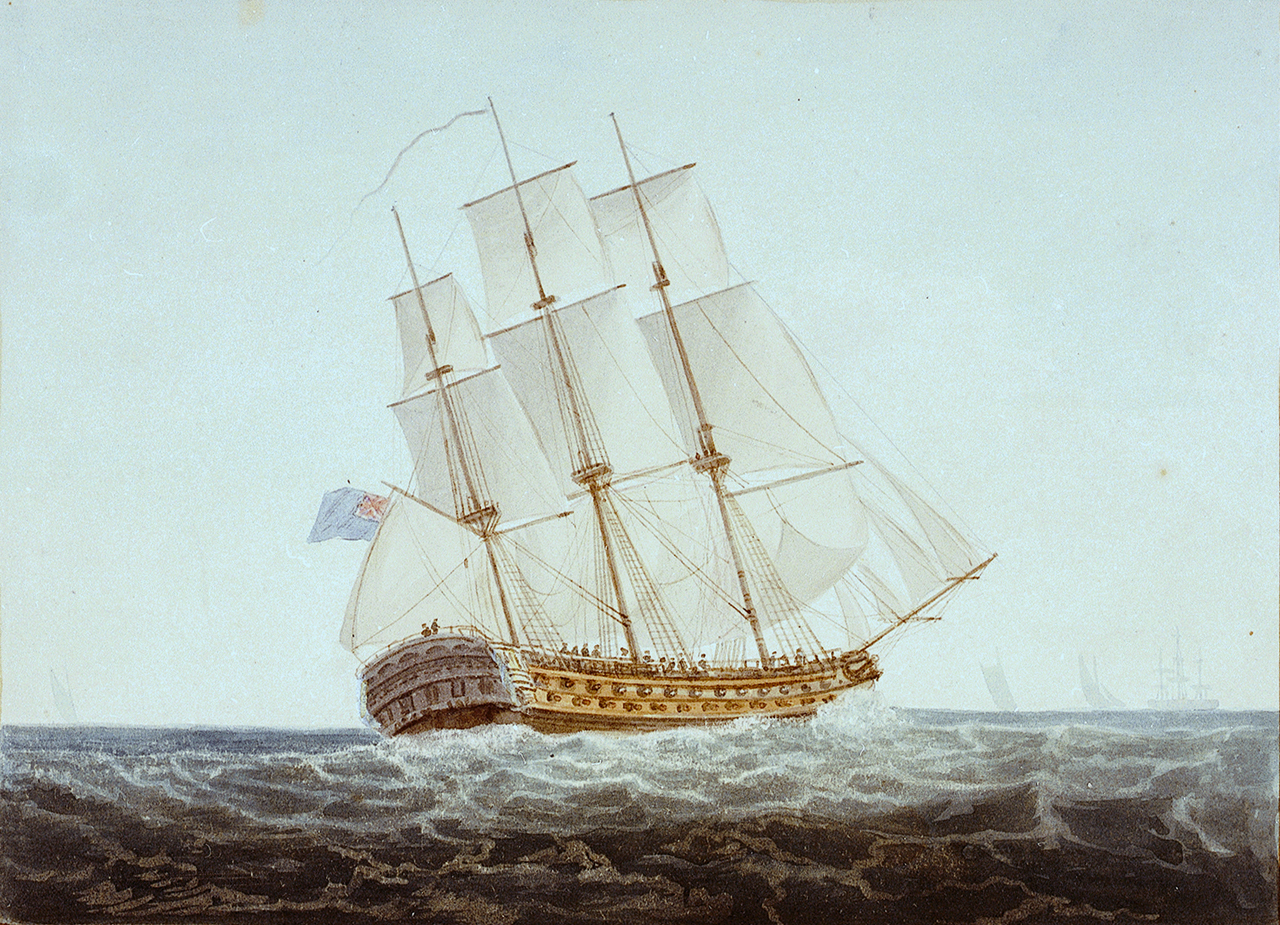
HMS Ajax of 1798, built by John Randall

The son of John Randall, shipbuilder of Rotherhithe, he had a liberal education, and on the death of his father, around 1776, continued the shipbuilding business under his own management. He also worked on mathematics, and naval construction.

In addition to many ships which he built for the mercantile marine and for the East India Company, Randall built over 50 naval vessels. They included 74-gun ships and large frigates, among them being HMS Audacious, HMS Ramillies, and HMS Culloden, noted in the French Revolutionary Wars. He took a prominent part in founding the Society of Naval Architects.

On the Peace of Amiens, Randall lowered his rates of pay from the wartime level, and his men went out on strike. The Admiralty permitted him to take on workmen from the Deptford dockyard, and offered a military force to protect them, which was turned down. The Deptford men were prevented from working in his yard; and some violence occurred. At this point Randall died, at his house in Great Cumberland Street, Hyde Park, on 23 August 1802. He left a widow and family.

== Notes ==
Attribution

This article incorporates text from a publication now in the public domain: Lee, Sidney, ed. (1896). "Randall, John (1755-1802)". Dictionary of National Biography. Vol. 47. London: Smith, Elder & Co.
