= Pompée-class ship of the line =

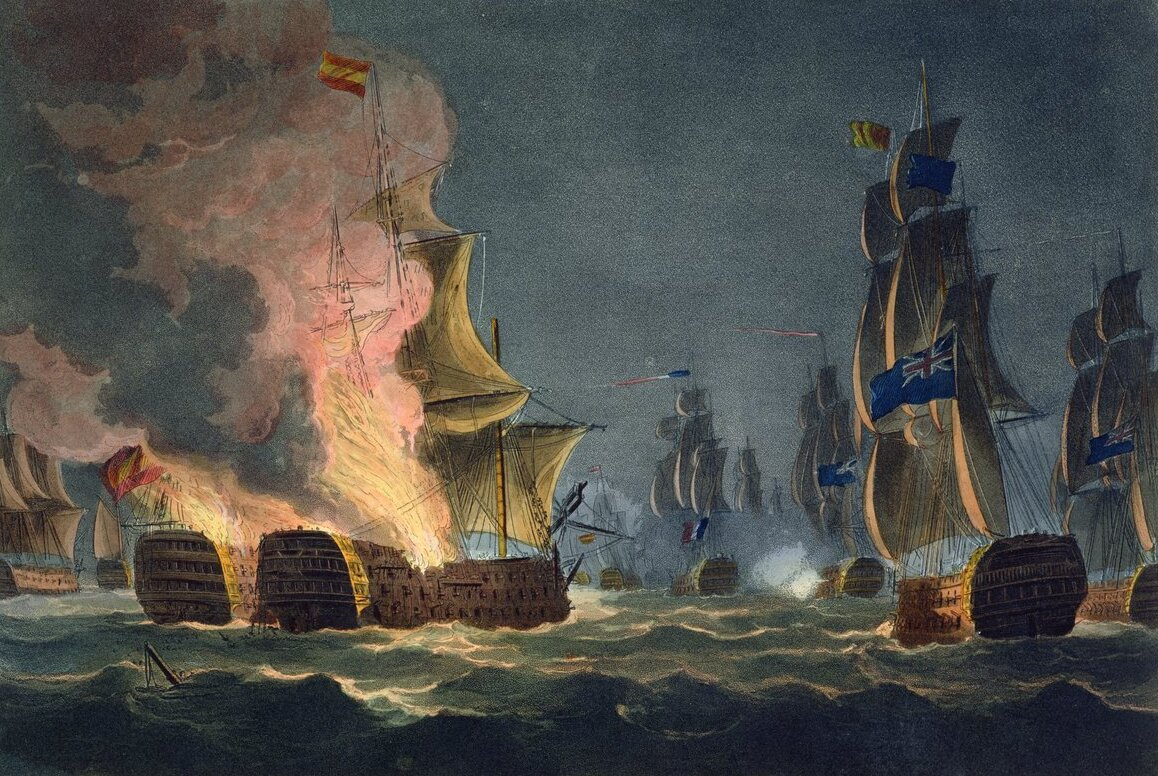
- HMS Superb

Class overview
- Name: Pompée
- Operators: Royal Navy
- Preceded by: Ajax class
- Succeeded by: America class
- In service: 19 March 1798 - 1865
- Completed: 2

General characteristics
- Type: Ship of the line
- Length: 182 ft 2 in (55.52 m) (gundeck); 149 ft 9 in (45.64 m) (keel)
- Beam: 49 ft (15 m)
- Propulsion: Sails
- Armament: 74 guns: Gundeck: 28 × 32 pdrs; Upper gundeck: 30 × 18 pdrs; Quarterdeck: 12 × 9 pdrs; Forecastle: 4 × 9 pdrs

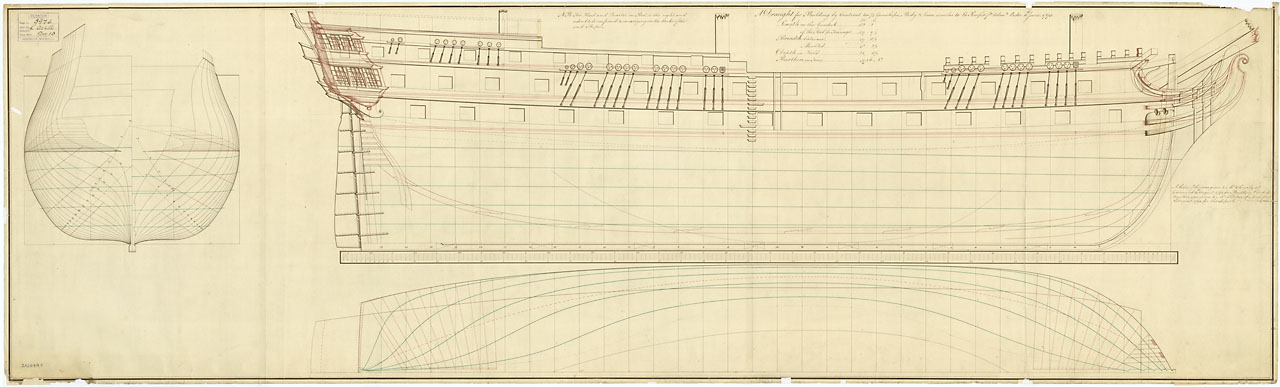
Plan of the Pompée-class ship of the line

The Pompée-class ships of the line were a class of two 74-gun third rates. They were built for the Royal Navy to the lines of the French ship Pompée, a Téméraire-class ship of the line which had been captured by Britain in 1793.

== Ships ==
- HMS Superb

Builder: Pitcher, Northfleet
Ordered: 10 June 1795
Launched: 19 March 1798
Fate: Broken up, 1826

- HMS Achilles

Builder: Cleverley, Gravesend
Ordered: 10 June 1795
Launched: 16 April 1798
Fate: Sold out of the service, 1865
