= Earl St Vincent (1798 Yarmouth ship) =

History

Great Britain
- Name: Earl St. Vincent
- Namesake: John Jervis, 1st Earl of St Vincent
- Owner: 1798: J. Sayers; 1806: Everard & Co.
- Builder: Yarmouth
- Launched: 1798
- Fate: Last listed in 1846

General characteristics
- Tons burthen: 150, or 151, (bm)
- Propulsion: Sail

Earl St Vincent was launched at Yarmouth in 1798. She entered Lloyd's Register in 1798 with W. Coville, master, and J. Sayers, owner. She then spent most of her early career trading with the Baltic. Earl St Vincent was reported to have been lost off Malta in 1802 while sailing from Zante to London. However, as the table below shows, this report appears to have been in error.

The two sources for the table (Lloyd's Register and the Register of Shipping agree in broad outline, but there are many discrepancies. The registers are only as accurate as the information owners cared to provide.) By 1815 the data in the two registers had converged. In 1820 she underwent a thorough repair, and in 1827 a small repair. Earl St Vincent was still listed in 1835 as a coaster operating out of Lynn, with J. Turner, master, and Everard and Co., owners. She also underwent another large repair in 1835. She again underwent a small repair in 1837.

Earl St Vincent was listed in 1845 sailing as a coaster out of Lynn, as she had been since c. 1807 when Everard & Co. had purchased her. She was last listed in 1846 with Bircham, master, and Everard, owner, but without a trade.

Year	Master	Owner	Trade	Source	Master	Owner	Trade	Source
1799	W. Covill	Sayers & Co.	Yarmouth—Baltic	Lloyd's Register				Register of Shipping; Not published yet
1800	W, Covill	Sayers & Co.	Lynn—Riga	Lloyd's Register	W. Covill	T. Sayers	London—Emden	Register of Shipping
1801	W. Covill	Sayers & Co.	Lynn—Riga	Lloyd's Register	W. Covill	T. Sayers	London—Emden	Register of Shipping
1802	W. Covill	Sayers & Co.	Lynn—Riga	Lloyd's Register	W. Walters	T. Sayers	London—Venice	Register of Shipping
1803	W. Covill	Sayers & Co.	Lynn—Riga	Lloyd's Register				Register of Shipping; Not available
1804	W. Covill	Sayers & Co.	Lynn—Riga	Lloyd's Register	W. Walters	T. Sayers	London—Venice	Register of Shipping
1805	W. Covill	Sayers & Co.	Lynn—Riga; Yarmouth—Baltic	Lloyd's Register	W. Walters	T. Sayers	London—Venice	Register of Shipping
1806	W. Covill; Robinson?	Sayers & Co.	Yarmouth—Baltic	Lloyd's Register	W. Walters	T. Sayers	Yarmouth—Baltic	Register of Shipping
1807	J. Stokley	Everard & Co.	Lynn-based coaster	Lloyd's Register				Register of Shipping; Not available
1808	J. Stokley; Roose?	Everard & Co.	Lynn-based coaster	Lloyd's Register				Register of Shipping; Not available
1809	Ormeston	Everard & Co.	Lynn-based coaster	Lloyd's Register	Ormeston	T. Sayers	Yarmouth-based coaster	Register of Shipping
1810	Ormeston	Everard & Co.	Lynn-based coaster	Lloyd's Register	Ormeston	T. Sayers	Lynn-based coaster	
1815	Ormeston	Everard & Co.	Lynn-based coaster	Lloyd's Register	Ormeston	Everard & Co.	Lynn-based coaster	Register of Shipping
1820	Ormeston	Everard & Co.	Lynn-based coaster	Lloyd's Register	Ormeston	Everard & Co.	Lynn-based coaster	Register of Shipping
1825	Ormeston	Everard & Co.	Lynn-based coaster	Lloyd's Register	Ormeston	Everard & Co.	Lynn-based coaster	Register of Shipping
1830	Ormeston	Everard & Co.	Lynn-based coaster	Lloyd's Register	Ormeston	Everard & Co.	Lynn-based coaster	Register of Shipping
1835	J. Turner	Everard & Co.	Lynn-based coaster	Lloyd's Register				Register of Shipping; Ceased publication
1840	G. Hamond; J. Bircham	Everard & Co.	Lynn-based coaster	Lloyd's Register				
1845	J. Bircham	Everard & Co.	Lynn-based coaster	Lloyd's Register				
