= Earl St Vincent (1798 Gatcombe ship) =

History

Great Kingdom
- Name: Earl St. Vincent
- Namesake: John Jervis, 1st Earl of St Vincent
- Owner: 1798: Wade & Co.; 1803:R.H. Major
- Builder: Gatcombe, Gloucestershire, on the River Severn (Note: This is an unusual location for shipbuilding. As a result, the Register of Shipping originally referred to it as "Gtnbg", correcting it to "Gtcmb", and Lloyd's Register started with "Gtcmb", later changed to "Severn".)
- Launched: 1798
- Fate: Captured 1806

General characteristics
- Tons burthen: 200, or 270, or 281, or 341 (bm)
- Propulsion: Sail
- Armament: 1799:10 × 9-pounder + 2 × 6-pounder guns + 4 × 18-pounder carronades; 1802:12 × 9-pounder guns + 4 × 18-pounder carronades

Earl St Vincent (or Earl of St Vincent) was launched in 1798 at Gatcombe, on the Severn. She initially traded between Bristol and Jamaica. She then made one voyage as an "extra ship", i.e., under voyage charter, for the British East India Company (EIC). On her return she again traded with the West Indies until she was captured in 1806.

== Career ==
Earl St Vincent entered Lloyd's Register in 1798 with P. Wade, master and owner, and trade Bristol—Jamaica. She was designed as a fast sailing packet vessel.

Peter Wade acquired a letter of marque. In September 1799 Wade advertised her as sailing from Bristol to Jamaica with himself as master, but then in December advertised her for sale. In January 1800 he advertised her as sailing to Madeira and Jamaica with Robert Williams, master. She then apparently sailed to the West Indies and back to London.

In 1800 the EIC chartered Earl St Vincent for a voyage to India and back. Messrs Princip & Saunders had tendered her to the EIC to bring back rice from Bengal. She was one of 28 vessels that sailed on that mission between December 1800 and February 1801.

Captain Richard Williams sailed from Spithead on 30 December 1800, bound for Bengal. He arrived at Calcutta on 24 May 1801. Homeward bound, she was at Saugor on 8 August, and arrived at the Downs on 26 January 1802.

In 1802 she again sailed to the West Indies and back. In January 1803 Richard Acraman advertised her for sale. Her new owner, R.H. Major, then changed her registry to London as she leaves the Bristol records. Major then sailed between London and the West Indies. He may have sold Earl St Vincent to Hopper and Co., before E. Major & Co. purchased her.

The two sources for the table below (Lloyd's Register and the Register of Shipping) agree in broad outline, but there are discrepancies. The registers published at different times, and are only as accurate as the information owners cared to provide.

Year	Master	Owner	Trade	Source	Master	Owner	Trade	Source
1799	Williams	P. Wade	Bristol—Jamaica	Lloyd's Register				Register of Shipping; Not published yet
1800	Williams	Wade & Co.	Bristol—Jamaica	Lloyd's Register	Williams	Wade & Co.	Bristol—Jamaica	Register of Shipping
1801	P. Wade; R. Williams	Wade & Co.	Bristol—Jamaica; London—India	Lloyd's Register	Williams	Wade & Co.	Bristol—Jamaica	Register of Shipping
1802	R. Williams	Wade & Co.	London—India; London—Honduras	Lloyd's Register	Williams; J. Gardner	Wade & Co.	London—India; London—Honduras	Register of Shipping
1803	Williams; R.H. Major	Wade & Co. Capt. & Co.	Honduras—Cork; London—Honduras	Lloyd's Register				Register of Shipping; Not available
1804	B.B. Major	Hopper & Co.	Cork—London; London—St Vincent	Lloyd's Register	E. Major	Capt. & Co.	London—Yucatán; London—St Vincent	Register of Shipping
1805	B.B. Major; Robley	Hopper & Co.	London—St Vincent	Lloyd's Register	E. Major	Capt. & Co.	London—St Vincent	Register of Shipping
1806	J. Robley	Major & Co.	London—St Vincent	Lloyd's Register	E. Major	Capt. & Co.	London—Jamaica	Register of Shipping
1807	J. Robley	Major & Co.	London—St Vincent	Lloyd's Register				Register of Shipping; Not available

== Fate ==
The Morning Chronicle reported that "The Earl St. Vincent, Robley, from Shields to Jamaica, is taken and carried into Rochelle." Both the Register of Shipping (1806) and Lloyd's Register (1807) have the notation "captured" by her name.
