= Transport vessels for the British Government's importation of rice from Bengal (1800–1802) =

Weather-induced crop failures in Britain in 1799 and 1800, forced the British Government to import rice from Bengal to counter popular unrest. The wheat harvests of 1799 and 1800, were about one-half and three-quarters of the average, respectively. The price of bread rose sharply, leading to bread riots; some of the rioters invoked the French Revolution.

Because the British East India Company (EIC) had a legal monopoly on all trade between Britain and India, the Government had to have the EIC engage the transport vessels. The EIC chartered 28 vessels, comprising 14,785 tons (bm), to sail from England between December 1800, and February 1801, to bring back the rice. The decision to import rice from Bengal repeated a similar program in 1795–1796. That time the program involved at least 14 vessels, two of which the French captured and two of which were lost at sea.

In the 1800–1802, program most of the vessels returned between late 1801, and early 1802. One vessel was lost with all her cargo, and another was damaged and lost much of her cargo.

Emperor Paul I of Russia, in the context of the Second League of Armed Neutrality and the British Mediterranean campaign of 1798, on 18 November 1800, placed an embargo on all British shipping to Russia. The Russians seized some 200 British vessels in Russian ports, imprisoned some 4000–5000 crew members, and sequestrated some £1,500,000 in British property. The embargo lasted until 28 May 1801, and disrupted the grain trade with the Baltic. This in turn led to the British Government's decision in November 1800, to send a naval force to the Baltic once ice and weather conditions permitted.

In addition to the 28 vessels chartered for the purpose of bringing rice from Bengal, other vessels also brought back rice. The EIC had chartered Indian Chief as an extra ship for a voyage to Bengal. She arrived back at Gravesend on 30 September 1801, with 4150 bags of rice. She reported that when she had left Bengal in mid-May, the rice ships were preparing to sail in the next fortnight and that rice was readily available on the Bengal coast.

The "United Company of Merchants of England trading to the East Indies" offered 28,966 bags of rice for sale on 25 March 1802. The rice had come in on Travers, Melville Castle, Skelton Castle, and Mornington. On 30 March 1802, the Court of Directors of the United Company of Merchants trading with the East Indies (the EIC), announced that on 22 April, they would offer for sale 37,000 bags of rice brought by Hind, Hope, Minerva, Ceres, and Bellona. Hope had been launched at Calcutta early in 1801, and apparently was engaged there to carry rice to Britain on what would have been her maiden voyage.

Vessel	Master	Burthen (bm) (Note: Burthen is a volumetric measure of a vessel's size and does not translate into absolute tonnage of cargo a vessel can carry. All one may infer is that a vessel with a greater burthen can carry more cargo than one with a lesser burthen.)	Agent or owner
Active	John Greitin Smyth	500	
Automasia	Anthony Curtis	960	Prinsep & Saunders
Betsy, or Betsey	Charles Hooper	208	
Bellona	Edward Lamb	472	
Berrington	John Carse	816	Prinsep & Saunders
Bridgewater	George Lukin	799	Prinsep & Saunders
Ceres	Thomas Todd	455	Thomas Hall
Earl St Vincent	Richard Williams	341	Prinsep & Saunders
Eliza	Francis Holman	268	Prinsep & Saunders
Experiment	John Nelson Whyte	560	Robert Wigram
Ganges	Forster Brown	458	Prinsep & Saunders
Grant	William Peacoke	497	Prinsep & Saunders
Hind, or Hinde	William Caitline	400	
Loyalist	Francis Walton	526	Prinsep & Saunders
Malabar (Note: A fire destroyed Malabar in Madras Roads on 3 August 1801 as she was homeward bound. Her cargo of 12–13,000 bags of rice was lost.)	Thomas Kent	884	Prinsep & Saunders
Minerva	George Richardson	780	John Atkins
Nutwell	John Cristal (Note: Cristall drowned on 15 August 1801 during the voyage.)	378	Prinsep & Saunders
Perseverance	Nathaniel Downick	341	Prinsep & Saunders
Rose	Christopher Kymer	801	John Kymer
Scarborough	John Scott	429	Charles Kensington
Sir Edward Hamilton	Andrew Robertson	500	Robert Anderson
Sir John Borlase Warren	William James Davis	369	Prinsep & Saunders
Suffolk (Note: Suffolk was driven ashore at Cornwall near the end of her voyage. She was refloated but only part of her cargo of rice was saved.) (No.1)	John Robinson	430	Prinsep & Saunders
Suffolk (No.2)	John Luke	400	Prinsep & Saunders
Thames	Beevy Eilbeck	690	Matthew White
William Dent	Giles Musson	500	John Atkins
William Pitt	Richard Owens	798	Anthony Calvert
Young Nicholas	Richard Silby	400	Prinsep & Saunders
