= William Dent (1800 ship) =

History

Great Britain
- Name: William Dent
- Owner: John Atkins
- Builder: George Brown & William Oliver, Shoreham, Sussex
- Launched: 5 September 1800
- Fate: Disappeared January 1813

General characteristics
- Tons burthen: 475, or 475,31/94 or 500 (bm)
- Complement: 20
- Armament: 1800:10 × 9&6-pounder guns; Lloyd's Register:6 × 9-pounder + 4 × 6-pounder guns; 1814:10 × 12-pounder carronades
- Notes: Three decks

William Dent was launched in 1800, and then made one voyage for the British East India Company (EIC). On her return she became a West Indiaman. She disappeared in January 1813.

== Career ==
Captain Giles Masson received a letter of marque on 16 December 1800. William Dent first appears in Lloyd's Register in 1801 (published in 1800). It gives the name of her master as G. Musson, that of her owner as J. Atkins, and her trade as London−India. (Subsequent editions change the destination to Bengal.)

Mr. John Atkins had tendered William Dent, Giles Musson, master, to the EIC to bring back rice from Bengal. She was one of 28 vessels that sailed on that mission between December 1800 and February 1801.

William Dent left England on 24 January 1801, and returned on 13 April 1802.

On her return William Dent started trading with Jamaica and the Americas generally.

Year	Master	Owner	Trade	Source and notes
1804	G. Musson	J. Atkins	London–Jamaica	Register of Shipping (RS)
1809	G. Mosson	J. Atkins	London–Jamaica	RS

Incidents William Dent left Jamaica in August 1806, in a convoy of 109 vessels under escort by HMS Veteran, Magicienne, Franchise, and Penguin. On 18 August, the convoy left the Gulf of Mexico. The August 1806 Great Coastal hurricane caught the convoy between 21 and 24 August. Some 20 vessels were lost, but William Dent survived. (Vessels lost included Exeter, Herculean, and Nutwell.)

William Dent was with a convoy of 21 vessels from Jamaica on 28 August 1808, at 28°16′N 17°00′W, and under escort by HMS Hunter. William Dent was one of six vessels from Jamaica that lost their anchors in Margate Roads on 14 October 1808.

Lloyd's Register for 1814, still shows G. Musson as master, J. Atkins as owner, and William Dent's trade as London–Jamaica.

== Fate ==
HMS Brazen left Jamaica for London escorting a convoy that left on 19 December 1812, and included William Dent. During a heavy gale from 21 to 24 January 1813, William Dent, Jameson, master, and three other ships, parted from the convoy off the Newfoundland Banks; none of the four was ever heard from again. Brazen arrived at Spithead on 9 February 1813.
