= Phoenix (East Indiaman) =

Numerous ships with the name Phoenix, for the constellation or the mythical bird, have sailed for the British East India Company (EIC) between 1680 and 1821:

== Merchant vessels, including East Indiamen ==
- Phoenix (c. 1670 ship), rated at 380/450 tons burthen (bm), of 90 crew and 30 guns. Made three voyages to Madras, Bengal, Bantam, or China between 1671 and 1680. She was lost off the Isles of Scilly on 11 January 1680 while on her fourth voyage. She made two voyages to Madras, Bengal, Persia, and what is now Indonesia before being lost near Bream Ledge in the isles of Scilly after returning from Amoy China. Her wreckage was finally found by diver Todd Stevens in 2017 & he recovered over 400 gold and silver coins and 76 items of gold jewellery from the Phoenix wreck site as a result.
- Phoenix served the EIC between 1685 and 1687. She may have been the armed merchantman Phoenix that assisted the Royal Navy in 1689 at the siege of Derry.
- Phoenix (1700), rated at 400 tons, of 80 crew and 24-30 guns, launched November 1700 for Sir Henry Johnson, Blackwall. Made two voyages before being sold out of EIC service in 1709. (Note: The British Library directory conflates this vessel's voyages with the voyage of her successor.)
- Phoenix (1708), rated at 400 tons (bm), launched in 1708 by Sir Henry Johnson, Blackwall. She was lost on 13 April 1710 while on her first voyage. (Note: The British Library directory conflates this vessel's voyage with the voyages of her predecessor.)
- Phoenix (1785), of 800 tons (bm) and launched in 1785, made six voyages for the EIC between 1786 and 1802. She was sent out to India in 1803 for the local coastal trade.
- Phoenix (1790 ship), launched in 1790 by Randall & Brent, Rotherhithe. She made one voyage to Madras and Bengal between 1799 and 1800 as an extra ship (i.e., on short-term charter) for the EIC. She was condemned in 1812.
- Phoenix (1804 EIC ship) made six voyages to Madras and Bengal between 1805 and 1819; er registration was cancelled on 25 September 1821 after she was broken up.
- Phoenix (1810 ship) was launched in 1810. The EIC chartered her to make one voyage to Madras and Bengal between 1820 and 1821. She then made three voyages transporting convicts to Australia before she was wrecked at Simon's Bay, South Africa, in July 1829.

== Licensed ships ==
After the EIC lost its monopoly in 1813 on the Britain-East Indies trade, the EIC licensed other vessels to trade with the East Indies. The following three vessels sailed under such licenses, though it does not appear that any of them ever carried a cargo for the EIC.

- Phoenix (1798 ship), of 590 tons (bm), launched on the Thames. She made one voyage transporting convicts to Australia in 1824 and was broken up in 1837.
- Phoenix (1799 ship), of 478 tons (bm), launched in India in 1799 and wrecked on 1 March 1816 on Maranilla Reef while sailing from Havana to Nassau, Bahamas.
- Phoenix (1811 ship), of 404 tons (bm), launched at Philadelphia in 1811, captured and sold as a prize to W. Browne & Co., who retained the name. She was last listed in 1833 with trade Liverpool–Java.

== See also ==
- List of vessels of the Bombay Marine, and the Bombay and Bengal Pilot Services named Phoenix
- HMS Phoenix
