= Bush & Dreghorn (1798 ship) =

British merchantman (1798–1815)

History

Great Britain
- Name: Bush & Dreghorn
- Launched: 1798, Leith
- Fate: Wrecked 1815

General characteristics
- Tons burthen: 116, or 117 (bm)
- Sail plan: Brig
- Armament: 2 × 3-pounder guns

Bush & Dreghorn was a merchantman launched in 1798 at Leith. Between November 1800 and May 1801, she was one of 100–200 British merchantmen detained by the Imperial Russian Government in the Baltic. In 1812 a French privateer captured her as she was sailing as a transport, but the British Royal Navy recaptured her. She was wrecked in January 1815.

== Career ==
Bush & Dreghorn first appeared in Lloyd's Register (LR) in 1798 at Leith as Bush & Dughorn with R.Bruce, master, and A.Hill, owner.

Russian captivity: Emperor Paul I of Russia, in the context of the Second League of Armed Neutrality and the British Mediterranean campaign of 1798, on 18 November 1800 placed an embargo on all British shipping to Russia. The Russians seized over 100 British vessels in Russian ports, imprisoned some 4000–5000 crew members, and sequestrated some £1,500,000 in British property. Bush and Dreghorn was one of the vessels arrested.

The captains and crew of the detained vessels were to be distributed about the countryside in over a hundred towns from one to two thousand miles from Saint Petersburg. However, they did not have clothing suitable for the increasingly cold weather. The British Consul General in Russia, Stephen Shairp and the British merchants in Saint Petersburg arranged a relief effort. They gathered 40,000 rubles (each ruble being worth about 2s and 6d, so the amount was equal to £5,000). Each captain received 200 rubles (£25), for himself and up to ten men. Also, each man received a sheepskin coat, a sash (scarf), a hat, warm shoes, and two pair of stockings. The relief fund also provided for carts for most of the captains to carry their possessions and those of their men.

The embargo lasted until 28 May 1801, and disrupted the grain trade with the Baltic. This in turn led to the British Government's decision in November 1800 to send a naval force to the Baltic once ice and weather conditions permitted. It also led the British government to arrange for the British East India Company to charter almost 20 large vessels to import rice from Bengal.

Year	Master	Owner	Trade	Source
1800	R.Bruce	A.Hill	Leith	LR
1805	William	Captain & Co.	London–Gibraltar	LR
1810	Williams; S.Meggs	Parnel & Co. Paul & Co.	London–Gibraltar; Portsmouth transport	RS
1812	S.Magg	Peck	Portsmouth transport	RS; thorough repair 1807

On 4 October 1812 HMS Doterel arrived at Plymouth with the French privateer Elconore of 14 guns and 80 men. Dotterell had captured Elconore the day before off the Isles of Scilly. Elconore had captured the transport Bush & Dreghorn, from Lisbon. Official records reported that Doterel had been in company with Raven and Marlborough, that the privateer's name was Eleonore (or Leonore), and that she had been armed with 10 guns. (Note: Éléonore had been commissioned at Cherbourg in 1810 under Captain Alexander Black.)

The Navy recaptured Bush & Dreghorn. There is no break in the brig's listing in Lloyd's Register or the Register of Shipping (RS).

The Register of Shipping for 1816 showed Bush & Dreghorn with J.Higgins, master, Peck, owner, and trade Bristol–Trinidad.

== Fate ==
Bush & Dreghorn, Gelbert, master, was lost on 6 January 1815 near the "Tower of Montreuil" (or Tower of Montenil). She was on a voyage from Naples to Gallipoli, Apulia.
