= HMS Redbridge (1803) =

1800s cutter

History

United Kingdom
- Name: HMS Redbridge
- Builder: Nantes?
- Acquired: 12 September 1803 by capture
- Fate: Foundered 26 February 1805

General characteristics &
- Tons burthen: Privateer: 150 (French; "of load"); RN: 170 (bm)
- Length: 81 ft (25 m) or 24.7m
- Beam: 21 ft 6 in (6.6 m), or 6.5m
- Sail plan: Schooner
- Complement: 68 (privateer)
- Armament: Privateer: 2 × 4-pounder guns + 10 × 6-pounder carronades; Royal Navy: 12 guns

HMS Redbridge was the French privateer cutter Oiseau, which had been commissioned at Rochefort in August 1803. HMS Argo captured her in September 1803. The Royal Navy took her into service as HMS Redbridge. She foundered at Jamaica in February 1805.

== Capture ==
Oiseau began her cruise in August 1803.

Argo captured Oiseau on 12 September 1803. Oiseau was armed with ten guns and had a crew of 68 men under the command of Enseigne de vaisseau Nicholas Brune Daubin. Fire from Argo killed Oiseau's second lieutenant during the pursuit. Oiseau was nine days out of Rochfort and taken nothing.

Lieutenant Francis Blower Gibbes (acting) commissioned Redbridge in Jamaica in May 1804.

== Fate ==
Redbridge, Lieutenant Francis Gibbes, was at anchor in Pedro Bay, Jamaica, on 26 February 1805 when at around 7a.m. water was found to be entering. The crew used the pumps, attempted to bail, and tried to kedge her on to shore, but she foundered suddenly at about 9a.m. All the crew were rescued. The post-loss inquiry found that Redbridge was in poor condition and leaky.
