= Dutton (1781 EIC ship) =

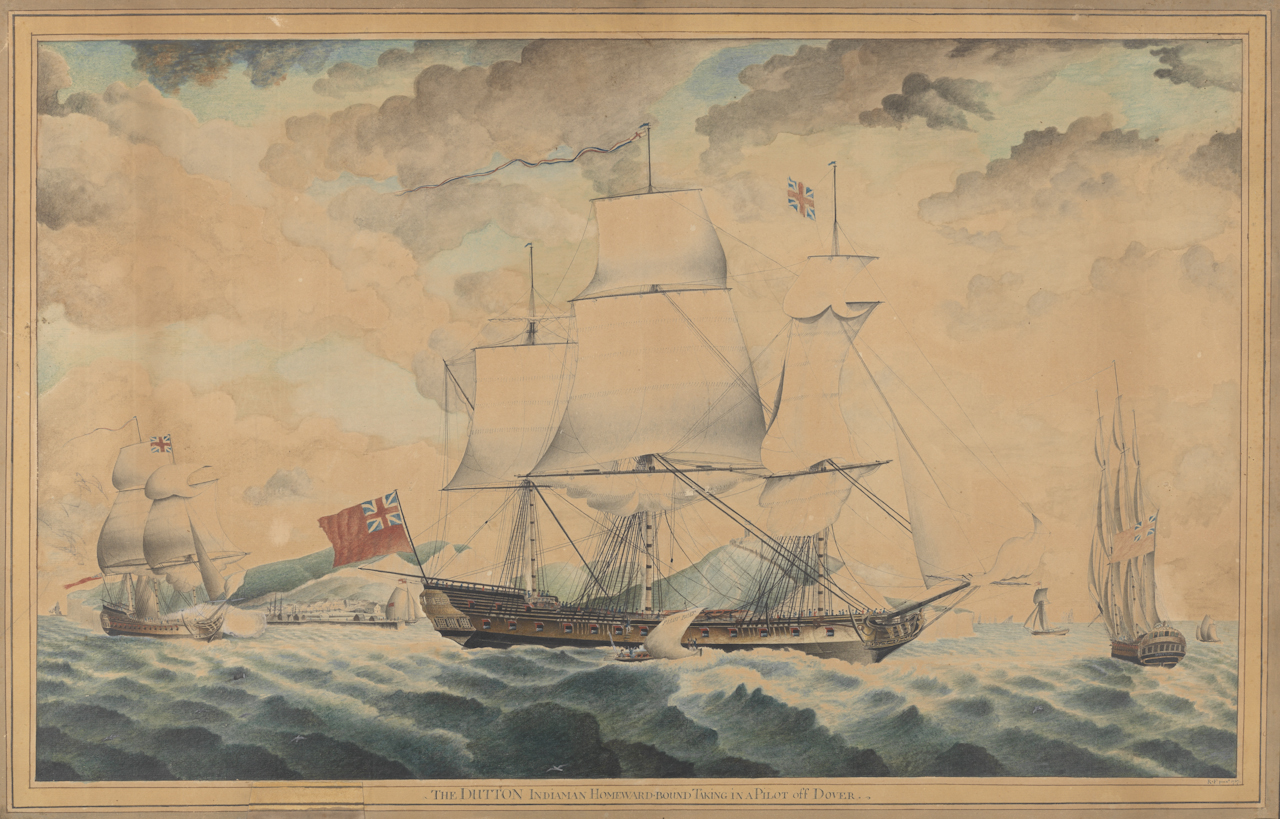
- The Dutton Indiaman homeward-bound taking in a pilot off Dover

History

British East India Company
- Name: Director
- Owner: Henry Rice
- Builder: Barnard, Deptford
- Launched: 13 July 1781
- Renamed: Dutton (before completion)
- Fate: Wrecked January 1796

General characteristics
- Tons burthen: 761, or 76191/94, or 780 (bm)
- Length: Overall:142 ft 9 in (43.5 m); Keel:115 ft 10 in (35.3 m) (keel)
- Beam: 35 ft 2 in (10.7 m)
- Depth of hold: 14 ft 9 in (4.5 m)
- Propulsion: Sails
- Sail plan: Full-rigged ship
- Complement: 100
- Armament: 26 × 9&6-pounder guns
- Notes: Three decks

Dutton was built by John Barnard at Barnard's Thames Yard at Deptford and launched in 1781 as an East Indiaman. She made five voyages for the British East India Company. She was wrecked in January 1796 while carrying troops for a military expedition to the West Indies.

== Career ==
EIC voyage #1 (1782–1784): Captain James West sailed from Portsmouth on 6 February 1782, bound for Madras, Bengal, and China. Dutton reached Rio de Janeiro on 30 April, Mozambique on 8 August, Bombay on 6 September, and Madras on 19 October. She arrived at Diamond Harbour on 8 December. Sailing for China, she was at Kedgeree on 15 January 1783. She reached Malacca on 22 August and arrived at Whampoa anchorage on 25 September. Homeward bound, she crossed the Second Bar on 5 December, reached St Helena on 22 March 1784, and arrived at Long Reach on 29 May.

Captain West of the Dutton Indiaman

EIC voyage #2 (1785–1786): Captain West sailed from Portsmouth on 17 April 1785, bound for Madras and Bengal. Dutton reached Johanna on 1 August, Madras on 7 September, and Cox's Island on 25 December. Homeward bound, she reached St Helena on 23 May 1786 and arrived at The Downs on 8 August.

EIC voyage #3 (1788–1789): Captain James Hunt sailed from The Downs on 7 January 1788, bound for Bombay and China. Dutton reached the Cape of Good Hope on 28 March, and Bombay on 6 June. She arrived at Whampoa on 5 October. Homeward bound, she crossed the Second Bar on 3 January 1789, reached St Helena on 29 April, and arrived at Long Reach on 12 July.

EIC voyage #4 (1791–1792): Captain James Hamilton sailed from The Downs on 27 March 1791, bound for Madras and Bengal. She reached Maio, Cape Verde, on 3 May and Madras on 12 August, and arrived at Diamond Harbour on 1 September. Homeward bound, she was at Saugor on 17 February 1792, reached Madras on 28 March and St Helena on 8 October, and arrived at Long Reach on 13 December.

EIC voyage #4 (1794–1795): Captain Peter Sampson acquired a letter of marque on 19 November 1793.

The British government held Dutton at Portsmouth, together with a number of other Indiamen in anticipation of using them as transports for an attack on Île de France (Mauritius). It gave up the plan and released the vessels in May 1794. It paid £2,687 10s for having delayed her departure by 129 days.

While Dutton was at Spithead, a mutiny broke out among the crew after Sampson had sent for a boat from a nearby warship to press some unruly members of his crew. Captain Haldane of Melville Castle rowed over to Dutton. He went on board where he talked with the mutineers, arresting the ringleaders and convincing the rest to return to work.

Dutton sailed from Portsmouth on 2 May 1794, bound for Madras and Bengal. She reached Madras on 11 September. She apparently did not go on to Bengal as by 7 January 1795 she was at St Helena and by 25 July at Long Reach.

== Fate ==
Wreck of the Dutton at Plymouth Sound, 26 January 1796, by Thomas Luny

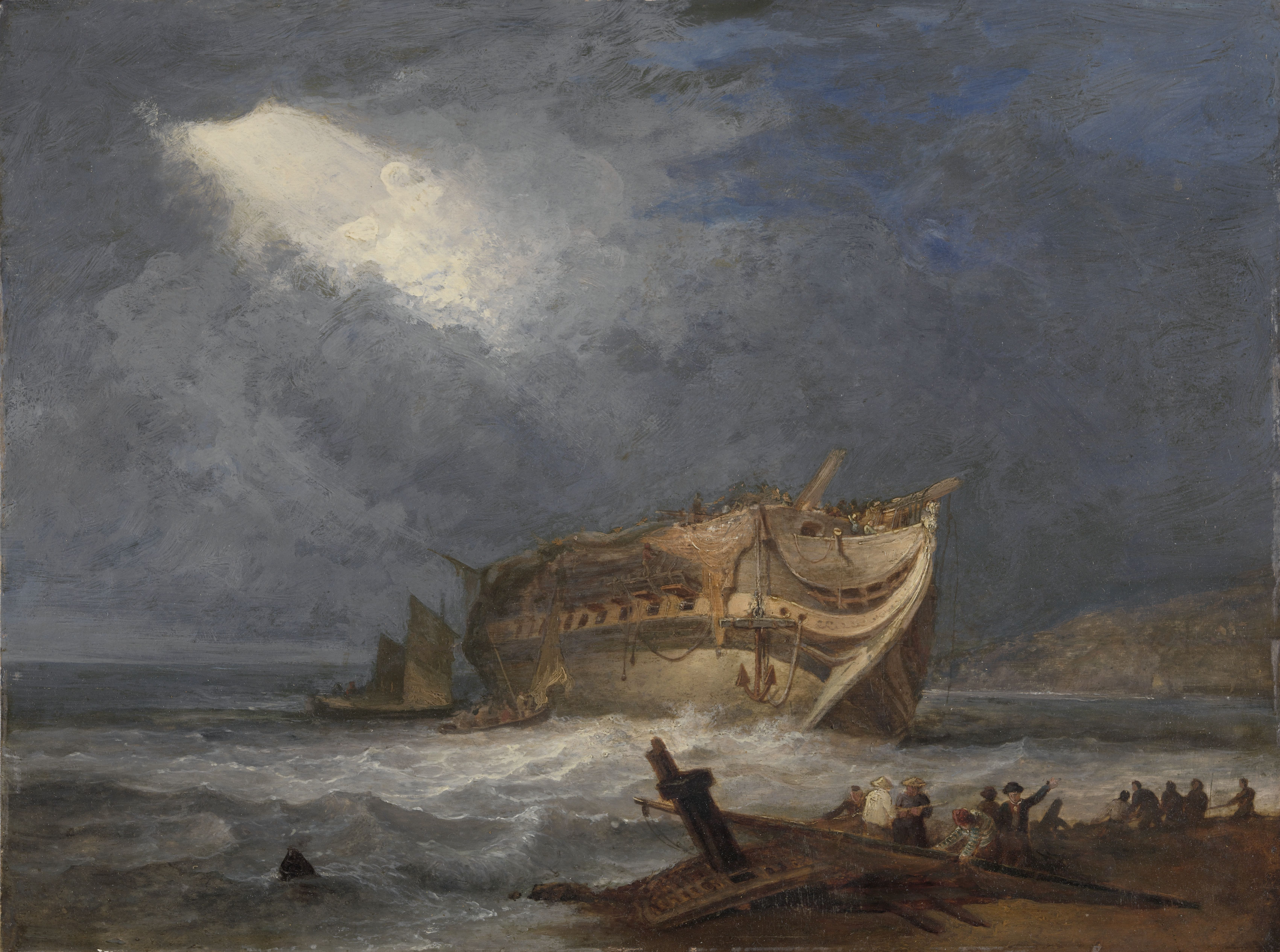
The Wreck of the Dutton, by Samuel Prout

On 25 July 1795 the British government took up Dutton and many other Indiamen and other ships for Admiral Hugh Cloberry Christian's expedition to the West Indies to carry the troops under the command of Lieutenant-General Sir Ralph Abercromby.

The expedition sailed from Plymouth on 6 October, 16 November, and 9 December, but weather forced the vessels to put back. Dutton was among the vessels that put into Plymouth on 25 January 1796 with most of her troops sick. The next day she dragged her anchors in a heavy gale and grounded under the Citadel flagstaff at Plymouth.

Most of her crew and the soldiers aboard her were rescued, but with difficulty. Due to the heavy seas, the crew and soldiers aboard were unable to get to shore. Edward Pellew, captain of HMS Indefatigable, swam out to the wreck with a line and, with help from Lieutenant Jeremiah Coghlan, helped rig a lifeline that saved almost all aboard. For this feat he was created a baronet on 18 March 1796. Somewhere between two and 20 men were lost.

Dutton had broken her back and was a total loss. The wreck was sold for £850.
