= Alligator (1793 ship) =

British Ship

History

Great Britain
- Name: Alligator
- Namesake: Alligator
- Owner: 1793:Robert Curling; 1807:Granger
- Builder: Thomas Pitcher, Northfleet
- Launched: 23 September 1793
- Fate: Wrecked 1820

General characteristics
- Tons burthen: 301, or 341, or 343, or 34470/94 or 343, or later 356, (bm)
- Length: 102 ft 4 1/4 in (31.2 m) (overall); 80 ft 6 in (24.5 m) (keel)
- Beam: 28 ft 4 1/2 in (8.6 m)
- Depth of hold: 12 ft 5 in (3.8 m)
- Propulsion: Sail
- Complement: 1797:26; 1807:25
- Armament: 1797:8 × 6-pounder guns + 6 swivel guns; 1807:12 × 6&9-pounder guns + 4 swivels; 1807:4 × 9-pounder + 12 × 6-pounder guns; 1809:14 × 6&9&12-pounder guns + 4 swivels
- Notes: Two decks

Alligator was launched in 1793 at London. She made one voyage for the British East India Company (EIC). She then became a general trader crossing the Atlantic. She was wrecked in 1820.

== Career ==
Alligator entered Lloyd's Register (LR) in 1794 with Robert Curling, master, Curling, owner, and trade London-Jamaica. In 1798 the EIC had Cox measure Alligator prior to their employing her as an "extra ship", i.e., under charter. Then Captain Robert Curling received a letter of marque on 9 August.

Captain Robert Curling sailed from Portsmouth on 13 September 1798, bound for Madras and Bengal. Alligator was part of a large convoy of merchantmen and transports, all under the escort of HMS Argo, HMS Pomone, and HMS Cormorant. The convoy included three East Indiamen: Royal Charlotte, Cuffnells, and Phoenix. On 25 September the convoy encountered a French fleet of nine sail, consisting of one 80-gun ship and eight frigates. The convoy commander signaled the East Indiamen to form line of battle with the Royal Navy ships, and the convoy to push for Lisbon. This manoeuvre, and the warlike appearance of the Indiamen, deterred the French admiral from attacking them. The whole fleet reached Lisbon in safety, with Alligator arriving on 28 September.

Alligator reached the Cape of Good Hope on 30 December. She arrived at Madras on 12 April 1799, and Calcutta on 11 May. Homeward bound, she was at St Helena on 13 February 1800, and arrived at Deptford on 18 April.

Alligator then became a general trader on to the West Indies and in the North Atlantic.

On 29 August 1807 Captain Robert Granger received a letter of marque. Lloyd's Register for 1807 shows Alligator's master as Wilson, changing to Granger, her owner as Granger, and her trade as London-St Vincent.

On 25 June 1809 Captain Thomas Ashton received a letter of marque. Lloyd's Register for 1809 shows her master changing from Morton to Ashton, her owner as Granger, and her trade as London-Haiti.

In a letter from Captain Aston that the Naval Chronicle received in August–September 1817, he reported that while Alligator was in the West Indies, the Buenos Aires privateer Porpoise had taken Alligator and plundered her. He further reported that there were British subjects amongst the privateers, and that a crewman on Alligator had recognized one of the privateers as a man that he had served with in the Royal Navy.

Lloyd's Register for 1820 shows Alligator's master as Goddard, changing to W. Maddick, her owner as Nevin & Co., and her trade as London to New York, changing to Waterford to Quebec.

== Fate ==
On 13 May 1820 Alligator wrecked two miles below L'Islet, on the St. Lawrence River. Her crew were saved. Alligator, Maddock, master, from Waterford, was one of several vessels wrecked in the St. Lawrence in May.
