= List of ships named Phoenix =

The British East India Company (EIC) maintained its own navy, the Bombay Marine, and a number of pilot services. The following Bombay Marine or Pilot Service vessels bore the name Phoenix for the constellation or the mythical bird

- Phoenix, a ketch acquired or launched in 1673 and sold to buyers at Bombay in 1679.
- Phoenix, a sloop that the EIC's governor of Bencoolen used in 1710.
- Phoenix, a schooner that the Bombay Pilot Service used and sold on 30 April 1759 for breaking up.
- Phoenix, a schooner of 113 tons (bm) that the Bombay Dockyard launched in 1667, or 1770 for the Bengal Pilot Service, and that was sold to local buyers in June 1778.
- Phoenix, agent vessel, of 181 tons (bm), launched 1808 at Kidderpore and sold 18 October 1820.

== See also ==
- Phoenix (East Indiaman)
- HMS Phoenix
