= Radnor (1813 ship) =

Ship

History

United Kingdom
- Name: Radnor
- Namesake: Radnorshire
- Owner: 1813:Boehm & Co.; 1814:Hughes & Co.
- Builder: Anthony Blackmore, Sulkia, Calcutta
- Launched: 9 September 1813
- Fate: Burnt 3 September 1815

General characteristics
- Tons burthen: 455, or 47821/94 (bm)
- Length: 114 ft 7 in (34.9 m) (keel)
- Beam: 30 ft 8 in (9.3 m)
- Propulsion: Sail
- Armament: 14 × 12-pounder carronades

Radnor was launched on 9 September 1813 at Sulkea, Calcutta. She then sailed to England.

Radnor was admitted to the Registry of Great Britain on 16 April 1814. She was sold in England and appeared in the Register of Shipping for 1815 with Barclay, master, Hogue, owner, and trade London–Île de France.

A fire destroyed Radnor on 3 September 1815 off Saugor with the loss of thirteen of her crew.

The loss of Radnor to fire, followed by that of Mornington and some other vessels, all on outward-bound voyages, led the Calcutta Insurance Office to petition the Bengal government to investigate the matter. The insurers suspected arson by lascars impressed or induced to serve on the vessels.
