= HMS Argo (1781) =

British Roebuck-class ship

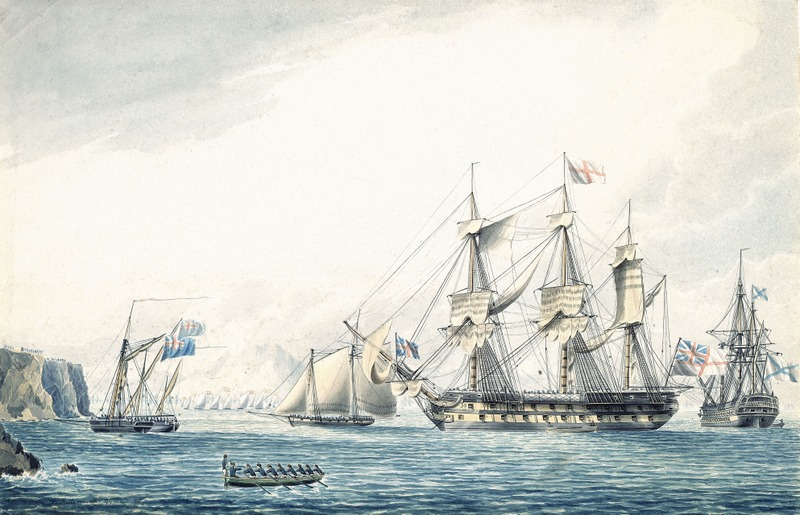
- The Argo serving as flagship at Gibraltar, 1799. In the collection of the National Maritime Museum; Thomas Buttersworth; 19th century.

History

Great Britain
- Name: HMS Argo
- Ordered: 26 February 1779
- Builder: John Baker & Co, Howden Pans, Newcastle-upon-Tyne
- Laid down: 18 August 1779
- Launched: 7 June 1781
- Completed: 15 October 1781
- Fate: Sold on 11 January 1816

General characteristics
- Class & type: 44-gun Roebuck-class fifth rate
- Tons burthen: 89221/94 (bm)
- Length: Overall: 140 ft 8 in (42.9 m); Keel: 115 ft 8 in (35.3 m)
- Beam: 38 ft 0 3/4 in (11.6 m)
- Depth of hold: 16 ft 4 1/2 in (5.0 m)
- Propulsion: Sails
- Sail plan: Full-rigged ship
- Complement: 280 (300 from 1783)
- Armament: As built: Lower deck (LD): 22 × 18-pounder guns; Upper deck (UD): 22 × 9-pounder guns; Fc: 2 × 6-pounder guns; After April 1793: LD: 22 × 24-pounder carronades; UD: 20 × 12-pounder guns; QD: 4 × 24-pounder carronades; FC: 2 × 24-pounder carronades; After November 1793: LD: 22 × 18-pounder guns; UD: 20 × 12-pounder guns; QD: 4 × 24-pounder carronades; Fc: 2 × 24-pounder carronades; After September 1809: LD: 20 × Gover's 24-pounder guns (Note: John Gover designed a new type of gun-carriage in the late 1790s or early 1800s that enabled smaller gun crews to handle the guns and the guns to be stored alongside the rails rather than perpendicular to them.); UD: 22 × Gover's 24-pounder guns; QD: 4 × 24-pounder carronades; Fc: 2 × 6-pounder guns + 2 × 24-pounder carronades

HMS Argo was a 44-gun fifth-rate Roebuck-class ship of the Royal Navy. She was launched in 1781 from Howdon Dock. The French captured her in 1783, but 36 hours later the British recaptured her. She then distinguished herself in the French Revolutionary Wars by capturing several prizes, though she did not participate in any major actions. She also served in the Napoleonic Wars. She was sold in 1816.

== Baltic ==
Argo was commissioned in March 1781 under Captain John Butchart. On 29 October Argo sailed for the Baltic with Albemarle, under the command of Captain Horatio Nelson and Enterprise, arriving at Elsinor on 4 November. On 8 December the squadron, now under the command of Captain Douglas in Sampson, escorted a convoy of 280 vessels to Britain, arriving on 22 December.

== Gold Coast ==
Early in 1782, Argo joined Captain Thomas Shirley in the 50-gun ship Leander and the sloop-of-war Alligator off the Dutch Gold Coast. Britain was at war with The Netherlands and before Argo arrived Shirley captured the small Dutch forts at Mouri (Fort Nassau - 20 guns), Kormantin (Courmantyne or Fort Amsterdam - 32 guns), Apam (Fort Lijdzaamheid or Fort Patience - 22 guns), Senya Beraku (Berku, or Fort Barracco, or Fort Goede Hoop - 18 guns), and Accra (Fort Crêvecoeur or Ussher Fort - 32 guns). Argo provided a landing party of 50 men who assisted Governor Mills to take Komenda (Fort Komenda).

== Capture and recapture ==
In 1782 Argo was on her passage to the West Indies under Captain Butchart when she captured the French ship Dauphin, nominally of 64 guns but armed en flute and so sailing with only 26 guns mounted. Dauphin had a cargo of military stores and provisions, some brass cannons and mortars, and two hundred soldiers, all bound for Martinique.

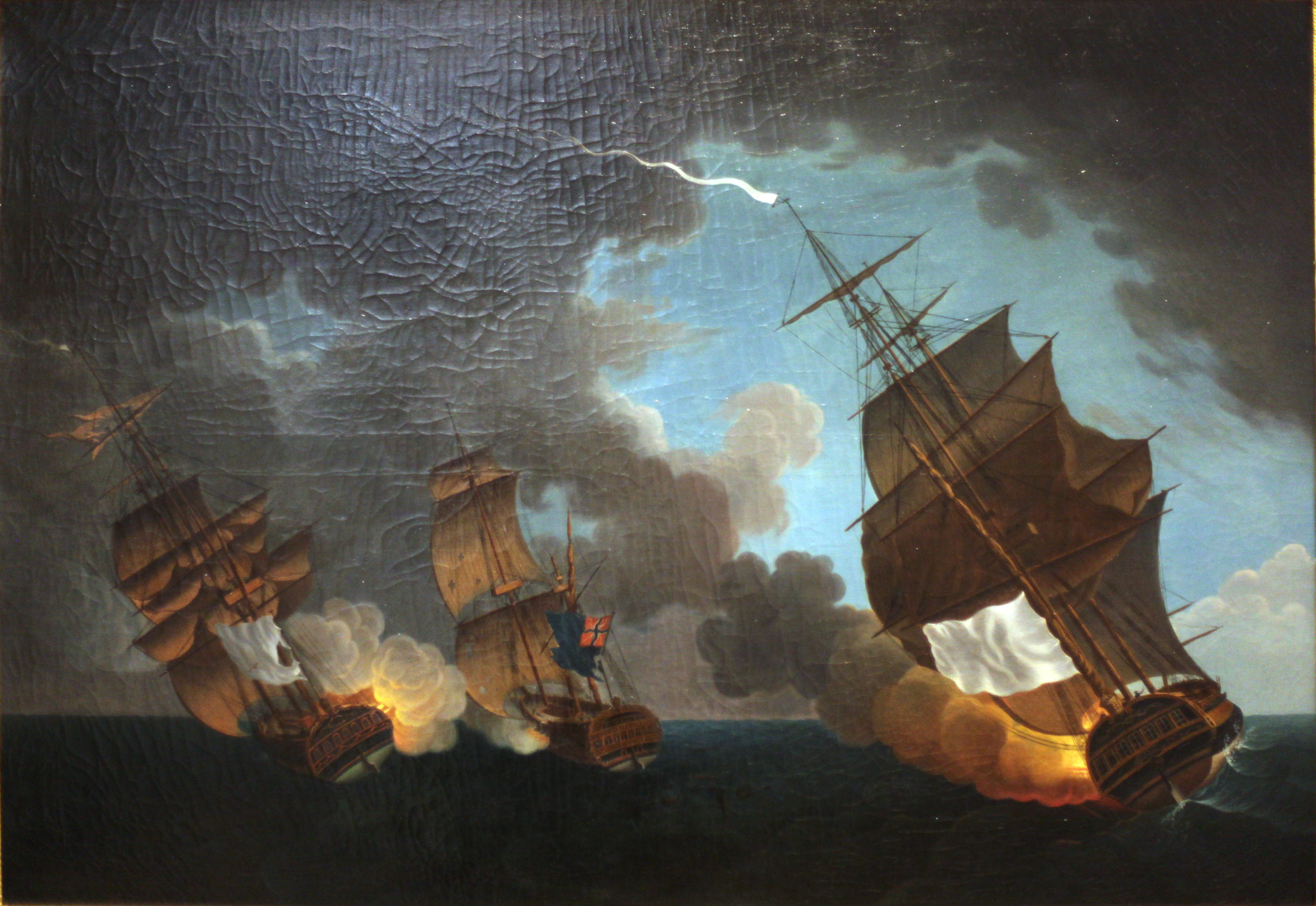
Battle between the French frigates Nymphe, Amphitrite, and the 44-gun two-decker HMS Argo, 17 February 1783, by Auguste-Louis de Rossel de Cercy.

Governor Thomas Shirley of the Leeward Islands had Argo carry him to Tortola where he had official business. Argo stayed there three weeks until Shirley was ready to return to Antigua. The French found out about this and sent the 36-gun French frigate Nymphe and the 32-gun Amphitrite to intercept him.

On 16 February 1783, Argo and the two French frigates met. After a five-hour action they captured her. Not only did they out gun Argo, but the sea was so rough that she could not open her lower ports. Argo had lost thirteen men killed and had suffered a number of wounded, as well as having suffered damage to her masts and rigging. Governor Shirley had stayed on deck throughout the engagement.

About 36 hours later, the 74-gun third rate HMS Invincible, under Captain Charles Saxton was coming from Jamaica when she encountered the two French frigates and their prize, Argo. The frigates fled, leaving Invincible to recapture Argo. Captain J. Douglas briefly took command.

After a court martial acquitted her officers, Admiral Sir Hugh Pigot reappointed them. Then Captain J. Douglas briefly took command. She returned to England after the Peace of Paris (1783) and was paid off in April 1784.

Argo underwent repairs at Sheerness between July 1785 and October 1786. She then was fitted as a troopship at Chatham from about June 1790 to April 1791. She was recommissioned in February 1791 under Commander Sandford Tatham, who sailed her for Halifax on 11 May. Argo was paid off in June 1792.

== French Revolutionary Wars ==
Captain William Clarke recommissioned Argo in May 1793. Captain Richard Rundle Burgess (or Burges) replaced him in February 1795.

In September 1795, Argo was part of the force escorting 63 merchants of the Levant convoy from Gibraltar. The other escorts were the 74-gun ships HMS Fortitude and HMS Bedford, the 32-gun frigates HMS Juno and HMS Lutine, the fireship HMS Tisiphone, and the recently captured Censeur. The convoy called at Gibraltar on 25 September, at which point thirty-two of the merchants left that night in company with Argo and Juno. The rest of the fleet sailed together, reaching Cape St Vincent by the early morning of 7 October. At this point a sizeable French squadron was sighted bearing up, consisting of six ships of the line and three frigates under Rear-Admiral Joseph de Richery. Eventually Censeur had to strike, and the remaining British warships and one surviving merchant of the convoy made their escape. On 17 October Argo and Juno brought in their convoy of 32 vessels from Gibraltar.

Captain John Stevens Hall took command of Argo in June 1796.

=== 1798 ===
In March 1798 Captain James Bowen took over command of Argo. On 5 May she encountered Captain Sir Sidney Smith, who was in an open boat in the Channel, having escaped via Havre de Grace from "the Temple" in Paris.

Argo sailed for the Mediterranean in September 1798. Argo, HMS Pomone, and HMS Cormorant convoyed a large fleet of merchantmen and transports to Lisbon. The convoy included the East Indiamen Royal Charlotte, Cuffnells, Phoenix, and Alligator. On 25 September the convoy encountered a French fleet of nine sail, consisting of one eighty-gun ship and eight frigates. The convoy commander signalled the East Indiamen to form line of battle with the Royal Navy ships, and the convoy to push for Lisbon. This manoeuvre, and the warlike appearance of the Indiamen, deterred the French admiral from attacking them; the whole fleet reached Lisbon in safety.

Argo remained in the Mediterranean, serving with Commodore Duckworth. On 29 September Argo captured the Nostra Seniora de la Aldea.

In November Argo participated in the reduction of Menorca. Argo supported the landing of British troops. When four or five Spanish vessels were spotted, the British squadron sailed to catch them. The Spaniards consisted of four frigates and a sloop. The four Spanish frigates - the Flora, Casilda, Proserpine and Pomona - had been on their way from Barcelona to Mahon with the payroll of eight million reales for the troops there when they encountered sloop-of-war Peterel and captured her on 12 November. The Spanish frigates escaped their pursuers and sailed back to Cartagena, Spain.

Duckworth detached Argo to pursue the sloop and on 13 November she retook Peterel and her 72-man Spanish prize crew under the command of Don Antonio Franco Gandrada, Second Captain of Flora. Bownen put his own prize crew of 46 officers seamen and marines aboard.

On 22 November Argo captured the Spanish ship Virgin Solidad at sea. The Virgin Solidad was carrying a cargo of rags to Barcelona. At some point Argo also captured the Madona del Rosario.

=== 1799 ===
On 6 February 1799, Argo and Leviathan surprised two Spanish frigates at anchor near the south point of the Bahia de Alcudia on Majorca. The Spanish set sail with the British in pursuit. A violent westerly gale came up that took away Leviathan's main top-sail. After dark the Spanish frigates separated but Leviathan had fallen behind and saw neither the separation nor Argo's signal that she chase the one to port. Leviathan had nearly caught up with Argo when Argo got alongside the Santa Theresa about midnight. Argo fired a broadside that wounded two men and badly damaged Santa Theresa's rigging. At this point the Spaniard surrendered. She was of upwards of 950 tons burthen, carrying 42 guns plus coehorns and swivel guns. In addition to her crew of 280 seamen and marines under the command of Don Pablo Perez, she had 250 soldiers on board. Santa Theresa had recently been completely refurbished and provisioned for a four-month cruise. Her consort Proserpine, which had escaped, though smaller, was equally well-armed.

Then on 16 February Centaur, Argo and Leviathan attacked the town of Cambrelles. Once the defenders had abandoned their battery, the boats went in. The British dismounted the guns, burnt five settees and brought out another five settees or tartans laden with wine and wheat. One tartan, the Velon Maria, was a letter of marque, armed with one brass and two iron 12-pounders and two 3-pounders. She had a crew of 14 men.

In May Argo sailed to Algiers to arrange with the Dey for a supply of fresh provisions for the British forces in Menorca. While there Bowen achieved the release of six British subjects that the Algerians had held as slaves for more than 14 years.

In July 1799, Argo carried Admiral the Earl StVincent home from Gibraltar at the end of his time in command of the Mediterranean fleet.

On 6 August Argo captured the Spanish sloop Infanta Amelia off Portugal. She was a packet ship, which the Royal Navy took in as Porpoise. After her capture, Infanta Amelia took Earl St Vincent, who had been aboard Argo after resigning his command of the Mediterranean station, to Portsmouth, arriving there on 18 August.

=== 1800 ===
In early 1800 Argo captured three privateers: Independente (1 March), San Antonio (2 March) and Arlequin (1 May). On 18 March, the French privateer Vengeance, of 16 guns and 135 men, captured at Lat. 42° 16' Long. 16°, the packet Jane, which was sailing from Falmouth to Barbados and Jamaica. A week later Argo recaptured the Jane and sent her back into Falmouth.

On 19 August 1800 Argo captured the Spanish lugger St Antonio in ballast. Argo sent her in to Plymouth.

On 21 October, after a 15-hour chase, Argo captured the Spanish letter of marque San Fernando, which was pierced for 22 guns but carried twelve long 6-pounders. She had a crew of 53 men. San Fernando was five days out of Santander and sailing to Vera Cruz with a cargo of iron bars and bale goods that belonged to the Royal Philippine Company. She was also carrying government dispatches but had thrown them overboard before the British boarded her.

Bowen also reported, but without giving further details, that during the same cruise he had captured four merchant vessels, two of which he sent in to port as prizes and two of which he sank. The two sent in were the French brig Maria Louisa, in ballast, and the Spanish barque Vincento, carrying iron ore. The vessels that he sank were also Spanish barques carrying iron ore.

=== 1801 ===
On 14 January 1801 Argo was off Ferrol serving as escort for Mornington, Exeter, and Eliza Ann, which were bound for India, and a whaler. They encountered a small Spanish ship that Argo captured.

Then in March, Argo brought into Plymouth the Spanish ship Bolientorio, which had been sailing from Havana to Tenerife.

Argo and Carysfort escorted five transports carrying the 85th Regiment of Foot and forty artillerymen from Cowes on 24 June. They arrived in Portsmouth on 28 June and then sailed again on a "secret mission". They had to put back into Torbay on 11 July.

Later in 1801 the East India Company gave Bowen 400 guineas for the purchase of plate in gratitude for his having escorted from St Helena to England ten vessels either belonging to the company or carrying its cargo. Then in January 1802 the British merchants of Madeira gave Captain Bowen a sword for his services.

== Napoleonic Wars ==
Captain Benjamin Hallowell commissioned Argo in August 1802, and in November sailed to the African coast, returning the next year. Next, she sailed to the West Indies where she participated in the captures of St Lucia and Tobago.

On 12 September 1803 Argo captured the French privateer cutter Oiseau. Oiseau was armed with ten guns and had a crew of 68 men under the command of Enseigne de Vaisseau Nicholas Brune Daubin. Fire from Argo killed Oiseau's second lieutenant during the pursuit. Oiseau was nine days out of Rochfort and taken nothing. That same month, on the 24th, Argo recaptured the brig Rover, which the privateer Adventure, of Bordeaux, had captured as Rover was sailing from Bristol to Newfoundland.

On 25 December a tremendous gale hit Portsmouth and several outward-bound West Indiamen drifted from their anchors. One of them, the Matthew, bound to Jamaica, ran into Argo. In doing so, she carried away Argo's top mast and yards. Other West Indiamen came on shore. Captain Thomas Le Marchant Gosselin commanded her briefly in 1804 before taking command of Ville de Paris in February 1804. (Note: The Naval Chronicle reports that Gosselin took command in May.) On 31 January, 1804 she arrived at Malta from England on the way to Alexandria transporting one of the Beys of the Momalucks of Egypt. She and HMS Agincourt arrived at Malta from Egypt 15 March, 1804.

Captain Edward Codrington took command in July 1804 and Captain George Aldham replaced him in May 1805. (Note: Marshall provides contradictory information in the same volume. In one place he reports that Codrington served on Argo, and then later reports that Codrington declined the appointment.) A Captain Rickets briefly took command in July 1806 only to have Captain Stephen Thomas Digby replace him within the month.

In 1806 Digby again sailed Argo to the coast of Africa. In 1808 she was at Jamaica. In 1809, Argo and the brig-sloop Sparrow were blockading the town of Santo Domingo while a Spanish force invested it from the landward side. The British and Spaniards agreed a joint attack. The two British vessels came in close to the detached fort of St. Jerome and silenced it with their guns while losing only two men wounded. However the Spanish land attack failed.

On 9 March 1809, Argo's boats cut out the French navy felucca Joseph. Joseph was armed with a brass 9-pounder gun and two 3-pounders. She had a crew of 53 men under the command of Enseign de Vaisseau Jean Botin. Joseph was anchored under the guns of several shore batteries at St. Domingo. Her crew put up a strong resistance that, together with the fire from the batteries, wounded seven of Argo's men. However, most of the French crew then fled ashore with the result that Argo only captured 19 of them. Joseph arrived at Jamaica on 5 April.

On 8 July 1809 Argo was off Havanah, escorting the fleet from Jamaica.

In January 1810 Captain Frederick Warren became captain of Argo, after serving as acting captain of Melpomene. He sailed her for St. Helena and from there he convoyed a large fleet of East Indiamen to England.

On 28 November he faced a court martial on board Gladiator at Portsmouth. The charge was that he had failed to follow orders to proceed to Quebec to bring home a convoy. He argued that the reason he had not sailed was that it was late in the year and that the weather was bad. The court accepted his reasoning and acquitted him.

Early in 1811 Argo carried Sir Joseph Sydney Yorke to Portugal, together with reinforcements for the British army there. Argo then took out an Algerine Ambassador. Lastly, she sailed for Constantinople with Sir Robert Liston and his suite on 6 April 1812.

Between 22 and 29 August 1812, Argo detained the Eliza, Leslie, master, sailing from Malta, and sent her into Gibraltar.

Captain Cornelius Quinton replaced Warren in October 1812. Argo then served as the flagship for Vice-Admiral Charles Stirling. Argo sailed for Jamaica on 22 January 1813.

In April 1813 Captain William Fothergill took command of Argo. She then served as Rear-Admiral W. Brown's flagship on the Jamaica station.

On 1 June Argo recaptured Cantonada. Cantonada had been sailing from Cadiz to Havana when a Carthaginian privateer captured her. The recaptured Cantonada reached Jamaica on 24 June. On 4 June Argo captured the Fly, which had been sailing from Jacmel to Wilmington. Fly arrived at Jamaica on 17 April. On 21 September 1813 Argo was to escort a convoy to Bermuda.

Argo departed Port Royal on 1 November 1814, accompanied by Contest, with a convoy of 20 merchantmen. Her arrival at Portsmouth was reported in Lloyd's List dated 16 December 1814.

In 1815 Captain Donald M'Cloud took command. Argo then served on the Downs station as flagship for Rear-Admiral Matthew Scott.

== Fate ==
Argo was sold on 11 January 1816 for £2,600.
