= Arran (1799 ship) =

India-built UK merchant ship 1799–1809

History

Great Britain
- Name: Arran
- Namesake: Isle of Arran
- Owner: Foreman & Co., Calcutta or Fairlie, Gilmore & Co.
- Builder: J. Gilmore, Calcutta
- Launched: 28 February 1799
- Fate: Wrecked June 1809
- Notes: Teak-built

General characteristics
- Tons burthen: 335 or 344, or 350, (bm) (Note: Hackman gives a burthen of 735 tons, but this must be a mis-transcription or typographical error as no other references come even close to half that dimension.)
- Sail plan: Full-rigged ship
- Armament: 6 × 4-pounder guns & 2 × 9-pounder guns "of the New Construction"

Arran was launched at Calcutta in 1799. In 1800, she sailed to Britain for the British East India Company (EIC). On her return voyage, she suffered a major outbreak of illness while between England and the Cape. She then traded between England and India and around India until she was lost in June 1809 while sailing to Basra from Bengal.

== Career ==
Arran was a "country ship" that performed one voyage for the EIC, sailing from Bengal to London. (Note: Country ships were vessels sailing out of India but not sailing west of the Cape of Good Hope. They thus did not infringe the EIC's monopoly on the trade between India or China and the UK.)

Captain John Barker sailed from Calcutta on 28 January 1800, bound for London. Arran was at Kedgeree on 11 March. She reached St Helena on 19 June, and arrived at Deptford on 17 September. There was a disturbance aboard Arran on 27 July among the lascars, but as of December 2022, details are only accessible via archival research.

Arran had a crew of 12 Europeans and 40 lascars and lost only three men on the way to England. The voyage back to Bengal was, however, marked by a much higher mortality rate. She left Portsmouth on 7 December 1800, having taken on 49 native passengers. The first death occurred on 17 December. By the time she reached the Cape, 35 had died and 24 were sick, six of whom died at the hospital there. She sailed from the Cape on 15 March 1781, and arrived in Bengal on 25 May. She had no further deaths after leaving the Cape, and the men who had been sick but had survived all recovered.

Exeter and Mornington also left England at the same time as Arran, and also suffered great mortality among their lascars on the voyage to India.

Arran appears in Lloyd's Register in 1800 with J. Barker, master, Foreman, owner, and trade London–India. The cost of outfitting Arran in London on 25 October 1800 was £2442 3d.

On 9 March 1801, Arran was at the Cape of Good Hope, about to sail for Calcutta. On 4 February 1802 Arran was at St Helena and expected to sail for England in company with Suffolk, which too was returning England from the Indies.

The costs of outfitting on 15 July 1802 were £2895 9s. Arran was admitted to the Registry of Great Britain on 2 July 1802.

Arran continued to trade with India. On 23 April 1805 Arran, William Robb, master, anchored off Calcutta. She had left Madras on the 15th.

Arran appears in the Register of Shipping for 1809 with Wilson, master, Scott & Co., owner, and trade London–India.

== Fate ==
Arran was wrecked in June 1809 on the island of Karak (29°15′N 50°19.5′E) in the Persian Gulf. By one report she was on a voyage from Bengal to Bussorah, Ottoman Iraq. The cargo was expected to be saved.

According to another report, she had sailed from Bussorah and was on her way through the gulf when she stranded on Karak. Captain Wilson paid well for local assistance in removing her cargo and stores. Her cargo consisted of horses, copper, drugs, and a large amount of treasure. All the treasure had been saved and at the time of the report it was expected that the rest of the cargo would be also. Arran had sailed in company with the EIC's cruizer HCS Nautilus, which remained with her after Arran grounded to protect her cargo and the ship's company. (Note: Nautilus was a brig of 185 tons (bm) and 14 guns, launched by the Bombay Dockyard in 1806 for the Bombay Marine, the EIC's naval arm.)
