= Herculean (1799 ship) =

History

Great Britain
- Name: Herculean
- Owner: Robert Anderson
- Builder: Simon Temple, Temple shipbuilders, South Shields
- Launched: 21 September 1799
- Fate: Foundered 23 August 1806

General characteristics
- Tons burthen: 608, 60861/94, or 637, or 644 (bm)
- Length: 121 ft 3 1/2 in (37.0 m) (overall); 95 ft 10 in (29.2 m) (keel)
- Beam: 34 ft 6 1/2 in (10.5 m)
- Depth of hold: 13 ft 4 in (4.1 m)
- Propulsion: Sail
- Complement: 54
- Armament: 1800:14 × 9-pounder guns; 1806:6 × 9-pounder guns + 6 × 18-pounder carronades
- Notes: Three decks

Herculean was launched in 1799 at Shields. She made two voyages as an "extra ship", under charter to the British East India Company (EIC). She then became a West Indiaman and foundered in 1806.

== Career ==
Herculean was a three-deck ship, and copper-fastened. At the time of her launch she was the largest merchant ship ever built on the Tyne.

On 7 March 1800, the Court of Directors of the EIC met at India house and hired five vessels for one voyage each to bring back from Bengal "sugar, cotton, saltpeter, etc." Her builder (owner), was Lyatt & Co.

EIC voyage #1 (1800–1801): Captain John Robinson Franklin acquired a letter of marque on 6 May 1800. He sailed from Portsmouth on 28 June 1800, bound for Bengal. Herculean was part of a convoy of eight vessels under the escort of the frigate HMS Active.

Herculean arrived at Calcutta on 19 January 1801. Outward bound, she was at Kedgeree on 10 March, and reached Bencoolen on 7 May. Homeward bound, she reached St Helena on 27 August and arrived at the Downs on 31 October.

Herculean underwent repairs in 1802.

EIC voyage #2 (1802–1804): Captain Samuel Butler sailed from the Downs on 4 May 1802, bound for Bombay and Bengal. Herculean reached Bombay on 6 September.

Richard Wellesley, the Governor General of India, then sent Herculean to the Concan to embark His Highness the Peishwa (of Poonah), and carry him to Bassein. Herculean sailed to Severndroog, where the Peishwa had taken refuge. She stopped for a few days at an intermediary port where the Peishwa landed for a few days, and then carried him to Bassein, where she delivered him on 16 December. Herculean then returned to Bombay, where she arrived on 31 December.

Herculean arrived at Calcutta on 2 April 1803. Outward bound from Calcutta, she was at Kedgeree on 17 June, and reached Poolo Bay (about nine miles south of Fort Marlborough) on 28 September. She was carrying 3000 bags of paddy (unmilled rice), for Fort Marlborough.

Homeward bound, she reached St Helena on 17 January 1804 and arrived at the Downs on 28 April.

Robert Anderson sold Herculean to John Lyall in 1803. Both Lloyd's Register and the Register of Shipping (RS) for 1804 show J. Lyall as owner. The RS for 1806 shows her master as J.Proctor, and her trade as London–Jamaica.

== Fate ==
Herculean foundered on 23 August 1806 in a gale on her homeward passage from Jamaica to London. Herculean was one of 13 vessels of the Jamaica Fleet that were sunk in the August 1806 Great Coastal hurricane. Of the 109 vessels, by October five vessels of the 109 in the convoy were still unaccounted for, though only the 13 were known to have sunk. On the vessels known to have been lost, 70 crew drowned, including 3 men from Herculean; 22 of her crew were saved. (Other vessels lost included Nutwell and Exeter.)
