= Eliza Ann (1795 ship) =

History

Great Britain
- Name: Eliza Ann, or Eliza and Ann
- Owner: Lennox & Co.
- Builder: Edwards, Gillett & Larkins, Calcutta
- Launched: 17 July 1795
- Fate: Lost in 1807

General characteristics
- Tons burthen: 459, or 500(bm)
- Propulsion: Sail
- Armament: 12 × 6-pounder guns
- Notes: Teak

Eliza Ann (or Eliza and Ann) was launched at Calcutta in 1795. She sailed to England where she was admitted to the Registry. In all, she made five voyages for the British East India Company (EIC), during one of which she participated in a notable action and during the last of which she captured a French privateer. She herself was lost in 1807.

== Career ==
=== EIC voyage #1 (1795–1796) ===
Captain John Lloyd sailed from Calcutta on 4 September 1795. Eliza Ann sailed to Madras, which she reached on 28 September, but then returned to Calcutta on 13 November.

There she loaded rice on behalf of the British government, which was importing grain to address high prices for wheat in Britain following a poor harvest.

Bound for England, Eliza Ann was at Saugor on 25 January 1796, reached St Helena on 11 April, and arrived at Long Reach on 8 July.

Eliza Ann was admitted to the Registry of Great Britain on 31 August. She entered Lloyd's Register in 1796 with R. Hughes, master, J.Sweeder, owner, and trade London–India.

=== EIC voyage #2 (1796–1799) ===
Captain Robert Hughes sailed from The Downs on 5 October 1796, bound for Madras and Bengal. Eliza Ann arrived at Madras on 25 February 1797. From there she sailed to Colombo, where she arrived on 18 March, Cochin (10 April), and Telicherry (19 April). She returned to Madras on 6 May, was at Trincomalee on 12 June, and returned to Madras on 31 July. She then sailed to Pondicherry, where she arrived on 14 August, before returning to Madras on 17 August.

The British government chartered Eliza Ann to serve as a transport, one of about 15, in a planned attack on Manila. She sailed to Penang, where she arrived on 5 September, where she joined the other vessels. However, the British Government cancelled the invasion following a peace treaty with Spain and the EIC released the vessels it had engaged.

ELiza Ann then returned for the last time to Madras on 11 December. On 4 January 1798 Eliza Ann was at Trincomalee again, and on 19 January Colombo. She arrived at Calcutta on 16 March. Finally homeward bound, she was at Kedgeree on 30 April and the Cape of Good Hope on 2 September. She reached St Helena on 17 November and arrived at the Downs on 3 February 1799.

On 31 May 1799 Eliza Ann paid £3661 2s 3d for outfitting for her return voyage to Bengal. The amount included all tradesmen's bills, including provisions, but no wages.

=== Action with Confiance ===
On 28 May Britannia, Captain Edward Hanoner Palmer, sailed from London for Madras. On 24 September she left the Cape in company with the American armed East Indiaman Atlantic, Captain Waters. The two planned on sailing together as far as "Achun Head" (Aceh). On 8 October a ship came into sight and appeared to be chasing them, but they separated and both escaped.

Then on 13 November Atlantic encountered Eliza Ann, Captain John Barker, just north of the Equator (approx. 00°00′N 95°30′E). Barker reported that he was short of supplies, and that he had only three officers and seven men capable of working the ship, having lost almost 40 men, and the rest being debilitated by scurvy. He also had 17 cadets aboard that the EIC was training. Waters shared his supplies with Barker and agreed to remain in company on the way to Bengal.

On 11 December, or 25 December, Atlantic and Eliza Ann were off the "Anacan" River (Arracan, so probably the Kaladan River), or the Sandheads when they encountered a strange vessel. As the vessel bore down on them, Atlantic and Eliza Ann prepared for action. The action commenced around 5p.m. and broke off around nightfall. Both sides repaired damaged rigging. Then next morning about 7:15 a.m. the action recommenced, though Eliza Ann was almost out of shot. Atlantic was able to out-maneuvered the French vessel, foiling her attempt to come alongside and board. Atlantic then delivered two broadsides, accompanied by small-arms fire. At 8:45 a.m., the French privateer sailed rapidly away. Atlantic had sustained damage, but no serious casualties. Atlantic arrived at Calcutta on 29 December.

The privateer turned out to have been Confiance. (Note: On 7 October 1800, Confiance, under the command of Robert Surcouf, captured the East Indiaman Kent. In 1803 the British Royal Navy captured Confiance and took her into service as HMS Confiance.)

Many of the crew on Eliza Ann were lascars, who had a reputation for being reluctant to fight for the EIC. However, on this occasion they fought well. The EIC awarded money to the ships' companies. It also gave Barker and Waters gold cups as an expression of its appreciation for their leadership.

=== EIC voyage #3 (1800) ===
Captain G.G. Richardson sailed from Calcutta on 29 March 1800. Eliza Ann was at Saugor on 3 March, reached St Helena on 18 June, and arrived at the Downs on 9 September.

On 28 November 1800 Eliza Ann paid £3749 14s 1d for outfitting for her return voyage to Bengal.

On 14 January 1801 HMS Argo was off Ferrol serving as escort for Mornington, Exeter, and Eliza Ann, which were bound for India, and a whaler. They encountered a small Spanish ship that Argo captured.

=== EIC voyage #4 (1801–1802) ===
Captain John Parsons sailed from Calcutta on 19 July 1801. Eliza Ann was at Culpee on 22 August, reached St Helena on 17 December, and arrived at the Downs on 9 February 1802.

On 22 September 1802 Eliza Ann paid £3864 for outfitting for her return voyage to Bengal.

=== EIC voyage #5 (1803–1804) ===
Captain Mungo Gilmore sailed from Calcutta on 31 December 1803. Eliza Ann was at Saugor on 3 February 1804, and reached St Helena on 28 June.

Eliza Ann sailed from St Helena on 9 July in company with the EIC "extra" ships Sir William Pulteney and Union. Gilmore was the senior captain and Governor Colonel Robert Patton (of St Helena), had appointed him to command the group. At daylight on 22 August, the Indiamen sighted a French privateer brig that sailed towards them and engaged Union, which was the leading ship. The engagement lasted about 20 minutes and the French vessel surrendered at 48°5′N 13°0′W after Eliza Ann and Sir William Pulteney came up. The privateer was Venus, and she was armed with sixteen 4, 8, & 12-pounder guns. She had a crew of 73 men (of whom five were away on prizes), under the command of Lieutenant Pierre Henri Nicholas Benamy of the French Navy. In the engagement Venus had lost one man killed and had two men seriously wounded. She also had on board five men from a prize crew that HMS Wasp had put on a Spanish vessel that Venus had recaptured. The next evening, west of Scilly, Venus parted from the Indiamen and headed for a British port; the French prisoners remained with the Indiamen.

Eliza Ann arrived at the Downs on 2 September. Venus arrived at Deal on 24 September. French sources simply refer to her as "privateer from Nantes known to have been active in October 1804".

On 31 December 1806 Eliza Ann paid £3398 13s 2d for outfitting for a return voyage to Bengal.

== Fate ==
Eliza Ann was lost in 1807. An Eliza Ann was wrecked on Hainan with some loss of life in 1807. The year and location are consistent with the two vessels being the same, but there are no other corroborating details. One source reports that Eliza Ann, of 500 tons and belonging to Calcutta, was lost in 1806.
