= Travers (1800 ship) =

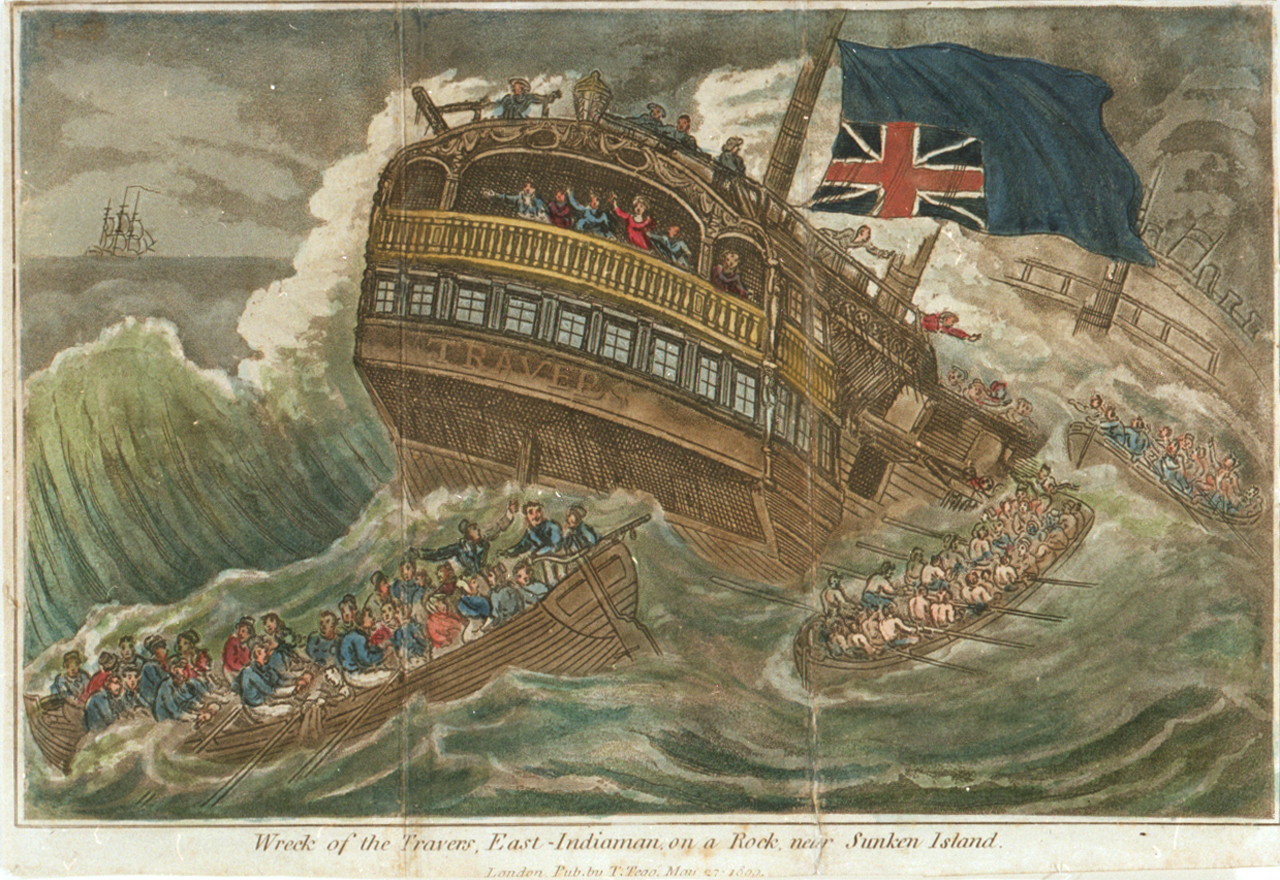
- Wreck of the Travers, East-Indiaman, on a Rock near Sunken Island, Thomas Tegg, 27 May 1809

History

Great Britain
- Name: Travers
- Owner: John Mangles
- Builder: Perry, Wells & Green, Blackwall
- Launched: 10 April 1800
- Fate: Wrecked 7 November 1808

General characteristics
- Tons burthen: 576, or 577, or 61169/94, or 614 (bm)
- Length: Overall:129 ft 5 1/2 in (39.5 m); Keel:105 ft 1 1/4 in (32.0 m)
- Beam: 32 ft 1 1/2 in (9.8 m)
- Depth of hold: 13 ft 0 in (4.0 m)
- Complement: 1800:50; 1803:52; 1806:54
- Armament: 1800:12 × 6-pounder guns; 1803:12 × 6-pounder guns; 1806:12 × 12-pounder carronades
- Notes: Three decks

Travers was launched in 1800 as an East Indiaman. She made four complete voyages as an "extra ship" for the British East India Company (EIC). She was wrecked near the end of the outward-bound leg of her fifth voyage.

== Career ==
EIC voyage #1 (1800-1802): Captain Thomas Sanders acquired a letter of marque on 19 April 1800. He sailed from Portsmouth on 28 June 1800, bound for Bengal and Bombay. Travers reached Calcutta on 8 January 1801. She left Bengal on 20 March and reached Anjengo on 24 April and arrived at Bombay on 7 May. She left Bombay on 19 August, reached St Helena on 8 November and arrived at The Downs on 19 July 1802.

The "United Company of Merchants of England trading to the East Indies" offered 28,966 bags of rice for sale on 25 March. The rice had come in on Travers, Melville Castle, Skelton Castle, and Mornington.

EIC voyage #2 (1802-1803): Captain Sanders sailed from The Downs on 17 June 1802, bound for the Cape of Good Hope, Ceylon, and Bombay. Travers was at the Cape on 31 August, reached Colombo on 2 November, and arrived at Bombay on 25 November. On 30 January 1803 she was at Surat, before returning to Bombay on 8 February. Homeward bound, she was at Tellicherry on 3 April, Calicut on 7 April, and Quilon on 11 April. She reached St Helena on 22 July and arrived at The Downs on 22 September.

EIC voyage #3 (1804-1806): War with France had resumed while Travers was returning from her previous voyage. Captain Sanders acquired a letter of marque on 29 June 1803. He sailed from Portsmouth on 4 September 1804, bound for St Helena and Bengal. Travers reached St Helena on 23 December and sailed from it on 7 February 1805. She arrived at Diamond Harbour on 28 April. Homeward bound, she left Bengal on 16 July and reached Bencoolen on 27 September. She left Bencoolen on 18 November, reached St Helena on 25 January 1806, and arrived at The Downs on 14 June.

EIC voyage #4 (1807-1808): Captain John Collins acquired a letter of marque on 8 October 1806. He sailed from Portsmouth on 4 January 1807, bound for Bombay. Travers arrived at Bombay on 26 May. She left on 3 August, reached the Cape on 1 October, and arrived at The Downs on 24 January 1808.

== Fate ==
Captain Collins sailed from Portsmouth on 10 June 1808, bound for Madras and Bengal. Travers reached Madeira on 24 June.

Near the equator Travers captured Jenny, of Hamburg. Jenny was sailing from Buenos Aires to Tonnengen, and Travers sent her into the Cape. There she was condemned in prize and valued at £1000.

Travers wrecked on a rock in the Bay of Bengal on 7 November. The location (15°38′N 94°20′E), was north of the Andaman Islands and just south of what is now Burma. It was about three miles from Diamond Island, and about a mile and a half from Sunken Rock.

The Indiamen Earl Spencer and Monarch were in company but some way off and sailed on. The passengers and most of the crew took to Travers's boats. There were 93 people in the launch, 18 in the cutter, and eight in the jolly boat. Though the jolly boat was crowded, Collins sent her back to the wreck to attempt to retrieve those crewmen who had remained behind, unwilling to leave their possessions. The boat was able to retrieve three; however, six Europeans, seven Chinese, and three lascars refused to leave and stayed on the wreck. Earl Spencer and Monarch were out of sight, but Collins steered his boats in the direction they had sailed and after some hours was able to catch them up. Earl Spencer took all the survivors on board. The situation of those left behind on Travers was not considered desperate as she was close to Diamond Island and later vessels were sent to their relief. Still, they were presumed to have drowned.)

Travers was carrying some treasure, 500 pipes of Madeira, and other cargo; the value of the loss was estimated at £150,000. The EIC put the value of the cargo it lost at £6,568.
