= Exeter (1793 ship) =

History

Great Britain
- Name: Exeter
- Owner: 1796:R. Whitford; 1801: A. Dunlop; 1802:Colvins & Bajett; 1806: W.Christie
- Builder: George Foreman & Nathaniel Bacon, Calcutta
- Launched: 26 December 1793
- Fate: Sank 21 August 1806
- Notes: Teak-built

General characteristics
- Tons burthen: 500, or 503, or 600 (bm)
- Propulsion: Sail
- Complement: 1800:20; 1806:22
- Armament: 1800:6 × 4-pounder guns; 1801:6 × 6-pounder guns; 1806:6 × 3&9-pounder guns + 2 × 18-pounder carronades

Exeter was launched at Calcutta in 1793. She made three voyages from Calcutta to England for the British East India Company (EIC). On the way home from england on the second of these voyages she suffered a high mortality rate from disease among her non-European crew. She was lost in August 1806 in a hurricane while returning to London from Jamaica.

== Career ==
EIC voyage #1 (1796-1798): Captain Richard Whitford was at Calcutta on 27 January 1796 to sail for England. On 24 February Exeter was at Saugor and by 30 July she was at St Augustine's Bay, Madagascar. Three weeks later, on 20 September, she was at Bombay. The reason for the return to India was that she had sustained damages and had to put back for repairs. Whitford had to enter into several bottomry bonds to finance the repairs. When he eventually could not repay them the case went to court to determine the order of priority of the claims.

From Bombay Exeter sailed to Trincomalee, arriving on 27 March 1797. England-bound, she was at the Cape of Good Hope on 19 October, St Helena on 10 December, and the Downs on 30 January 1798.

Exeter was admitted to the Registry of Great Britain on 23 July 1798.

EIC voyage #2 (1800): Captain Anthony Dunlop left Calcutta on 1 February 1800. Exeter was at Kedgeree on 8 March and St Helena on 17 June. She arrived at the Downs on 6 September. She had suffered eight crew deaths on her this leg of her voyage.

Dunlop acquired a letter of marque on 26 November 1800. Two days later he paid a bill for repairs of £2979 11s 11d.

Exeter sailed from Gravesend, Kent on 7 December, and Portsmouth on 17 December. Her crew consisted of 25 Europeans and 53 lascars.

On 14 January 1801 HMS Argo was off Ferrol serving as escort for Mornington, Eliza Ann, and Exeter, which were bound for India, and a whaler. They encountered a small Spanish ship that Argo captured.

Deaths among the crew on Exeter did not commence immediately, but by the time she arrived at Bombay, 24 crew members had died. The deaths were entirely among the lascars. The men still ill when she arrived at Bombay soon recovered.

Exeter had left England at the same time as Arran and Mornington, both of which suffered similar mortality rates.

EIC voyage #3 (1801-1802): Captain John McIntosh left Calcutta on 1 July 1801. Exeter was at Kedgeree on 1 September and St Helena on 6 January 1802. She arrived at the Downs on 1 March.

The New Oriental Register... reported in 1802 that her master was Captain John Parsons, and her owner Colvins & Bajett.

== Fate ==
The Register of Shipping for 1806 listed Exeter, A. Smillie, master, as sailing between London and Jamaica.

Exeter was one of 13 vessels of the Jamaica Fleet that were sunk in the August 1806 Great Coastal hurricane. Of the 109 vessels, by October five vessels of the 109 in the convoy were still unaccounted for, though only the 13 were known to have sunk. On the vessels known to have been lost, 70 crew drowned, including 22 men from Exeter; two of her crew were saved. Lloyd's List reported that Exeter, A. Smellie, master, had been lost on 21 August. (Other vessels lost included Nutwell and Herculean.)

There is one report that Exeter foundered in the South China Sea, but there is no other evidence to support that report, and a great deal of evidence in support of the loss on 21 August on her return journey from Jamaica to London.
