= Sir John Borlase Warren (1800 ship) =

History

Great Britain
- Name: Sir John Borlase Warren
- Namesake: Admiral Sir John Borlase Warren
- Builder: Thomas Kenwill, Plymouth,
- Launched: 6 October 1800
- Fate: Abandoned sinking in 1815

General characteristics
- Tons burthen: 36030/94, or 364, or 369, or 420 (bm)
- Propulsion: Sail
- Armament: 1803:12 × 18-pounder carronades; 1809:12 × 6-pounder guns; 1812:8 × 18-pounder carronades; 1814:2 × 6-pounder guns + 5 × 18-pounder carronades

Sir John Borlase Warren (henceforth Sir John), was launched in 1800. She traded with the West Indies after having made one voyage for the British East India Company (EIC). A French privateer captured her in 1808 though she was immediately recaptured. Her crew abandoned her in 1812 but she was recovered. She foundered in 1815.

== Career ==
Sir John appeared in the 1801 Register of Shipping with W. Neil, master, Noble & Co., owners, and trade Plymouth–India. Messrs Princip & Saunders tendered her to the EIC to bring back rice from Bengal. She was one of 28 vessels that sailed on that mission between December 1800 and February 1801.

Captain William James Davis sailed on 28 December 1800 for Bengal. Sir John was at Falmouth on 24 January 1801 and arrived at Calcutta on 29 May. Homeward bound, she was at Saugor on 13 September, and reached the Cape of Good Hope on 30 December and St Helena on 28 January 1802. Sir John Borlase Warren left St Helena on 31 January 1802, in company with Nutwell. Sir John arrived at The Downs on 11 April.

The data below is from Lloyd's Register.

| Year | Master | Owner | Trade |
|---|---|---|---|
| 1803 | J. Lee | Noble & Co. | London–Barbados |
| 1804 | J.Lee; R. Hunt | Noble & Co. | London–Barbados |
| 1805 | R. Hunt | Noble & Co. | London-Demerara |
| 1806 | R. Hunt | Noble & Co. | London-Demerara |
| 1807 | R. Hunt | Noble & Co. | London-Demerara |
| 1808 | R. Hunt | Noble & Co. | London-Demerara |

What Lloyd's Register did not record was that in 1805–1806, Sir John was one of the transport vessels that were part of the expedition under General Sir David Baird and Admiral Sir Home Riggs Popham that would in 1806 capture the Dutch Cape Colony.

Sir John sailed in March 1806 as one of seven cartel ships repatriating to Holland the Dutch troops captured at the Cape, and their dependents.

On 12 September 1808 a French privateer captured Sir John as Sir John was sailing from Haiti to Bermuda with troops. The British recaptured Sir John the same day.

The data below is from the Register of Shipping from 1810 on. Lloyd's Register apparently did not list Sir John after 1809. The data is only as accurate as owners cared to keep it.

| Year | Master | Owner | Trade |
|---|---|---|---|
| 1809 | R. Hunt | Noble & Co. | London-Demerara |
| 1810 | R. Hunt | Noble & Co. | London-Demerara |
| 1811 | R. Hunt | Noble & Co. | London transport |
| 1812 | R. Hunt | Noble & Co. | London transport |
| 1813 | R. Hunt | Noble & Co. | London transport |

On 2 September 1812 her crew abandoned Sir John in position 28°00′N 68°20′W. Lloyd's List listed her master as Jowell, and described her as being a wreck. However, she was picked up, towed in, and repaired.

| Year | Master | Owner | Trade |
|---|---|---|---|
| 1814 | P. Baird | Noble & Co. | London transport |
| 1815 | P. Baird | Noble & Co. | London transport |
| 1816 | P. Baird | Noble & Co. | London transport |

== Loss ==
On 22 October 1815 Sir John, Ancell, master, was in position 29°N 69°W. She was sailing from Savannah, Georgia, to Barbados when her crew abandoned her as she had six feet of water in her hold. The crew arrived at Jamaica.

The Register of Shipping listed Sir John with unchanging, stale data for at least six years after her loss, while showing her last survey as taking place in 1814.
