= Phoenix (1798 ship) =

History

Great Britain
- Name: Phoenix
- Namesake: Phoenix
- Owner: 1798:Hibbert & Co. (Note: Hackman states Randall & Brent built Phoenix for J. Dawson & Co. However, entries in Lloyd's Register for 1799 and 1800 confirm Hibbert & Co.); 1820:Dawson & Co.
- Builder: Randall & Brent, Rotherhithe
- Launched: 27 September 1798
- Fate: Broken up 1837

General characteristics
- Tons burthen: 589, or 58989/94, or 610 (bm)
- Crew: 70
- Armament: 1804:20 × 18-pounder guns; 1805:2 × 12-pounder + 6 × 9-pounder guns; 1810:20 × 18-pounder + 2 × 18-pounder guns; 1815:20 × 18-pounder + 2 × 18-pounder guns

Phoenix was a three-decker merchant ship built on the Thames in 1798. On a voyage in 1824 on which she first transported convicts to Van Diemen's Land she was damaged on the Sow and Pigs Reef inside Port Jackson Heads, New South Wales, Australia. She was then condemned and turned into a prison hulk. She was broken up in 1837.

== Career ==
Phoenix was launched in 1798 for Hibbert & Co., who were replacing an earlier Phoenix that they had just sold. Lloyd's Register for 1799 gives the name of the master of the new Phoenix as "Stimpson", and her trade as London-Jamaica, like that of her predecessor in 1790.

On 1 December 1804, Captain John Graham received a letter of marque.

Year	Master	Owner	Trade	Notes
1800	Stimpson	Hibbert	London-Jamaica	600 tons (bm)
1805	J. Douglas	Hibbert	London-Jamaica	586 tons (bm)
1810	J. Taylor	Stimson	London-Jamaica	584 tons (bm)
1815	J. Taylor	Turner	London-Jamaica	600 tons (bm);
1820		Dawsons	London-India	616 tons (bm)

== Final voyage ==
Phoenix, under the command of Captain Robert White and with surgeon Charles Quaede, left England on 29 March 1824, and arrived in Hobart, Tasmania, on 21 July 1824. She was transporting 204 male convicts, and landed 202, two having died during the voyage. From Hobart Phoenix sailed to Sydney.

Phoenix picked up a pilot just outside Sydney Heads but on entering the harbour struck the Sow and Pigs Reef. HMS Tamar helped refloat Phoenix, but inspection determined that Phoenix's keel was so damaged that she could not be repaired in New South Wales.

== Prison hulk ==
The New South Wales Colonial Government bought Phoenix for £1000 and converted her to a prison hulk for convicts awaiting transportation to Norfolk Island and Moreton Bay. She thereby became Australia's first prison hulk.

She was moored in Hulk Bay (now Lavender Bay). She was considered a much better place to be imprisoned than on shore; contemporary reports described her as cleanly wholesome and ...spacious. She could hold up to 200 prisoners. However, by 1837 Phoenix was in a "sinking state"; the government therefore grounded and auctioned her off. for £145. Her prisoners were temporarily housed on Goat Island.

== Fate ==
Thomas Hyndes broke her up in Cockle Bay in December 1837.
