= Ceres (1794 ship) =

Ship launched at Whitby, North Yorkshire, England

History

Great Britain
- Name: Ceres
- Namesake: Ceres - the Roman goddess of agriculture
- Owner: 1795: Leighton; 1804: T. Hall & Co.
- Builder: Thomas Fishburn, Whitby
- Launched: 11 March 1794; 231 years ago
- Fate: Last listed in 1816

General characteristics
- Tons burthen: 44247/94 or 455 (bm)
- Propulsion: Sail
- Complement: 25 men
- Armament: 1795: 10 × 6-pounder guns; 1800: 10 × 6&4-pounder guns

Ceres was launched at Whitby, North Yorkshire, England, in 1794. She made two voyages for the British East India Company (EIC). Thereafter she remained a London-based transport. She was last listed in 1816.

== Career ==
Ceres enters Lloyd's Register in 1795 with T. Hedley, master, Leighton, owner, and trade London—Botany Bay.

EIC voyage #1 (1795–1797): Captain Thomas Hedley sailed from Portsmouth on 9 August 1795, bound for New South Wales and China. Ceres reached Rio de Janeiro on 18 October and left on 22 October. On her way Ceres stopped at Île Amsterdam. There she rescued two English and two French sailors, (the leader being Pierre François Péron), who had been marooned there three years earlier. The French brig Emélie had left them there to gather seal skins. (This was after the outbreak of war between Britain and France, something of which Emélie was unaware.) HMS Lion captured Emélie before she could retrieve them. Hedley rescued the men, but left the skins behind.

Ceres arrived at Sydney Cove on 24 January 1796 with her cargo of provisions. On 24 January 1796, the American vessel Otter, Captain Ebenezer Dorr, arrived from Île Amsterdam with a cargo of skins that he had found there. When Péron found out about this, he took Hadley with him as witness and met with Dorr to lay claim to the skins. Péron and Dorr came to an agreement that included Péron joining Otter as First Mate, and sailing with her until she would reach China. There they would sell the skins and divide the proceeds.

Ceres left on 3 April, bound for China. Ceres arrived at Whampoa Anchorage on 12 May. Homeward bound, she crossed the Second Bar, reached St Helena on 20 November, and arrived at Long Reach on 14 February 1797.

There is a report that on 21 November 1797 Ceres sighted the island of Sonsorol while sailing from Port Jackson to China. Unfortunately, readily available online resources can provide no more information about what would represent Hedley and Ceres's second voyage to the region.

EIC voyage #2 (1801–1802): Captain Thomas Todd (or Toad) received a letter of marque on 3 December 1800. Thomas Hall tendered Ceres to the EIC to bring back rice from Bengal. She was one of 28 vessels that sailed on that mission between December 1800 and February 1801.

Todd sailed from Falmouth on 10 January 1801, bound for Bengal. Ceres reached Calcutta on 16 June. Homeward bound, she was at Culpee on 21 August, Saugor on 15 September, and St Helena on 31 December. She reached Deptford on 6 March 1802. On 30 March 1802 the Court of Directors of the United Company of Merchants trading with the East Indies (the EIC), announced that on 22 April they would offer for sale 37,000 bags of rice brought by the Hind, Hope, Minerva, Ceres, and Bellona.

The data in the table below comes from either Lloyd's Register (LR), or the Register of Shipping (RS). Either source is only as accurate and complete as a vessel's owner choose to keep it. Thus gaps in coverage and contradictions occur in the data.

Year	Master	Owner	Trade	Source
1804	Richardson	T. Hall	London—Amsterdam	RS
1805	T. Headley	Leighton	London—Botany Bay	LR
1806	Richardson; Wallow	Hall	Cork	LR
1807	J. Wallow	T. Hall	Cork transport	LR
1810	Jenkins	T. Hall	London transport	LR
1815	Jenkins	T. Hall	London transport	LR
1816	Jenkins	T. Hall	London transport	LR
