= Minerva (1786 EIC ship) =

History

Great Britain
- Name: Minerva
- Owner: EIC voyages 1–4:Jeremiah Royds; EIC voyages 5-6:John Atkins
- Builder: Perry, Blackwall
- Launched: November 1786
- Fate: Last listed 1805

General characteristics
- Tons burthen: 780, 798, 79823/94, or 799 (bm)
- Length: Overall:143 ft 7 in (43.8 m); Keel:116 ft 4 in (35.5 m)
- Beam: 35 ft 11 in (10.9 m)
- Depth of hold: 14 ft 9 in (4.5 m)
- Complement: 1793:110; 1800:50
- Armament: 1793:26 × 12&6-pounder guns; 1800:20 × 9&6-pounder guns

Minerva was launched as an East Indiaman in 1786. She made seven voyages for the British East India Company (EIC), and one carrying rice from Bengal for the British government. She is last listed in 1805 but with stale data from 1802.

== Career ==
=== EIC voyage #1 (1787–1789) ===
Captain Robert Fairfull sailed from Portsmouth on 1 April 1787 bound for Madras and Bengal. Minerva reached Johanna on 6 July and Madras 30 July, and arrived at Diamond Harbour on 13 August. She was at Cox's Island on 15 December and Madras on 27 December. She returned to Bengal, at Ingelli on 26 January 1788. She sailed to Madras, where she arrived on 4 March, and then on to Bombay, where she arrived on 12 April. From Bombay she sailed to China, stopping first at Penang on 24 June. She arrived at Whampoa Anchorage on 1 August. Homeward bound, she crossed the Second Bar on 26 November, reached St Helena on 4 March 1789, and arrived at the Downs on 6 May.

=== EIC voyage #2 (1790–1791) ===
Captain Fairfull sailed from Portsmouth on 5 January 1790, bound for China. Minerva reached Madras on 2 May and Penang on 27 June. She arrived at Whampoa on 5 August. Homeward bound, she crossed the Second Bar on 14 November, reached the Cape on 9 April 1791 and St Helena on 28 April, and arrived at the Downs on 27 June.

=== EIC voyage #3 (1793–1794) ===
War with France had broken out shortly before Minerva was to sail on her next voyage. Captain Kennard Smith acquired a letter of marque on 7 March 1793. he sailed from Portsmouth on 5 April 1793. Minerva arrived at Whampoa on 10 September. Homeward bound, she crossed the Second Bar on 18 November, reached St Helena on 11 April 1794 and Galway on 20 July, and arrived at the Downs on 26 August.

=== EIC voyage #4 (1795–1796) ===
Captain Smith sailed from the Downs on 24 May 1795, bound for Madras and Bengal. Minerva reached Madras on 2 September and arrived at Diamond Harbour on 5 October. Homeward bound, she was at Cox's Island on 4 December, Madras on 6 January 1796, and the Cape on 26 April. She reached St Helena on 30 May and arrived at the Downs on 3 August.

=== EIC voyage #5 (1797–1798) ===
Captain Smith sailed from Portsmouth on 6 April 1797, bound for Madras and Bengal. Minerva reached Madras on 27 July and Penang on 12 October, and arrived at Diamond Harbour on 25 November. Homeward bound she was at Saugor on 28 February, Colombo on 1 April, and the Cape on 22 June. She reached St Helena on 5 August, and arrived at Long Reach on 22 October.

=== EIC voyage #6 (1799–1800) ===
Captain Smith sailed from Portsmouth on 24 April 1799, bound for Madras and Bengal. Minerva reached Madras on 25 August and arrived at Diamond Harbour on 15 September. Homeward bound she was at Saugor on 7 December, the Cape on 27 April 1800, and St Helena on 9 June. She arrived at the Downs on 23 September.

On one of the above voyages, Captain Smith suppressed a mutiny. He had had a man seized for punishment at the gangway. Some members of Minerva's crew rushed to cut the man down and rescue him. Smith drew his sword and severely wounded the ringleader. This ended the mutiny and the punishment was carried out.

=== EIC voyage #7 (1801–1802) ===
John Atkins tendered Minerva to the EIC in December 1800 to bring rice back from Bengal for Britain. The tender was accepted and Captain George Richardson acquired a letter of marque on 16 December.

Minerva was one of 28 vessels that sailed on that mission between December 1800 and February 1801.

Captain Richardson sailed from Portsmouth on 12 February 1801 and arrived at Diamond Harbour on 21 June. Minerva was at Calcutta on 5 July and Fultah on 18 August. She reached St Helena on 3 January 1802, and arrived at the Downs on 22 February.

On 30 March 1802 the Court of Directors of the United Company of Merchants trading with the East Indies (the EIC), announced that on 22 April they would offer for sale 37,000 bags of rice brought by Hind, Hope, Minerva, Ceres, and Bellona.

== Fate ==
One source states that Minerva was sent out to India in 1800 and sold to local buyers. That is clearly incorrect. Lloyd's Register continued to carry Minerva, Richards, master, J. Atkins, owner, trade London–India, until 1805. There is no supporting evidence that she continued to trade after her return to Britain in 1802.
