= Bellona (1782 ship) =

British marine vessel

History

Great Britain
- Name: Bellona
- Namesake: Bellona (goddess)
- Owner: Boyd & Co (1782–1802); Boyd & Co (1804–1811)
- Operator: East India Company (1782–1802)
- Builder: Woolcombe, Limehouse
- Launched: 1782
- Captured: 1810
- Fate: Scuttled after capture in 1810

General characteristics
- Tons burthen: 456, or 469, or 472, (bm)
- Length: Overall: 113 ft 5 1/2 in (34.6 m); Keel:90 ft 0 in (27.4 m)
- Beam: 30 ft 10 1/2 in (9.4 m)
- Depth of hold: 10 ft 6 in (3.2 m) (overall)
- Complement: 30
- Armament: 1796: 10 × 6-pounder guns; 1800: 10 × 6-pounder guns; 1805: 16 × 9-pounder carronades; 1811: 8 × 18-pounder carronades

Bellona was a three-decker merchantman launched in 1782, at Limehouse by Woolcombe for Boyd & Co. She then traded for a decade before, in 1792, commencing a series of four voyages for the British East India Company as an "extra ship", that is, on a charter contract. During the first of these voyages she transported convicts from Britain to New South Wales. French privateers captured her and the British Royal Navy recaptured her, the Royal Navy seized her once, and then finally a French privateer captured her in February 1810, and scuttled her.

== Career ==
=== EIC voyage #1 (1792-94) ===
Captain Matthew Boyd sailed from Gravesend, England, on 8 August 1792, bound for New South Wales and China. The government chartered Bellona for the voyage, paying £4 4s/ton (bm)/month. Bellona carried 17 female convicts, five free settlers and their families, and a cargo of stores. The free settlers were the first free settlers to come to Australia. Bellona reached Rio de Janeiro on 18 October, and arrived at Port Jackson, New South Wales on 16 January 1793. The stores were five pipes of port wine, some rum, and 3000 lbs of tobacco. Unfortunately, bad weather on the journey had spoilt a large part of the most useful articles.

After delivering convicts, settlers, and cargo, Bellona sailed for China on 19 February. On the way, in February–March, Matthew Boyd discovered a reef system near New Caledonia. The Bellona Reefs are named in honour of the ship. Bellona reached Penang on 16 May and Malacca on 23 June, and arrived at Whampoa on 22 July. She was at the Second Bar on 20 December. On 1 January 1794, five East Indiamen set out together, in order: Bombay Castle, Chesterfield, Brunswick, Minerva, and Bellona. Bellona reached St Helena 20 April 1794, and Galway on 20 July, and arrived at Long Reach on 30 August.

=== EIC voyage #2 (1795-96) ===
Captain William Ward Farrer left the Downs on 12 July 1795, bound for Bengal. Bellona arrived at Calcutta on 7 December. While he was underway, he was issued a letter of marque on 19 September 1796. This authorized him to take offensive action against the French or their allies, not just defensive.

On the return leg of her voyage, Bellona passed Saugor on 3 February 1796, reached the Cape on 18 April and St Helena on 5 May, and arrived at Long Reach on 8 August.

=== EIC voyage #3 (1796-98) ===
Captain William Ward Farrer sailed from the Downs on 3 October 1796, bound for Madras and Amboina. Bellona reached Madras on 12 February 1797, Trincomalee on 11 March, and Pondicherry on 21 March. She returned to Madras on 26 March, reached Malacca on 6 June, and arrived at Amboina on 19 August. She left Amboina on 1 January 1798, reached the Cape on 17 March, St Helena on 15 April, and Cork on 25 June. She arrived at Long Reach on 10 July.

=== Jamaica trader (1799-1800) ===
Lloyd's Register for 1799, gives the name of Bellona's owner as "Wddrbrn", her master as E. Lamb, and her trade as London-Jamaica.

Lloyd's List reported on 13 June 1800 that "the Bellona, Lamb, has been taken by two French privateers, after an engagement of two hours; since retaken and arrived at Jamaica." The recapture was the work of HMS Merlin, which captured the "English Ship Bellona, of Ten Guns, and Six Hundred Tons, from London, bound to Saint Lucie".

=== EIC voyage #4 (1801-02) ===
Next, her owners tendered Bellona to the EIC to bring back rice from Bengal. Bellona, Edward Lamb, master, was one of 28 vessels that sailed on that mission between December 1800 and February 1801.

Captain Edwin Lamb sailed from the Downs on 14 January 1801, bound for Madras and Calcutta. Bellona reached Madras on 17 June, and Calcutta on 24 June. Homeward bound, she passed Saugor on 8 September, reached St Helena on 1 January 1802, and arrived at Gravesend on 3 March. On 30 March 1802, the Court of Directors of the United Company of Merchants trading with the East Indies (the EIC), announced that on 22 April, they would offer for sale 37,000 bags of rice brought by Hind, Hope, Minerva, Ceres, and Bellona.

== Subsequent career ==
Lloyd's Register of 1802, gave her master as "Lamb", her owner as "Boyd & Co.", and her trade as London to India. This information continued unchanged through 1804. However, there are accounts that Boyd & Co. sold Bellona to foreign buyers in 1802, but repurchased her in 1804.

There may be a related explanation for a break in 1803. The Morning Post, of London, England, reported on 5 November 1803, that: "The Batavia, Jansen, and the Bellona, Lamb, from Batavia to Amsterdam, are captured by the Governor of St. Helena." Coming from Batavia, the two vessels may not have realized that war with France and her allies, including the Batavian Republic, had recommenced in May. This would have provided grounds for the seizure of the two vessels as they arrived at St Helena.

Lloyd's Register of 1805, gave the name of Bellona's master as "Lamb", her owner as "Boyd & Co.", and her trade as London transport.

Bellona was one of the transport vessels that were part of the expedition under General Sir David Baird and Admiral Sir Home Riggs Popham that would in 1806 capture the Dutch Cape Colony.

On 28 February, she and six other transports sailed as cartels, repatriating Dutch prisoners to Holland.

The Caledonian Mercury reported on 8 September 1806, that "The Bellona, transport, Lamb, has been on shore at Plymouth, and received damage."

== Fate ==
On 28 February 1810, the French privateer Invincible Napoleon captured Bellona, Ross, master, at 36°N 35°W as Bellona was sailing from London to Amelia Island, Florida. The French set their prize on fire, scuttling her; Invincible Napoleon carried the crew into Bordeaux.

The entry in Lloyd's Register from 1805, continued unchanged until Bellona was last listed in 1813. Bellona is last listed in the Register of Shipping for 1811.
