= Skelton Castle (1800 ship) =

History

Great Britain
- Name: Skelton Castle
- Namesake: Skelton Castle
- Owner: EIC voyage #1:Thomas Wilkinson; EIC voyages #2-4:Hans Busk
- Builder: Perry, Wells & Green, Blackwall
- Launched: 1 March 1800
- Fate: Foundered c. December 1806

General characteristics
- Tons burthen: 583, or 612, or 62346/94 (bm)
- Length: Overall:129 ft 6 1/2 in (39.5 m); Keel:105 ft 1 1/8 in (32.0 m)
- Beam: 32 ft 3 3/4 in (9.8 m)
- Depth of hold: 13 ft 0 1/2 in (4.0 m)
- Complement: 1804:50; 1806:40
- Armament: 1804:16 × 12-pounder carronades; 1806:16 × 12-pounder carronades
- Notes: Three decks

Skelton Castle was an East Indiaman launched in 1800. She made three complete voyages to India for the British East India Company (EIC). She disappeared without a trace in December 1806 while on the outward-bound leg of her fourth voyage.

== Career ==
EIC voyage #1 (1800–1802): Captain Matthew Isaacke sailed from Portsmouth on 28 June 1800, bound for St Helena, Bengal, and Bombay. She was part of a convoy of eight vessels under the escort of HMS Active, which was to take them as far as St Helena.

Skelton Castle reached St Helena on 22 September and arrived at Calcutta on 6 January 1801. Sailing for Bombay, she was at Kedgeree 26 February and reached Anjengo on 24 April. She arrived at Bombay on 7 May. Homeward bound, she reached St Helena on 8 November and arrived at The Downs on 19 January 1802.

Captain Isaacke brought with him a sample of hemp from Bombay for consideration for use in rope manufacture. There was some question of whether the Bombay hemp was Crotalaria juncea, that is, Bengal Sunn.

The "United Company of Merchants of England trading to the East Indies" offered 28,966 bags of rice for sale on 25 March. The rice had come in on Travers, Melville Castle, Skelton Castle, and Mornington.

EIC voyage #2 (1802–1803): Captain Frederick Pitman sailed from The Downs on 12 July 1802, bound for St Helena and Madras. Skelton Castle was at St Helena on 2 October and the Cape on 25 October. She arrived at Madras on 22 January 1803. Homeward bound, she was at St Helena again on 16 July, reached Cork on 17 September, and arrived at Portsmouth on 26 September. Pitman died at Île de France on 22 May 1803.

EIC voyage #3 (1804–1805): War with France had resumed while Skelton Castle was on her way home from her second voyage. For her third voyage for the EIC, Captain James Normand acquired a letter of marque on 4 August 1804. He sailed from Portsmouth on 4 September 1804, bound for Bengal. Skelton Castle was at Madeira on 27 September and Cochin on 13 February 1805. She arrived at Bombay on 4 March.

At Bombay Skelton Castle took on part of a cargo of tea that Brunswick had brought. Brunswick had had to put into Bombay for repairs while homeward bound from China. The EIC's Court of Directors decided to transship her cargo and send her back to China after the repairs had been completed.

Homeward bound, Skelton Castle reached St Helena on 28 August and arrived at The Downs on 22 December.

== Fate ==
Captain Henry Vaughan acquired a letter of marque on 26 May 1805. He sailed from Portsmouth on 24 September 1806, bound for Bengal.

On 21 December Skelton Castle parted from her consort, Union. (Lloyd's List reported on 24 March 1807 that Skelton Castle had parted from Union and Matilda on 10 December 1806 at 35°18′S 11°45′W.)

Captain Mackintosh, of Union, had signalled that he wanted to put into the Cape for water and fresh provisions. Vaughn replied that he did not need either and that he would take advantage off the fair winds and go on to Madras. It appears that Vaughn wanted Skelton Castle to be the first ship of the season to arrive in India and thereby benefit his own cargo.

Skelton Castle was never seen again. The EIC put the value of the cargo it had lost on Skelton Castle at £8,429.

There was a report that perhaps the French frigate Piémontaise had captured Skelton Castle off Aceh head, but that report proved false.
