= Hind (1800 ship) =

British merchant ship 1800–1815

History

Great Britain
- Name: Hind or Hinde
- Owner: 1800: Foster & Co.; 1801:Crosbie & Co.; 1808:Todd & co.; 1812:Kennan; 1814:Johns
- Builder: Hull
- Launched: 1800
- Fate: Wrecked April 1815 (Note: There is a report that the French captured her in 1814, but the vessel that was captured was probably Henry, Hind, master.)

General characteristics
- Tons burthen: 385, or 400 (bm)
- Propulsion: Sail
- Armament: 1801:12 × 6-pounder guns; 1815:14 × 12-pounder + 2 ×18-pounder guns

Hind or Hinde was launched at Hull in 1800. After a voyage to Russia she made one voyage for the British East India Company. She then became a West Indiaman. She was wrecked in April 1815.

== Career ==
Hind, of Hull, entered Lloyd's Register in 1800 with a burthen of 305 tons, Farthing, master, Foster, owner, and trade Hull—Archangel. In the 1801 edition her burthen was 385 tons, and her owner M. Foster. The other information was the same.

EIC voyage: Captain William Cattin (or Caitline) sailed from the Downs on 8 January 1801, bound for Bengal. William Catline tendered her to the EIC to bring back rice from Bengal. She was one of 28 vessels that sailed on that mission between December 1800 and February 1801.

Hind arrived at Calcutta on 24 June. Homeward bound, she was at Culpee on 5 September, reached Saint Helena on 31 December, and arrived at the Downs on 23 February 1802. On 30 March 1802 the Court of Directors of the United Company of Merchants trading with the East Indies (the EIC), announced that on 22 April they would offer for sale 37,000 bags of rice brought by Hind, Hope, Minerva, Ceres, and Bellona.

Lloyd's Register for 1802 made no mention of the voyage to India. It showed Hind's master changing from M. Farthing to E.Darby, her owner from Foster to Crosbie & Co., and her trade from Hull—Archangel to London—Jamaica. However, the Register of Shipping for 1802, which published earlier in the year than Lloyd's Register, showed HInd's master changing from Caitling to E. Darby, her owner from Foster to Crosby, and her trade from London—India to London—Jamaica.

Year	Master	Owner	Trade	Source
1805	E. Darby	Crosby & Co.	London—Barbados	Register of Shipping
1809	E. Darby; J. Young	Crosby & Co. Todd & Co.	London—Jamaica; London—Hayti	Register of Shipping
1810	Young	Todd & Co.	London—Grenada	Register of Shipping
1812	Kennan	Capt. & Co.	London—Surinam	Register of Shipping

== Fate ==
The Register of Shipping volume for 1815 shows Hind, of 384 tons (bm), launched at Hull in 1800, with J. Johns, master and owner, and trade London–Surinam.

Hind, Johns, master, from Surinam, was surveyed there and found unseaworthy. Still, Johns decided to sail on to England, possibly after repairs. On 14 April 1815 Hind, Johns, master, from Surinam to London, ran on shore in the back of the Goodwin Sands. She was totally lost but her master and crew landed at Margate. Only four bales of cotton and 90 bags of coffee were saved.
