= Nutwell (1800 ship) =

History

Great Britain
- Name: Nutwell
- Namesake: Nutwell
- Owner: 1800:Heathfield & Co., London; 1805:Pycroft
- Builder: Jacob Preston, Great Yarmouth
- Launched: 21 July 1800
- Fate: Foundered 21 August 1806

General characteristics
- Tons burthen: 378, or 426, or 42645/94, or 427 (bm)
- Propulsion: Sail
- Complement: 1800:28; 1803:25
- Armament: 1800:20 × 12-pounder guns; 1801:14 × 9-pounder carronades; 1803:12 × 24-pounder guns

Nutwell was launched at Great Yarmouth in 1800. She made one voyage for the British East India Company (EIC), bringing back rice from Bengal at the behest of the British government. On her return she became a West Indiaman, trading with Jamaica, until the 1806 Great Coastal hurricane overturned her.

== Career ==
EIC voyage (1801-1802): On 5 December 1800 Captain John Cristal acquired a letter of marque. Messrs. Princep and Saunders had tendered Nutwell, John Cristal, master, to the EIC to bring back rice from Bengal. She was one of 28 vessels that sailed on that mission between December 1800 and February 1801.

Cristal sailed from Portsmouth on 9 February 1801, bound for St Helena and Bengal. Nutwell reached the Cape of Good Hope on 20 April and Madras on 5 July, and arrived at Calcutta on 18 July. Christall drowned on 15 August. His replacement was Captain John Carse. Homeward bound, Nutwell was at Saugor on 24 September and reached the Cape on 22 December. Lloyd's List reported that Nutwell, Carse, master, had put into the Cape leaky. Nutwell left St Helena on 31 January 1802, in company with Sir John Borlase Warren. Nutwell arrived at the Downs on 25 March.

Nutwell first appears in the Register of Shipping in 1801 with J. Christol, master, Heathfield, owner, and trade London—Bengal.

On 15 December 1803 Captain John Dods (or Dodds) acquired a letter of marque. Lloyd's Register for 1803 shows that L. Dodd replaced Popplewell as master. Her trade was London—Jamaica.

Lloyd's Register for 1805 showed Nutwell with Thatcher, master, and Pycroft, owner. Her trade was still London—Jamaica.

== Fate ==
One report had Nutwell foundering in a gale on 21 August 1806. She had sprung a leak in a heavy gale whilst on passage from Jamaica for London and was upset. An American schooner took the crew off the wreck on the 27th.

Nutwell was one of 13 vessels of the Jamaica Fleet that were sunk in the August 1806 Great Coastal hurricane. Of the 109 vessels, by October five vessels of the 109 in the convoy were still unaccounted for, though only the 13 were known to have sunk. The seventy crew on the vessels known to have been lost were drowned, including all 29 men on Nutwell. (Other vessels lost include Exeter and Herculean.)
