= Phoenix (1790 ship) =

History

Great Britain
- Name: Phoenix
- Namesake: Phoenix
- Owner: First:Hibert & Co.; Subsequently: Various
- Builder: Randall & Brent, Rotherhithe
- Launched: 1790 (Note: Hackman gives a launch date of 27 September 1798. The year is clearly in error, and the whole date is identical to the date he gives for Phoenix launched in 1798.)
- Fate: Condemned in 1812

General characteristics
- Tons burthen: 573, 578, 592, 59227/94 (bm)
- Length: 127 ft 8 in (38.9 m) (overall); 103 ft 0 3/8 in (31.4 m) (keel)
- Beam: 31 ft 10 1/2 in (9.7 m)
- Depth of hold: 12 ft 4 in (3.8 m)
- Crew: 1793:70; 1795:60; 1796:70; 1799:60; 1800:100
- Armament: 1793: 20 × 9-pounder guns; 1795: 16 × 9-pounder guns; 1796: 20 × 9-pounder guns; 1798: 20 × 24-, 12-, and 6-pounder guns; 1799: 2 × 12-pounder + 6 × 6-pounder guns + 12 × 24-pounder carronades; 1800: 18 × 18-, 12- & 6-pounder guns; 1805: 8 × 12-pounder short guns of the "New Construction"; 1809: 2 × 12-pounder guns + 8 × 18-pounder carronades
- Notes: Three decks

Phoenix was a merchant ship launched on the Thames in 1790. She made one voyage as an extra ship (i.e., on short-term charter), for the British East India Company (EIC). Before that she had several masters and sailed under letters of marque. These authorized the vessel's master to engage in offensive action against the French, should the occasion arise, not just defend herself. After the voyage for the EIC Phoenix apparently traded as a West Indiaman until she was condemned in 1812.

== Early career ==
Phoenix was launched for Hibbert & Co., to serve as a West Indiaman. Lloyd's Register for 1792 gives the name of her master as "P. Stimpson", and her trade as London-Jamaica.

Lloyd's Register for 1799 gives the name of Phoenix's master as "J. Tyrie", her owner as "Glennie", and her trade as London-Jamaica.

== East India Company ==
For her voyage for the EIC, Captain John Tyrie applied for a letter of marque, which he received on 31 July 1798. (Note: James Tyrie received a letter of marque on 28 July 1798. John's letter, for a vessel of the same name and tonnage, was dated three days later, suggesting rectification of an error.) He left Falmouth on 14 September 1798, bound for Madras and Bengal.

Phoenix was part of a large convoy of merchantmen and transports, all under the escort of HMS Argo, HMS Pomone, and HMS Cormorant. The convoy included three other East Indiamen: Royal Charlotte, Cuffnells, and Alligator. On 25 September the convoy encountered a French fleet of nine sail, consisting of one eighty-gun ship and eight frigates. The convoy commander signaled the East Indiamen to form line of battle with the Royal Navy ships, and the convoy to push for Lisbon. This manoeuvre, and the warlike appearance of the Indiamen, deterred the French admiral from attacking them. The whole fleet reached Lisbon in safety. Phoenix reached Lisbon on 28 September and the Cape on 31 December, and arrived at Madras on 13 April 1799. She reached Calcutta on 20 May. Before leaving on the homeward-bound leg of her voyage, she loaded chests of arms that had been sent to the East India Company, but on arrival had been found defective, some due to damage by salt water due to "boistrous Weather", and that the company was returning to England.

On her homeward voyage she passed Kedgeree on 22 October and reached St Helena on 27 January 1800. She arrived at the Downs on 21 May.

== Subsequent service ==
Lloyd's Register and the Shipping Register carry Phoenix from 1800 to 1812. In the table below, a "†" by the eyr indicates that the data comes from the Register of Shipping. Lloyd's Register from 1809 on simply repeats the data from 1808.

On 13 September 1800 John Shaw received a letter of marque. The letter gives a crew size of 100 men, suggesting, if the number is correct, that Glennie & Co. wished to use her as a privateer. Certainly by 1802 it is clear that she is sailing as a West Indiaman, trading between London and Jamaica, and then London and Tobago.

Year	Master	Owner	Trade	Notes
1800	J.Tyrie/J. Shaw	Glennie	London - Jamaica	
1801	J. Shaw/J. Baird	Glennie	London - Jamaica	
1802	J. Baird	Robly & Co.	London - Tobago	No longer armed
1803	J. Baird	Robly & Co.	London - Tobago	
1804	J. Baird	Robly & Co.	London - Tobago	
1805	J. Baird	Robly & Co.	London - Tobago	8 × 12-pounder short guns of the "New Construction"
1806†	J. Baird	Robly & Co.	London - Tobago	6 × 12-pounder carronades
1807	J. Baird	Robly & Co.	London - Tobago	8 × 12-pounder short guns of the "New Construction"
1808	J. Baird	Robly & Co.	London - Tobago	Ditto
1809†	B. Bunn	Leverett	London-Cape of Good Hope; London transport	6 × 12-pounder carronades 2 × 12-pounder guns + 8 × 18-pounder carronades;
1810†	D. Farmer	Leverett	London transport	Ditto
1811†	D. Farmer	Leverett	London transport	Ditto
1812†	D. Farmer	Leverett	London transport	Ditto; Condemned
