= Mornington (1799 ship) =

History

Great Britain
- Name: Mornington
- Namesake: Possibly Richard Wellesley, 1st Marquess Wellesley
- Owner: Fairlie and Co.; Thomas Patrickson
- Builder: J. Gilmore & Co., Calcutta, India
- Launched: 1799, or 1800
- Fate: Burnt 1815

General characteristics
- Tons burthen: 668, or 700, or 750, or 768, or 770, or 799, or 800 (bm)
- Complement: 120
- Armament: 16 × 9-pounder guns,

Mornington was a British merchant vessel built of teak and launched in 1799 at Calcutta. She made three voyages under charter to the British East India Company (EIC). On the first of these her non-European crew suffered a high mortality rate on the voyage back to India. On the third French privateers twice captured her and Royal Navy vessels twice recaptured her. She was a transport for the British invasion of Java in 1811. A fire destroyed her in 1815.

== Career ==
=== EIC voyage #1 (1799-1801) ===
Under the command of Captain James Carnegy (or Carnageie), Mornington left Calcutta on 30 December 1799. She was at Saugor on 23 January 1800, reached St Helena on 8 June, and arrived at The Downs on 9 September. (Note: The British Library's website mistakes Mornington for Earl of Mornington (or Earl Mornington), launched in England in 1799 as a dispatch vessel.) Her complement consisted of eight Europeans (including her officers), ten native Portuguese, and 72 lascars and sepoys; two lascars and a Portuguese died on the voyage.

On 3 December 1800 Mornington sailed from England for Bombay and Bengal. In addition to her original crew, she also shipped 20 Europeans, seven native Portuguese sea-cunnies, and 19 lascars.

On 14 January 1801 HMS Argo was off Ferrol serving as escort for Mornington, Eliza Ann, and Exeter, which were bound for India, and a whaler. They encountered a small Spanish ship that Argo captured.

On Mornington's way home sickness broke out among the lascars and sepoys. The first death occurred on 28 March. By the time the pilot came on board on 5 May at Bengal, 56 men had died. All the deaths occurred among the native crew, lascars, and sepoys; the surviving native crew, lascars, and sepoys were almost all ill, but recovered rapidly when they got on shore. No Europeans on native Portuguese were affected.

Arran and Exeter left England at the same time as Mornington and experienced similar mortality results.

=== EIC voyage #2 (1801-02) ===
Captain George Kelso was in the Hugli River on 19 May 1801. On 23 June Mornington was at Kedgeree, and on 19 July Saugor. By 30 October she had reached the Cape of Good Hope, and by 20 November she was at St Helena. She arrived at The Downs on 19 January 1802.

The "United Company of Merchants of England trading to the East Indies" offered 28,966 bags of rice for sale on 25 March. The rice had come in on Travers, Melville Castle, Skelton Castle, and Mornington.

Mornington entered Lloyd's Register in the supplemental pages to the 1802 volume with "Kelsa", master, and "Fairly", owner. She was listed as being of 750 tons and three years old.

=== EIC voyage #3 (1804) ===
Captain Kelso sailed for Madras on 16 May 1804. She left Bengal on 5 July in company with the country ship Anna, and Maria, Northampton, and Princess Mary. The French privateer Nicholas Surcouf in Caroline captured Mornington on 14 August 1804. However, HMS Phaeton recaptured Mornington, before Captain Fallonard of the brig Île de France recaptured Mornington. (Note: On 8 April 1806 HMS Duncan captured Île de France. The notice in the London Gazette states that she was destroyed. French records indicate that on 15 May 1806, the French frigate Sémillante recaptured Île de France, but scuttled her as she was "of low value and a poor sailer".) Fallonard took Mornington, of 600 tons and six guns, into Port Nord-Ouest. The British recaptured Mornington yet again. (Note: A newspaper report dated 8 December 1804 states that HMS Tremendous had recaptured Mornington.) Mornington was reported at St Helena on 6 October, and completed her voyage on 18 December 1804.

=== Later career ===
Captain George Kelso received a letter of marque for Mornington on 22 February 1805. The Register of Shipping of 1805 carried Mornington, of 750 tons, built in Calcutta in 1798. It gave her master as Kelsa, and her owners as Fairlie & Co. Lloyd's Register had the same information, except it gave the year of launch as 1799.

Mornington was reported at St Helena on 23 September 1810. Captain David Dunlop, of Mornington, was reported to have died at Calcutta on 22 September 1809, but that appears to have been in error as he remains listed as Mornington's captain until her loss.

From 1810 or so on Mornington appears in lists of vessels based at Calcutta.

She participated as one of the transports in the British reduction of Java, under the auspices of Lord Minto. She was in the second division, which left Malacca on 7 June 1811.

== Fate ==
Mornington sailed for Bengal on 24 June 1815. She burnt off Nursapore (Narsapuram: 16°26′N 81°41.49′E) in October 1815. On 27 February 1816, Lloyd's List reported that Mornington, Dunlop, master, had been burnt in the Bay of Bengal.

The loss of Mornington to fire, after the similar loss of Radnor and later some other vessels, all on outward bound voyages, led the Calcutta Insurance Office to petition the Bengal government to investigate the matter. The insurers suspected arson by lascars impressed or induced to serve on the vessels.
