= Melville Castle (1786 EIC ship) =

History

United Kingdom
- Name: Melville Castle
- Namesake: Melville Castle
- Owner: EIC voyage #1:David Webster; EIC voyage #2:David Wedderburn; EIC voyages #3-6: David Webster; EIC voyage #7:7 William Hamilton; 1802:Dutch owners
- Builder: William Barnard, Deptford
- Launched: October 1786
- Fate: Sold 1802

Batavian Republic
- Name: Vreede or Vryheid
- Acquired: 1802 by purchase
- Fate: Wrecked 23 November 1802

General characteristics
- Tons burthen: 799, 806, or 80623/94 (bm)
- Length: Overall:143 ft 10 1/2 in (43.9 m); Keel:116 ft 5 in (35.5 m)
- Beam: 36 ft (11.0 m)
- Depth of hold: 14 ft 9 in (4.5 m)
- Sail plan: Full-rigged ship
- Complement: 1793:15; 1796:100; 1800:60
- Armament: 1793: 26 × 9- & 4-pounder guns; 1796: 26 × 9- & 4-pounder guns; 1800: 20 × 4- & 18-pounder guns

Melville Castle was launched in 1786 as an East Indiaman. She made seven voyages for the British East India Company (EIC). She was sold in 1802 to Dutch owners and wrecked with great loss of life later that year on her first voyage for them.

== Career ==
EIC voyage #1 (1787–1788): Captain Philip Dundas sailed from The Downs on 6 January 1787, bound for Bombay and China. Melville Castle reached Bombay on 22 May and arrived at Whampoa anchorage on 21 September. Homeward bound, she crossed the Second Bar on 11 January 1788, reached St Helena on 17 April, and arrived at The Downs on 24 June.

EIC voyage #2 (1789–1790): Captain Dundas sailed from The Downs on 26 February 1789, bound for Bengal. Melville Castle arrived at Diamond Harbour on 27 June. Homeward bound, she was at Culpee on 7 December, reached St Helena on 29 March 1790, and arrived at The Downs on 31 May.

Dundas brought back with him a rhinoceros, a present from the "King of Laknaor" (Lucknow?) to Henry Dundas, 1st Viscount Melville. Dundas had no real use for a rhinoceros so he sold it to Thomas Clarke for £700 for exhibition at the Essex Change. The rhinoceros died in 1793.

EIC voyage #3 (1792–1793): Captain Dundas sailed from The Downs on 8 March 1792, bound for Madras and Bengal. Melville Castle was at Johanna on 17 June, reached Madras on 21 July, and arrived at Diamond Harbour on 15 August. On 15 September she was at 'Broken Ground' and on 8 October at Masulipatam; she returned to Diamond Harbour on 14 December. Homeward bound, she was at Saugor on 18 January 1793, reached St Helena on 14 April, and arrived at Long Reach on 6 July.

Captain John Alexander Haldane: War with France had broken out while Melville Castle was returning from her third voyage. Captain John Alexander Haldane acquired a letter of marque on 19 November 1793.

However, the British government was contemplating an invasion of Île de France (Mauritius), and detained a large number of East Indiamen in England to serve as transports. It cancelled the planned expedition and released the vessels in May 1794. It paid Melville Castle's owners £ 2,562 10s for 123 days of demurrage for the delay in her voyage.

While Melville Castle was at Spithead, a mutiny broke out among the crew of the similarly detained Dutton after her captain had sent for a boat from a nearby warship to press some unruly members of his crew. Haldane rowed over to Dutton. He went on board where he talked with the mutineers, convincing them to return to work.

Also while he was waiting to sail, Haldane started reading the Bible. This had a profound effect on him and he decided to resign his command. Fortunately, he was able to find a replacement who was both acceptable to the EIC and as was the practice at the time, who could afford to purchase the command from Haldane.

EIC voyage #4 (1794–1795): It was Captain John Lambe who sailed Melville Castle from Portsmouth on 2 May 1794, bound for Madras and Bengal. She reached Madras on 11 September and arrived at Diamond Harbour on 15 October. Homeward bound, she was at Saugor on 28 January 1795, Madras on 1 April, and Trincomalee on 4 May. She reached St Helena on 13 August and arrived at Long Reach on 29 November.

EIC voyage #5 (1796–1797): Captain Lambe acquired a letter of marque on 20 April 1796. He sailed from Portsmouth on 27 June 1796, bound for Madras. Melville Castle reached the Cape of Good Hope on 19 September, and Madras on 9 January 1797. Homeward bound, she was at Trincomalle on 12 April and Simon's Bay on 12 July. She reached St Helena on 11 September and arrived at The Downs on 13 December.

EIC voyage #6 (1798–1799): Captain Lambe sailed from Portsmouth on 29 April 1798, bound for Bombay. Melville Castle reached Rio de Janeiro on 6 July and arrived at Bombay on 30 September. She visited Cannanore on 13 November before returning to Bombay on 31 December. Homeward bound, she reached St Helena on 1 May 1799 and arrived at The Downs on 13 July.

David Webster sold Melville Castle to William Hamilton. on 17 March 1800 the EIC chartered her for one voyage at a rate of £25/ton (bm), plus £7 15s per ton surplus.

EIC voyage #7 (1800–1802): Captain Lambe sailed from Portsmouth on 28 June 1800, bound for Bengal. Melville Castle reached St Helena on 22 September and arrived at Kedgeree on 4 January 1801. She then sailed for Bombay. She was at Saugor on 7 March and at Anjengo on 24 April. She arrived at Bombay on 7 May. Homeward bound, she reached St Helena on 8 November and arrived at The Downs on 19 January 1802.

The "United Company of Merchants of England trading to the East Indies" offered 28,966 bags of rice for sale on 25 March. The rice had come in on Travers, Melville Castle, Skelton Castle, and Mornington.

== Fate ==
Her owners sold Melville Castle to Dutch owners who renamed her Vreede (or Vryheid). She was repaired before the Batavian Republic chartered her to carry troops to the Dutch Cape Colony and Batavia, Dutch East Indies. Vreede set sail from Amsterdam on 21 November 1802, though two days later she was wrecked near Hythe, Kent. There were only 20 survivors (eight soldiers and 12 sailors), from a total complement of 474. The dead numbered 61 sailors, 312 enlisted soldiers, 12 officers, 20 male passengers, 22 female passengers and seven child passengers.
