= 1806 Great Coastal hurricane =

Category 2 Atlantic hurricane in 1806

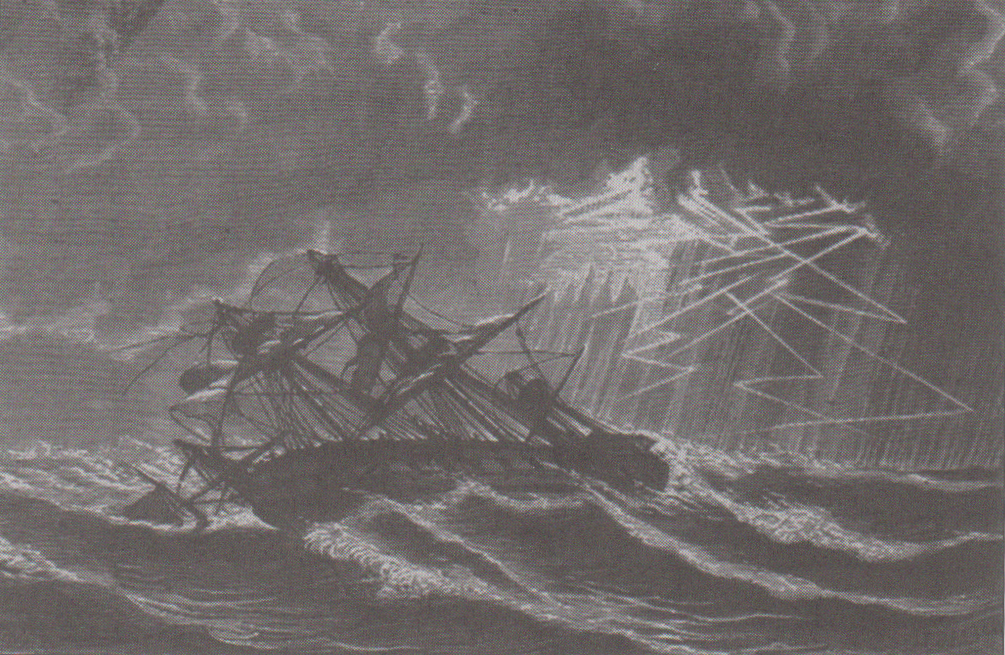
- Rose-in-Bloom overturning during the hurricane

Meteorological history
- Formed: August 17, 1806
- Dissipated: August 25, 1806

Category 2 hurricane
- 1-minute sustained (SSHWS/NWS)
- Highest winds: 110 mph (175 km/h)

Overall effects
- Fatalities: At least 24 total
- Damage: $171,000 (1806 USD)
- Areas affected: The Bahamas, Southeastern United States, Virginia, New England
- Part of the 1806 Atlantic hurricane season

The 1806 Great Coastal hurricane was a severe and damaging storm along the East Coast of the United States which produced upwards of 36 in (91 cm) of rainfall in parts of Massachusetts. First observed east of the Lesser Antilles on August 17, the hurricane arrived at the Bahamas by August 19. The disturbance continued to drift northward and made landfall at the mouth of the Cape Fear River in North Carolina on August 22. The storm soon moved out to sea as a Category 2-equivalent hurricane on the Saffir–Simpson hurricane wind scale, persisting off of New England before dissipating south of Nova Scotia on August 25 as a markedly weaker storm. Several French and British warships were damaged out at sea.

In the Carolinas, salt, sugar, rice, and lumber industries suffered considerably, and several individuals were killed. Wharves and vessels endured moderate damage, with many ships wrecked on North Carolinan barrier islands. A majority of the deaths caused by the hurricane occurred aboard the Rose-in-Bloom offshore of Barnegat Inlet, New Jersey, with 21 of the ship's 48 passengers killed and $171,000 (1806 USD) in damage to its cargo. (Note: All damage figures in the article are in 1806 United States dollars (USD) unless otherwise stated.) Upon arriving in New England, reports indicated extreme rainfall, though no deaths were reported; in all, the hurricane killed more than 24 individuals along the entirety of its track. (Note: Deaths are totaled as follows: 21 were killed aboard the Rose-in-Bloom, one died in a wall collapse at Wilmington, North Carolina, one drowned at a nearby plantation, and one died out at sea, off of the Core Banks. Although several slaves were killed, no exact number is known or has been estimated.)

== Meteorological history ==
The Great Coastal hurricane of 1806 was first noted far east of the Lesser Antilles on August 17. Weather historian David M. Ludlum followed the disturbance's track to the Bahamas by August 19; intense winds persisted until August 21, however, approximately 150 mi (240 km) east of the Bahamian island of Eleuthera. Steering currents brought the storm northward, and it approached Charleston, South Carolina on August 22, where a generally easterly flow preceded the storm indicated its passage far east of the city. The hurricane made landfall at the mouth of the Cape Fear River in North Carolina later that day, though the earliest impacts from the storm started several days earlier, with gusts initially toward the northeast but later curving southwestward. Reports of similar wind shifts throughout the region suggested that the gale persisted, stationary, for several hours. It eventually moved back out to sea while south of Norfolk, Virginia, departing the region on August 24. The hurricane maintained 1-minute maximum sustained winds of 110 mph (175 km/h) while offshore, equivalent to a Category 2 system on the Saffir–Simpson hurricane wind scale. While offshore New England, the gale featured a swath of winds 90 mi (150 km) wide, and was last observed just south of Nova Scotia on August 25 slightly weaker, with sustained winds of 75 mph (120 km/h).

== Impact ==
The hurricane damaged several vessels while still drifting at sea, dispersing and damaging Jérôme Bonaparte's fleet and dismasting the 74-gun French ship of the line Impétueux, which later landed near Cape Henry.

In Charleston, South Carolina, the hurricane washed aground several ships and uprooted numerous trees, though damage to the city harbor was minimal. The lighthouse on North Island flanking Winyah Bay collapsed under high winds, and in Georgetown proper, the hurricane was considered to be the worst since the 1804 Antigua–Charleston hurricane, despite its storm surge being of a lesser size. A cotton field covering 94 acres was ruined nearby. At Smithville, North Carolina, numerous ships experienced damage, while considerable destruction to structures was observed, with many wharves wrecked. Meanwhile, at Wilmington, the hurricane inflicted widespread damage, with many wharves severely damaged, and significant losses sustained by salt, sugar, rice, and lumber industries. The gable sections of three masonry houses were destroyed by wind or water, and wooden houses suffered especially badly, with many obliterated and those under construction flattened. One individual died after a wall collapsed and several slaves were killed, one by drowning, at local plantations. At Bald Head Island, the United States Revenue Cutter Service vessel Governor Williams was stripped of its foremast and subsequently ran ashore before being repaired and continuing on its journey. A second boat owned by the agency, the Diligence, was tethered at port in Wilmington and endured no damage; similarly, little impact occurred at New Bern. Throughout the storm, several vessels and supplies of stranded sailors were driven aground along the North Carolinan coast. On the Bogue Banks, the remains of the Adolphus and Atlantic were discovered, and at the Core Banks, a dead body was washed ashore, partially eaten by fish.

Moderate damage occurred upon the hurricane's arrival in Norfolk, Virginia. Winds toppled a number of newly built structures and chimneys, uprooted trees and fences, and washed two watercraft aground. After the storm, alterations to the shoreline around the Chesapeake Bay permitted the full establishment of a town at Willoughby Spit. The Rose-in-Bloom was caught in the hurricane while offshore of Barnegat Inlet, New Jersey, en route to New York City from Charleston, but was struck by a large wave which overturned the ship, resulting in the deaths of 21 of its 48 passengers and the loss of $171,000 of its $180,000 (1806 USD) cargo. The vessel only barely stayed afloat, with 30 bales of cotton preventing it from sinking entirely; survivors were ferried to New York by the British brig Swift, which had then been traveling toward St. John's, Newfoundland. The hurricane produced strong gusts within the vicinity of New York City, and at Belleville, New Jersey, several peach trees were defoliated and uprooted. Cape Cod, Massachusetts was struck by heavy rain and observed minor damage to its port. At Edgartown, meanwhile, an individual witnessed torrential rainfall, recording that a barrel was filled with 30 in (76 cm) of water, and estimating total rainfall reached 36 in (91 cm) there, where the storm devastated local crops and beached five cargo ships. At Brewster, meanwhile, severe damage to crops and salterns was noted, and 18 in (46 cm) of rainfall was recorded. Reports in Boston, however, indicate more modest rainfall amounts, with a precipitation rate of 0.40 in (1.0 cm) per hour noted.

== See also ==
- 1804 Antigua–Charleston hurricane
- 1806 Atlantic hurricane season
- List of New England hurricanes
- List of North Carolina hurricanes (pre-1900)
- Hurricane Isabel

== Notes ==
=== References ===
- Boose, Emery R.; Chamberlin, Kristen E.; Foster, David R. (2001). "Landscape and Regional Impacts of Hurricanes in New England" (PDF). Ecological Monographs. 71 (1): 27–48. doi:10.1890/0012-9615(2001)071[0027:LARIOH]2.0.CO;2. S2CID 9369240. Archived from the original (PDF) on September 29, 2015.
- Chenoweth, Michael (2006). "A Reassessment of Historical Atlantic Basin Tropical Cyclone Activity, 1700–1855" (PDF). Climatic Change. 76 (1–2): 169–240. Bibcode:2006ClCh...76..169C. doi:10.1007/s10584-005-9005-2. S2CID 154932650.
- Hairr, John (2008). The Great Hurricanes of North Carolina. Charleston, South Carolina: The History Press. ISBN 978-1-59629-391-5.
- Ludlum, David McWilliams (1963). Early American hurricanes, 1492–1870. Boston, Massachusetts: American Meteorological Society. ISBN 978-0-933876-16-3.
- Schwartz, Rick (2007). Hurricanes and the Middle Atlantic States. Alexandria, Virginia: Blue Diamond Books. ISBN 978-0-9786280-0-0.
