= List of ship launches in 1794 =

The list of ship launches in 1794 includes a chronological list of some ships launched in 1794.

Date	Ship	Class	Builder	Location	Country	Notes
2 January	Cormorant	Cormorant-class ship sloop	Randall & Brent	Rotherhithe	Kingdom of Great Britain	For Royal Navy.
3 January	Artois	Artois-class frigate	Richard Wells	Rotherhithe	Great Britain	For Royal Navy.
3 January	Républicaine française	Galathée-class frigate		Bordeaux	France	For French Navy.
4 January	Chalier	Chalier-class brick cannoniere		Cherbourg	France	For French Navy.
5 January	Mutine	Belliqueuse-class corvette	Jacques, Nicholas and Pierre Fortier	Honfleur	France	For French Navy.
6 January	Lady Shore	Merchantman		Calcutta	India	For James Willcocks.
16 January	Unité	Unité-class corvette	Jean Fouache	Le Havre	France	For French Navy.
17 January	Diligente	Naïade-class corvette		Brest	France	For French Navy.
22 January	Jemmapes	Téméraire-class ship of the line		Rochefort	France	For French Navy.
28 January	Principe de Asturias	Santa Ana-class ship of the line	Real Astillero de la Habana	Havana	(Spain) Cuba	For Spanish Navy.
January	Atalante	Brig-sloop		Bayonne	France	For French Navy.
January	Foudre	Vésuve-class gunbrig	Le Marchant	Saint-Malo	France	For French Navy.
January	Vengeance	Corvette		Bordeaux	France	For French Navy.
1 February	Favourite	Cormorant-class sloop	Randall & Brent	Rotherhithe	Great Britain	For Royal Navy.
3 February	Hornet	Cormorant-class sloop	Marmaduke Stalkart	Rotherhithe	Great Britain	For Royal Navy.
4 February	Jalouse	Belliqueuse-class corvette	Jacques, Nicholas, and Pierre Fortier	Honfleur	France	For French Navy.
14 February	Lynx	Cormorant-class sloop	William Cleverley	Gravesend	Great Britain	For Royal Navy.
15 February	Lark	Cormorant-class sloop	Thomas Pitcher	Northfleet	Great Britain	For Royal Navy.
15 February	Preneuse	Preneuse-class frigate		Rochefort	France	For French Navy.
February	Crachefeu	Chalier-class gun-brig		Cherbourg	France	For French Navy.
3 March	Diana	Artois-class frigate	Randall & Brent	Rotherhithe	Great Britain	For Royal Navy.
3 March	Duff	Full-rigged ship	Peter Everitt Mestaer	Rotherhithe	Great Britain	For J. Carbine.
3 March	Hazard	Cormorant-class sloop	Josiah & Thomas Brindley	Frindsbury	Great Britain	For Royal Navy.
11 March	Ceres	Merchantman	Thomas Fishburn	Whitby	Great Britain	For private owner.
17 March	Diamond	Artois-class frigate	William Barnard	Deptford	Great Britain	For Royal Navy.
17 March	Monarca	Montañés-class ship of the line	Reales Astilleros de Esteiro	Ferrol	Spain	For Spanish Navy.
18 March	Apollo	Artois-class frigate	Perry & Hankey	Blackwall	Great Britain	For Royal Navy.
19 March	Ranger	Pylades-class ship-sloop	Mellish Hill	Limehouse	Great Britain	For Royal Navy.
23 March	Barra	Téméraire-class ship of the line		Toulon	France	For French Navy.
30 March	Bonheur	Corvette	Antoine & Louis Crucy, and Jean Baudet	Nantes	France	For French Navy.
30 March	Jacobin	Sixth rate		Nantes	France	For French Navy.
31 March	Gloria Veneta	Fama-class ship of the line	Andrea Chiribiri	Venice	Republic of Venice	For Venetian Navy.
March	Requin	Requin-class cutter		Boulogne	France	For French Navy.
1 April	Victorieuse	Belliqueuse-class corvette	Pierre Alexander Forfait	Honfleur	France	For French Navy.
3 April	Jason	Artois-class frigate	John Dudman	Deptford	Great Britain	For Royal Navy.
3 April	Peterel	Pylades-class ship-sloop	John Wilson	Frindsbury	Great Britain	For Royal Navy.
29 April	Marat	Téméraire-class ship of the line		Rochefort	France	For French Navy.
29 April	Cocarde	Cocarde-class frigate		Saint-Malo	France	For French Navy.
April	Pylades	Pylades-class ship-sloop	Peter Everitt Mestaer	Rotherhithe	Great Britain	For Royal Navy.
1 May	Caledonian	Merchantman	John & William Scott	Greenock	Great Britain	For Hunter & Co.
1 May	Constance	Sixth rate		Le Havre	France	For French Navy.
5 May	Kizliar	Kizliar-class bomb vessel	Vasily Vlasov	Kazan	Russia	For Imperial Russian Navy.
12 May	Aimwell	Conquest-class gunvessel	John Perry	Blackwall	Great Britain	For Royal Navy.
12 May	Pelter	Conquest-class gunvessel	John Perry	Blackwall	Great Britain	For Royal Navy.
17 May	Borer	Conquest-class gunvessel	John Randall	Rotherhithe	Great Britain	For Royal Navy.
17 May	Galatea	Fifth rate	George Parsons	Bursledon	Great Britain	For Royal Navy.
17 May	Plumper	Conquest-class gunvessel	John Randall	Rotherhithe	Great Britain	For Royal Navy.
26 May	Teazser	Conquest-class gunvessel	John Dudman	Deptford	Great Britain	For Royal Navy.
28 May	Révolutionnaire	Seine-class frigate		Le Havre	France	For French Navy.
28 May	Tickler	Conquest-class gunvessel	Mellish Hill	Limehouse	Great Britain	For Royal Navy.
29 May	Droits de l'Homme	Téméraire-class ship of the line		Lorient	France	For French Navy.
31 May	Bravo	Firm-class floating battery	John Tovery	Woolwich	Great Britain	For Royal Navy.
31 May	Firm	Firm-class floating battery	Martin Ware	Deptford	Great Britain	For Royal Navy.
31 May	Swinger	Conquest-class gunvessel	Mellish Hill	Limehouse	Great Britain	For Royal Navy.
May	Montañés	Montañés-class ship of the line		Ferrol	Spain	For Spanish Navy.
2 June	Piercer	Conquest-class gunvessel	King	Dover	Great Britain	For Royal Navy.
11 June	Seahorse	Artois-class frigate	Marmaduke Stalkartt	Rotherhithe	Great Britain	For Royal Navy.
14 June	Spanker	Spanker-class floating battery	William Barnard	Deptford	Great Britain	For Royal Navy.
18 June	Cerere	Sixth rate			Republic of Venice	For Venetian Navy.
26 June	Montagne	Fifth rate		location	France	For French Navy
28 June	Attack	Conquest-class gunvessel	John Wilson & Co.	Frindsbury	Great Britain	For Royal Navy.
28 June	Prince of Wales	Boyne-class ship of the line		Portsmouth Dockyard	Great Britain	For Royal Navy.
28 June	Stag	Fifth rate	Thomas Pollard	Chatham Dockyard	Great Britain	For Royal Navy.
28 June	Vertu	Frigate		Lorient	France	For French Navy.
June	Fearless	Conquest-class gunvessel	William Cleverley	Gravesend	Great Britain	For Royal Navy.
12 July	Berceau	Corvette		Lorient	France	For French Navy.
12 July	Unicorn	Pallas-class frigate	John Nelson and Thomas Pollars	Chatham Dockyard	Great Britain	For Royal Navy.
26 July	Virginie	Virginie-class frigate		Brest	France	For French Navy.
July	Conquest	Conquest-class gunvessel	Josiah & Thomas Brindley	Frindsbury	Great Britain	For Royal Navy.
9 August	Sviatoi Pavel	Second rate	S. I. Afasaneyev	Nicholaieff	Russia	For Imperial Russian Navy.
25 August	Sviataia Elisaveta	Aleksandr-class rowing frigate	D. Masalsky	Saint Petersburg	Russia	For Imperial Russian Navy.
25 August	Sviataia Mariia	Aleksandr-class rowing frigate	D. Masalsky	Saint Petersburg	Russia	For Imperial Russian Navy.
27 August	Britannia	Brig	Thomas Pitcher	Northfleet	Great Britain	For H. Jackson.
August	Courageuse	Virginie-class frigate	Jacques-Noël Sané	Brest	France	For French Navy.
5 September	Minerve	Minerve-class frigate	Joseph-Marie Blaise Coulomb	Toulon	France	For French Navy.
23 September	Princess Royal	West Indiaman	Jacob Preston	Great Yarmouth	Great Britain	For Simms & Co.
24 September	Gabriel	Full-rigged ship	Gabriel Gillett	Calcutta	India	For Hamilton & Co.
25 September	Artémise	Magicienne-class frigate		Toulon	France	For French Navy.
25 September	Cerberus	Alcmene-class frigate	Adams	Buckler's Hard	Great Britain	For Royal Navy.
26 September	Forte	Forte-class frigate		Lorient	France	For French Navy.
27 September	Danmark	Third rate	Ernst Wilhelm Stibolt	Copenhagen	Denmark-Norway	For Dano-Norwegian Navy.
1 October	Romaine	Romaine-class frigate		Le Havre	France	For French Navy.
6 October	Ariadne	Full-rigged ship	G. & N. Langborne	Whitby	Great Britain	For Lacy Lotherington.
6 October	Arniston	East Indiaman	William Barnard	Deptford	Great Britain	For British East India Company.
8 October	Wattignies	Téméraire-class ship of the line		Lorient	France	For French Navy.
10 October	Décade	Galathée-class frigate	Pierre Guibert	Bordeaux	France	For French Navy.
23 October	Lively	Alcmene-class frigate	John Nowlan	Northam	Great Britain	For Royal Navy.
25 October	Mars	Mars-class ship of the line	Martin Ware	Deptford Dockyard	Great Britain	For Royal Navy.
October	Patriote	Coquille-class frigate	Raymond-Antoine Haran	Bayonne	France	For French Navy.
1 November	Kotka	Kotka-class brig			Russia	For Imperial Russian Navy.
1 November	Kutsal Mulim	Kotka-class brig			Russia	For Imperial Russian Navy.
1 November	Régénérée	Cocarde-class frigate		Saint-Malo	France	For French Navy.
5 November	Sviatoi Pyotr	Sviatoi Pyotr-class ship of the line	A. S. Katsanov	Kherson	Russia	For Imperial Russian Navy.
8 November	Alcmene	Alcmene-class frigate	Joseph Graham	Harwich	Great Britain	For Royal Navy.
8 November	Vengeance	Vengeance-class frigate		Paimboeuf	France	For French Navy.
Summer	Phoenix	Merchantman		Voskresenskaia	(Russian Empire) Russian America	For Shelikhov-Golikov Company.
Unknown date	Affiance	Merchantman	John & Philip Laing	Sunderland	Great Britain	For private owner.
Unknown date	Amphitrite	Merchantman		Hamburg	Hamburg	For private owner.
Unknown date	Arslan-ı Bahri	Third rate	Jacques Balthazar Brun de Sainte Catherine	Constantinople	Ottoman Empire	For Ottoman Navy.
Unknown date	Barton	West Indiaman		Liverpool	Great Britain	For Barten & Co.
Unknown date	Bellona	Bellona-class frigate	Fredrik Henrik af Chapman	Karlskrona	Sweden	For Royal Swedish Navy.
Unknown date	Benson	West Indiaman		Liverpool	Great Britain	For Benson & Co.
Unknown date	Bonne Citoyenne	Bonne Citoyenne-class corvette			France	For French Navy.
Unknown date	Calcutta	Full-rigged ship		Calcutta	India	For private owner.
Unknown date	Caldicot Castle	Merchantman		Caldicot	Great Britain	For H. Wife.
Unknown date	Chambers	Merchantman		Liverpool	Great Britain	For Robert Bent.
Unknown date	Coldstream Packet	Smack		Berwick upon Tweed	Great Britain	For private owner.
Unknown date	Cornwall	Full-rigged ship		Plymouth	Great Britain	Private owner
Unknown date	Dandy	Schooner	Nicholas Bools	Bridport	Great Britain	For Ord & Co.
Unknown date	Dart	Packet boat	Young	Rotherhithe	Great Britain	For British East India Company.
Unknown date	Lord Howe	East Indiaman	Robert Batson	Limehouse	Great Britain	For British East India Company.
Unknown date	Experiment	Merchantman			Great Britain	For private owner.
Unknown date	Force	Conquest-class gunvessel	Thomas Pitcher	Northfleet	Great Britain	For Royal Navy.
Unknown date	Galatea	Fifth rate	George Parsons	Bursledon	Great Britain	For Royal Navy.
Unknown date	Ganges	Merchantman		Philadelphia, Pennsylvania	United States	For private owner.
Unknown date	Ganges	Brig		Bombay	India	For Bengal Pilot Service.
Unknown date	Harmony	Merchantman		New England	United States	For private owner.
Unknown date	Hooghly	Brig		Bombay	India	For Bombay Pilot Service.
Unknown date	Horta	Brig	John & Philip Laing	Sunderland	Great Britain	For Captain Forster.
Unknown date	Lacédémonienne	Privateer			France	For private owner.
Unknown date	Lady Cathcart	Merchantman		Leith	Great Britain	For R. Bruce.
Unknown date	Lapwing	West Indiaman		Bristol	Great Britain	For G. Fisher.
Unknown date	Nehalannia	Sixth rate		Vlissingen	Dutch Republic	For Dutch Navy.
Unknown date	Nieuwland	East Indiaman		Amsterdam	Dutch Republic	For Dutch East India Company.
Unknown date	Nonsuch	Schooner			United States	For private owner.
Unknown date	Ocean	Merchantman		South Shields	Great Britain	For Hurry & Co.
Unknown date	Orpheus	Merchantman	John Troughton	Chester	Great Britain	For John St Barbe & Co.
Unknown date	Pomona	Fifth rate		Ferrol	Spain	For Spanish Navy.
Unknown date	Prince of Wales	Cutter	Scotts	Greenock	Great Britain	For Board of Customs.
Unknown date	Renown	Whaler		New Bedford, Massachusetts	United States	For private owner.
Unknown date	Roebuck	Merchantman		New England	United States	For S. Hughes.
Unknown date	Royalist	Merchantman		Sunderland	Great Britain	For private owner.
Unknown date	Sandfly	Musquito-class floating battery	Wells & Co.	Deptford	Great Britain	For Royal Navy.
Unknown date	Thames	Merchantman		London	Great Britain	For Mr. Tranham.
Unknown date	Thetis	Merchantman		Chittagong	India	For private owner.
Unknown date	Union Island	Merchantman		Bristol	Great Britain	For private owner.
Unknown date	Vivo	Brig		Cádiz	Spain	For Spanish Navy.
Unknown date	Wright	Merchantman	Thomas Hearn	North Shields	Great Britain	For private owner.
Unknown date	Young William	Full-rigged ship		Whitby	Great Britain	For private owner.
Unknown date	Name unknown	Merchantman			France	For private owner.
Unknown date	Name unknown	Merchantman			Spain	For private owner.
Unknown date	Name unknown	Merchantman		Spain or Brazil	Unknown	For private owner.
Unknown date	Name unknown	Merchantman			Spain	For private owner.
Unknown date	Name unknown	Merchantman			France	For private owner.
