= Amphitrite (ship) =

Several vessels have been named Amphititre for Amphitrite, the sea goddess of Greek mythology:

- Amphitrite (1789 ship)'s origins are obscure. She first appeared in Lloyd's Register in 1789. Her entry notes that she had been almost rebuilt in 1783 and had undergone a good repair in 1788, presumably under a different name. From 1789 to 1799 she was a whaler in the Northern (Greenland) Whale Fishery. She then started on a voyage as a slave ship but capsized off the coast of Africa.
- Amphitrite (1790 ship) was launched at Whitby. A French privateer captured her in 1794, but the Royal Navy quickly recaptured her. She spent much of her career as a West Indiaman, finishing as a London transport. She was last listed in 1810 or 1811.
- Amphitrite (1791 ship) was launched at Scarborough. In 1793–1794 she served the British Royal Navy as a hired armed vessel. She was last listed in 1797.
- Amphitrite (1794 ship) was launched at Hamburg. She traded primarily between London and Hambro. A French privateer captured her in 1798.
- Amphitrite (1796 ship) was launched at Kingston upon Hull. A French privateer captured her in 1799 on Amphitrite's first voyage as a slave ship.
- Amphitrite (1802 ship) was built at Appledore, Torridge, (equally Bideford). Under various owners and masters she traded across the North Atlantic and to the Baltic. She wrecked in 1833 with heavy loss of life while transporting female convicts to New South Wales.

== See also ==
- HMS Amphitrite, any of six naval vessels by that name
- USS Amphitrite, any of three naval vessels by that name
- French ship Amphitrite, any of eight naval vessels by that name
