= Amphitrite (disambiguation) =

Amphitrite is a sea goddess of Greek mythology.

Amphitrite may also refer to:

== Ships ==
=== Military ===
- HMS Amphitrite, seven ships of the British Royal Navy
- USS Amphitrite, three ships of the US Navy
- Amphitrite-class monitor, a class of four U.S. Navy monitors
- French ship Amphitrite, several ships of the French Navy
- Amfitriti, several submarines of the Hellenic Navy
- Amphitriti IV (yacht) (1865-1941), part of the Hellenic Navy; yacht of the Greek Royal Family (1895-1917), floating military hospital (1918), school ship and submarine supply ship (1934); sunk in April 1941
- HM Amphitrite, a Royal Netherlands Navy corvette in service in the 1830s (and possibly other Dutch ships)
- Amfitrite (coastguard vessel) (1978), a multipurpose Swedish Coast Guard vessel

=== Civilian ===
- French frigate Amphitrite (1696), a French sailing ship who carried a Jesuit mission to China in 1698 led by Joachim Bouvet, depicted by Giovanni Battista Gherardini in Relation Du Voyage Fait à la Chine Sur Le Vaisseau L'Amphitrite, En L'Année 1698
- Amphitrite (1802 ship), wrecked off Boulogne en route Australia in 1833
- Amphitrite (1887), a 44-m British then German schooner currently belonging to Clipper DJS
- Amphitrite (sloop) (1927), a French oyster sloop classified as a monument historique
- Amphitrite (yacht) (2001), a luxury yacht once belonging to American actor Johnny Depp

== Other uses ==
- Amphitrite Point Lighthouse, a lighthouse near Ucluelet, British Columbia, Canada
- 29 Amphitrite, an asteroid named for the sea goddess
- Amphitrite (annelid), a genus of worms of the polychaete family Terebellidae
- Amphitrite (fungus), a genus of fungi in the family Halosphaeriaceae
- Sud-Est SE.200 Amphitrite, a French six-engine flying boat airliner first flown in 1942
- Amphitrite Pool, a shallow ceremonial pool on the grounds of the United States Merchant Marine Academy with a statue of Amphitrite
