= Royalist (ship) =

Several vessels have been named Royalist:

- Royalist (1794 ship) was launched at Sunderland. She was a general trader until 1812 when she became a Northern Whale Fishery whaler. She was lost in 1814 while whaling at Greenland.
- HMS Royalist was launched in 1807. She captured many privateers and letters of marque, most French, but also some from Denmark and the United States. Her crew twice were awarded the Naval General Service Medal. She was instrumental in the capture of a French frigate. The Royal Navy sold her in 1819. She then became a whaler, making three complete voyages. She was condemned after a mishap while on her fourth.
