= List of shipwrecks in March 1825 =

The list of shipwrecks in March 1825 includes some ships sunk, wrecked or otherwise lost during March 1825.

== 1 March ==
List of shipwrecks: 1 March 1825
Ship	State	Description
Adam	United Kingdom	The ship was driven ashore and wrecked at Deal, Kent. She was on a voyage from London to the South Seas.
Jessie	United Kingdom	The ship sprang a leak and foundered off Rathlin Island, County Antrim. She was on a voyage from Greenock, Renfrewshire to Limerick.
Juliana	(United Kingdom of Great Britain and Ireland) Guernsey	The ship was driven ashore at Great Yarmouth, Norfolk. She was on a voyage from Guernsey to Newcastle upon Tyne, Northumberland. Juliana was refloated on 3 March and taken in to Great Yarmouth for repairs.
Kent	British East India Company	Burning of 'The Kent', 1st March 1825 (William Daniell, c. 1827) The East Indiaman was destroyed by fire in the Bay of Biscay with the loss of 81 Lives. Of the survivors, 547 people were rescued by Cambria and fourteen by Caroline (both United Kingdom). Kent was on a voyage from London to Bengal, India.
Zeemeuw	Netherlands	The ship departed from Curaçao for Amsterdam, North Holland. No further trace, presumed foundered with the loss of all hands.

== 2 March ==
List of shipwrecks: 2 March 1825
Ship	State	Description
Maria	Rostock	The ship struck a rock off Beadnell, Northumberland, United Kingdom and foundered. Her crew were rescued. She was on a voyage from Leith, Lothian to Sunderland, County Durham, United Kingdom.

== 3 March ==
List of shipwrecks: 3 March 1825
Ship	State	Description
Aid	United Kingdom	The sloop was wrecked at Wick, Caithness.
Florida	United States	The ship was swamped at sea with the loss of 24 of the 40 people on board. Ten of the survivors reached land in the ship's longboat. The fate of the other six is not known. Florida was on a voyage from St. Augustine, Florida to Havana, Cuba.

== 4 March ==
List of shipwrecks: 4 March 1825
Ship	State	Description
Caroline	United Kingdom	The ship was driven ashore at Saltfleet Haven, Lincolnshire. She was on a voyage from Spalding, Lincolnshire to London.
General Jackson	United States	The ship was abandoned whilst on a voyage from Curaçao to New York.
Highlander	United Kingdom	The ship was wrecked on the Banjaard Bank, in the North Sea off the coast of Zeeland, Netherlands. She was on a voyage from Falmouth, Cornwall to Antwerp, Netherlands.
Johanna Dorothea	Bremen	The ship was driven ashore near Wells-next-the-Sea, Norfolk, United Kingdom. She was on a voyage from Bremen to Hull, Yorkshire, United Kingdom.
Perfection	United Kingdom	The ship ran aground near Sandy Island, Grenada. She was on a voyage from Irvin's Bay to Levera, Grenada. Perfection was refloated and taken in to St. George's, Grenada for repairs.

== 5 March ==
List of shipwrecks: 5 March 1825
Ship	State	Description
Ana	Roberto Cofresí	West Indies anti-piracy operations of the United States, Capture of the Anne:The sloop was abandoned off Puerto Rico after a battle with USS Grampus (United States Navy) with assistance from La Invencible ( Gran Colombia) and San José y las Animas ( (Denmark) Danish West Indies). She subsequently ran aground and was captured by marines from USS Grampus.
Mercury	United Kingdom	The whaling brig veered onto rocks and was wrecked while making a hasty escape from an impending attack by Māori in Whangaroa Bay, New Zealand. Her crew were rescued.

== 6 March ==
List of shipwrecks: 6 March 1825
Ship	State	Description
Chance	United Kingdom	The sloop foundered in the Firth of Tay off Balmerino, Fife. Her crew survived.
Fowey	United Kingdom	The ship was severely damaged at Penzance, Cornwall.
Lord Nelson	United Kingdom	The ship was wrecked at Tynemouth Castle, Northumberland. She was on a voyage from Sunderland, County Durham to London.
Mally	United Kingdom	The ship was driven ashore at Castletown, Isle of Man. She was on a voyage from Liverpool, Lancashire to Limerick.
Marchant	United Kingdom	The ship was wrecked on the Black Middings, in the North Sea off the coast of County Durham. She was on a voyage from Sunderland to London.
Princess Elizabeth	United Kingdom	The ship foundered in Freshwater Bay, off the coast of Pembrokeshire. She was on a voyage from Bristol, Gloucestershire to Liverpool, Lancashire.
Two Sisters	United Kingdom	The ship was driven ashore and wrecked near Campbeltown, Argyllshire. She was on a voyage from Newry, County Antrim to Glasgow, Renfrewshire.

== 7 March ==
List of shipwrecks: 7 March 1825
Ship	State	Description
Alice	United Kingdom	The steamboat caught fire in the River Mersey at Liverpool, Lancashire and was scuttled. She was subsequently wrecked by the action of the tide.
Charles XIV	Sweden	The ship was driven ashore and wrecked near Dunbar, Lothian, United Kingdom. Her crew were rescued. She was on a voyage from Gothenburg to Grangemouth, Stirlingshire, United Kingdom. Charles XIV was refloated on 19 March and taken in to Dunbar.
Dandy	United Kingdom	The ship struck a sunken wreck and foundered in the North Sea off the Dudgeon Lightship ( Trinity House). Her crew were rescued by Jane (United Kingdom). She was on a voyage from Dundee, Forfarshire to London.
Friends	United Kingdom	The ship was driven ashore and wrecked on Spurn Point, Yorkshire. She was on a voyage from London to Gainsborough, Lincolnshire.
Jane	United Kingdom	The ship foundered in the North Sea off Cullercoats, County Durham. She was on a voyage from Sunderland, County Durham to London.
Mally	United Kingdom	The ship was driven ashore at Douglas, Isle of Man. Her crew were rescued. She was on a voyage from Liverpool, Lancashire to Limerick.
Merchant	United Kingdom	The ship was wrecked on the Black Middings, in the North Sea of North Shields, County Durham.

== 8 March ==
List of shipwrecks: 8 March 1825
Ship	State	Description
Aid	United Kingdom	The sloop was wrecked at Wick, Caithness with the loss of two of her crew.
Hope	United Kingdom	The ship was driven onto the Ballywalter Long Rock. She was on a voyage from Belfast, County Antrim to Trinidad. Hope was refloated on 10 March and taken in to Belfast.
Mercury	United Kingdom	The ship was driven onto the Stack Rock, Pembrokeshire and was severely damaged. She was on a voyage from Bideford to Charleston, South Carolina, United States.
Minerva	United States	The ship ran aground on the Calot Bank, in the North Sea off the coast of Zeeland, Netherlands. She was on a voyage from Charleston, South Carolina to Antwerp, Netherlands. Minerva was refloated on 10 March.

== 9 March ==
List of shipwrecks: 9 March 1825
Ship	State	Description
Oscar	United States	The ship sprang a leak and was abandoned in the Atlantic Ocean. She was on a voyage from Lisbon, Portugal to Buenos Aires, Argentina. Her crew survived.

== 10 March ==
List of shipwrecks: 10 March 1825
Ship	State	Description
Elizabeth	United Kingdom	The ship ran aground near Aberfrow, Anglesey. She was declared a total loss. Elizabeth was on a voyage from Demerara to Glasgow, Renfrewshire.
Jane	United Kingdom	The ship departed from Belfast, County Antrim for Saint John, New Brunswick, British North America. No further trace, presumed foundered in the Atlantic Ocean with the loss of all hands.
Venus	United States	The ship was lost in Cuma Bay, Brazil.

== 11 March ==
List of shipwrecks: 11 March 1825
Ship	State	Description
Antonia Ulrica	Netherlands	The brig ran aground east of the Birling Gap, Sussex, United Kingdom. All on board were rescued. She was on a voyage from Rio de Janeiro, Brazil to Antwerp. Antonia Ulrica was refloated on 13 March and taken in to Newhaven, Sussex, where she was declared not worthy of repair.

== 12 March ==
List of shipwrecks: 12 March 1825
Ship	State	Description
Stanley	United Kingdom	The ship was driven ashore on the coast of Lincolnshire. She was on a voyage from Sunderland, County Durham to Poole, Dorset.
Vine	United Kingdom	The ship was driven ashore and wrecked on The Shingles, Isle of Wight. She was on a voyage from Cephalonia, United States of the Ionian Islands to Hull, Yorkshire. Vine was refloated on 15 March and towed in to Portsmouth, Hampshire by HMS Lightning (Royal Navy).

== 13 March ==
List of shipwrecks: 13 March 1825
Ship	State	Description
Ezer	United Kingdom	The ship was wrecked on the Nore. She was on a voyage from Selby, Yorkshire to London.
Havana Packet	United States	The ship was wrecked in the Caicos Islands. She was on a voyage from Newcastle to Jamaica.

== 14 March ==
List of shipwrecks: 14 March 1825
Ship	State	Description
Twey Gezusters	Netherlands	The ship foundered whilst on a voyage from the Vlie to a Norwegian port. Her crew were rescued by a fishing vessel.

== 16 March ==
List of shipwrecks: 16 March 1825
Ship	State	Description
Caroline	United Kingdom	The ship was driven ashore near Helsingborg, Sweden. She was on a voyage from London to Pillau, Prussia.
Columbia	United States	The ship was driven ashore and wrecked at Manasquan, New Jersey. She was on a voyage from Bremen to New York City.
Ohio	United States	The ship was wrecked on the West Bank, New York. She was on a voyage from Belfast, County Antrim, United Kingdom to New York City.

== 17 March ==
List of shipwrecks: 17 March 1825
Ship	State	Description
Caroline	United Kingdom	The whaler departed from Port Jackson, New South Wales for Macquarie Island on 17 November 1824. The ship was driven aground on the island during a gale. All crew survived, and were marooned on the island for five months.
Foyle	United Kingdom	The ship foundered off Bannow, County Wexford. Her crew were rescued. She was on a voyage from Cardiff, Glamorgan to Youghal, County Cork.
Hannah	United Kingdom	The schooner was wrecked on the Black Middings, in the North Sea off South Shields, County Durham. Her crew were rescued.
Jane	United Kingdom	The ship was driven ashore near Helsingborg, Sweden. She was on a voyage from London to Riga, Russia.
Jubilee	United Kingdom	The ship was abandoned in the Atlantic Ocean. She was on a voyage from Maranhão, Brazil to Liverpool, Lancashire.

== 18 March ==
List of shipwrecks: 18 March 1825
Ship	State	Description
Catherine	United Kingdom	The ship was driven ashore in Dundrum Bay. Her eight crew were rescued. She was on a voyage from Workington, Cumberland to Dundalk, County Louth.
Friends	United Kingdom	The ship ran dagound at Ilfracombe, Devon and was beached. She was on a voyage from Bristol, Gloucestershire to Dartmouth, Devon.
John Little	United Kingdom	The ship foundered in Dundrum Bay with the loss of thirteen of her fifteen crew. She was on a voyage from Liverpool, Lancashire to Nova Scotia, British North America.
Prospect	United Kingdom	The ship ran aground in the River Tyne and was severely damaged.
Thomas Jackson	United Kingdom	The ship struck the Cramston Rock, in the North Sea off the Farne Islands, Northumberland and foundered with the loss of six lives. She was on a voyage from Hull, Yorkshire to Leith, Lothian and the River Plate.

== 19 March ==
List of shipwrecks: 19 March 1825
Ship	State	Description
Elizabeth	United Kingdom	The ship struck a rock off Holyhead, Anglesey and was wrecked. She was on a voyage from Demerara to Glasgow, Renfrewshire.

== 20 March ==
List of shipwrecks: 20 March 1825
Ship	State	Description
Jenny	United Kingdom	The ship struck a sunken wreck on the Nore and was consequently beached on the Blye Sand. She was on a voyage from South Shields, County Durham.

== 21 March ==
List of shipwrecks: 21 March 1825
Ship	State	Description
Nancy	United States	The ship was wrecked at Ocracoke, North Carolina. She was on a voyage from Washington, North Carolina to Demerara.

== 22 March ==
List of shipwrecks: 22 March 1825
Ship	State	Description
Commerce	United Kingdom	The ship struck rocks at St. Mary's, Isles of Scilly and was damaged. She was on a voyage from Porthmadog, Caernarfonshire to London.

== 23 March ==
List of shipwrecks: 23 March 1825
Ship	State	Description
Julia	Netherlands	The ship was wrecked on the Sloe Sandbank, in the North Sea off the coast of Zeeland. She was on a voyage from Rotterdam, South Holland to Antwerp.

== 26 March ==
List of shipwrecks: 26 March 1825
Ship	State	Description
Boldon	United Kingdom	The ship was driven ashore at Ystad, Sweden. She was on a voyage from Newcastle upon Tyne, Northumberland to Memel, Prussia. Boldon was later refloated.
William & Mary	United Kingdom	The ship ran aground and sank at Most Point, Devon. She was on a voyage from Swansea, Glamorgan to St. Ann's.

== 27 March ==
List of shipwrecks: 27 March 1825
Ship	State	Description
Alert	United Kingdom	The ship was abandoned in the Atlantic Ocean. Her crew were rescued by Temeraire (United Kingdom). She was on a voyage from Batavia, Netherlands East Indies to Rotterdam, South Holland, Netherlands.
Hopewell	United Kingdom	The ship was wrecked on Bornholm, Denmark. Her crew survived. She was on a voyage from Hull, Yorkshire to Memel, Prussia.
Resolution	Hamburg	The ship was wrecked at Haroldswick, Shetland Islands, United Kingdom with the loss of all but her captain. She was on a voyage from Hamburg to New Orleans, Louisiana, United States.
Stag	United Kingdom	The ship was wrecked on Bornholm. Her crew survived. She was on a voyage from Newcastle upon Tyne, Northumberland to Memel.
Trader	United Kingdom	The ship was wrecked on Bornholm. Her crew were rescued. She was on a voyage from Newcastle upon Tyne to Memel.
Woodhouse	United Kingdom	The ship was wrecked on Bornholm. She was on a voyage from Newcastle upon Tyne to Danzig.

== 28 March ==
List of shipwrecks: 28 March 1825
Ship	State	Description
Maria	Stettin	The ship was wrecked on the Falsterbo Reef, in the Baltic Sea with the loss of all but one of her crew. She was on a voyage from Lisbon, Portugal to Stettin.

== 29 March ==
List of shipwrecks: 29 March 1825
Ship	State	Description
Brunswick	Hamburg	The ship ran aground on Scharhörn. She was on a voyage from Hull, Yorkshire, United Kingdom to Hamburg. Brunswick was refloated on 31 March and taken in to Hamburg.

== Unknown date ==
List of shipwrecks: Unknown date in March 1825
Ship	State	Description
Carl Johan	Grand Duchy of Tuscany	The full-rigged ship was wrecked on the Florida Reef. She was on a voyage from Havana, Cuba to a Mediterranean port.
Courier	Netherlands	The ship was wrecked at São Nicolau, Cape Verde Islands. Her crew were rescued. She was on a voyage from Antwerp to Rio de Janeiro, Brazil and Buenos Aires, Argentina.
George	United Kingdom	The ship was lost off Lossiemouth, Morayshire. She was on a voyage from Banff, Aberdeenshire to London.
Gute Besserung	Rostock	The ship was abandoned in the North Sea. Her crew were rescued by Ludwig ( Greifswald). Gute Besserung was on a voyage from Rostock to London.
Gute Hoffnung	Flag unknown	The ship was driven ashore whilst on a voyage from Riga, Russia to Havre de Grâce, Seine-Inférieure, France. She was later refloated and taken in to Landskrona, Sweden.
Maria	United Kingdom	The ship foundered in the Atlantic Ocean (200 nautical miles (370 km) off the Brazilian coast with the loss of nine lives. Three survivors were rescued. She was on a voyage from Gibraltar to Pernambuco, Brazil.
Newhall	United Kingdom	The ship foundered off Whalsay, Shetland Islands before 4 March. She was on a voyage from Bergen, Norway to Lerwick, Shetland Islands.
Pilot	United Kingdom	The full-rigged ship was abandoned in the Atlantic Ocean on or before 28 March. She was on a voyage from British Honduras to London.
San Francisco de Paula	Spain	The ship was wrecked on the Mayaguana Reef. She was on a voyage from Barcelona to Havana, Cuba.
Tarantula	Spain	The armed full-rigged ship ran aground on the Florida Keys and was consequently captured by Bolivar ( Gran Colombian Navy) and taken in to Key West, Florida Territory.
Tom Pain	(United Kingdom of Great Britain and Ireland) Jamaica	The ship was captured by the privateer Isabella ( Gran Colombia) in late March whilst on a voyage from Jamaica to Havana. She was sent in to Maracaibo but was wrecked in Buff Bay.
Woodhouse	United Kingdom	The ship was wrecked in the Kattegat on the Swedish Coast.
