= Amphitrite (1789 ship) =

History

Great Britain
- Name: Amphitrite
- Namesake: Amphitrite
- Builder: Unknown
- Launched: Unknown
- Fate: Lost 1799

General characteristics
- Tons burthen: 200, or 236 (bm)
- Complement: 25
- Armament: Merchantman: 8 × 6-pounder guns; Slaver: 16 × 6-pounder guns + 4 × 12-pounder carronades

Amphitrite's origins are obscure. She first appeared in Lloyd's Register in 1789. Her entry notes that she had been almost rebuilt in 1783 and had undergone a good repair in 1788, presumably under a different name. From 1789 to 1799 she was a whaler in the British northern whale fishery. She then started on a voyage as a Liverpool-based slave ship in the triangular trade in enslaved people. She capsized off the coast of Africa on her first voyage.

== Career ==
In 1788 the King's Dock opened in Liverpool. On 3 October, the Greenland whaler Amphitrite, Pagan, master, was the first vessel to enter the dock.

Year	Master	Owner	Trade	Source & notes
1789	T.Pagan	Gryson & Co.	Liverpool–Greenland	LR; almost rebuilt 1783, & good repair 1788
1790	J.Pagan; J.Miller	Mason & Co.	Liverpool–Greenland	LR; almost rebuilt 1783, & good repair 1788
1795	J.Miller		Liverpool–Greenland	LR; almost rebuilt 1783, & good repair 1788
1799	Gardner; C__hn	Ross & Co.	Liverpool–Greenland; Liverpool–Africa	LR; almost rebuilt 1783, good repair 1788, & damages repaired 1796
1800	Carnehan	R.Johnson	Liverpool–Africa	LR; almost rebuilt 1783, good repair 1788, & damages repaired 1796

== Enslaving voyage and loss ==
Captain James Cosnahan acquired a letter of marque on 20 March 1799. Cosnachan (or Cosmacher) sailed Amphitrite (or Amphitut) from Liverpool on 16 June, bound for Bonny; she was legally allowed to transport up to 470 captives. In 1799, 156 vessels sailed from British ports bound on enslaving voyages; 134 of the vessels came from Liverpool.

Lloyd's List (LL) reported on 10 January 1800 that Amphitrite, Cochrane, master, had capsized at New Calabar, Africa.

The Trans Atlantic Slave Trade database has Amphitrite being captured. However, there were two Amphitrites of Liverpool that were engaged in gathering captives off the coast of Africa in late 1799, and both were lost. The other was Amphitrite, Adams, master, which by elimination appears to be the one that the French captured.

In 1799, 18 British enslaving ships were lost, five of them on the coast of Africa. During the period 1793 to 1807, war, rather than maritime hazards or resistance by the captives, was the greatest cause of vessel losses among British enslaving vessels.
