= Renown =

Renown may refer to:

- Celebrity, fame and broad public recognition

== Companies ==
- Renown (company), a Japanese clothing brand
- Renown Health, a healthcare network in Nevada, US
- Renown Pictures, a British film company

== Transport ==
=== Ships ===
- Renown (1794 ship), an American whaler
- Renown (German Barque), a 19th-century sailing cargo ship
- Renown-class battlecruiser, two Royal Navy ships of World War I
- HMS Renown, several ships of the Royal Navy

=== Other ===
- AEC Renown, three different bus chassis manufactured by the Associated Equipment Company between 1925 and 1967
- LNWR Renown Class, a series of British steam locomotives 1897–1924
- Triumph Renown, a car manufactured by Triumph 1946–1954
- Wright Renown, a bus manufactured by Wrightbus 1997–2002

== Sport ==
- Renown SC, a Sri Lankan association football club
