= French ship Amphitrite =

Fifteen ships of the French Navy have borne the name Amphitrite, after Amphitrite, a Greek sea goddess.

== Ships named Amphitrite ==
- Amphitrite (1696), a fourth-rank 42/44-gun ship built at Rochefort by the design of Pierre Masson. She was in private service beginning 1698, when she carried a Jesuit mission to Canton under the leadership of Father Joachim Bouvet. She was recommissioned in 1704, and lost to a fire in 1713.
- Amphitrite (1700), a third-rank ship launched October 1700 at Dunkirk as a 50/52. It was later converted to a later 46/48, was renamed Protée in March 1705, and deleted 1722.
- Amphitrite (1744), launched at Bayonne and wrecked 1745, was the lead ship of the class of the same name, a 30-gun design of 1744 by Venard, with 26 × 8-pounder and 4 × 4-pounder guns.
- Amphitrite (1769), a Dédaigneuse-class frigate
- Amphitrite (1780), a corvette
- Amphitrite (1782), a fluyt
- Amphitrite (1801), an aviso
- Milanaise (1803), a 52-gun frigate, bore the name during her career
- Amphitrite (1808), a 44-gun Armide-class frigate, scuttled in 1809 during the British invasion of Martinique.
- Amphitrite (1815), a Pallas-class frigate launched 7 November 1815 at Venice, transferred to the Austrian Navy after that year's annexation of Venice, and renamed Anfitrite and later Augusta.
- Saale (1810), an Armide-class frigate, bore the name during the Bourbon Restoration. She was deleted in 1821.
- Agamemnon (1812), a Téméraire-class seventy-four of the First French Empire, bore the name after she was razéed into a 54-gun frigate during the Bourbon Restoration.
- Amphitrite (1861), a lorcha built in Indochina.
- Amphitrite (1914) was an Amphitrite-class submarine launched in 1914 and struck in 1935.
- Amphitrite (Q159) was a Diane-class submarine launched in 1930 and sunk in 1942.

== Ships with similar names ==
- Amphitrite II a requisitioned trawler.
- Amphitrite II a requisitioned yacht, used as an auxiliary patrol boat.

== See also ==
- HMS Amphitrite
- USS Amphitrite

== Bibliography ==
- Roche, Jean-Michel (2005a). Dictionnaire des bâtiments de la flotte de guerre française de Colbert à nos jours. Vol. 1. Group Retozel-Maury Millau. ISBN 978-2-9525917-0-6. OCLC 165892922.
- Roche, Jean-Michel (2005b). Dictionnaire des bâtiments de la flotte de guerre française de Colbert à nos jours. Vol. 2. Group Retozel-Maury Millau. ISBN 978-2-9525917-0-6. OCLC 165892922.
