= HMS Montagu (1779) =

Ship of the line of the Royal Navy

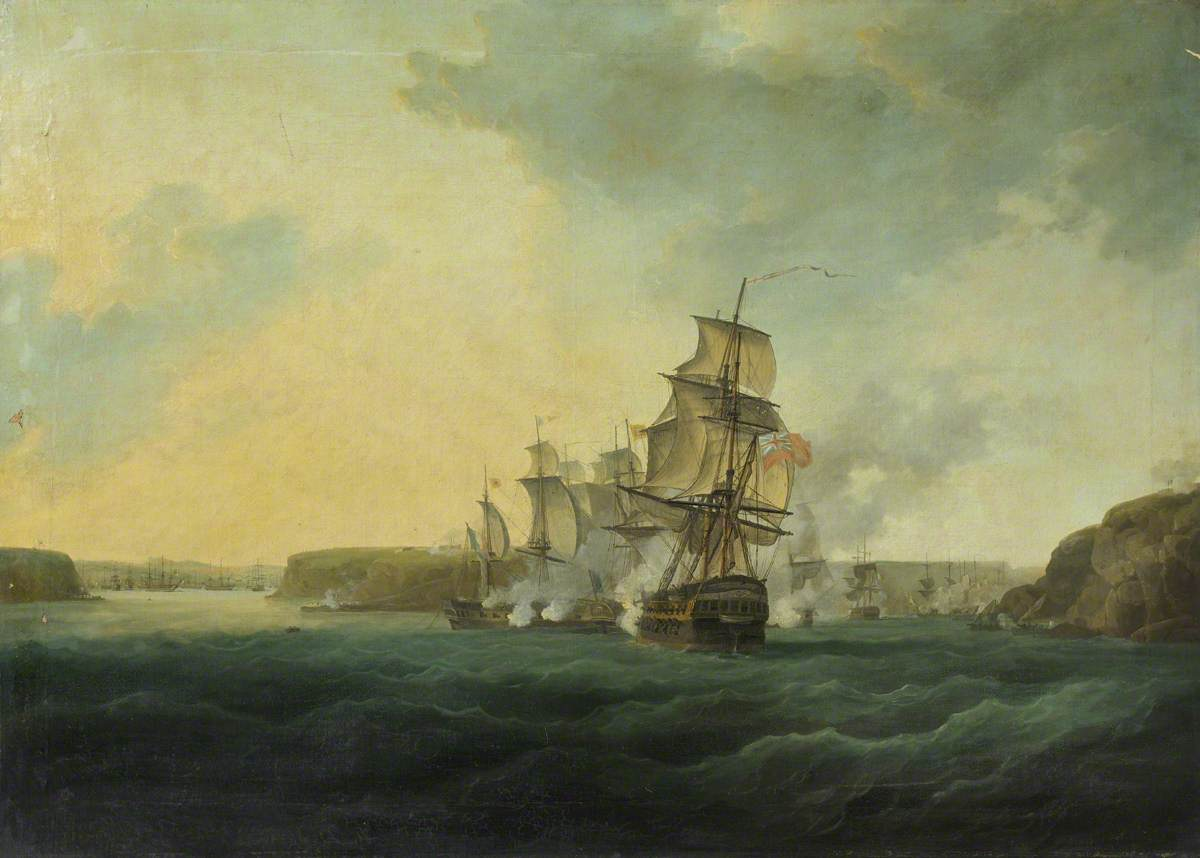
- Montagu forcing the French to move from Bertheaume Bay, 22 August 1800

History

Great Britain
- Name: HMS Montagu
- Ordered: 16 July 1774
- Builder: Chatham Dockyard
- Laid down: 30 January 1775
- Launched: 28 August 1779
- Fate: Broken up, 1818
- Notes: Participated in: Battle of Cape St Vincent; Glorious First of June

General characteristics
- Class & type: Alfred-class ship of the line
- Tons burthen: 1631 (bm)
- Length: 169 ft (51.5 m) (gundeck)
- Beam: 47 ft 2 in (14.4 m)
- Depth of hold: 20 ft (6 m)
- Propulsion: Sails
- Sail plan: Full-rigged ship
- Armament: Gundeck: 28 × 32-pounder guns; Upper gundeck: 28 × 18-pounder guns; QD: 14 × 9-pounder guns; Fc: 4 × 9-pounder guns

HMS Montagu was a 74-gun third rate ship of the line of the Royal Navy, launched on 28 August 1779 at Chatham Dockyard.

Montagu took part in the Battle of Cape St Vincent in 1780 and the Glorious First of June in 1794.

On 30 October 1794 Montagu and Ganges captured the French corvette Jacobine. Jacobine was armed with twenty-four 12-pounder guns, and had a crew of 220 men; she was nine days out of Brest and had taken nothing. The Royal Navy took Jacobine into service as HMS Matilda.

Montagu was driven ashore and damaged at Saint Lucia in the Great Hurricane of 1780 but recovered.

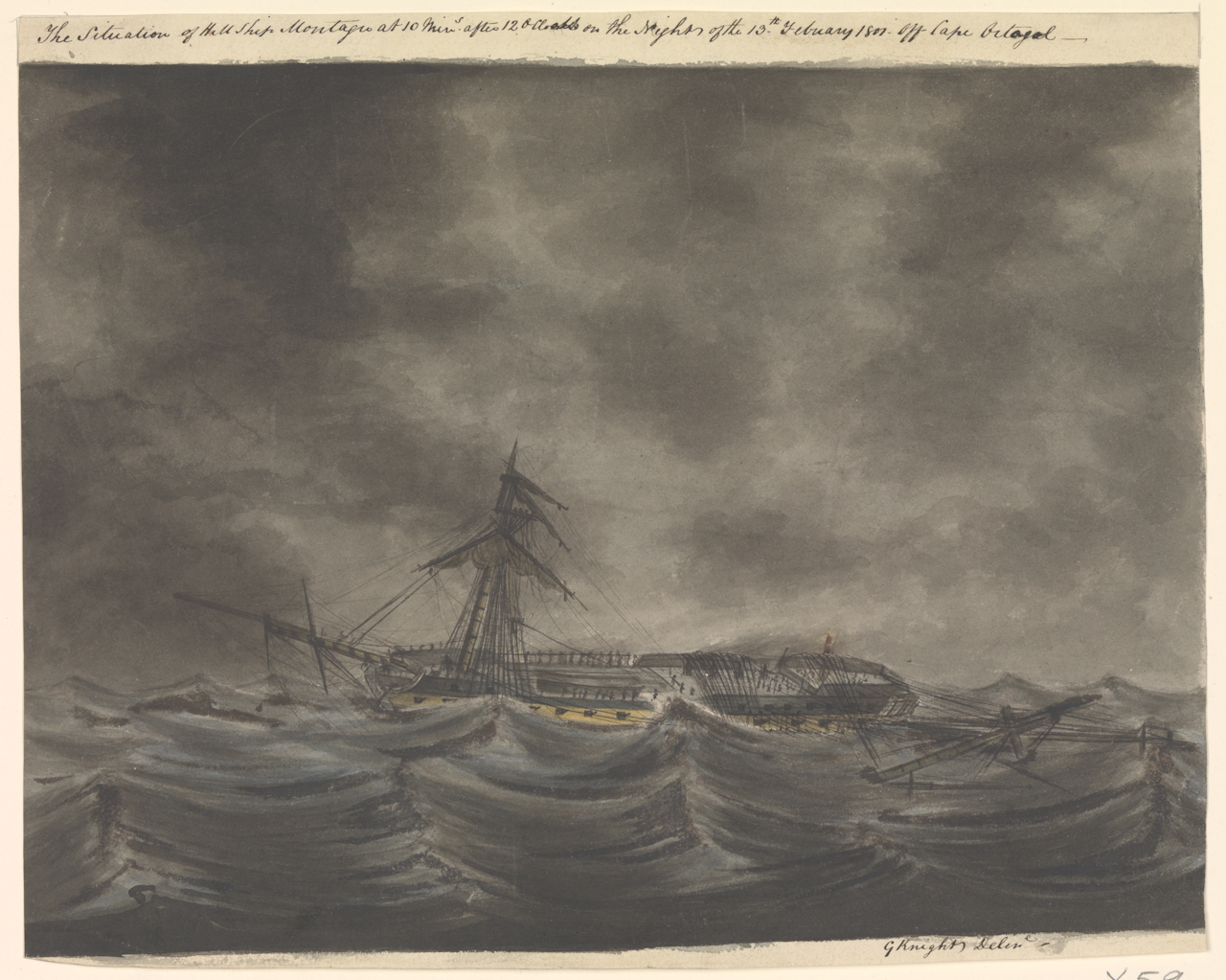
The situation of the Montagu at 10 mins after 12 o'clock on the night of 13 February 1801 off Cape Ortagol

In 1813 Captain Peter Heywood was appointed to command the Montagu in the North Sea and afterwards in the Mediterranean under Lord Exmouth, until July 1816. This was Heywood's last service.

== Fate ==
Montagu was broken up in 1818.
