= Greek submarine Amfitriti =

At least three ships of the Hellenic Navy have borne the name Amfitriti (Greek: Αμφιτρίτη), after the ancient Greek sea goddess Amphitrite:

- Greek submarine Amfitriti (Y-11) a U-class submarine launched as HMS Upstart in 1942 she was renamed on transfer to Greece in 1945. She was returned to the Royal Navy in 1952 and sunk as a target in 1959.
- Greek submarine Amfitriti (S-17) a Gato-class submarine launched as USS Jack in 1942 she was renamed on transfer to Greece in 1958. She was returned to the United States Navy in 1967 and sunk as a target.
- Greek submarine Amfitriti (S-117) a Type 209 submarine commissioned in 1979.
