= Montañés-class ship of the line =

Class overview
- Name: Montañés class
- Operators: Spanish Navy
- Built: 1792–1794
- In commission: 1794–1810
- Completed: 1
- Lost: 1

General characteristics
- Type: Ship of the line
- Tons burthen: 1499 bm
- Length: 155 ft 0 in (47.24 m) (keel); 173 ft 8 in (52.93 m) (gundeck)
- Beam: 46 ft 8 in (14.22 m)
- Draught: 26 ft 7 in (8.10 m) (afore); 23 ft 3 in (7.09 m) (abaft)
- Depth of hold: 23 ft 4 in (7.11 m)
- Propulsion: Sails
- Sail plan: Full-rigged ship
- Complement: 530 (under 1788 regulations)
- Armament: 74 guns

The Montañés class were an intended series of 74-gun ships of the line designed and built between 1792 and 1798 by Julián Martín de Retamosa for the Spanish Navy. However, only the first — the Montañés — was built to this design. Instead, Retamosa replaced this by an entirely new design for a longer 80-gun ship — design to which the Neptuno (1795) and Argonauta (1798) were built.

== Dimensions ==
The dimensions shown in the table to the right are the equivalents in British feet and inches, and in metric units. In the contemporary Spanish units (pies and pulgadas) they were 169.5 pies keel, 190 pies gundeck, 51 pies breadth and 25.5 pies depth in hold.

== Armament ==
The initial armament comprised 28 × 24-pounders on the lower deck, 30 × 18-pounders on the upper deck, 10 × 8-pounders on the quarterdeck and 6 × 8-pounders on the forecastle. The intended complement was 530, including 11 commissioned officers.

== Bibliography ==
- Winfield, Rif; John Tredrea; Enrique Garcia-Torralba Pérez and Manuel Blasco Felip (2023). Spanish Warships in the Age of Sail 1700-1860: Design, Construction, Careers and Fates. Seaforth Publishing, Barnsley. ISBN 978-1-5267-9078-1.
