= HMS Bravo (1794) =

1794 Firm-class floating battery

History

Great Britain
- Name: HMS Bravo
- Ordered: 14 November 1793
- Builder: M/shipwright John Tovery, Woolwich
- Laid down: 3 February 1794
- Launched: 31 May 1794
- Fate: Sold in 1803

General characteristics
- Class & type: Firm-class floating battery
- Tons burthen: 397 6/94 (bm)
- Length: 96 ft 0 in (29.3 m) (overall); 77 ft 8 1/8 in (23.7 m) (keel)
- Beam: 31 ft 4 in (9.6 m)
- Draught: 2 ft 8 in (0.8 m) / 2 ft 11 in (0.9 m)
- Depth of hold: 7 ft 4 in (2.2 m)
- Propulsion: Sails
- Sail plan: Topsail schooner
- Complement: 100
- Armament: 16 × 18-pounder carronades

HMS Bravo was a 16-gun Firm-class floating battery of the Royal Navy, launched in 1794. The two-vessel class was intended to operate in shallow waters. Bravo spent her brief, uneventful service life as the flagship for Commodore Philippe d'Auvergne's flotilla at Jersey. After the Peace of Amiens Bravo was paid off in March 1802; she was sold in 1803.

== Service ==
Sir John Henslow designed the class on the model of flat-bottomed Thames barges. Commander John Dawson commissioned Bravo in June 1794. Commodore d'Auvergne recommissioned her in July for the Jersey-based Channel Islands flotilla, of which he was the commander. In November the Admiralty re-rated Bravo as a sixth rate to give d'Auvergne a salary more commensurate with his rank and role.

Bravo did earn some prize money. She was at Plymouth on 20 January 1795 and so shared in the proceeds of the detention of the Dutch naval vessels, East Indiamen, and other merchant vessels that were in port on the outbreak of war between Britain and the Netherlands.

== Fate ==
Bravo was sold in Jersey in 1803.
