= HMS Amphitrite =

Seven ships of the Royal Navy have borne the name HMS Amphitrite, or HMS Amfitrite, after Amphitrite, a sea goddess of Greek mythology:

- HMS Amphitrite (1778) was a 24-gun sixth rate launched in 1778 and wrecked in 1794.
- HMS Amphitrite was a 28-gun sixth rate launched in 1778 as HMS Pomona (1778). She was renamed Amphitrite in 1795 and was broken up in 1811.
- HMS Amphitrite (1799) was a 40-gun fifth rate captured from the Dutch in 1799. She was renamed Imperieuse in 1801 and was broken up in 1805.
- HMS Amfitrite (1804) was a 38-gun fifth rate captured by HMS Donegal from the Spanish in 1804. She was renamed Blanche in 1805 and was wrecked in 1807.
- HMS Amphitrite (1816) was a fifth rate launched in 1816. She was lent to contractors in 1862 and was broken up in 1875.
- HMS Amphitrite (1898) was a Diadem-class armoured cruiser launched in 1898. She was converted into a minelayer in 1917 and was sold in 1920.

== See also ==
- HM hired armed ship Amphitrite, which served the Royal Navy between 1793 and 1794.
- USS Amphitrite
