= Thetis (1794 Chittagong ship) =

History

Great Britain
- Name: Thetis
- Namesake: Thetis
- Builder: Chittagong
- Launched: September 1794

General characteristics
- Tons burthen: 498, or 502, or 510, or 519, or 550, or 568, or 61979/94 (bm)
- Length: 116 ft 0 in (35.4 m)
- Beam: 31 ft 9 in (9.7 m)
- Notes: Teak-built

Thetis was built at Chittagong in 1794. She made one voyage to England for the British East India Company (EIC) in 1801. She was rebuilt at Calcutta in 1817 and at Moulmein in 1838. She was still sailing out of Calcutta in 1839.

EIC voyage (1801): Captain John Power sailed from Madras on 17 March 1801. Thetis reached the Cape on 17 July and St Helena on 19 August. She arrived at the Downs on 1 November.

Year	Master	Owner	Trade	Source
1801	D.Meintz	Lennox & Co.	London–India	LR

Thetis did not appear on a list of ships built in India that transferred their registry to Great Britain prior to 1814. She did appear in Lloyd's Register (LR).

In 1813, the EIC had lost its monopoly on the trade between India and Britain. Thereafter, British ships were then free to sail to India or the Indian Ocean under a licence from the EIC.

Year	Master	Owner	Trade	Source & notes
1819	J.R.Brown	Hogue & Co.		
1824	J.B.Brown	A.Houge	Liverpool–Calcutta	LR; almost rebuilt 1818
1827	C.F.Davis	Davidson & Co.		
1828	C.F.Davis	Mackintosh & Co.		
1829	J.Masson	Mackintosh & Co.		
