= Amphitrite (1794 ship) =

History

Great Britain
- Name: Amphitrite
- Namesake: Amphitrite
- Builder: Hamburg
- Launched: 1794
- Captured: 1798

General characteristics
- Tons burthen: 237 (bm)

Amphitrite was launched at Hamburg in 1794. She traded primarily between London and Hambro. A French privateer captured her in 1798.

== Career ==
Amphitrite first appeared in Lloyd's Register in 1794 with Sanderman, master and owner, and trade London–Hamburg.

Lloyd's Register for 1798 showed Amphitrite with Sanderman, master and owner, and trade London–Hamburg.

== Fate ==
Lloyd's List reported on 2 November 1798 that a French privateer had captured Amphitrite, Sanderson, master, as Amphitrite was sailing from Hambro to Havana. The privateer sent Amphitrite into Havana.
