= Amphitrite (1791 ship) =

British ship of 1790s, which was hired as an armed vessel by the Royal Navy

History

Great Britain
- Name: Amphitrite
- Namesake: Amphitrite
- Builder: Scarborough
- Launched: 1791
- Fate: Last listed in 1797

General characteristics
- Tons burthen: 327, or 328 (bm)
- Armament: 10 (or 20) × 6-pounder guns

Amphitrite was launched at Scarborough in 1791. In 1793–1794 she served the British Royal Navy as a hired armed vessel. She was last listed in 1797.

== Career ==
Amphitrite first appeared in Lloyd's Register in 1792 with W.Hayes, master, W.Fowler, owner, and trade London–Havre.

Amphitrite served as a hired armed ship for the Royal Navy between 21 April 1793 and 30 October 1794. In January 1793 Lieutenant R.R. Bowyer commissioned the armed sloop Amphitrite for service in the Channel. On 1 December 1793 the armed ship Amphitrite, R.R.Bowyer, commander, was part of a small squadron under Admiral John McBride that sailed to the coasts of Brittany and Normandy with troops under the command of Earl of Moira to create a diversion to help the Royalist cause.

Lloyd's List (LL) reported on 11 March 1794 that the armed ship Amphitrite had brought into the Downs three ships: Margaretha Dorothea, from Altona, Hamburg to Genoa, with wheat; Specs Nova, from Altona with wheat for a market; and Two Brothers, with wine, spirits, etc. A week later, Amphitrite sent the Swedish ship Intrepid, with her cargo of wheat, into the Downs. Three days after that, Lloyd's List reported that Amphitrite had brought into the Downs Margartha Dorothea, Wallis, master, carrying wheat from Dort for the "Streights". These captures aside, Amphitrite spent most of her time escorting convoys in the Channel.

Amphrite was last listed in Lloyd's Register in 1797 with unchanged information since 1792.
