= Amphitrite (1796 ship) =

History

Great Britain
- Name: Amphitrite
- Namesake: Amphitrite
- Launched: 1796, Kingston upon Hull
- Fate: Captured 1799

General characteristics
- Tons burthen: 183, or 194 (bm)
- Complement: 38
- Armament: 1797:4 × 3-pounder guns; 1800: 12 × 12-pounder guns

Amphitrite was launched in 1796 at Kingston upon Hull. She first appeared in Lloyd's Register (LR) in 1797 with S.Barker, master, Atkinson, owner, and trade Hull–Lisbon. Lloyd's Register does not show any change of ownership or master, but the Register of Shipping for 1800 showed her with Adams, master, Forbes, owner, and trade Liverpool–Africa. By another account Amphitute, of 194 tons (bm), George Adams, master, William Forbes & Co., sailed from Liverpool on 17 June 1799 for the Gold Coast, where she intended to purchase 323 slaves. Captain George Adams sailed from Liverpool on 21 July 1799.

In 1799, 156 vessels sailed from British ports bound on slave-trading voyages, 134 of them from Liverpool.

Lloyd's List reported on 4 February 1800 that "the French Squadron" had captured Adriana, Hewitt, master, and Amphitrite, of Liverpool, on the coast of Africa. (Note: The Lloyd's List report was incorrect with respect to Adriana. She completed the voyage to the West Indies and returned to Liverpool. A French privateer did capture her, but that was in 1804 on a later slave-trade voyage.)

In 1799, 18 British slave-trading ships were lost, five of them on the coast of Africa. In 1800, the numbers were 34 and 20, with three vessels captured on their way to Africa. From 1793 to 1807, war, rather than maritime hazards or resistance by the captives, was the greatest cause of vessel losses among British slave ships.
