= HMS Firm (1794) =

Gunvessel of the Royal Navy

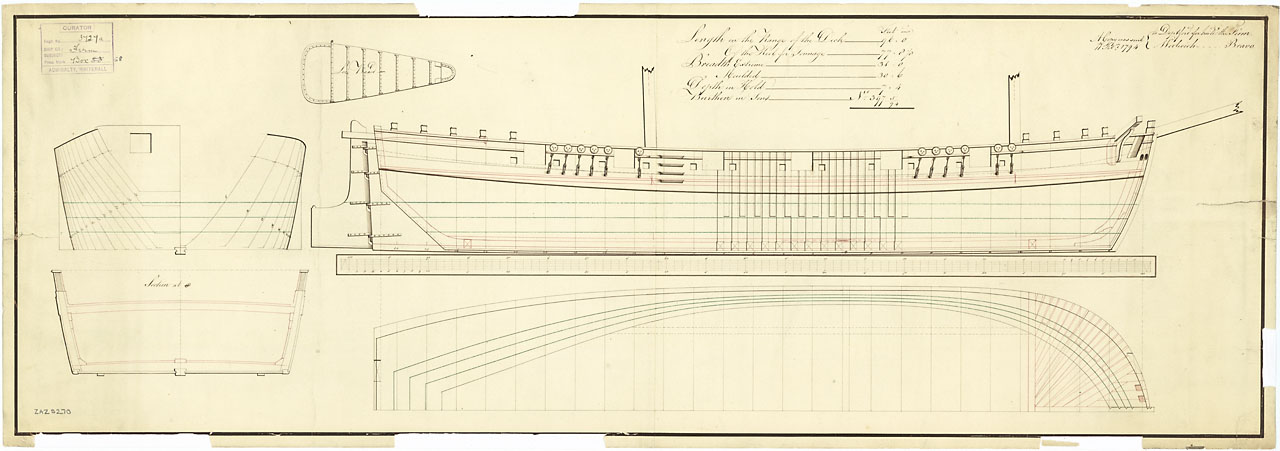
- Drawing of Firm, from the archives of the Royal Museums Greenwich

History

Great Britain
- Name: HMS Firm
- Ordered: 14 November 1793
- Builder: M/shipwright Martin Ware, Deptford
- Laid down: 3 February 1794
- Launched: 31 May 1794
- Fate: Sold in 1803

General characteristics
- Class & type: Firm-class floating battery
- Tons burthen: 3976/94 (bm)
- Length: 96 ft 0 in (29.3 m) (overall); 77 ft 8 1/8 in (23.7 m) (keel)
- Beam: 31 ft 4 in (9.6 m)
- Draught: 2 ft 8 in (0.8 m) / 2 ft 11 in (0.9 m)
- Depth of hold: 7 ft 4 in (2.2 m)
- Propulsion: Sails
- Sail plan: Topsail schooner
- Complement: 100
- Armament: 16 × 18-pounder carronades (Note: A later report gives her armament as consisting of twenty 24-pounder carronades. This is not implausible, but the author has no particular expertise on this issue.)

HMS Firm was a 16-gun Firm-class floating battery of the Royal Navy, launched in 1794. The two-vessel class was intended to operate in shallow waters. After the Peace of Amiens Firm was paid off in March 1802; she was sold in 1803.

== Service ==
Sir John Henslow designed the class on the model of flat-bottomed Thames barges. Commander Temple Hardy commissioned Firm in June 1794. Commander Robert Plampin replaced him in September, for Ostend and Flushing. In August 1795 she came under the command of Commander John Edwards for the Leith station. She was paid off in February 1796 at Sheerness.

Commander Horace Pine recommissioned her in September and she was stationed at Chatham to protect the River Medway. On 2 and 3 June 1797, during the Spithead and Nore mutinies, Firm was at Shellness. The ringleader of the mutiny, Richard Parker, put a man, Thomas Appleyard, aboard her to take command of her. However the crew did not join the mutiny and instead Firm sailed to Sheerness and anchored by the Half Moon Battery and then by the Grain Spit to act against the mutiny if necessary. Appleyard later received a court martial and was hanged aboard Firm, then at Gillingham Reach.

Commander Patrick Campbell replaced Pine in June 1798. (Note: Pine drowned shortly thereafter. He had just taken command of the sloop Scorpion.) On 21 August 1799 Bulkeley Mackworth Praed, newly released from enemy custody, was promoted to Commander on Firm, which served in the Channel. She was at Sheerness from March 1800 on, with Praed remaining with her. In March 1802 she was paid off. Praed received promotion to post captain on 29 April 1802.

== Fate ==
Firm was sold to Mr. F. Hurry for £525 on 30 March 1803.
