= Firm-class floating battery =

Class overview
- Name: Firm
- Operators: Royal Navy
- Succeeded by: Musquito class
- Planned: 2
- Completed: 2
- Retired: 2

General characteristics
- Type: Barge
- Tons burthen: 397 6/94 (bm)
- Length: 96 ft 0 in (29.3 m) (gundeck); 87 ft 8 1/8 in (26.7 m) (keel)
- Beam: 31 ft 0 in (9.4 m)
- Depth of hold: 7 ft 4 in (2.2 m)
- Complement: 100
- Armament: 16 × 18-pounder carronades

The Firm class was a Royal Navy class of two 16-gun floating batteries built to a design by Sir John Henslow, who took as his model the flat-bottomed Thames barge. Both were launched in late 1794 and were sold in 1803.

== Ships ==
- Firm was launched in May 1794 and commissioned in June. She was sold in May 1803.
- Bravo was launched in May 1794 and commissioned in June. She then served in the Jersey flotilla under Commodore Philippe d'Auvergne, Prince de Bouillon. She was paid off in 1802 and sold in Jersey in 1803.
