= Julián Martín de Retamosa =

Spanish naval officer and ship designer (1745–1827)

- Born: 18 March 1745; Cartagena
- Died: 1 February 1827 (aged 81); Madrid
- Military career
- Other work: Naval engineer

Julián Martín de Retamosa (1745–1827) was a Spanish naval officer and a leading ship designer for the Spanish Navy.

== Early career ==
After having served as a lieutenant in the Queen's Dragoon Regiment, by 1769 he had become an ensign in the Spanish Navy and later saw action in the Invasion of Algiers (1775).

He commanded a bomb ketch as part of the fleet commanded by the future captain general of Spain's navy, Marquis of Casa-Tilly to Santa Catarina Island. In 1794 he was promoted to brigadier and put in charge of arsenals and shipyards.

== Battle of Trafalgar ==
Four of the ships built to Martín de Retamosas's design saw action at Trafalgar:

- Príncipe de Asturias (110 guns)
- Montañés (74 guns)
- Neptuno (80 guns)
- Argonauta (80 guns)

In 1807 he was appointed director of the Corps of Naval Engineers.

== Peninsular War ==
With the outbreak of the Peninsular War, he was sent to Cartagena and then on to Seville where, in 1809 he was promoted to lieutenant general and given command of the arsenal at La Carraca. He was appointed to the Supreme Council of the Admiralty in 1814 and in 1818 he was appointed to the Supreme War Council In October that year he was appointed commandant-general, post from which he resigned the following year, being substituted by Fernando Casado de Torres, who would usher in the Age of Steam.
