= Roebuck (1794 ship) =

History

United States
- Name: Roebuck
- Namesake: Male roe deer
- Builder: New England
- Launched: 1794
- Fate: Last listed 1797

General characteristics
- Tons burthen: 186 (bm)

Roebuck was an American merchantmen built in New England in 1794. In 1795 she made one voyage as a slave ship, sailing to Liverpool, then to Sierra Leone and finally Havana. Afterwards, she returned to the United States.

== Career ==
Roebuck, Cotterel, master, arrived at Gravesend from Charleston on 6 October 1795. She first appeared in Lloyd's Register in 1795.

Year	Master	Owner	Trade	Source
1795	R.Cottle	S.Hughes	London–Charleston	LR; American ownership
1796	R.Cottle; J.A.Delano	S.Hughes	London–Charleston; Liverpool–Africa	LR; American owned; repairs 1796

Captain Delano sailed from Liverpool on 24 June 1796. Roebuck gathered slaves at Sierra Leone and then at Cape Grand Mount. She arrived at Havana in June 1797 with 98 slaves.

There was a report in Lloyd's List (LL) that Roebuck, Delano, master, had been taken off the coast of Africa and since lost, together with her tender.

That was an error as the next mention in LL showed Roebuck, Delano, master, arriving in Barbadoes, from Africa. The mention after that showed them arriving at Havana from St Croix. (Note: The mistake reappeared in the literature on the profitability of the trans-Atlantic slave trade.)

Roebuck arrived at Havana in June 1797 with 98 slaves. At some point Robert Hume replaced J. Delano as master. Roebuck, Hume, master, arrived in London on 5 October 1797, having passed the Isle of Wight in some distress. A second report had her first arriving at Dover from Savannah after having been detained by a sloop of war.

Roebuck was last listed in LL in 1797 with data unchanged since 1796.
