= HMS Matilda (1794) =

History

France
- Name: Bonheur
- Builder: Louis & Antoine Crucy and Jean Baudet, Basse-Indre
- Laid down: June 1793
- Launched: 30 March 1794
- Renamed: Jacobine (November 1793)
- Fate: Captured October 1794

Great Britain
- Name: HMS Matilda
- Acquired: By capture 30 October 1794
- Fate: Broken up August 1810

General characteristics
- Tons burthen: 573 (bm)
- Length: 129 ft 3 in (39.4 m) (overall); 105 ft 5 in (32.1 m) (keel)
- Beam: 32 ft 10 in (10.0 m)
- Depth of hold: 9 ft 10 in (3.0 m)
- Complement: French service:223; British service:180
- Armament: French service:22 × 12-pounder guns; British service:28 × 8-pounder guns

HMS Matilda was the French corvette Jacobine (or Jacobin), which was launched in March 1794 and which the British captured in the West Indies seven months later. Matilda served in the West Indies until 1799, capturing six small privateers. In 1799 she sailed to Woolwich where she became a hospital ship. Between 1805 and 1807 she was the flagship of Rear-Admiral Henry Stanhope. She was broken up in 1810.

== Origins ==
Jacobine was originally named Bonheur, but received the name change before she was launched. She was built to a one-off design by Pierre Degay.

Jacobine was under the command of lieutenant de vaisseau Dalbarde from 3 April 1794 until 13 September 1794. She initially was stationed at Nantes. She then sailed from Mindin (opposite Saint-Nazaire), to Brest. From there she made a patrol in the Atlantic, returning to Brest. Her next commander was lieutenant de vaisseau Dandicolle.

== Capture ==
HMS Ganges and Montagu captured Jacobine. She was armed with twenty-four 12-pounder guns, and had a crew of 220 men; she was nine days out of Brest and had taken nothing. The capture took place on 31 October 1794, about 30 leagues west of Cape Finisterre. Ganges and Montague were sailing to the West Indies and took Jacobine with them.

== Career ==
The Royal Navy in July 1795 commissioned Matilda under Commander George Vaughan. (Because she was a sixth rate she would normally be a post captain's command, and Vaughan indeed received the requisite promotion in November.) In fact, Matilda was already in service by July.

Vice-Admiral Benjamin Caldwell, the commander-in-chief of the Barbados and Leeward Islands station had stationed her off Basseterre, Guadeloupe. She joined up with him at Saint-Pierre, Martinique, on 29 June with the report that the day before she had seen a French squadron of nine ships, three of them large frigates. They had chased him off, and sailed into the port.

She had also qualified to share in the proceeds of the capture of Saint Lucia in 25 May by the naval forces under Admiral Hugh Cloberry Christian and troops under Lieutenant-General Sir Ralph Abercromby.

In December Captain Captain Robert Otway replaced Vaughan. In May 1796 Captain Henry Mitford replaced Otway.

On 13 February 1797 Matilda captured a French navy schooner of two guns and 38 men. The capture took place off Barbados and Captain Mitford sent the schooner into port there.

At some point between 25 July and 5 October, Matilda detained the sloop Mary, of 104 tons (bm) and ten men, of Saint Thomas. She was sailing from Saint Thomas to Suriname. She was carrying cash and dry goods, had a crew of Frenchmen, and had false invoices.

On 14 January 1798, Mitford and Matilda arrived at English Harbour, Antigua. There Mitford arrested Thomas Pitt, Lieutenant Lord Camelford, of Favourite. He had shot and killed Lieutenant Charles Peterson, was in command of Perdrix. Both vessels were in the harbour undergoing refit when they got into a dispute over who was the senior commander. Camelford accused Paterson of mutiny, and shot him. The two ships' companies came close to firing on each other. The subsequent court martial acquitted Camelford. (Note: Pitt was a cousin of the then Prime Minister, William Pitt. Also, with the Spithead and Nore mutinies of 1797 fresh in everyone's mind, the Navy may have been sensitive on the issue of mutiny. When Camelford died in a duel in 1804, apparently few people regretted his demise.)

On 19 January Matilda captured the French privateer ship Ceres off Antigua. Ceres was pierced for 14 guns but only carried two. She had a crew of 45 men, and was sailing from Saint Bartholomew's to Guadeloupe to complete her fitting-out. She was carrying a cargo of pitch and tar. (Note: Céres was originally a privateer commissioned in 1798 in Dunkirk under Georges-Louis Maurancourt, with 110 men and 14 guns.)

Matilda was still north of Antigua when on 29 and 31 March she captured two privateers. On 29 March she captured the sloop Vautour, of 10 guns and 64 men. (Note: Vautour was a privateer from Bordeaux commissioned in July 1797 (or possibly July 1797), under a Captain Bolle.) Then two days later, Matilda captured the brig Aigle, of 12 guns and 86 men. (Note: Aigle had been commissioned in March 1797 and had cruised off Lorient.) Matilda also captured the privateer Maria, of two guns and 24 men. She sent all three into Antigua.

The waters off Antigua continued to be productive for Matilda. On 29 June she captured Annibale, of 14 guns and 97 men. (Note: Annibale had been commissioned in Guadeloupe in November 1797.) Then on 23 June Matilda captured Etoile, of six guns 53 men. (Note: Etoile, 70-tons (of load), was a privateer commissioned in Nantes in October 1797 under Jacques Auger, with 98 men and 10 guns (two 8-pounders and eight 4-pounders). She sailed under the command of Captain Chauveau from December 1797 to March 1798.)

The arrival of an Admiralty Order dated 27 June 1798 confirmed the commissioning of Matilda, and the name change from Jacobine.

Matilda's last capture took place on 5 October, again off Antigua. The captured privateer was Intrepid, of 14 guns and 74 men. She was three days out of Guadeloupe and had not yet taken anything.

Matilda sailed for England and arrived at Woolwich on 15 October 1799. There she was hulked and became a hospital ship under the command of a succession of lieutenants. From December her commander was William Lanyon who served until January 1801. In May 1803, Lieutenant J. James recommissioned her. His replacement in August 1804 was Thomas D. Birchall, who served until 1807.

Between 1805 and 1807, Matilda was also the flagship for Rear-Admiral Henry Stanhope.

== Fate ==
Matilda was broken up in 1810.
