= Royalist (1794 ship) =

Ship

History

Great Britain
- Name: Royalist
- Launched: 1794, Sunderland
- Fate: Foundered 15 April 1814

General characteristics
- Tons burthen: 424, or 426 (bm)
- Armament: 1810: 10 × 6–pounder guns; 1813: 10 × 6–pounder + 2 × 12–pounder guns

Royalist was a ship launched in 1794 from Sunderland. She was a general trader ship until 1812 when she became a whaler in the northern whale fishery. She was lost in April 1814 while whaling in the Davis Strait.

== Career ==
Royalist first appeared in Lloyd's Register (LR) in 1795 with Robert Finley, master, H.Rudd, owner, and trade London–Hamburg.

Year	Master	Owner	Trade	Source
1800	J.Wray	Schoffield	Hull–Petersburg	LR
1805	F.Walton	Schoffield	Cork	LR; damages repaired 1801
1810	Walton	Schofield	Hull–Baltic	Register of Shipping
1812	J.Atkin; Edmonds	Heseltine	Hull–Quebec	LR; rebuilt 1810
1813	A.Edmonds	Gibson & Co.	Hull–Davis Strait	LR; rebuilt 1810 & damages repaired 1812

In 1812 Royalist became a Northern Whale Fishery whaler. The following data is from Coltish:

Year	Master	Where	Whales	Tuns whale oil
1812	Edmonds		6	93
1813	Edmonds	Davis Strait	0	0
1814	Edmonds	Greenland	0	0

== Fate ==
Lloyd's List (LL) reported in August 1814 that Royalist had foundered in the Davis Strait with the loss of all hands. There had been 54 crew members on board.

It was believed that she had foundered at 61°30′N 59°00′W. Three years later one of her casks washed ashore at Hoy Sound.

Captain Benet, of Venerable had been in company before Royalist was lost. At 8 am on the 14th, they fell in with drift ice. A gale of 12 hours' duration developed, followed by a tremendous storm of 20 hours' duration. Royalist and Venerable separated; Captain Bennet believed that she had been lost to windward of some icebergs.
