= Amphitrite (1802 ship) =

UK merchant ship and convict transport 1802–1833

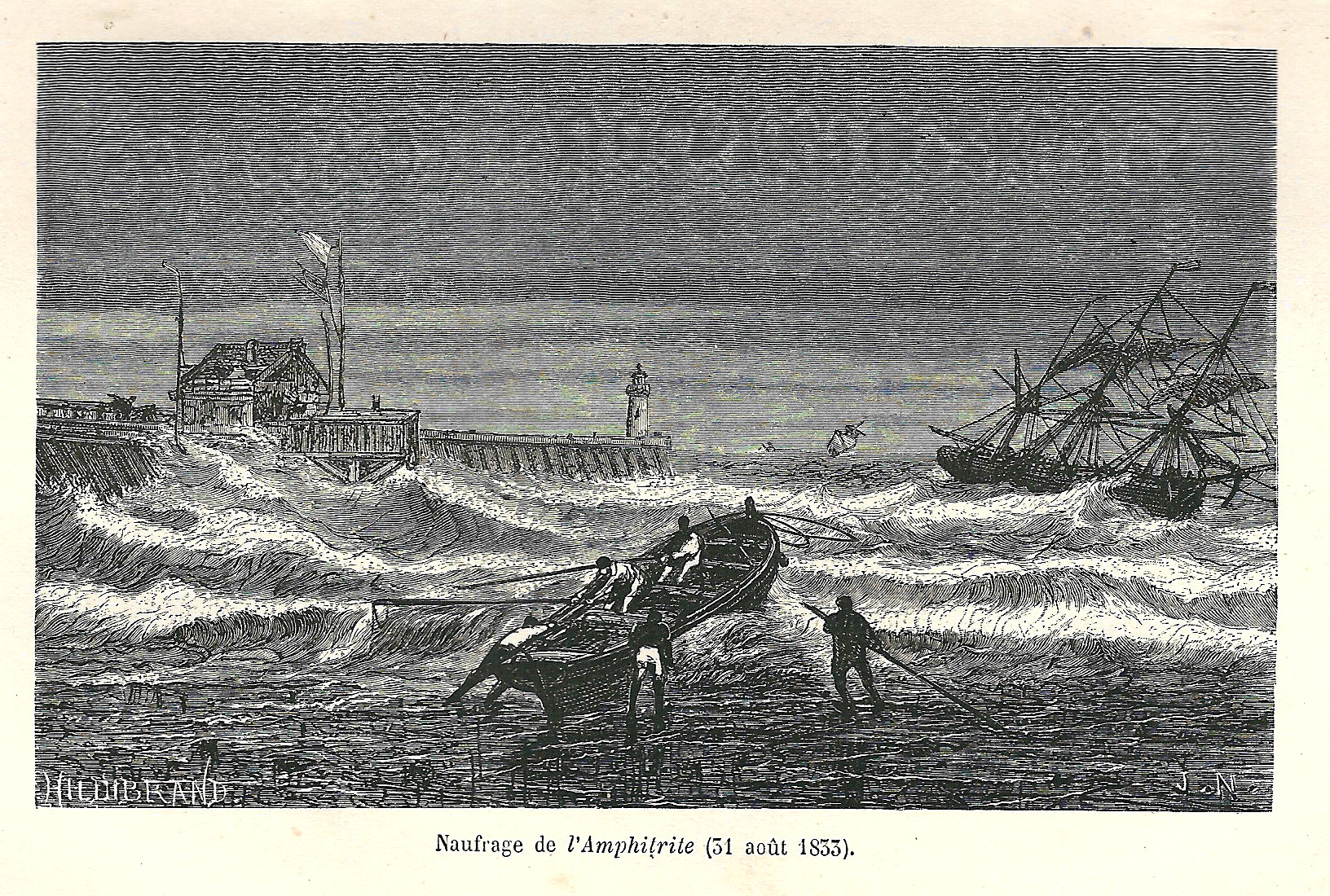
- Wreck of Amphitrite, engraving by Jules Noël, 1877.

History

United Kingdom
- Name: Amphitrite
- Namesake: Amphitrite
- Builder: Appledore, Torridge, or Bideford
- Launched: 1802
- Fate: Wrecked 1833 (50.7833°N 1.5667°E)

General characteristics
- Tons burthen: 1802:150 or 156 (bm); 1824:208 or 209 (bm; after lengthening)
- Propulsion: Sail
- Complement: 16 (at loss)

Amphitrite was built at Appledore, Torridge (also recorded as Bideford), and launched in 1802. Under various owners and masters she traded across the North Atlantic and to the Baltic. She was wrecked in 1833 with heavy loss of life while transporting female convicts to New South Wales.

== Career ==
Sources disagree on Amphitrite's year of launch. Lloyd's Register and the Register of Shipping in various volumes report it as 1802, 1804, or even 1816. However, Amphitrite appears in Lloyd's Register in 1802 with R. Hogg as master and Hogg & Co. as owner. Her trade is given as Cork.

The data in the table below comes from the Register of Shipping.

Year	Master	Owner	Trade	Notes
1805	W. Osborne	Hogg & co.	Plymouth–London	
1810	S.Colburn	Keats & Co.	London–Halifax, Nova Scotia	
1815	Ferguson	Liddell	Greenock–Pictou	
1820	Hindoston	Liddell	Greenock–Pictou	
1825	Henderson	Liddell & Co.	Greenock–St Petersburg	Repairs 1822
1830	Murray	Lyall & Co.	London transport	Lengthened 1824

=== Incidents ===
On 12 January 1808 Amphitrite, Colburn, master, was driven onshore at Ryde, but was gotten off without damage.

On 21 October 1808 as Amphitrite was sailing from Halifax to Bedec, New Brunswick, and London, she was driven on shore near Pictou, Nova Scotia. She was gotten off on 6 November, but then grounded again near Bedec. Her crew was saved.

On 28 October 1814 Amphitrite, Ferguson, master, was sailing from to Petersburgh to Glasgow when she got on shore at Gothland. It was expected that she would be got off. A report a week later stated that she had been gotten off and taken into Grangemouth.

The Register of Shipping for 1833 (published in 1832), shows Amphitrite with R. Murray, master, Lyall & Co., owner, and trade Portsmouth transport, changing to London–New South Wales.

== Loss ==
Captain John Hunter sailed Amphitrite from Woolwich, Kent, England on 25 August 1833, bound for New South Wales. She had embarked 108 female convicts and 12 children.

While sailing off Boulogne, Pas-de-Calais, France she encountered a gale that blew her ashore on 31 August. Hunter refused offers of aid from the shore, due to his concern that if the prisoners got on shore some might escape, and his belief that a rising tide would free her. The ship subsequently broke up with the loss of 133 lives; only three crewmen survived.

== General references ==
- Bateson, Charles (1959). The Convict Ships, 1787-1868. Brown, Son & Ferguson. OCLC 3778075.
