= Renown (1794 ship) =

History

United States
- Name: Renown
- Owner: Tristram & Zaccheus Hussey (1797)
- Builder: New Bedford, Massachusetts
- Launched: 1794
- Fate: Captured c.1813

United Kingdom
- Name: Adam
- Owner: 1814:Bridges & Co.; 1815:Rains & Co.; 1815:Coxshot; 1825:Lyddeker & Co.
- Acquired: c.1813 by purchase of a prize
- Fate: Wrecked at Deal in 1825

General characteristics
- Tons burthen: 241, or 242, or 280 (bm)
- Propulsion: Sail
- Armament: 6 × 12-pounder carronades

Renown was launched in 1794 at New Bedford, Massachusetts. She made four voyages from Nantucket as a whaler. In 1813, while she was on her fifth American whaling voyage, she became the first American whaler that British whalers captured in the South Seas. She was sold in London and under the name Adam became first a London-based transport and then a whaler in the British southern whale fishery. She made four whaling voyages and was wrecked in 1825 at the outset of her fifth British whaling voyage.

== American whaler ==
Renown's service prior to 1797 is currently obscure.

=== 1st whaling voyage (1797–1799) ===
Captain Alpheus Coffin sailed Renown in 1797 from Nantucket on her first whaling voyage. She was bound for Brazil and the Pacific. On 29 November 1797 she stopped at Desterro for provisions, refreshment, water, and wood. She received permission to stay for 10 days. Coffin returned to Nantucket in 1799 with 1250 barrels of sperm oil and 150 barrels of whale oil.

=== 2nd whaling voyage (1801–1802) ===
Captain Thaddeus Coffin sailed from Nantucket in 1801, bound for Brazil and the Pacific. In May Renown was at Valparaiso. She returned on 26 November 1802 with 500 barrels of sperm oil.

=== 3rd whaling voyage (1803–1805) ===
Captain Alpheus Coffin sailed from Nantucket in 1803, bound for the Pacific. Renown returned on 3 November 1805 with 1250 barrels of sperm oil.

=== 4th whaling voyage (1810–1811) ===
A master, whose name is currently unknown, sailed Renown from Nantucket in 1810 and returned in March 1811.

=== 5th whaling voyage (1811–1813) ===
Captain Zaccheus Barnard sailed from Nantucket on 4 August 1811. A British letter of marque whaler captured Renown in 1813. At the time she had 1637 barrels of sperm oil.

=== Capture ===
Renown was the first American whaler captured in the South Seas during the War of 1812. Her captors put her crew ashore at Massafuero (Más Afuera) Island. The Nantucket whalers Perseveranda and Sukey later rescued the crew. (Note: Sukey, John Macy, master, and Perseveranda, Thomas Paddack, master, had both sailed from Nantucket in 1811. The British captured Sukey off the Virginia coast as she was returning from the South Seas. The British captured Perseveranda off Nantucket as she returned home in 1813. Perseranda, of 242 tons (bm), had been launched in 1795 at Hingham, Massachusetts. She was returning from her sixth whaling voyage.)

== British whaler ==
On 20 November 1813 the prize Renown arrived at Gravesend from the South Seas.

New owners renamed Renown Adam. She first entered Lloyd's Register in 1814 with Hannibal master, Bridges & Co., owner, and trade London transport. The Register of Shipping for 1815 showed her with Honeybel, master, Rains, owner, and trade London transport.

On 20 March 1814 the transport Adam arrived at Gibraltar from Portsmouth. On 1 December, Adam, Hannibal, master, was at Deal, bound for Bermuda. On 30 May 1815 the transport Adam arrived at Portsmouth from Havana.

=== 1st whaling/sealing voyage (1815–1818) ===
Captain Simeon Coleman sailed from London on 14 December 1815, bound for the Pacific. Adam was at Portsmouth on 6 January 1816, and St Jago on 5 February. She returned to Rio de Janeiro on 18 April 1818 from Peru, and London from Rio and the South Seas on 31 July 1818 with 500 casks of oil and 2250 skins.

=== 2nd whaling voyage (1819–1820) ===
Captain Foster sailed from Gravesend on 7 April 1819, bound for the South Seas. Adam returned on 8 December 1820.

=== 3rd whaling voyage (1821–1822) ===
Captain Coffin sailed from Gravesend on 11 February 1821, bound for the South Seas. On 26 March she was at 3°30′N 20°43′W. (Note: The coordinates reported in Lloyd's List put Adam in the middle of what is today Algeria. Swapping East for West, and increasing the degrees by an order of magnitude puts her in the Atlantic, well off the coast of West Africa.) On 22 July she was at Woolwich Bay with 38 tons of oil. By October or so she was at 26°N 30°W with 80 tons of oil. On 26 December Adam was at St Helena. She left on 3 January 1822, southward bound. Between 29 February and 8 March 1822 she was at Saint Helena. She then sailed for the Brazil Banks. She left the Brazil Banks on 29 April. Adam returned to England on 19 July 1822 with 400 casks of oil.

=== 4th whaling voyage (1822–1824) ===
Captain Coffin was at Deal on 26 August 1822, bound for the South Seas. She sailed on 1 September from Deal and on 12 September from Portsmouth. Adam returned on 17 June 1824 with 270 casks of oil, plus fins (baleen).

== Fate ==
The Register of Shipping for 1826 showed Adam with Rozier, master, Lyddeker, owner, and trade London–South Seas. On 1 March 1825, a gale developed at Deal. Adam, Razier, master, returned from off Folkestone and attempted to anchor but the crew lost one cable and was unable to clear her chain. She was driven on shore and bilged. She had been sailing from London, bound for the South Seas. She had set out on 20 February.
