= USS Amphitrite =

USS Amphitrite has been the name of more than one United States Navy ship, and may refer to:

- USS Tonawanda (1864), a monitor in commission in 1865 and from 1866 to 1872, renamed USS Amphitrite in 1869
- USS Amphitrite (BM-2), a monitor in commission from 1895 to 1901, from 1902 to 1907, and from 1910 to 1919
- USS Amphitrite (ARL-29), a landing craft repair ship in commission from 1945 to 1947

These ships were named after Amphitrite, a Greek sea goddess and wife of Poseidon.
