= Amphitrite =

Queen of the sea and wife of Poseidon in Greek mythology

- Queen of the sea; Goddess of the sea
- Member of the Nereids
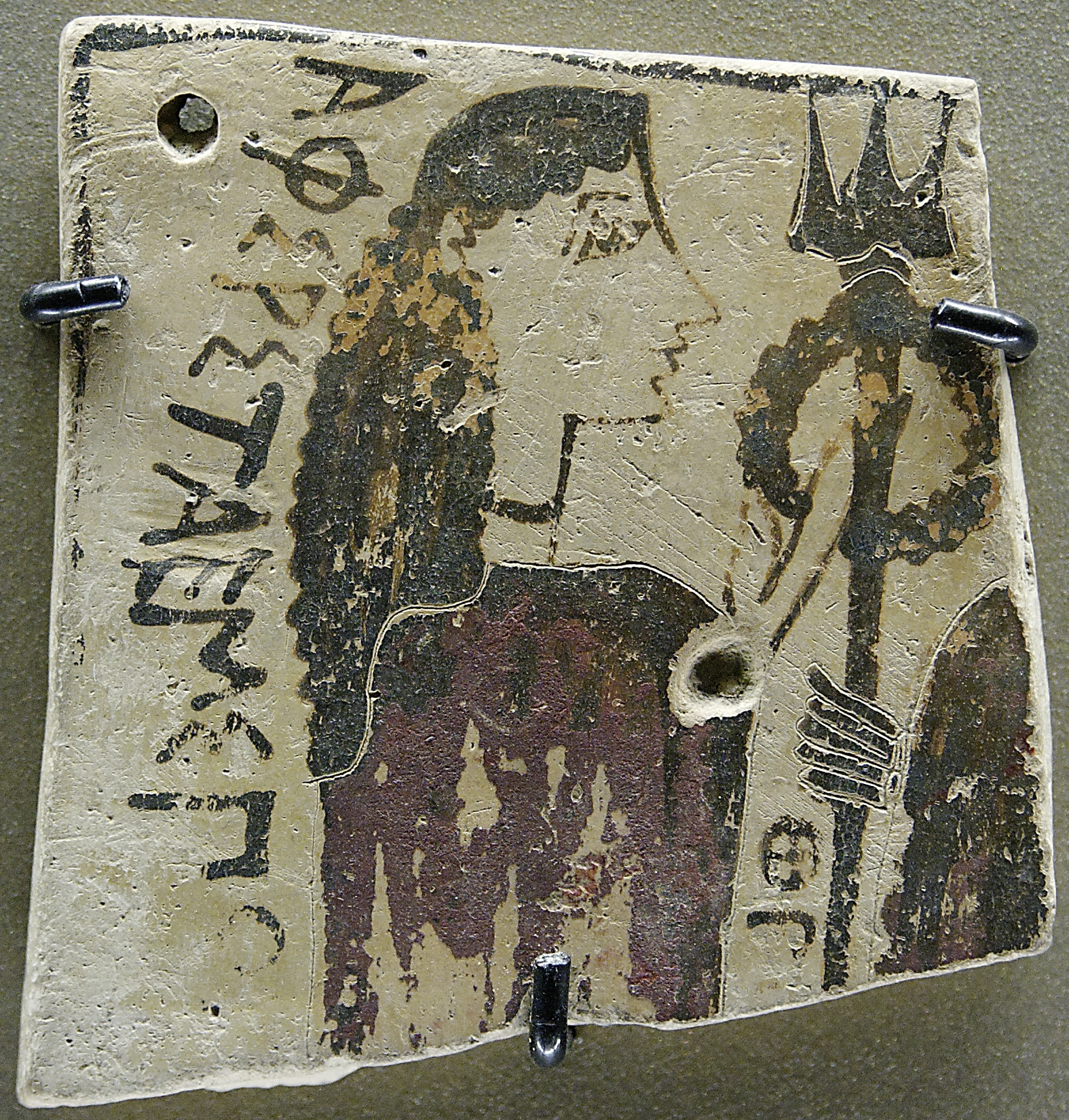
- Amphitrite ("Aphirita") bearing a trident on a pinax from Corinth (575–550 BC).
- Abode: Mount Olympus, or the sea
- Symbol: Trident, dolphin, seal

Genealogy
- Parents: Nereus and Doris, or Oceanus and Tethys
- Siblings: Nerites and the Nereids or the river gods and the Oceanids
- Consort: Poseidon
- Children: Triton, Rhodos, Benthesikyme, Kymopoleia

In ancient Greek mythology, Amphitrite (/æmfɪˈtraɪtiː/; Ancient Greek: Ἀμφιτρίτη, romanized: Amphitrítē) was the goddess of the sea, the queen of the sea, and her consort is Poseidon. She was a daughter of Nereus and Doris (or Oceanus and Tethys). Under the influence of the Olympian pantheon, she became the consort of Poseidon and was later used as a symbolic representation of the sea. Her Roman counterpart is Salacia, a comparatively minor figure, and the goddess of saltwater.

== Name ==
Her name, pronounced [am.pʰi.trǐː.tɛː] in Ancient Greek and /ˌæm.fɪˈtraɪ.ti/ in English, comes from the prefix αμφι- (amphi-, 'on both sides') and τρίτη (tritē, 'the third,' fem. sg.). The dialectical variation 'Aphirita' (Ἀφιρίτα) is also found on a 6th-century-BC pinax. Other sources view the names as being Pre-Greek. The element trit may be a Pre-Greek word for the sea, as seen in her son's name Triton and Lake Tritonis in Africa.

== Family ==
According to Hesiod's Theogony, Amphitrite was one of the 50 Nereid daughters of Nereus and Doris. The mythographer Apollodorus, however, lists her among both the Nereids, as well as the Oceanids, the daughters of Oceanus and Tethys.

Amphitrite's offspring included seals and dolphins. She also bred sea monsters and her great waves crashed against the rocks, putting sailors at risk. Poseidon and Amphitrite had a son, Triton, who was a merman, and a daughter, Rhodos (if this Rhodos was not actually fathered by Poseidon on Halia or was not the daughter of Asopus as others claim). According to the mythographer Apollodorus, Benthesikyme was the daughter of Poseidon and Amphitrite.

== Mythology ==
When Poseidon desired to marry her, Amphitrite, wanting to protect her virginity, fled to the Atlas Mountains. Poseidon sent many creatures to find her. A dolphin came across Amphitrite and convinced her to marry Poseidon. As a reward for the dolphin's help, Poseidon created the Delphinus constellation.

Eustathius said that Poseidon first saw her dancing at Naxos among the other Nereids, and carried her off. But in another version of the myth, she fled from his advances to Atlas, at the farthest ends of the sea; there the dolphin of Poseidon sought her through the islands of the sea, and finding her, spoke persuasively on behalf of Poseidon, if we may believe Hyginus and was rewarded by being placed among the stars as the constellation Delphinus.

Amphitrite is not fully personified in the Homeric epics: "out on the open sea, in Amphitrite's breakers" (Odyssey iii.101), "moaning Amphitrite" nourishes fishes "in numbers past all counting" (Odyssey xii.119). She shares her Homeric epithet Halosydne (Ancient Greek: Ἁλοσύδνη, romanized: Halosúdnē, lit. 'sea-nourished') with Thetis. In some sense, the sea-nymphs are doublets.

Pindar, in his sixth Olympian Ode, recognized Poseidon's role as "great god of the sea, husband of Amphitrite, goddess of the golden spindle." For later poets, Amphitrite became simply a metaphor for the sea: Euripides, in Cyclops (702) and Ovid, Metamorphoses, (i.14).

== Representation and cult ==
Though Amphitrite does not figure in Greek cultus, at an archaic stage she was of outstanding importance, for in the Homeric Hymn to Delian Apollo, she appears at the birthing of Apollo among, in Hugh G. Evelyn-White's translation, "all the chiefest of the goddesses, Dione and Rhea and Ichnaea and Themis and loud-moaning Amphitrite"; more recent translators are unanimous in rendering "Ichnaean Themis" rather than treating "Ichnae" as a separate identity. Theseus in the submarine halls of his father Poseidon saw the daughters of Nereus dancing with liquid feet, and "august, ox-eyed Amphitrite", who wreathed him with her wedding wreath, according to a fragment of Bacchylides. Jane Ellen Harrison recognized in the poetic treatment an authentic echo of Amphitrite's early importance: "It would have been much simpler for Poseidon to recognize his own son… the myth belongs to that early stratum of mythology when Poseidon was not yet god of the sea, or, at least, no-wise supreme there—Amphitrite and the Nereids ruled there, with their servants the Tritons. Even so late as the Iliad Amphitrite is not yet 'Neptuni uxor' [Neptune's wife]."

Amphitrite, "the third one who encircles [the sea]", was so entirely confined in her authority to the sea and the creatures in it that she was almost never associated with her husband, either for purposes of worship or in works of art, except when he was to be distinctly regarded as the god who controlled the sea. An exception may be the cult image of Amphitrite that Pausanias saw in the temple of Poseidon at the Isthmus of Corinth (ii.1.7).

In the arts of vase-painting and mosaic, Amphitrite was distinguishable from the other Nereids only by her queenly attributes. In works of art, both ancient ones and post-Renaissance paintings, Amphitrite is represented either enthroned beside Poseidon or driving with him in a chariot drawn by sea-horses (hippocamps) or other fabulous creatures of the deep, and attended by Tritons and Nereids. She is dressed in queenly robes and has nets in her hair. The pincers of a crab are sometimes shown attached to her temples.

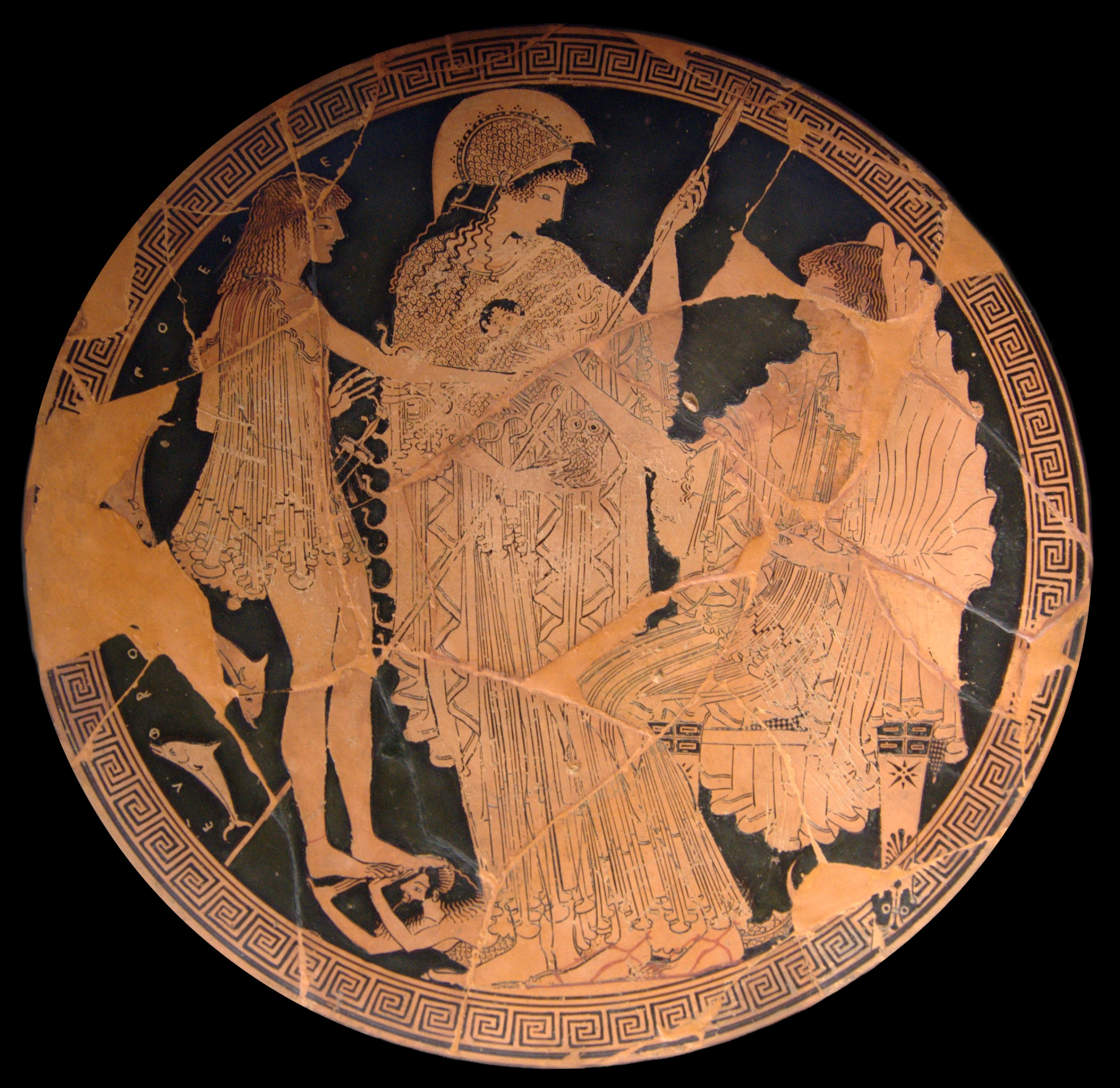
Theseus and Amphitrite clasp hands, with Athena looking on (red-figure cup by Euphronios and Onesimos, 500–490 BC)

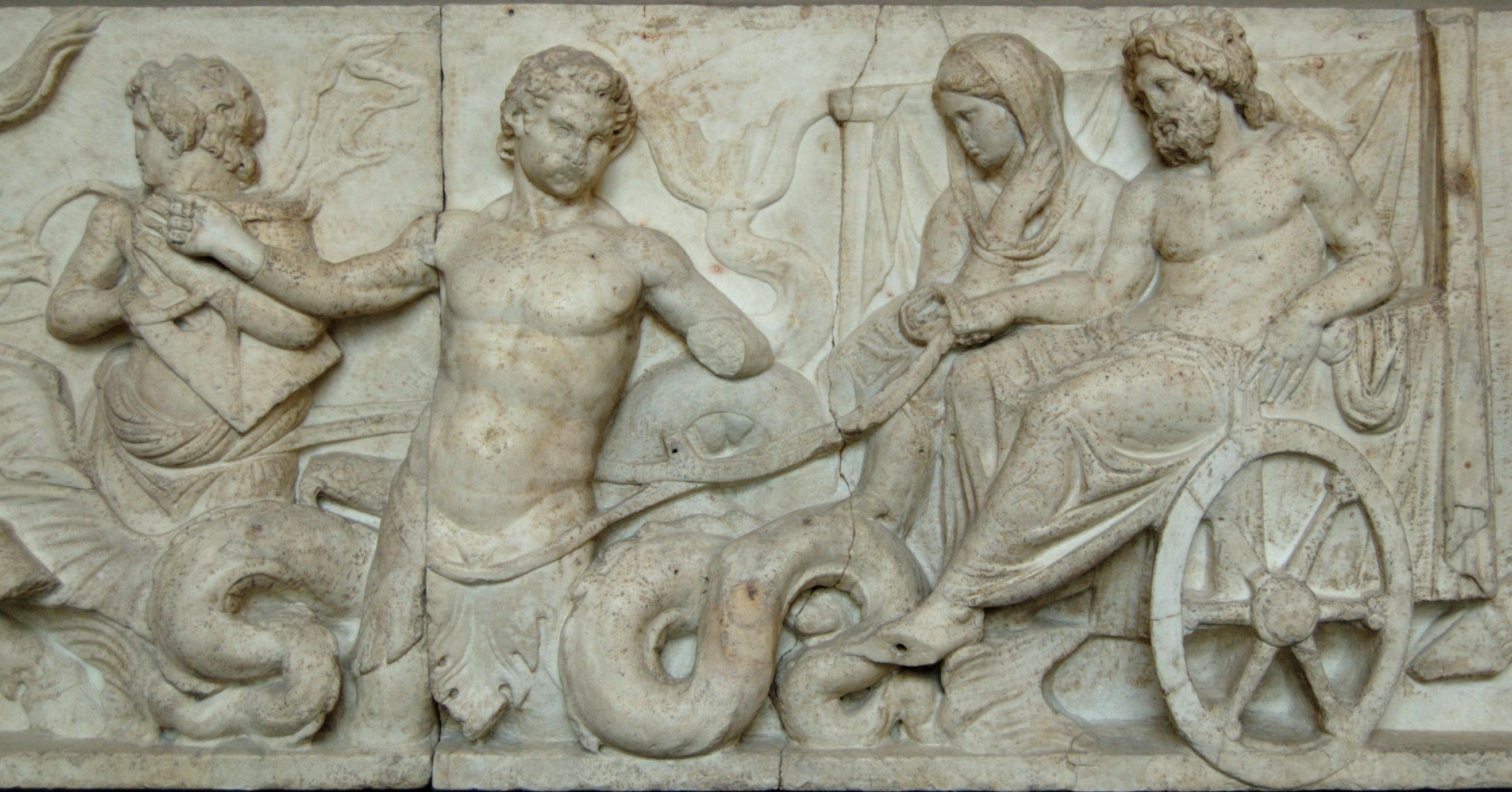
Sea thiasos depicting the wedding of Poseidon and Amphitrite, from the Altar of Domitius Ahenobarbus in the Field of Mars, bas-relief, Roman Republic, 2nd century BC

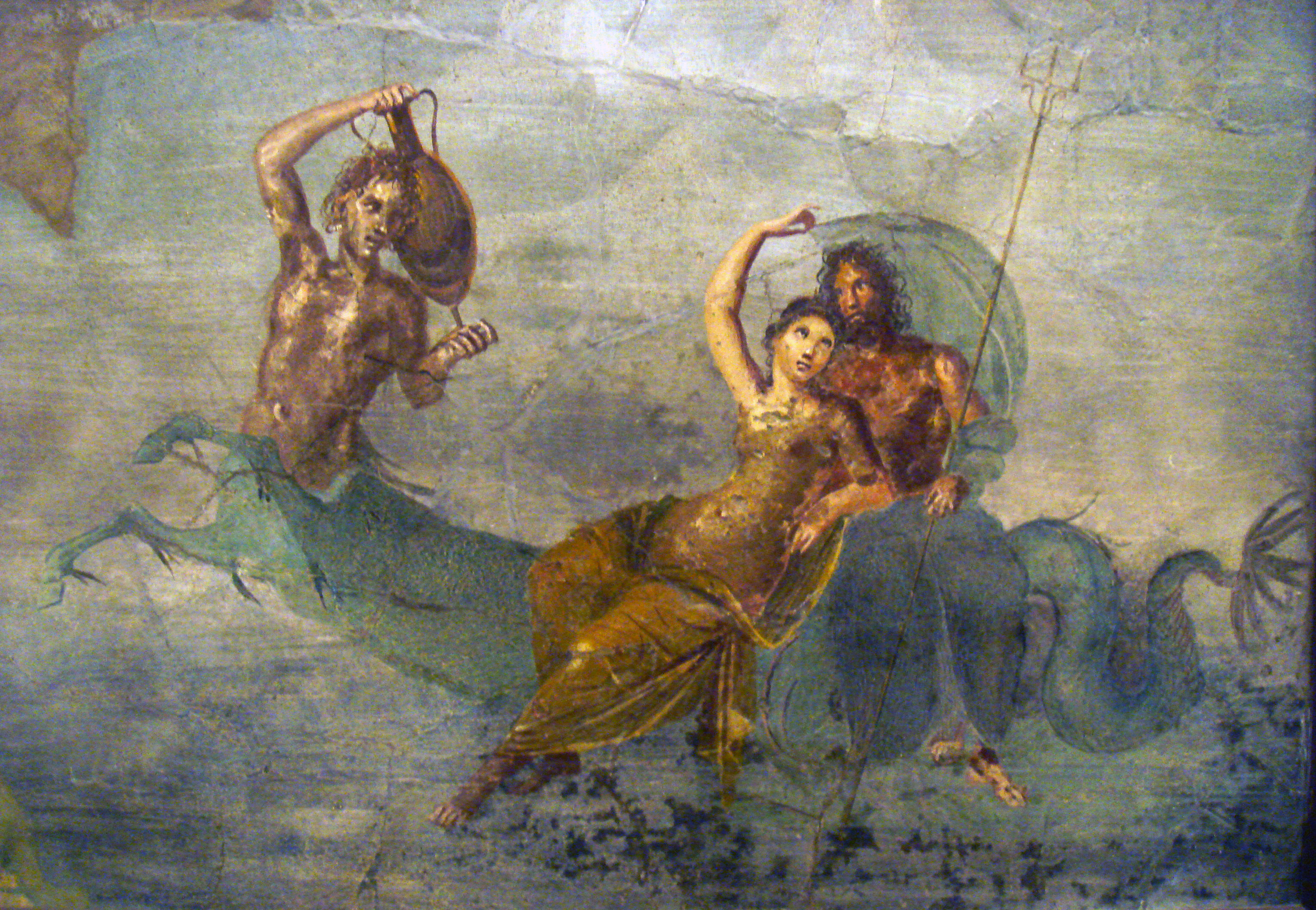
Poseidon and Amphitrite. Ancient Roman fresco (50-79 AD), Pompeii, Italy.

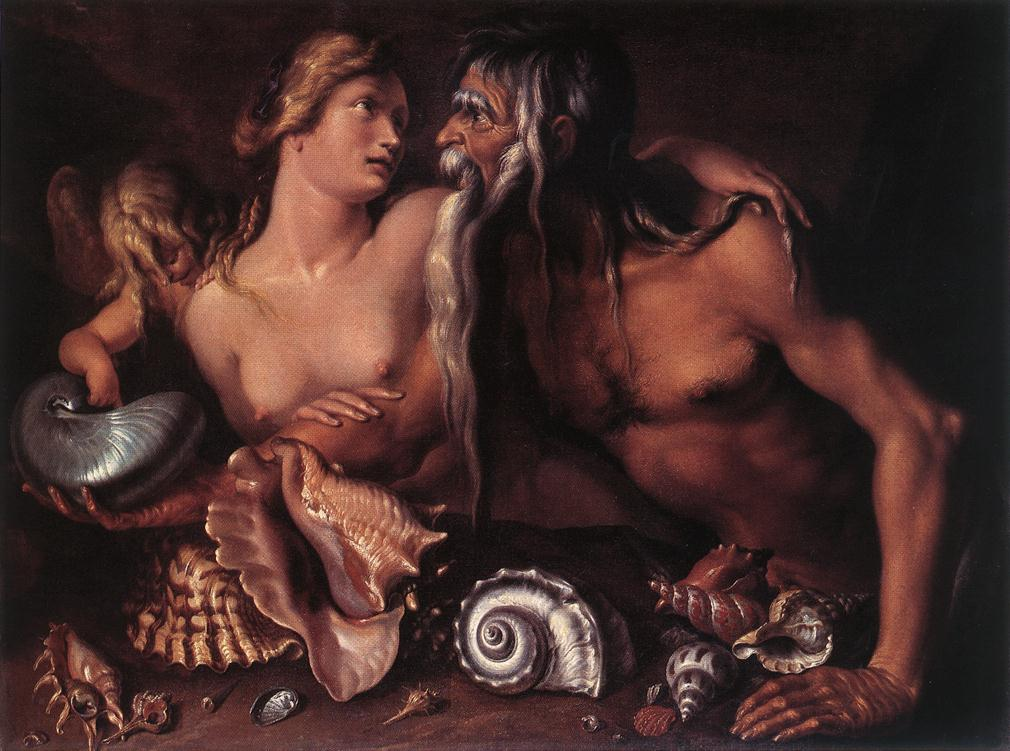
Neptune and Amphitrite by Jacob de Gheyn II (latter 16th-century)

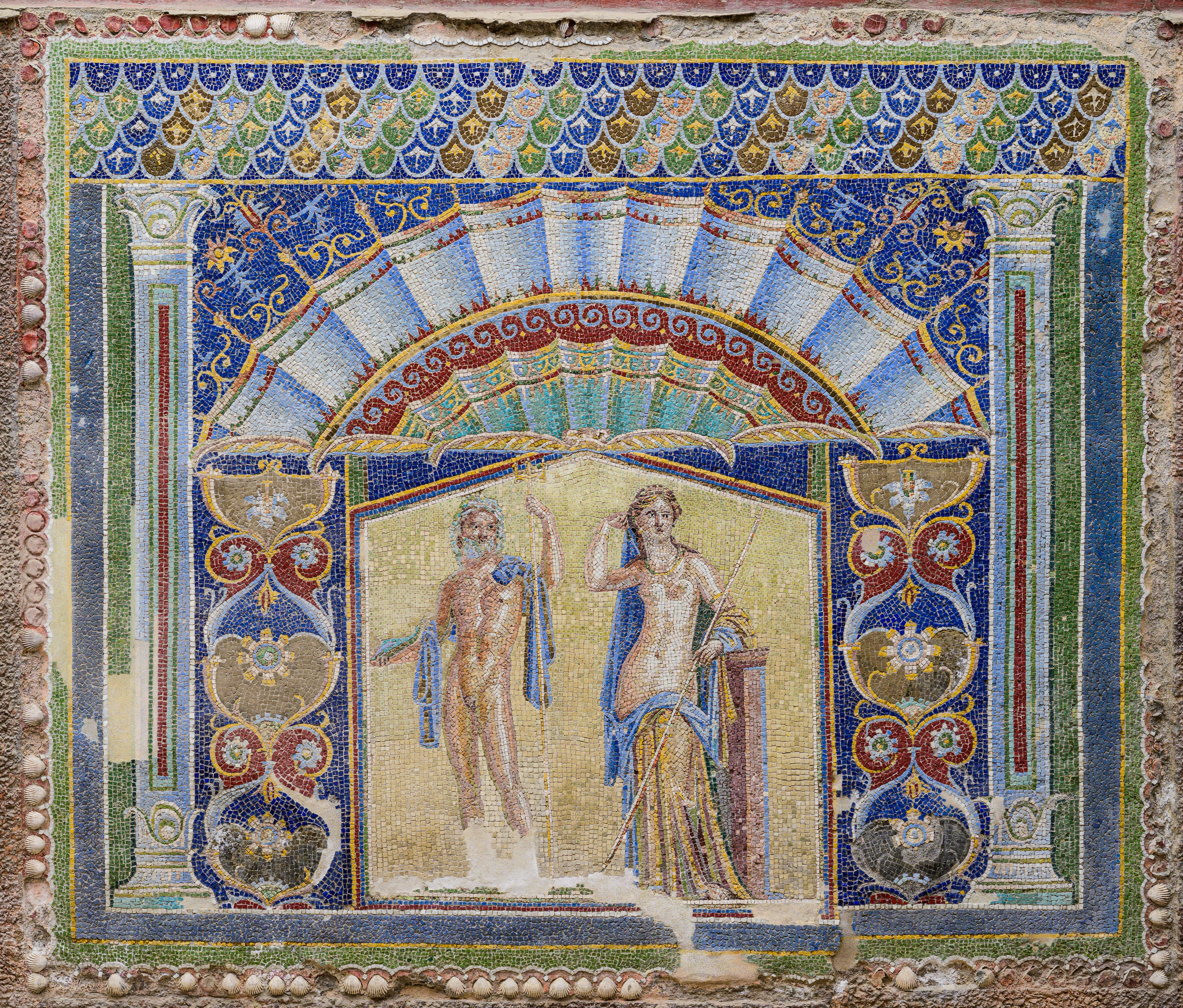
A Roman mosaic on a wall in the House of Neptune and Amphitrite, Herculaneum, Italy

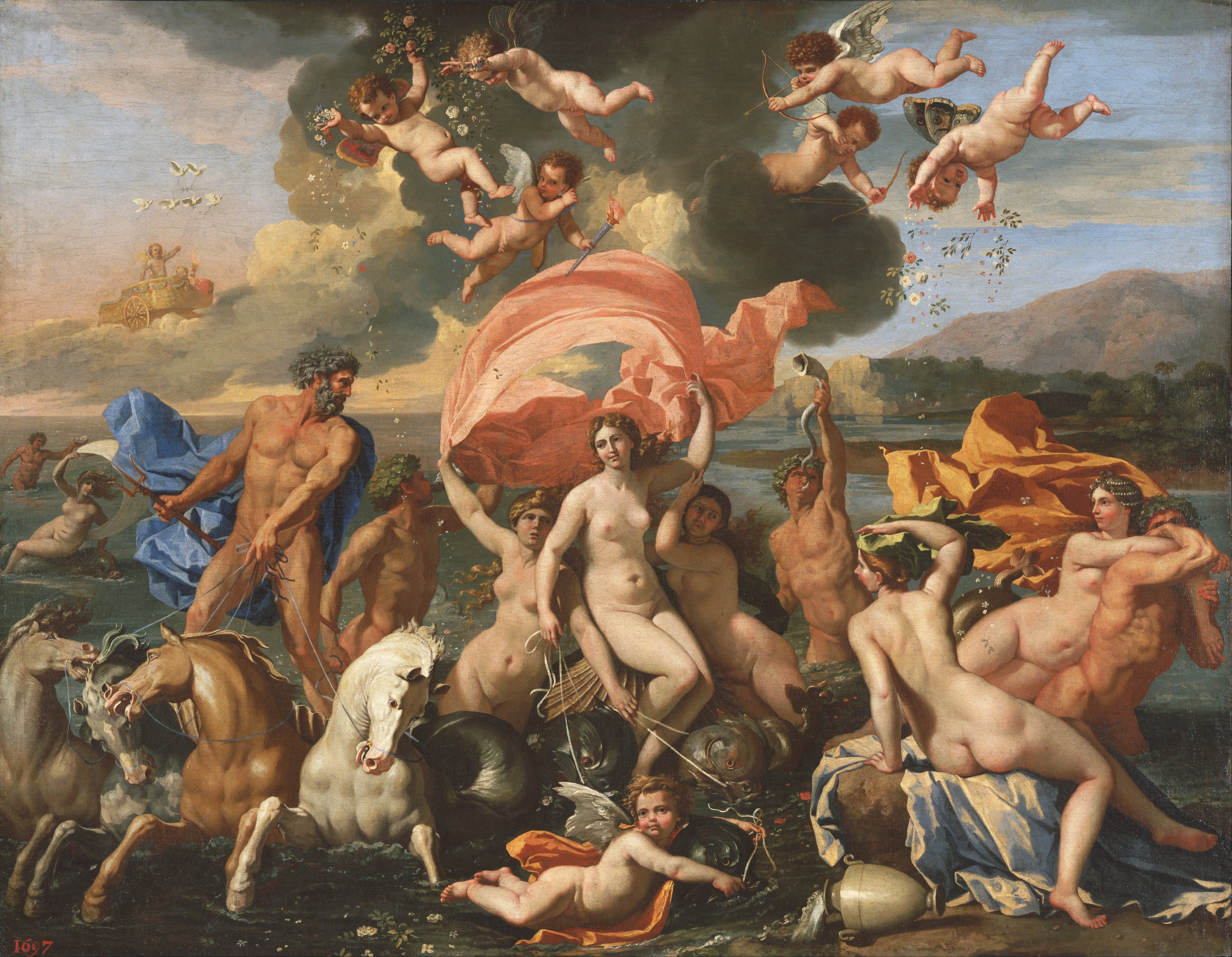
The Triumph of Neptune by Nicolas Poussin, showing Amphitrite velificans (1634)

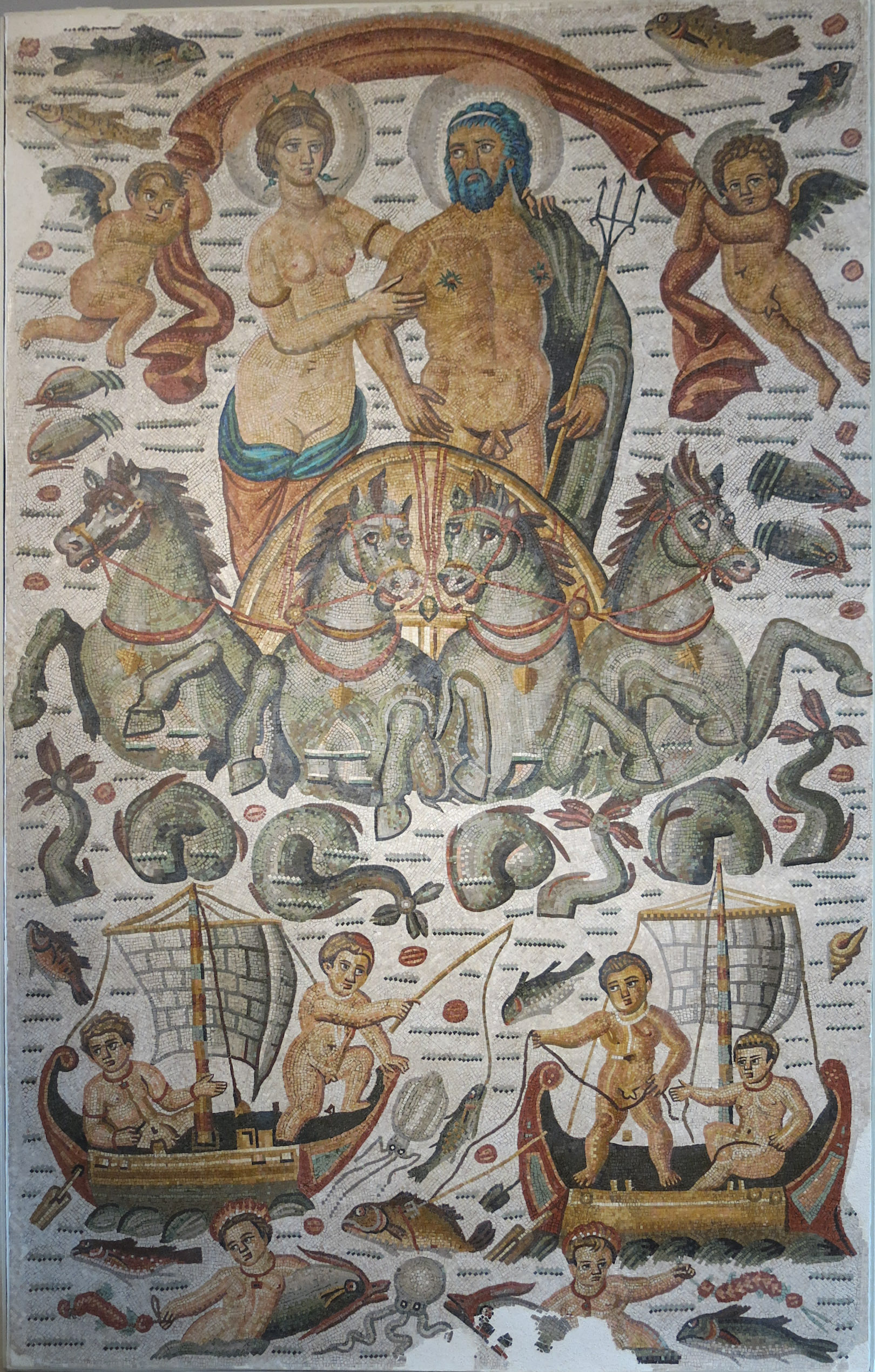
Triumph of Poseidon and Amphitrite showing the couple in procession, detail of a vast mosaic from Cirta, Roman Africa (c. 315–325 AD, now at the Louvre)

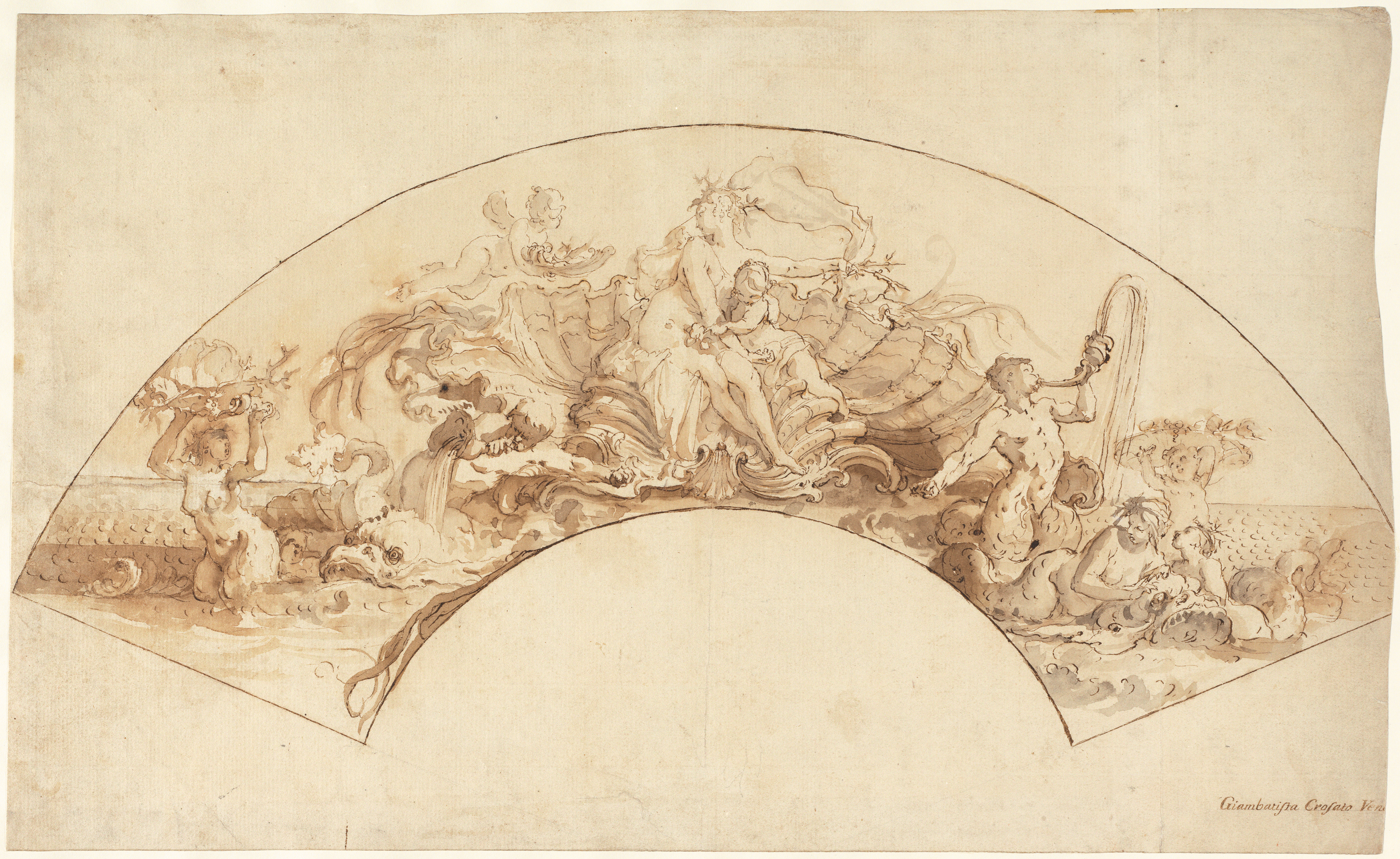
Drawing of Amphitrite sitting in a sea shell surrounded by her subjects. The Triumph of Amphitrite by Giovanni Battista Crosato (1745–1750). Held at the National Gallery of Art.

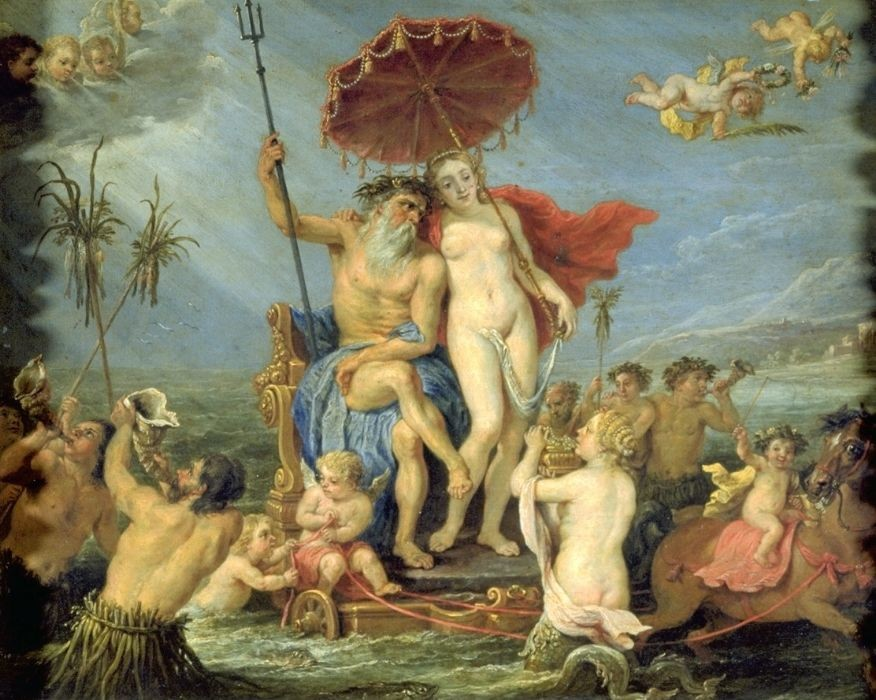
Neptune and Amphitrite (1647), by David Teniers the Younger

== Legacy ==
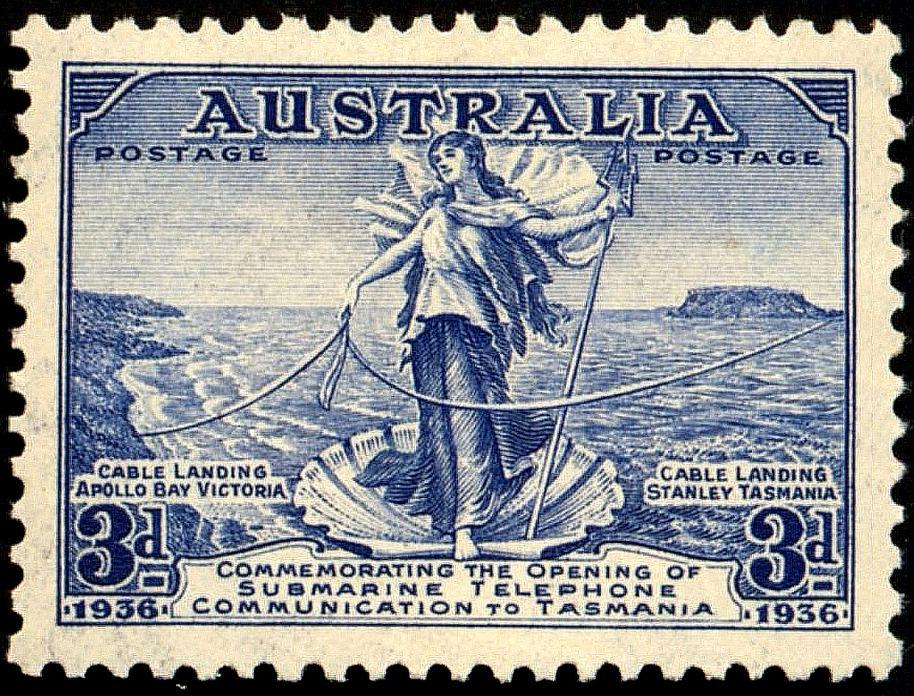
Amphitrite on 1936 Australian stamp commemorating completion of submarine telephone cable to Tasmania

- Amphitrite is the name of a genus of the worm family Terebellidae.
- In poetry, Amphitrite's name is often used for the sea, as a synonym of Thalassa.
- Seven ships of the Royal Navy were named HMS Amphitrite
- Amphitrite (1802 ship), which wrecked in 1833 with heavy loss of life while transporting convicts to New South Wales
- Three ships of the United States Navy were named USS Amphitrite.
- An asteroid, 29 Amphitrite, is named for her.
- In 1936, Australia used an image of Amphitrite on a postage stamp as a classical allusion for the submarine communications cable across Bass Strait from Apollo Bay, Victoria to Stanley, Tasmania.
- A statue of Amphitrite stands at the United States Merchant Marine Academy in Kings Point, NY
