= List of ship launches in 1785 =

The list of ship launches in 1785 includes a chronological list of some ships launched in 1785.

Date	Ship	Class	Builder	Location	Country	Notes
22 January	San Ildefonso	Third rate	Juan Fernandez Romero de Landa	Cartagena	Spain	For Spanish Navy.
27 January	Gorgon	Adventure-class ship	Perry & Hankey	Blackwall Yard	Great Britain	For Royal Navy.
January	Duke of Montrose	East Indiaman	Randall	Rotherhithe	Great Britain	For British East India Company.
10 February	Regulus	Roebuck-class ship	Thomas Raymond	Northam	Great Britain	For Royal Navy.
28 February	Meleager	Fifth rate	Greaves & Nickoldson	Frindsbury	Great Britain	For Royal Navy.
5 March	Santa Brigida	Frigate		Cartagena, Spain	Spain	For Spanish Navy.
7 March	Taganrog	Fifth rate		Gniltonskaya	Russia	For Imperial Russian Navy.
10 March	Chichester	Adventure-class ship	Caleb Crookenden	West Itchenor	Great Britain	For Royal Navy.
11 March	Guerriera	Third rate		Venice	Republic of Venice	For Venetian Navy.
26 March	Scorpion	Echo-class sloop	Benjamin Ashman	Shoreham-by-Sea	Great Britain	For Royal Navy.
26 March	Solebay	Amazon-class frigate	Henry Adams	Deptford	Great Britain	For Royal Navy.
28 March	Terrible	Culloden-class ship of the line	Wells	Rotherhithe	Great Britain	For Royal Navy.
27 April	Victorious	Culloden-class ship of the line	Perry	Blackwall Yard	Great Britain	For Royal Navy.
8 May	Kizliar	Kavkaz-class corvette		Kazan	Russia	For Imperial Russian Navy.
8 May	Mozdok	Bomb vessel		Kazan	Russia	For Imperial Russian Navy.
9 May	Squirrel	Sixth rate	Barton	Liverpool	Great Britain	For Royal Navy.
9 May	Thetis	Sixth rate		Amsterdam	Dutch Republic	For Dutch Navy.
13 May	Briachislav	Briachislav-class frigate	M. D. Portnov	Arkhangelsk	Russia	For Imperial Russian Navy.
13 May	Mstislav	Iaroslav-class ship of the line	M. D. Portnov	Arkhangelsk	Russia	For Imperial Russian Navy.
13 May	Premislav	Modified Pavel-class frigate	M. D. Portnove	Arkhangelsk	Russia	For Imperial Russian Navy.
13 May	Vseslav	Iaroslav-class ship of the line	M. D. Portnov	Arkhangelsk	Russia	For Imperial Russian Navy.
16 May	Mariia Magdalina	Slava Ekateriny-class ship of the line	S. I. Afanaseyev	Kherson	Russia	For Imperial Russian Navy.
19 May	Pijl	Brig		Amsterdam	Dutch Republic	For Dutch Navy.
26 May	Castor	Amazon-class frigate	Joseph Graham	Harwich	Great Britain	For Royal Navy.
2 June	Bed-i Nusret	Fourth rate		Constantinople	Ottoman Empire	For Ottoman Navy.
8 June	Melampus	Fifth rate	Hilhouse	Bristol	Great Britain	For Royal Navy.
16 June	Sviatoi Georgy Pobedonosets	Fourth Rate	S. I. Afanaseyev	Kherson	Russia	For Imperial Russian Navy.
21 June	Généreux	Téméraire-class ship of the line		Rochefort	Kingdom of France	For French Navy.
25 June	Proserpine	Hébé-class frigate		Brest	Kingdom of France	For French Navy.
25 June	Zealous	Arrogant-class ship of the line	Barnard	Deptford	Great Britain	For Royal Navy.
12 July	Ramillies	Culloden-class ship of the line	John Randall	Rotherhithe	Great Britain	For Royal Navy.
16 July	San Antonio	Third rate		Cartagena	Spain	For Spanish Navy.
22 July	Hind	Coventry-class frigate	Clayton & Willson	Sandgate	Great Britain	For Royal Navy.
23 July	Audacious	Arrogant-class ship of the line	John Randall	Rotherhithe	Great Britain	For Royal Navy.
23 July	Medusa	Experiment-class ship	Thomas Pollard	Portsmouth	Great Britain	For Royal Navy.
July	Willem de Eerste	Third rate		Rotterdam	Dutch Republic	For Dutch Navy.
2 August	Nuestra Señora de la Paz	Fifth rate		Ferrol	Spain	For Spanish Navy.
4 August	Félicité	Félicité-class frigate	Pierre-Alexander Forfait	Brest	Kingdom of France	For French Navy.
23 August	San Giorgio	Leon Trionfante-class ship of the line	Scabozzi Manao	Venice	Republic of Venice	For Venetian Navy.
20 August	Kronprindsens Lystfregat	Royal yacht	Adam Hayes	Deptford	Great Britain	For Kronprinds Frederik.
16 September	Ferme	Téméraire-class ship of the line		Brest	Kingdom of France	For French Navy.
19 September	Fougueux	Téméraire-class ship of the line		Lorient	Kingdom of France	For French Navy.
21 September	Lapwing	Enterprise-class frigate	Thomas King	Dover	Great Britain	For Royal Navy.
21 September	Romulus	Flora-class frigate	Greaves & Purnell	Limehouse	Great Britain	For Royal Navy.
28 September	Nassau	Ardent-class ship of the line	Hilhouse	Bristol	Great Britain	For Royal Navy.
30 September	Circe	Enterprise-class frigate	Henry Ladd	Dover	Great Britain	For Royal Navy.
3 October	Patriote	Téméraire-class ship of the line		Brest	Kingdom of France	For French Navy.
7 October	Commerce de Marseille	Téméraire-class ship of the line		Toulon	Kingdom of France	For French Navy.
14 October	St George	Duke-class ship of the line		Portsmouth	Great Britain	For Royal Navy.
October	Manship	East Indiaman	Wells	Deptford	Great Britain	For British East India Company.
2 November	Rockingham	East Indiaman	Barnard	Deptford	Great Britain	For British East India Company.
16 November	Pomone	Frigate	Hubert Pennivert & Henri Chevillard	Rochefort	Kingdom of France	For French Navy.
16 November	William Pitt	East Indiaman	Perry	Blackwall	Great Britain	For British East India Company.
17 November	Borée	Téméraire-class ship of the line		Lorient	Kingdom of France	For French Navy.
2 December	Fleur de Lys	Galathée-class frigate		Rochefort	Kingdom of France	For French Navy.
3 December	Worcester	East Indiaman	Perry	Blackwall	Great Britain	For British East India Company.
11 December	Majestic	Canada-class ship of the line	Adams & Barnard	Deptford	Great Britain	For Royal Navy.
15 December	Woolwich	Adventure-class ship	Thomas Calhoue & John Nowlan	Bursledon	Great Britain	For Royal Navy.
17 December	Terpsichore	Amazon-class frigate	James Betts	Mistleythorn	Great Britain	For Royal Navy.
Unknown date	Alexander	Slave ship		Bristol	Great Britain	For private owner.
Unknown date	Backhouse	West Indiaman		Chester	Great Britain	For Tarleton & Backhouse.
Unknown date	Borrowdale	Collier		Sunderland	Great Britain	For private owner.
Unknown date	Bridgewater	East Indiaman	Barnard	Deptford	Great Britain	For British East India Company.
Unknown date	Cadiz Dispatch	Merchantman		Liverpool	Great Britain	For private owner.
Unknown date	Experiment	Sailing ship	Nicholas Bools	Bridport	Great Britain	For unknown owner.
Unknown date	Flora	Man-of-war		Friesland	Dutch Republic	For Dutch Navy.
Unknown date	Galathe	Man-of-war		Friesland	Dutch Republic	For Dutch Navy.
Unknown date	Haarlem	Third rate		Amsterdam	Dutch Republic	For Dutch Navy.
Unknown date	Hastings	Brig		Bombay	India	For Bombay Pilot Service.
Unknown date	King George	Merchantman		South Shields	Great Britain	For King George's Sound Company.
Unknown date	Manligheten	Man of war			Sweden	For Swedish Navy.
Unknown date	Margaret	Brig			Great Britain	For private owner.
Unknown date	Nine Sisters	West Indiaman			Great Britain	For J. Lockier.
Unknown date	Nordstiernen	Prindsesse Sophia Frederica-class ship of the line			Denmark-Norway	For Dano-Norwegian Navy.
Unknown date	Orakabeza	West Indiaman		Hull	Great Britain	For Mr. Burton.
Unknown date	Phoenix	East Indiaman	Wells		Great Britain	For British East India Company.
Unknown date	Queen	East Indiaman	Randall	Rotherhithe	Great Britain	For British East India Company.
Unknown date	Sally	Merchantman		Liverpool	Great Britain	For private owner.
Unknown date	Sappho	Merchantman		South Shields	Great Britain	For T. Weir.
Unknown date	Shaftesbury	Sloop	Nicholas Bools	Bridport	Great Britain	For Francis Stewart and William Thadden.
Unknown date	Wesp	Full-rigged ship		Rotterdam	Dutch Republic	For Dutch Navy.
Unknown date	Zeehond	Man-of-war		Rotterdam	Dutch Republic	For Dutch Navy.
Unknown date	Name unknown	Chasse-marée		Cherbourg	Kingdom of France	For private owner.
Unknown date	Name unknown	Merchantman			Dutch Republic	For private owner.
Unknown date	Name unknown	Merchantman		Bermuda	(Kingdom of Great Britain) Bermuda	For private owner.
