= List of shipwrecks in 1792 =

The List of shipwrecks in 1792 includes ships sunk, foundered, wrecked, grounded or otherwise lost during 1792.

table of contents
1792
Jan	Feb	Mar	Apr
May	Jun	Jul	Aug
Sep	Oct	Nov	Dec
Unknown date

== January ==
=== 21 January ===
List of shipwrecks: 21 January 1792
Ship	State	Description
Ancona	Great Britain	The ship was sighted in the English Channel off the Isle of Wight whilst on a voyage from Gallipoli, Apulia to Hull, Yorkshire. No further trace, presumed foundered with the loss of all hands.
Douglas	Great Britain	The ship foundered in the Irish Sea off Cork, Ireland. She was on a voyage from London to Cork and Jamaica.

=== 22 January ===
List of shipwrecks: 22 January 1792
Ship	State	Description
Palm Tree	Dutch Republic	The ship was sighted off The Caskets whilst on a voyage from the Bay of Saloe to Ostend. No further trace, presumed foundered with the loss of all hands.

=== 23 January ===
List of shipwrecks: 23 January 1792
Ship	State	Description
Atkinson	Great Britain	The ship was run down and sunk in the English Channel off The Lizard, Cornwall by New Hope (Great Britain). Her crew were rescued by New Hope. Atkinson was on a voyage from Shoreham-by-Sea, Sussex to Liverpool, Lancashire.

=== Unknown date ===
List of shipwrecks: Unknown date in January 1792
Ship	State	Description
Ann	Great Britain	The ship was lost on the coast of County Galway, Ireland. She was on a voyage from Greenock, Renfrewshire to Charleston, South Carolina, United States.
Betsey	Great Britain	The ship was lost whilst on a voyage from Whitehaven, Cumberland to Dublin, Ireland. Her crew were rescued.
Bryante	France	The ship was lost whilst on a voyage from Honfleur, Calvados to L'Orient, Morbihan.
Dame Martha	Dutch Republic	The ship was driven ashore at Ostend, West Flanders. She was on a voyage from Nantes, Loire-Inférieure, France to Bruges, West Flanders.
Daniel and Harriet	Great Britain	The ship foundered in the Irish Sea off Kinsale, County Cork, Ireland before 26 January with the loss of all hands.
Duke of Normandie	France	The ship was lost at Brest, Finistère. She was on a voyage from Marseille, Bouches-du-Rhône to Le Havre, Seine-Inférieure.
Favourite	Great Britain	The ship was driven ashore at Neath, Glamorgan.
Friends	Great Britain	The ship foundered in the Mediterranean Sea off Sardinia.
Gustaff	Flag unknown	The ship was lost at Figueira da Foz, Portugal. She was on a voyage from Weymouth, Dorset, Great Britain to Figueira da Foz.
Henry	Great Britain	The ship was lost at St Martin's, Isles of Scilly.
Hero	Bremen	The ship was driven ashore near Blankenberge, West Flanders, Dutch Republic. She was on a voyage from Bremen to Lisbon, Portugal.
Isabella	Great Britain	The ship was driven ashore at Tarifa, Spain. She was on a voyage from Livorno, Grand Duchy of Tuscany to Liverpool, Lancashire.
La Diligence de Cadiz	France	The ship foundered in the English Channel off Le Havre with the loss of three of her crew. She was on a voyage from Alicante, Spain to Rouen, Seine-Inférieure.
Les Amis	France	The ship foundered in the North Sea off Ostend, West Flanders. She was on a voyage from Marseille to Ostend.
Leviathan	Great Britain	The ship foundered in the North Sea off the mouth of the Humber. Her crew were rescued.
Maldon	Great Britain	The ship foundered in the North Sea off Dunkerque, Nord, France. She was on a voyage from Spain to Dunkerque.
Marietta	Great Britain	The ship was driven ashore and wrecked on Cape Cod, Massachusetts, United States. She was on a voyage from Liverpool to Boston, Massachusetts.
Mary	Great Britain	The ship struck the Fair Ness Rock, in the North Sea off the coast of Kent, and sank. She was on a voyage from Dunkerque to Ramsgate, Kent and London.
Matty	Great Britain	The ship was wrecked whilst on a voyage from Londonderry, Ireland to Greenock, Renfrewshire.
Minerva	Sweden	The ship was driven ashore on Gotland. She was on a voyage from Stockholm to London.
Nancy	Ireland	The ship was driven ashore at St Lucar, Spain. She was on a voyage from Ireland to Cádiz, Spain.
Phœnix	Great Britain	The ship was driven ashore at St. Lucar. She was on a voyage from Cape Ann, Massachusetts, United States to Cádiz.
Salerno	Great Britain	The ship was driven ashore near Swansea, Glamorgan. She was on a voyage from Belfast, County Antrim, Ireland to Barcelona, Spain.
Sisters	Great Britain	The ship was driven ashore and wrecked on the Isle of Man. She was on a voyage from Wexford, Ireland to Liverpool.
Speedwell	Great Britain	The ship was lost off Bayonne, Basses-Pyrénées, France with the loss of two of her crew. She was on a voyage from Ipswich, Suffolk to St. Andero, Spain.
Sultan	Great Britain	The ship was driven ashore near Broadstairs, Kent. She was on a voyage from London to Smyrna, Ottoman Empire. Sultan was later refloated.
Three Sisters	Great Britain	The ship was driven ashore at Par, Cornwall. She was on a voyage from London to San Sebastián, Spain.
Unity	Great Britain	The ship was driven ashore near Broadstairs, Kent. She was on a voyage from Gainsborough, Lincolnshire to London.
Vriendschap	Denmark	The ship foundered in the Kattegat. She was on a voyage from Bordeaux, Gironde, France to Copenhagen.
Vrow Maria	Flag unknown	The ship was wrecked on the coast of France.
Unnamed	Great Britain	The ship was driven ashore at Dover, Kent.

== February ==
=== 18 February ===
List of shipwrecks: 18 February 1792
Ship	State	Description
Friendship	Great Britain	The ship was driven ashore at Rostock. She was on a voyage from London to Saint Petersburg, Russia.

=== 25 February ===
List of shipwrecks: 25 February 1792
Ship	State	Description
Matilda	Great Britain	The full-rigged ship, a whaler, was wrecked on a shoal in the Pacific Ocean. HMS Providence ( (Kingdom of Great Britain) Royal Navy), Britannia, and Jenny (both Great Britain) rescued 22 survivors.

=== Unknown date ===
List of shipwrecks: Unknown date in February 1792
Ship	State	Description
Adam de Pieter	Dutch Republic	The ship driven ashore near Beachy Head, Sussex Great Britain. She was on a voyage from Dort to London, Great Britain.
Blandford	Great Britain	The ship was driven ashore by ice in the Chesapeake River, United States.
Caroline	Great Britain	The ship was lost near Falmouth, Cornwall. She was on a voyage from London to Cork, Ireland and Jamaica.
Chambers	Great Britain	The ship foundered in the Atlantic Ocean. Thomas (Great Britain) rescued her crew.
Cloe	Dutch Republic	The ship was driven ashore on the Kent coast and abandoned by her crew. She was on a voyage from Rotterdam to Baltimore. Cloe was later refloated and taken in to Ramsgate, Kent, Great Britain.
Delight	Ireland	The ship was lost in Clonagilty Bay with the loss of all hands. She was on a voyage from Limerick to Pool, Dorset, Great Britain.
Dove	Ireland	The ship was lost near Faro, Portugal. Her crew were rescued. She was on a voyage from Cádiz, Spain to Limerick.
Elizabeth	Great Britain	The ship foundered in Cádiz Bay. She was on a voyage from Glasgow, Renfrewshire to Alicante, Spain.
Elizabeth	Great Britain	The ship was driven ashore at Great Yarmouth, Norfolk. She was on a voyage from Hamburg to Hull, Yorkshire.
Fanny	Great Britain	The ship was driven ashore at Waterford, Ireland. She was on a voyage from Boston, Massachusetts, United States to Liverpool, Lancashire.
Fellowship	Great Britain	The ship was driven ashore and wrecked at Lowestoft, Suffolk. She was on a voyage from Sunderland, County Durham to Dunkerque.
Flora	Hamburg	The ship was driven ashore at Great Yarmouth. Her crew were rescued. She was on a voyage from Hamburg to Brest, Finistère, France.
Friends	Ireland	The ship was driven ashore and wrecked in Gibraltar Bay. She was on a voyage from Alicante to Newry, County Antrim.
Friends Goodwill	Great Britain	The ship was driven ashore on the coast of Zeeland, Dutch Republic. She was on a voyage from London to Ostend, West Flanders, Dutch Republic.
Friendship	Great Britain	The ship was driven ashore at Padstow, Cornwall.
George	Great Britain	The ship was driven ashore by ice in the Chesapeake River.
George Hendrick	Rostock	The ship was wrecked on the Goodwin Sands, Kent, Great Britain. She was on a voyage from Rostock to Bordeaux, Loire-Inférieure, France.
Goodwill	Dutch Republic	The ship was driven ashore near Ostend. She was later refloated and taken in to Ostend.
Hercules	Hamburg	The ship ran aground on the Nore. She was on a voyage from Hamburg to London.
John & Ann	Great Britain	The ship was driven ashore and wrecked at Burnham Flats, Norfolk. Her crew were rescued.
Le Grâce de Dieu	France	The ship was driven ashore. She was on a voyage from Marseille, Bouches-du-Rhône to Le Havre, Seine-Inférieure.
Le Jeune Elizabeth	France	The ship was driven ashore . She was on a voyage from Marseille to Rouen, Seine-Inférieure.
Mary	Great Britain	The ship was lost near Great Yarmouth. She was on a voyage from King's Lynn, Norfolk to Liverpool.
Mary	Great Britain	The ship was lost near The Lizard, Cornwall. She was on a voyage from Liverpool to Bordeaux.
Neptune	Great Britain	The ship was wrecked on the coast of France. Her crew were rescued. She was on a voyage from Hull to Nice, Alpes Maritimes, France.
Patriote	Dutch Republic	The ship foundered in the English Channel off Dover, Kent, Great Britain. She was on a voyage from Cádiz to Ostend.
Pomona	Hamburg	The ship was wrecked on the Goodwin Sands. She was on a voyage from Hamburg to Porto, Portugal.
Robert & Dorothy	Great Britain	The ship was wrecked on the Barber Sand, in the North Sea off the coast of Norfolk. She was on a voyage from Sunderland to London.
Speedwell	Great Britain	The ship was driven ashore near Great Yarmouth. She was on a voyage from Dysart, Fife to Bremen.
Triple Alliance	Spain	The ship was lost near Rota She was on a voyage from Málaga to Ostend.
Volunteer	Great Britain	The ship was driven ashore near Liverpool, Lancashire. She was on a voyage from Londonderry, Ireland to Liverpool.
Vrow Classina	Flag unknown	The ship was driven ashore and wrecked on the south coast of the Isle of Wight, Great Britain.

== March ==
=== 6 March ===
List of shipwrecks: 6 March 1792
Ship	State	Description
De Yonge Jan Konter	Flag unknown	The ship was wrecked at Åbo, Sweden.
Hoppet	Sweden	The hoy foundered in the English Channel 6 leagues (18 nautical miles (33 km) off Cowes, Isle of Wight, Great Britain. Her crew were rescued. She was on a voyage from Uddevalla to Cork, Ireland.
Stanislas	France	African slave trade: The ship was wrecked on Long Long Island. Her crew and about 300 slaves were rescued.

=== 8 March ===
List of shipwrecks: 8 March 1792
Ship	State	Description
Unnamed	Great Britain	The brig was wrecked on the Herd Sand, in the North Sea off the coast of County Durham. Her crew were rescued.

=== 17 March ===
List of shipwrecks: 17 March 1792
Ship	State	Description
Hales Castle	Great Britain	The ship was run into by the brig Paisley (Great Britain) in the Firth of Forth and sank. Three of her six crew were rescued by Paisley, the other three by HMS Martin ( (Kingdom of Great Britain) Royal Navy).

=== 23 March ===
List of shipwrecks: 23 March 1792
Ship	State	Description
Young Peter	Flag unknown	The ship was wrecked on The Strand, County Kerry, Ireland Her crew were rescued. She was on a voyage from Martinique to Dunkerque, Nord, France.

=== 24 March ===
List of shipwrecks: 24 March 1792
Ship	State	Description
Unnamed	Great Britain	The barge sank in the River Thames at the Red House, London.
Two unnamed vessels	Great Britain	The barges sank in the River Thames at Westminster Bridge, London.

=== Unknown date ===
List of shipwrecks: Unknown date in March 1792
Ship	State	Description
Ann	Great Britain	The ship was driven onto rocks at Mountbatten, Devon and severely damaged.
Anna Maria	Sweden	The ship was lost near Strömstad with the loss of all hands. She was on a voyage from "Clayholm" to Stockholm.
Betsey	Great Britain	The ship was wrecked at Quillebeuf-sur-Seine, Eure, France. She was on a voyage from Rouen, Seine-Inférieure, France to London.
Bridget	Great Britain	The ship was lost at "Cape Valnas". Her crew were rescued.
Charlotte	Ireland	The ship was driven ashore near Gibraltar. She was on a voyage from Nice, Alpes Maritimes, France to Baltimore, County Cork.
Cheesman	United States	The ship ran aground on the Flemish Banks. She was on a voyage from Amsterdam, North Holland, Dutch Republic to New York. She was refloated and resumed her voyage, but put in to Cowes, Isle of Wight, Great Britain in a leaky condition.
Echo	Great Britain	The ship was wrecked on the coast of Jutland with the loss of thirteen of her crew. She was on a voyage from Margate, Kent to Memel, Prussia.
Elliot	Great Britain	The ship was driven ashore at Lindisfarne, Northumberland. She was on a voyage from Borrowstounness, Lothian to London.
Fame	Great Britain	The ship was wrecked on the Irish coast. She was on a voyage from Virginia, United States to Liverpool, Lancashire.
Fille Unique	France	The ship was driven ashore near Waterford, Ireland. She was on a voyage from Martinique to Marseille, Bouches-du-Rhône.
Good Intent	Great Britain	The ship was wrecked on the Goodwin Sands, Kent. Her crew were rescued. She was on a voyage from Portsmouth, Hampshire to London.
Hartley	Great Britain	The ship was wrecked on Fyal, Azores.
Hope	Great Britain	The ship was driven ashore at Margate. Her crew were rescued. She was on a voyage from Lisbon, Portugal to London.
Jenny	Ireland	The ship foundered in the Mediterranean Sea. Her crew were rescued. she was on a voyage from Londonderry to Venice.
La Auguste	France	The ship was lost near Cádiz, Spain. Her crew were rescued. She was on a voyage from Virginia to Marseille, Bouches-du-Rhône.
Lilla Johanna	Sweden	The ship was driven ashore and wrecked on Öland. She was on a voyage from the Øresund to Stockholm.
Lily	Great Britain	The ship was wrecked on Fayal.
Louisa	Great Britain	The ship was wrecked at Crookhaven, County Cork, Ireland. Her crew were rescued. She was on a voyage from Saint Kitts to London.
Lovel	Ireland	The ship ran aground in the River Suir. She was on a voyage from Waterford to Lisbon, Portugal.
Lovely Betsey	Great Britain	The ship was lost in Pool Day Bay, Wales.
Pike	Great Britain	The ship ran aground on rocks at Rota, Spain. She was on a voyage from Newfoundland, British America to Cádiz. Pike was refloated and taken in to Cádiz, where she was declared a total loss.
Recovery	Great Britain	The ship was run down and sunk in the North Sea off Cromer, Norfolk. Her crew were rescued. She was on a voyage from Dunkerque, Nord, France to Hull, Yorkshire.
Recovery	Great Britain	The ship was driven ashore in the River Avon. She was on a voyage from Bristol, Gloucestershire to Africa.
Sally	Great Britain	The ship was wrecked on Madeira.
Speedy	Great Britain	The ship was driven ashore at Cádiz. She was on a voyage from London to Carthagena, Spain. .
Superb	Great Britain	The ship was driven ashore 9 nautical miles (17 km) from Texel, North Holland. She was on a voyage from London to Hamburg. Superb was later refloated.

== April ==
=== 5 April ===
List of shipwrecks: 5 April 1792
Ship	State	Description
No. 1	Imperial Russian Navy	The ship was wrecked at the mouth of the Sfântu Gheorghe branch of the Danube, with the loss all but 8 of her 47 crew. Also mentioned as Svyatoy Andrey (Святой Андрей, 'St. Andrew')

=== 24 April ===
List of shipwrecks: 24 April 1792
Ship	State	Description
Garland	Great Britain	The former Garland-class frigate was wrecked on Coblers Rock, Barbados.

=== 28 April ===
List of shipwrecks: 28 April 1792
Ship	State	Description
Juliania	United States	The ship was wrecked at "Carne" while on a voyage from Maryland to Newry, County Down, Ireland.

=== Unknown date ===
List of shipwrecks: Unknown date in April 1792
Ship	State	Description
Ann	Great Britain	The ship was lost on the coast of Scotland. She was on a voyage from Liverpool, Lancashire to Limerick, Ireland.
Active	Great Britain	The ship was lost at Cape Bon, Tunisia with some loss of life. She was on a voyage from Ancona, Papal States to Barcelona, Spain.
Fly	Great Britain	The ship was driven ashore and wrecked in Plymouth Sound.
Holberg	(Denmark) Norway	The ship foundered in the Irish Sea off Milford, Pembrokeshire, Great Britain. She was on a voyage from Christiansand to Bristol, Gloucestershire, Great Britain.
Hope	Great Britain	The ship was wrecked on the Goodwin Sands, Kent. Her crew were rescued. She was on a voyage from Bordeaux, Gironde, France to London.
Maria Elizabeth	Stettin	The ship was driven ashore on the coast of Jutland. She was on a voyage from London to Stettin.
Mary Ann	Great Britain	The ship was lost at Bonny, Nigeria. Her crew were rescued.
Micobite	Great Britain	The ship was driven ashore in the River Thames at Greenwich, Kent. She was on a voyage from London to Gibraltar.
Pallas	Great Britain	The ship was driven ashore near Skagen, Denmark.
Three Sisters	Great Britain	The ship was driven ashore on the Welsh coast. She was on a voyage from London to Londonderry, Ireland.
Unanimity	Great Britain	The ship became trapped in ice off Viirelaid, Russia. Her crew were rescued. She was on a voyage from King's Lynn, Norfolk to Memel, Prussia. Unanimity was later taken in to the Bay of Larkal.
Union	Ireland	The ship was driven ashore in the River Foyle and severely damaged. She was on a voyage from New York, United States to Londonderry.
William	Great Britain	The ship was lost on the coast of Jutland. She was on a voyage from London to Memel.

== May ==
=== Unknown date ===
List of shipwrecks: Unknown date in May 1792
Ship	State	Description
Ann	Great Britain	The ship foundered in the Pentland Firth. She was on a voyage from Liverpool, Lancashire to a Baltic port.
Christiana Margaretta	(Sweden) Swedish Pomerania	The ship was driven ashore near Great Yarmouth, Norfolk, Great Britain. She was on a voyage from Stralsund to London, Great Britain.
George	Great Britain	The ship was lost at Memel, Prussia. He crew were rescued. She was on a voyage from St. Ubes, Portugal to Memel.
Henrietta	Dutch Republic	The ship was lost off Texel, North Holland. She was on a voyage from Saint Petersburg, Russia to Amsterdam.
La Dame Martha	France	The ship foundered whilst on a voyage from Saint-Valery-sur-Somme to Alexandria, Egypt.
Mary	Great Britain	The ship was lost near Cádiz, Spain. She was on a voyage from Liverpool to Marseille, Bouches-du-Rhône, France.
Mary Ann	Great Britain	The ship foundered in Lancaster Bay. Her crew were rescued. She was on a voyage from Liverpool to Ulverston, Lancashire.
Nancy	Great Britain	The ship was driven ashore near Whitstable, Kent. She was on a voyage from Cork, Ireland to London.
North Star	Ireland	The ship was lost near Gravelines, Nord, France. She was on a voyage from Stockholm, Sweden to Dublin.
Rachel & Mary	Great Britain	The ship foundered in the Baltic Sea off Memel. Her crew were rescued. She was on a voyage from Ostend, West Flanders, Dutch Republic to Libava, Duchy of Courland and Semigallia.

== June ==
=== 20 June ===
List of shipwrecks: 20 June 1792
Ship	State	Description
Ritson	Great Britain	The ship was destroyed by fire at Old Harbour, Jamaica.

=== Unknown date ===
List of shipwrecks: Unknown date in June 1792
Ship	State	Description
Barbadoes Packet	Ireland	The ship sank in the River Suir. She was on a voyage from Waterford to Newfoundland, British America.
Berkout	Dutch East India Company	The East Indiaman was driven ashore near Calais, France. She was refloated but subsequently was driven ashore at Dover, Kent, Kingdom of Great Britain. She was on a voyage from Amsterdam to Batavia, Dutch East Indies.
Hope	Great Britain	The ship was lost on the coast of Ireland. She was on a voyage from Porto, Portugal to Plymouth, Devon.
John & Elizabeth	Sweden	The ship was driven ashore crewless at Skagen, Denmark, She was on a voyage from Gothenburg to Kirkcaldy, Fife, Great Britain.
Polly	Ireland	The ship was lost on the Norwegian coast. She was on a voyage from Trondheim, Norway to Dublin.
Salisbury	Great Britain	The ship was driven ashore crewless at Great Yarmouth, Norfolk. She was on a voyage from Memel, Prussia to Newcastle upon Tyne, Northumberland.
Success	Great Britain	The ship was wrecked on Texel, North Holland, Dutch Republic.
Three Brothers	Great Britain	The ship was driven ashore at Memel. She was on a voyage from Dartmouth, Devon to London.

== July ==
=== 14 July ===
List of shipwrecks: 14 July 1792
Ship	State	Description
Thomas	Great Britain	The ship was driven ashore at Saint Kitts.

=== Unknown date ===
List of shipwrecks: Unknown date in July 1792
Ship	State	Description
Desire	Great Britain	The ship was driven ashore and wrecked near Cromer, Norfolk. She was on a voyage from Saint Petersburg, Russia to Bristol, Gloucestershire.
Trinity	Great Britain	The ship was driven ashore at Margate, Kent. She was on a voyage from London to Drogheda, County Louth, Ireland.

== August ==
=== 1 August ===
List of shipwrecks: 1 August 1792
Ship	State	Description
Adelphi	Great Britain	The ship foundered in the North Sea off Happisburgh, Norfolk.

=== 20 August ===
List of shipwrecks: 20 August 1792
Ship	State	Description
Crampus	Great Britain	The ship capsized near Plymouth, Devon. Her crew were rescued. She was on a voyage from Whitehaven, Cumberland to London.
Industry	Great Britain	The ship capsized near Plymouth. Her crew were rescued. She was on a voyage from Looe, Cornwall to Plymouth.
Winterton	British East India Company	The East Indiaman was wrecked on the coast of Madagascar with the loss of 45 lives.

=== 23 August ===
List of shipwrecks: 23 August 1792
Ship	State	Description
Renommée	France	The whaler was destroyed by fire off "New Port". She was on a voyage from L'Orient, Morbihan to the South Seas.

=== Unknown date ===
List of shipwrecks: Unknown date in August 1792
Ship	State	Description
America	United States	The ship was driven ashore near Den Helder, North Holland, Dutch Republic. She was on a voyage from Philadelphia, Pennsylvania to Amsterdam, North Holland.
Betsey	Great Britain	The ship was in collision with Chamont (Great Britain) in Cádiz Bay and was beached.
Cato	France	The whaler was driven ashore at Dunkerque, Nord.
Jannet	Great Britain	The ship foundered in The Wash. She was on a voyage from Sunderland, County Durham to Rotterdam, South Holland, Dutch Republic.
George	Great Britain	The ship was wrecked on the Falsterbo Reef, in the Baltic Sea off the coast of Sweden. She was on a voyage from Stockholm, Sweden to Venice.
Richard	Great Britain	The ship ran aground near Dragør, Denmark. She was on a voyage from London to Saint Petersburg, Russia.
Ruby	Great Britain	The ship was wrecked in the Orkney Islands while on a voyage from Memel, Prussia to Liverpool, Lancashire.
Southampton	Great Britain	The ship was lost on the Needing. She was on a voyage from Memel to Montrose, Forfarshire.
St. François	France	The ship departed from Cette, Hérault for Baltimore, Maryland and New York, United States. No further trace, presumed foundered with th loss of all hands.
St. Johannes	Danzig	The ship was lost near Gravelines, Nord. She was on a voyage from Danzig to Belfast, County Down, Ireland.

== September ==
=== 19 September ===
List of shipwrecks: 19 September 1792
Ship	State	Description
Experiment	Great Britain	The ship departed from St. John's, Newfoundland, British America for the Grand Banks of Newfoundland. No further trace, presumed foundered with the loss of all hands.

=== 21 September ===
List of shipwrecks: 21 September 1792
Ship	State	Description
Willaughby Bay Packet	(France) Saint Vincent	The ship was lost at Saint Vincent.

=== Unknown date ===
List of shipwrecks: Unknown date in September 1792
Ship	State	Description
Ann	Great Britain British America	The sloop departed from Capelin Bay for the Grand Banks of Newfoundland. No further trace, presumed foundered with the loss of all hands.
Castor & Pollux	Great Britain	The ship caught fire and was beached at Alicante, Spain.
De Vrow Rema	Elbing	The ship was wrecked at Ostend, West Flanders, Dutch Republic. Her crew were rescued.
Ebenezer	(Denmark) Norway	The ship capsized. Her crew were rescued.
Everley	Great Britain	The ship was wrecked on Hogland, Russia.
Fanny	Great Britain	The ship was lost near Great Yarmouth, Norfolk.
Friends Success	Great Britain	The ship was driven ashore near Ostend. She was on a voyage from Ostend to Sunderland, County Durham.
Hope	Great Britain	The ship was lost near Milford, Pembrokeshire. She was on a voyage from Pool, Dorset to Liverpool, Lancashire.
Lark	Great Britain	The ship was lost on Hogland. She was on a voyage from Hull, Yorkshire to Saint Petersburg, Russia.
Les Seux Frères	France	The ship was driven ashore near Ostend. She was on a voyage from the United States to Dunkerque, Nord.
L'Heureux Presage	France	The ship was lost near Bordeaux, Gironde. Her crew were rescued. She was on a voyage from Saint-Domingue to Bordeaux.
Mentor	Great Britain	The ship was lost near Hogland. She was on a voyage from Newcastle upon Tyne, Northumberland to Saint Petersburg.
Mermaid	Great Britain	The ship was driven ashore on the coast of Norfolk. She was on a voyage from London to King's Lynn, Norfolk.
Ocean	Great Britain	The ship was wrecked on Hogland. She was on a voyage from London to Saint Petersburg.
Rising Sun	Great Britain	The ship foundered in the Baltic Sea. Her crew were rescued.
Twee Gebroeders	Hanover	The ship was lost on Baltrum with the loss of all hands whilst bound for London.
Union	Great Britain	The ship was driven ashore and severely damaged. She was later refloated and taken in to Cowes, Isle of Wight. Union was on a voyage from Newcastle upon Tyne to Pool.

== October ==
=== 4 October ===
List of shipwrecks: 4 October 1792
Ship	State	Description
Unnamed	Dutch Republic	The sloop ran aground on the Bucksea Sand, in the North Sea off Bradwell, Essex, Great Britain. Her crew survived.

=== 7 October ===
List of shipwrecks: 7 October 1792
Ship	State	Description
Jonge Albert	Hamburg	The ship foundered in the North Sea off Southwold, Suffolk, Great Britain with the loss of all but one of her crew. She was on a voyage from Hamburg to Amsterdam, North Holland, Dutch Republic.

=== 12 October ===
List of shipwrecks: 12 October 1792
Ship	State	Description
Amity	Great Britain	The ship foundered. Her crew were rescued by Pitt (Great Britain).

=== 30 October ===
List of shipwrecks: 30 October 1792
Ship	State	Description
Dolphin	Great Britain	The ship was driven ashore at Atherfield, Isle of Wight and was wrecked. Her crew were rescued. She was on a voyage from Málaga, Spain to London.

=== Unknown date ===
List of shipwrecks: Unknownn in October date 1792
Ship	State	Description
Aid	Great Britain	The ship was driven ashore in the Humber. She was on a voyage from Saint Petersburg, Russia to Hull, Yorkshire.
Anna Eleonora	Stettin	The ship ran aground off Falsterbo, Sweden. She was on a voyage from Stettin to London, Great Britain.
Bygewal	Dutch Republic	The ship was lost between Vlissingen, Zeeland and Ostend, West Flanders. She was on a voyage from Brielle to London.
Cambria	Great Britain	The ship was run down and sunk in the Atlantic Ocean off Land's End, Cornwall. Her crew were rescued. She was on a voyage from Dublin, Ireland to London.
Collingwood	Great Britain	The ship was driven ashore and wrecked near Sandhammer, Norway.
Galoasen Eleazar	Sweden	The ship foundered in the North Sea off Wells-next-the-Sea, Norfolk, Great Britain. She was on a voyage from Stockholm to Dieppe, Seine-Inférieure, France.
Gustavus III	Sweden	The ship was lost at Skagen, Denmark. Her crew were rescued. She was on a voyage from Stockholm to Dublin.
Helena Charlotta	Denmark	The ship was lost near Harwich, Essex, Great Britain. She was on a voyage from Bordeaux, Gironde, France to Randers.
Hawke	Great Britain	The ship was lost near Penzance, Cornwall. She was on a voyage from Lisbon, Portugal to Copenhagen, Denmark.
Hoffnung	Stettin	The ship was driven ashore and wrecked at Happisburgh, Norfolk. Her crew were rescued. She was on a voyage from Stettin to London.
Hope	Hamburg	The ship was driven ashore between Great Yarmouth, Norfolk and Lowestoft, Suffolk. She was on a voyage from Hamburg to Barcelona, Spain.
Hope	Great Britain	The ship was wrecked on the Goodwin Sands, Kent. Her crew were rescued.
Hopewell	Great Britain	The ship was lost.
Hoppets Anchor	Sweden	The ship was lost off Wexford, Ireland.
Johanna Christina	Stettin	The ship foundered in the Baltic Sea off Møn, Denmark. She was on a voyage from Stettin to Hamburg.
Lord Bangor	Ireland	The ship was driven ashore in Cloughy Bay. She was on a voyage from Whitehaven, Cumberland, Great Britain to Jamaica.
Maria	Ireland	The ship was driven ashore near Strangford, County Antrim. She was on a voyage from Drogheda, County Louth to Memel, Prussia.
Nancy	(Denmark) Norway	The ship was wrecked on Whalsay, Shetland Islands, Great Britain. She was on a voyage from Norway to the Strait of Gibraltar.
Rosalie	France	The ship was lost at Dragør, Denmark. She was on a voyage from Saint Petersburg to Le Havre, Seine-Inférieure.
Sprig	Great Britain	The ship was driven ashore. She was on a voyage from Memel to London. She was refloated and taken in to Hull in a leaky condition.
St. Patrick	Ireland	The ship foundered off Achille Head. She was on a voyage from Galway to Greenock, Renfrewshire, Great Britain.
Union	Great Britain	The ship was lost near Bordeaux. She was on a voyage from London to Bordeaux.
West Indian	Great Britain	The ship was lost in the River Thames at Deptford, Kent. She was on a voyage from Jamaica to London.
Xenia	Great Britain	The ship foundered in the Kattegat.

== November ==
=== 10 November ===
List of shipwrecks: 10 November 1792
Ship	State	Description
La Belle Creole	France	The ship was abandoned in the Atlantic Ocean. Her crew were rescued by Aimable (France). La Belle Creole was on a voyage from Port-au-Prince, Saint-Domingue to Bordeaux, Gironde.

=== 15 November ===
List of shipwrecks: 15 November 1792
Ship	State	Description
Chance	Ireland	The ship departed from Jamaica for Belfast, County Down. No further trace, presumed foundered in the Atlantic Ocean with the loss of all hands.

=== 17 November ===
List of shipwrecks: 22 November 1792
Ship	State	Description
HMS Thunderer	Royal Navy	The Cullodden-class ship of the line was severely damaged by fire at Chatham Dockyard, Kent.

=== 20 November ===
List of shipwrecks: 20 November 1792
Ship	State	Description
Lark	Great Britain	The sloop was abandoned in the English Channel off Portland, Dorset. Two of her crew were rescued by a smack. They were landed at Portsmouth, Hampshire and promptly disappeared. Lark was on a voyage from Bilbao, Spain to London. It was surmised that the two survivors had murdered the rest of the crew and robbed the ship, as it was discovered that holes had been bored in her bottom. Lark was towed in to Cowes, Isle of Wight.

=== 22 November ===
List of shipwrecks: 22 November 1792
Ship	State	Description
De Kleine Regina	Prussia	The ship foundered in the English Channel. She was on a voyage from Memel to Liverpool, Lancashire, Great Britain.

=== 23 November ===
List of shipwrecks: 23 November 1792
Ship	State	Description
Bedford	Great Britain	The ship sank at Memel, Prussia.
Elizabeth	Great Britain	The ship sank at Memel.
Rachael	Great Britain	The ship sank at Memel.

=== Unknown date ===
List of shipwrecks: Unknown date in November 1792
Ship	State	Description
Acton	Great Britain	The ship was driven ashore at Great Yarmouth, Norfolk. She was on a voyage from Hull, Yorkshire to Memel, Prussia.
Anna Emerentia	Prussia	The ship was driven ashore near Pillau. She was on a voyage from London, Great Britain to Königsberg.
Blancy	Great Britain	The ship was driven ashore near Padstow, Cornwall. She was on a voyage from Labrador, British America to Dartmouth, Devon.
Blenheim	Great Britain	The ship was destroyed by fire off Bornholm, Denmark.
Brilliant	Great Britain	The ship was wrecked on Gotha Sand Island. She was on a voyage from Narva, Russia to Leith, Lothian.
Cadiz Dispatch	Great Britain	The slave ship was on her way from Rotterdam to Africa and the West Indies when she developed a leak at latitude 46° 48' North. She arrived at Portsmouth on 7 December with five feet of water in her hold.
Courier	France	The ship foundered in the English Channel off Saint-Valery-sur-Somme while on a voyage from L'Orient, Morbihan to Dunkerque, Nord.
Dolphin	Great Britain	The ship was lost near Pwllheli, Carnarvonshire. She was on a voyage from Cork, Ireland to Bristol, Gloucestershire.
Drey Sterne	Stettin	The ship was lost near "Poster Schilling". She was on a voyage from Stettin to Amsterdam, North Holland, Dutch Republic.
Eliza	Great Britain	The ship was driven ashore near Deal, Kent. She was on a voyage from the Charente to London. Eliza was later refloated and taken in to Ramsgate, Kent.
Emlyn	Great Britain	The ship was driven ashore in the Orkney Islands. She was on a voyage from Norway to Cardigan.
Friends	Great Britain	The ship was lost on the Vogel Sand, at the mouth of the Elbe. She was on a voyage from Liverpool, Lancashire to Hamburg.
Graff Henckell van Donersmark	Prussia	The ship departed from London for Memel. No further trace, presumed foundered with the loss of all hands.
Harrington	Great Britain	The ship was driven ashore near Milford, Pembrokeshire. She was on a voyage from Dublin, Ireland to Milford.
Hawke	Great Britain	The sloop was abandoned in the English Channel. She was later towed in to Cowes, Isle of Wight in a waterlogged condition.
London	Great Britain	The ship was driven ashore and wrecked near North Foreland, Kent. Her crew were rescued. She was on a voyage from London to Limington, Hampshire.
Mary Tanner	Great Britain	The ship was lost near Christiansand, Norway. She was on a voyage from Copenhagen, Denmark to the Firth of Forth.
Merry Batchelors	Great Britain	The ship was lost near Fraserburgh, Aberdeenshire. She was on a voyage from Caithness to London.
Minerva	Great Britain	The ship was driven ashore near Boulogne, Pas-de-Calais, France.
Phœnix	Great Britain	The ship was driven ashore near Padstow. She was on a voyage from Cork to Penzance, Cornwall.
Sally	Great Britain	The ship foundered in the Gulf of Finland. She was on a voyage from Liverpool to Saint Petersburg, Russia.
Standley Green	Great Britain	The ship was destroyed by fire in the River Thames. She was on a voyage from Jamaica to London.
St. Harard	France	The ship was in collision with Potowmack Planter (United States and foundered.
Swanwich	United States	The ship was driven ashore near Calais, France. She was on a voyage from Philadelphia, Pennsylvania to Dunkerque.
Three Sisters	Stettin	The ship sailed from Stettin bound for London. No further trace, presumed foundered with the loss of all hands.
Two Brothers	Hamburg	The ship was wrecked on the Vogel Sand. She was on a voyage from Bordeaux, Gironde, France to Hamburg.
Two Brothers	Great Britain	The ship was driven ashore near Fraserburgh. She was on a voyage from Caithness to London.
Wacksamheit	Hamburg	The ship was wrecked on the Vogel Sand. She was on a voyage from Bordeaux to Hamburg.

== December ==
=== 1 December ===
List of shipwrecks: 1 December 1792
Ship	State	Description
Three Sisters	Stettin	The ship departed from Uderstord, Norway for London, Great Britain. No further trace, presumed foundered with the loss of all hands.

=== 3 December ===
List of shipwrecks: 3 December 1792
Ship	State	Description
Frederick	(Sweden) Swedish Pomerania	The ship caught fire and sank in the English Channel off Weymouth, Dorset, Great Britain. Six crew were rescued. She was on a voyage from Bayonne, Basses-Pyrénées, France to Amsterdam, North Holland, Dutch Republic.

=== 4 December ===
List of shipwrecks: 4 December 1792
Ship	State	Description
Orion	Great Britain	The ship was lost near Thisted, Denmark. She was on a voyage from Stockholm, Sweden to London.

=== 8 December ===
List of shipwrecks: 8 December 1792
Ship	State	Description
Unnamed	French Navy	The gunboat ran aground in the Scheldt and was wrecked.

=== 17 December ===
List of shipwrecks: 17 December 1792
Ship	State	Description
Jenny	Great Britain	The ship foundered in the North Sea off Great Yarmouth, Norfolk.

=== 19 December ===
List of shipwrecks: 19 December 1792
Ship	State	Description
Griffin	United States	The ship was lost off Port Royal, Jamaica. She was on a voyage from Jamaica to Savannah, Georgia.

=== 21 December ===
List of shipwrecks: 21 December 1792
Ship	State	Description
Perle	French Navy	The Minerve-class frigate ran aground near Galéria, Corsica. She was on a voyage from Toulon, Var to Corsica.

=== 22 December ===
List of shipwrecks: 22 December 1792
Ship	State	Description
Anna Magdalena	Great Britain	The ship was wrecked at Galipoly, Italy.
Hope	Great Britain	The ship was wrecked at Galipoly.
Samuel and Ann	Great Britain	The ship was wrecked at Galipoly.
Trelandvean	Great Britain	The ship was wrecked at Galipoly.

=== Unknown date ===
List of shipwrecks: Unknown date in December 1792
Ship	State	Description
Alert	Great Britain	The ship was driven ashore near Gravelines Nord, France.
Anthony	United States	The ship was driven ashore on the Dutch coast. She was on a voyage from New York to Amsterdam, North Holland, Dutch Republic.
Apollo	Great Britain Guernsey	The ship was lost near Cette, Hérault, France. She was on a voyage from Guernsey to Cette.
Ariadne	Great Britain	The ship was wrecked on the Norwegian coast. She was on a voyage from London to Stettin.
Ballmer	Great Britain	The ship was lost on the Welsh coast. Her crew were rescued. She was on a voyage from Lisbon, Portugal to London.
Bernherdina	Denmark	The ship was driven ashore near Newport Pratt, County Mayo, Ireland. Her crew were rescued. She was on a voyage from Saint Thomas, Virgin Islands to Hamburg.
Blessing	Great Britain	The ship was wrecked on the coast of Jutland.
Britannia	Great Britain	The ship was lost on the coast of Jutland near "Robsnout". She was on a voyage from Saint Petersburg, Russia to London.
Brothers	Great Britain	The ship was driven ashore and wrecked at the mouth of the Clyde. She was on a voyage from Bristol, Gloucestershire to Londonderry, Ireland.
Brothers	Great Britain	The ship was lost at the mouth of the Elbe.
Cleveland	Great Britain	The ship was driven ashore near Whitby, Yorkshire.
Clyde	Great Britain	The ship was wrecked on the coast of Bornholm, Denmark.
Commerce	Great Britain	The ship was lost near Bornholm. She was on a voyage from Pillau, Prussia to Newcastle upon Tyne, Northumberland.
Diligence	Great Britain	The ship was lost on the coast of Cornwall. She was on a voyage from Waterford, Ireland to Southampton, Hampshire.
Diligence of Scarboro	Great Britain	The ship was lost near Danzig with the loss of all but two of her crew.
Dillon	France	The ship was lost near Dunkerque, Nord. She was on a voyage from Georgia, United States to Dunkerque.
Draper	Great Britain	The ship was driven ashore near Conway, Carnarvonshire. She was on a voyage from Ipswich, Suffolk to Liverpool, Lancashire.
Edward	Great Britain	The ship was driven ashore at Margate, Kent. She was on a voyage from Caen, Calvados, France to London.
Elizabeth	Great Britain	The ship was driven ashore on the Welsh coast. She was on a voyage from Saint Vincent to Liverpool.
Elizabeth	Great Britain	The ship was driven ashore on the Welsh coast. She was on a voyage from Lisbon to Liverpool.
Endeavour	Great Britain	The ship foundered in the Irish Sea off Dublin, Ireland while on a voyage from Liverpool to Ostend, West Flanders, Dutch Republic.
Expedition	Great Britain	The ship was driven ashore near Bideford, Devon. She was on a voyage from Dublin to Southampton.
Favourite	Great Britain	The ship was wrecked on the coast of Jutland.
Felix	Sweden	The ship was lost near Pillau. She was on a voyage from Marstrand to Pillau.
Fisher	Great Britain	The ship was driven ashore at Crinan, Argyllshire. She was on a voyage from Africa to Liverpool.
Fly	Great Britain	The ship struck a rock and foundered off the coast of Cornwall. She was on a voyage from Bristol to London.
Fly	Great Britain	The ship was wrecked near Boulogne, Pas-de-Calais, France. She was on a voyage from Plymouth, Devon to London.
Fox	Great Britain	The ship was driven ashore near Skagen, Denmark with the loss of five of her crew. She was on a voyage from Saint Petersburg to London.
Frederick	Dutch Republic	The sloop was destroyed by fire in the English Channel off Portland, Dorset, Great Britain. Her crew were rescued. She was on a voyage from Bayonne, Basses-Pyrénées, France to Amsterdam.
George and Mary	Great Britain	The ship was driven ashore in the Saint Lawrence River downstream of Quebec, British America. She was on a voyage from Jamaica to Quebec
Good Intent	Great Britain	The ship was driven ashore near Happisburgh, Norfolk. She was on a voyage from London to Blyth, Northumberland.
Good Intent	Dutch Republic	The ship was driven ashore and wrecked near Weybourne, Norfolk.
Henrietta Scott	Great Britain	The ship was driven ashore near Ulverston, Lancashire. She was on a voyage from Cádiz, Spain to Liverpool.
Hercules	Hamburg	The ship was driven ashore near "Schashorn". She was on a voyage from London to Hamburg.
Holbeach	Great Britain	The sloop was wrecked on the Dutch coast with the loss of her captain.
Holtham	Great Britain	The ship was wrecked on the coast of Jutland.
Hope	Great Britain	The ship was wrecked on "Studenland".
Hope	Great Britain	The ship was driven ashore near Great Yarmouth.
Ibbetson	Great Britain	The ship was driven ashore on Texel. She was on a voyage from Riga, Russia to London.
Industry	Great Britain	The ship was run down and sunk in Liverpool Bay. Her crew were rescued. She was on a voyage from Stockholm, Sweden to Liverpool.
Integrity	Great Britain	The ship caught fire and sank off Öland, Sweden. She was on a voyage from Saint Petersburg to Dumfries.
Jannette	France	The ship was lost near Granville, Manche. She was on a voyage from Saint-Domingue to Le Havre, Seine-Inférieure.
Jenny	Great Britain	The ship sprang a leak and foundered in the Bristol Channel while on a voyage from Cork to Bristol. Her crew were rescued.
Jenny	Great Britain	The ship was wrecked on the coast of Bornholm.
Jenny	Great Britain	The ship was wrecked near Cromer, Norfolk. She was on a voyage from London to Newcastle upon Tyne.
Jenny	Ireland	The ship was driven ashore near Dunkerque. She was on a voyage from Cork to Dunkerque.
Jenny	Great Britain	The ship was driven ashore at Dragør, Denmark. She was later refloated and taken in to Helsingør, Denmark.
Jessies	Great Britain	The ship was driven ashore near Ayr. She was on a voyage from Saint Petersburg to Liverpool.
John & Michael	Ireland	The ship was driven ashore in "Beaumans Bay".
Jonge Tobias	Danzig	The ship was driven ashore in the Baltic Sea. She was on a voyage from Danzig to Livorno, Grand Duchy of Tuscany.
Juffrouw Tabitha	Dutch Republic	The ship foundered while on a voyage from Bordeaux, Gironde, France to Bremen.
Kingston	Great Britain	The ship foundered off the coast of Jutland while on a voyage from Saint Petersburg to Hull, Yorkshire.
Kirkham	Great Britain	The ship was driven ashore near Ulverston.
Kitty	Great Britain	The ship foundered in the English Channel off Beachy Head, Sussex while on a voyage from Gibraltar to London. Her crew were rescued by Duke of York (Great Britain).
Laura	Russia	The ship foundered off Rügenwald, Prussia with the loss of five of her crew. She was on a voyage from Saint Petersburg to Barcelona, Spain.
Leith	Great Britain	The ship was wrecked on the Dutch coast. She was on a voyage from Leith to Amsterdam.
Les Deux Sœurs	France	The ship was lost near Barfleur, Manche. She was on a voyage from Lisbon to Rouen, Seine-Inférieure.
Liberty	Great Britain	The ship was driven ashore near Emden, Hanover. She was on a voyage from Hull to Hamburg.
Lord Longford	Great Britain	The ship foundered in the Irish Sea off Abergele, Denbighshire. She was on a voyage from São Miguel Island, Azores to Liverpool.
Margaret & Elizabeth	Great Britain	The ship was lost off the mouth of the Elbe. She was on a voyage from Saint Thomas to Hamburg.
Mary	Great Britain	The ship was driven ashore on South Holm, off Copenhagen, Denmark. She was on a voyage from Saint Petersburg to Hull.
Mary	Ireland	The ship was lost near "Laleste". She was on a voyage from Waterford to Bordeaux, Gironde, France.
Mary & Margaret	Great Britain	The ship was lost near Holyhead, Anglesey. She was on a voyage from Liverpool to Waterford.
Mary Ann	Great Britain	The ship foundered in Swansea Bay while on a voyage from Cork to Bristol.
Mary Ann	Great Britain	The ship was driven ashore on the Welsh coast.
Mary Ann	Great Britain	The ship was driven ashore near Gravelines.
Nancy	Great Britain	The ship was wrecked on the south coast of the Isle of Wight with the loss of all hands.
Neptune	Great Britain	The ship was lost near Dunkerque. She was on a voyage from Alicante, Spain to Ostend.
Neptune	Ireland	The ship was lost whilst on a voyage from Waterford to Brest, Finistère, France. Her crew were rescued.
Neptune	Great Britain	The ship was driven ashore at Dragør. She was later refloated and taken in to Helsingør.
Peggy	Great Britain	The ship was wrecked on the coast of Jutland.
Perseverance	Great Britain	The ship was driven ashore on Skagen, Denmark while on a voyage from Memel, Prussia to Great Yarmouth, Norfolk.
Phenix	Bremen	The ship ran aground in the Weser. She was on a voyage from Baltimore, Maryland, United States to Bremen.
Philadelphia	Great Britain	The ship was lost on the Dutch coast. She was on a voyage from Le Havre to Leith, Lothian.
Roseaway	Great Britain	The ship was lost at Annotto Bay, Jamaica. She was on a voyage from Jamaica to London.
Ruddy	Great Britain	The ship was driven ashore at Dragør. She was later refloated and taken in to Helsingør.
Sally	Great Britain	The ship was wrecked on the Middle Sand, in the North Sea off the coast of Essex, with the loss of all hands. She was on a voyage from Rotterdam, South Holland, Dutch Republic to London.
Sampson	Prussia	The ship was lost on the Dutch Coast. she was on a voyage from Memel to London.
Sholt	United States	The ship was driven ashore on the Dutch coast. She was on a voyage from Maryland to Rotterdam.
Snell Faane	Dutch Republic	The ship foundered in the North Sea off Ramsgate, Kent while on a voyage from Amsterdam, North Holland to Lisbon, Portugal.
Stanton	Great Britain	The ship was lost near Texel, North Holland. She was on a voyage from the Strait of Gibraltar to Amsterdam.
St François	France	The ship was driven ashore near Sandown Castle, Kent. She was on a voyage from Caen to London.
Thetis	Great Britain	The ship was lost near Hellevoetsluis, Zeeland, Dutch Republic. Her crew were rescued. She was on a voyage from Glasgow, Renfrewshire to Rotterdam.
Three Good Friends	Great Britain	The ship was lost on the Dutch coast. She was on a voyage from Cádiz to a Dutch port.
Thomas & Mary	Great Britain	The ship was driven ashore near the Black Rock, Lancashire. She was on a voyage from Málaga, Spain to Liverpool. f>
Tidstrom	Sweden	The ship foundered in the Baltic Sea. Her crew were rescued She was on a voyage from Lübeck to Visby.
Tobago	France	The ship was driven ashore at Ostend and was wrecked. She was on a voyage from Dunkerque, Nord to Tobago.
Trusty	Great Britain	The ship was driven ashore at Bideford. She was on a voyage from New York to Bristol.
Two Betseys	Great Britain	The ship was wrecked on the Dutch coast. Her crew were rescued.
Tyne	Great Britain	The ship was run down and sunk in the North Sea off Whitby. She was on a voyage from Hull to Newcastle upon Tyne.
Unity	Great Britain	The ship was wrecked on the coast of Jutland.
Vernon	Great Britain	The ship was driven ashore east of Ostend. She was on a voyage from Dunkerque to Tobago.
Vriendschap	Dutch Republic	The ship was lost on the Vogel Sand. She was on a voyage from Hull to Amsterdam.
Vrow Helena	Dutch Republic	The ship was driven ashore at Ostend.
Welcome Messenger	Great Britain	The ship was driven ashore near Scarborough, Yorkshire. Her crew were rescued. She was on a voyage from London to Newcastle upon Tyne.
William	Great Britain	The ship sank at Great Yarmouth. She was on a voyage from Wisbech, Cambridgeshire to Sunderland.
William & Nancy	Great Britain	The ship was driven ashore in Larne Bay. She was on a voyage from Larne, County Antrim, Ireland to Liverpool.
Williams	Great Britain Jersey	The ship struck a rock and sank at Jersey. She was on a voyage from Rotterdam to Jersey.
Yarmouth	Great Britain	The ship was lost in Riga Bay.
Young Murray	Great Britain	The ship was driven ashore and wrecked near Sutton-on-Sea, Lincolnshire.
Zeelust	Dutch Republic	The ship was driven ashore and wrecked near Ostend.
Unnamed	Great Britain	The brig was driven ashore near Wallasey, Cheshire. She was on a voyage from Boston to Belfast.
Unnamed	Great Britain	The sloop was driven ashore near Wallasey. She was on a voyage from Newry, County Antrim to Liverpool.
Unnamed	Denmark	The ship was wrecked on Saltholm. She was on a voyage Dantzig to Barcelona, Spain.

== Unknown date ==
List of shipwrecks: Unknown date in 1792
Ship	State	Description
Ann	Great Britain	The ship was lost near Gallipoli, Apulia.
Beaumanjaul	(France) French East India Company	The East Indiaman was lost whilst on a voyage from China to Bengal Her officers and 50 crew were rescued.
Berkeley	Ireland	The ship foundered in the Atlantic Ocean. Her crew were rescued. She was on a voyage from Londonderry to New York, United States.
Britannia	Great Britain	The ship was lost ar Saint Kitts. She was on a voyage from Saint Kitts to London.
Buona Concordia	Spain	The ship foundered in the Black Sea while on a voyage from "Cherson" to Barcelona.
Chance	Great Britain	The ship was lost on Glover's Reef.
Charlotte	Great Britain	The ship was lost at Grenada.
Charming Mary	Ireland	The ship was lost on the Jardines, off the coast of Cuba. She was on a voyage from Jamaica to Dublin.
Clement	France	The ship was lost at Saint-Domingue. she was on a voyage from Saint-Domingue to Bordeaux, Gironde.
Columbina	Great Britain	The ship foundered in the Atlantic Ocean. She was on a voyage from Newfoundland, British America to Vigo, Spain.
Columbia	Great Britain	The ship foundered in the Atlantic Ocean off Plymouth, Massachusetts, United States. She was on a voyage from Liverpool, Lancashire to Boston, Massachusetts.
Commerce	Great Britain	The ship was driven ashore and wrecked 42 nautical miles (78 km) south of Bic, Lower Canada, British America.
Commerce	United States	The ship was lost whilst on a voyage from Sint Eustatius to Boston, Massachusetts. Her crew were rescued.
Commerce	Great Britain	The ship was driven ashore on the Arabian Peninsula. She was on a voyage from Madras to Bombay, India.
Conception	United States	The ship was lost at St. Simons, Georgia.
Conception	Spain	The ship foundered in the Atlantic Ocean while on a voyage from Havana, Cuba to Alicante. Her crew were rescued by Nancy (Great Britain).
Diana	Great Britain	The ship was lost off the coast of Newfoundland.
Dolphin	Great Britain	The brig was lost at Jamaica. Her crew were rescued.
Eliza	Great Britain	The ship was driven ashore near New York. She was on a voyage from Jamaica to New York.
Eliza Partridge	Great Britain	The ship was lost on the Jardines. She was on a voyage from Jamaica to London.
Experiment	United States	The ship was lost at Cape Hatteras, North Carolina. She was on a voyage from North Carolina to New York.
Fanny	Great Britain	The ship was lost at Cape May, New Jersey, United States. She was on a voyage from Tortola to Philadelphia, Pennsylvania, United States.
Felicity	Great Britain	The ship was lost off the Turks Islands.
Foulis	British East India Company	The East Indiaman foundered, or was burnt at sea, whilst homeward bound.
Friendship	Great Britain	The ship ran aground at Grand Caicos. She was on a voyage from Philadelphia to Jamaica.
Garand	Great Britain	The ship was wrecked on the Cobler's Rock, Barbados.
George	Portugal	The ship was lost near Long Island, New York, United States. She was on a voyage from Madeira to New York City.
George and Margaret	Great Britain	The ship was driven ashore at Saint Kitts. She was on a voyage from Saint Kitts to London.
Good Intent	Great Britain	The ship was lost on the Jardines. She was on a voyage from Jamaica to London.
Grand Annibal	Great Britain	The ship foundered in the Atlantic Ocean off Bermuda. She was on a voyage from Saint-Domingue to Marseille, Bouches-du-Rhône.
Hamilton	United States	The ship was lost whilst on a voyage from Savannah, Georgia to Hamburg.
Hammond	Great Britain	The ship was lost whilst on a voyage from Jamaica to British Honduras.
Hercules	Great Britain	The ship was lost on the coast of Cuba. She was on a voyage from Jamaica to Liverpool.
Hercules	Great Britain	The East Indiaman was lost near Bombay. She was on a voyage from Bombay to China.
Holderness	Great Britain	The merchant ship ran aground on Holm Sand during a voyage from New York City to Kingston upon Hull. She suffered little damage and was refloated.
Indus	Great Britain	The ship was lost.
Isabella	Great Britain	The ship was lost at[Saint Kitts. She was on a voyage from Saint Kitts to Glasgow, Renfrewshire.
Jume Etiema	Great Britain	The ship was lost in the "Harbour of the Cape". She was on a voyage from Bordeaux to Saint-Domingo.
Kitty	Great Britain	The whaler was wrecked by ice in the Davis Strait. Her crew were rescued by John and Margaret (Great Britain).
Lark	United States	The ship was lost on Heneaga. She was on a voyage from Saint-Domingue to a port in New England.
Les Enfans Nantois	France	The ship was lost on a voyage from Saint-Domingue to Nantes, Loire-Inférieure.
Liberty	Great Britain	The whaler was lost in the South Seas.
Lovely Ann	Great Britain	The ship was lost on the Marteers. She was on a voyage from Jamaica to London.
Manacles	Great Britain	The ship was lost at Newfoundland.
Marietta	United States	The ship was lost at Cape Cod, Massachusetts.
Marlborough	Great Britain	The whaler was lost in the Davis Straits.
Mary	United States	The ship was driven ashore by ice at Bedlow's Island, New York. She was on a voyage from Amsterdam, North Holland, Dutch Republic to New York City.
Matilda	Great Britain	The whaler foundered in the Pacific Ocean six days' sail from Otaheite. She was on a voyage from Botany Bay to the South Seas.
Melampe	France	The ship was lost whilst on a voyage from Cayenne, French Guiana to Bordeaux.
Montrose	Great Britain	The whaler was lost in the Davis Straits.
Navarro	Spain	The ship was wrecked on Anegada, Virgin Islands before 12 August. She was on a voyage from St. Andero to Havana, Cuba.
Neckar	France	The ship was wrecked on the Hogsty Reef. She was on a voyage from Saint-Domingue to Nantes.
Nelly	Great Britain	The ship was driven ashore at Saint Barthélemy. She was on a voyage from Antigua to the United States.
Olive	Great Britain	The ship was driven ashore at Dominica.
Patriot	France	The ship was lost on "La Grand Inaque". She was on a voyage from Cap François, Saint-Domingue to Marseille.
Pitt	Great Britain Antigua	The sloop was lost at Ockracock, North Carolina, United States.
Polly	United States	The schooner foundered in the Atlantic Ocean while on a voyage from New York to Saint Barthélemy.
Polly	United States	The ship foundered whilst on a voyage from Charleston, South Carolina to Philadelphia. Her crew were rescued.
Princess of Wales	Great Britain	The whaler was lost in the Davis Straits.
Probitée	France	The ship was lost whilst on a voyage from Guadeloupe to Bayonne, Basses-Pyrénées.
Rambler	United States	The ship was wrecked on the "Isle of Sables".
Rodney	United States	The ship was lost at Cape Cod. She was on a voyage from Boston, Massachusetts to Saint Vincent.
Sarah	Great Britain	The ship was lost in the Gulf of Florida. She was on a voyage from Jamaica to London.
Sarah and Ann	Great Britain	The ship was lost at Nevis. She was on a voyage from Nevis to London.
Scipio	Great Britain	The ship was lost at Jamaica.
Sion	United States	The ship foundered in the Atlantic Ocean while on a voyage from New York to Amsterdam. Her crew were rescued.
St. Andrew	Great Britain	The ship collided with a brig and was abandoned in the Atlantic Ocean. She was on a voyage from Nova Scotia, British America to Grenada.
Three Sisters	United States	The ship was lost on Guana Kay. She was on a voyage from Charleston to New Providence, New Jersey.
Trois Soeurs	France	The ship was destroyed by fire at Boston, Massachusetts. She was on a voyage from Virginia to Morlaix, Finistère.
Two Brothers	United States	The ship was lost whilst on a voyage from New York to Philadelphia.
Wilkelmina	Ireland	The ship was lost near Cape May, New Jersey. Her crew were rescued. She was on a voyage from New London to Dublin.
William	Great Britain	The ship was lost on the American coast. She was on a voyage from Bristol, Gloucestershire to New York.
