= Martha (1788 ship) =

History

Great Britain
- Name: Martha
- Builder: Liverpool
- Launched: 1788
- Fate: Wrecked c.October 1806

General characteristics
- Tons burthen: 1788:141, or 149, or 165, or 170 (bm); 1796:243, or 250 (bm)
- Length: 72 ft 6 in (22.1 m)
- Beam: 21 ft 6 in (6.6 m)
- Complement: 1794: 20; 1799: 30; 1800: 25
- Armament: 1794: 10 × 4-pounder guns; 1799: 16 × 4&6-pounder guns; 1800: 18 × 4-pounder guns; 1805: 16 × 6-pounder guns + 4 × 12-pounder carronades
- Notes: Two decks and three masts

Martha was launched in 1788 in Liverpool. She made eleven voyages as a slave ship, carrying slaves from West Africa to the West Indies. On her fourth voyage, she and five other vessels bombarded Calabar for more than three hours to force the local native traders to lower the prices they were charging for slaves. After her last slave trading voyage in 1803, Martha became a West Indiaman. She was wrecked circa October 1806.

== Career ==
1st slave voyage (1788–1789): Captain Alexander Nicholson sailed from Liverpool on 28 February 1788, bound for West Africa. Martha gathered slaves at the Sierra Leone estuary. She sailed from Africa on 3 February 1789 and arrived at Grenada on 31 March with 227 slaves. She arrived back at Liverpool on 10 July 1789. She had left Liverpool with 31 crew members and she suffered 10 crew deaths on her voyage.

Martha first appeared in Lloyd's Register (LR) in 1789.

Year	Master	Owner	Trade	Source
1789	Nicholson; Huson	R.Fisher	Liverpool–Africa	LR

2nd slave voyage (1789–1790): Captain Thomas Huson sailed from Liverpool on 7 September 1789. Martha arrived at Jamaica on 22 September 1790 with 200 slaves. She arrived back at Liverpool 24 December 1790. She had left Liverpool with 21 crew members and she suffered six crew deaths on her voyage.

3rd slave voyage (1791-1792): Captain Huson sailed from Liverpool on 5 April 1791. Martha began gathering slaves on 6 June, first at New Calabar and then at Calabar. She sailed from Africa on 12 September and arrived at Montego Bay on 26 November with 242 slaves. She sailed from Jamaica on 18 December and arrived back at Liverpool on 10 February 1792. She had left Liverpool with 22 crew members and she suffered one crew death on her voyage.

4th slave voyage (1792–1793): Captain Thomas Taylor sailed from Liverpool on 20 April 1792. She started gathering slaves on 18 June, first at New Calabar and then at Calabar.

On this voyage Taylor, together with five other captains of slave ships, bombarded Calabar for more than three hours to force the local native traders to lower the prices they were charging for slaves. The bombardment by some 66 guns killed and wounded 50 or so of the local inhabitants and resulted in the traders agreeing to the prices the captains offered. (Note: The other five were Amacree, Betsey, Recovery, Thomas, and Wasp, Hutchenson, master.)

Martha sailed from Africa on 30 August and arrived at Kingston, Jamaica on 14 November. She had embarked 273 slaves and she arrived with 261, for a loss rate of a little over 4%. Martha sailed from Jamaica on 14 December and arrived back at Liverpool on 31 January 1793. She had left Liverpool with 20 crew members and she suffered no crew deaths on her voyage.

5th slave voyage (1794–1795): Captain Thomas Harold acquired a letter of marque on 3 January 1794. He sailed from Liverpool on 29 January. Martha left Africa on 18 February 1795 and arrived at Barbados on 19 March. She sailed from Barbados on 1 April and arrived back at Liverpool on 5 May. She had left Liverpool with 25 crew members and she suffered one crew death on her voyage.

Martha underwent lengthening in 1796.

6th slave voyage (1796–1797): Captain Thomas Harold sailed from Liverpool on 5 May 1796. Martha, Harold, master, arrived at Demerara 13 May 1797 with 362 slaves. She departed for Liverpool on 31 July and arrived there on 20 September. Although some records show her master as changing from Harold to Worthington, Lloyd's List ship arrival and departure data still show Harold as master on her return. She had left Liverpool with 26 crew members and she suffered five crew deaths on her voyage.

7th slave voyage (1798–1799): Captain Thomas Harold sailed from Liverpool on 8 June 1798. Martha gathered slaves as Bonny. She arrived at St Vincent on 26 October with 371 slaves. She sailed for Liverpool on 15 December and arrived there on 16 February 1799. She had left Liverpool with 34 crew members and she suffered no crew deaths on her voyage.

8th slave voyage (1799–1800): Captain Taylor acquired a letter of marque on 23 April 1799. He sailed from Liverpool on 29 May 1799, bound for New Calabar. Martha arrived at St Vincent n 9 November with 331 slaves. She left for Liverpool on 11 December and arrived there on 29 January 1800. She had left Liverpool with 35 crew members and suffered one crew death on her voyage.

9th slave voyage (1799–1800): Captain Phillip Henshall acquired a letter of marque on 21 April 1800. He sailed from Liverpool on 15 May. Martha arrived at Kingston on 31 March 1801 with 252 slaves. She left Kingston on20 May and arrived there on 18 July. She had left Liverpool with 32 crew members and arrived at Kingston with 30. In all she suffered four crew deaths on her voyage.

10th slave voyage (1801–1802): Captain Henshall sailed from Liverpool on 21 September 1801. Martha arrived at the Bahamas on 7 April 1802 with 249 slaves. She sailed from the Bahamas on 28 May and arrived at Liverpool on 10 July. She had left Liverpool with 33 crew members and suffered six crew deaths on her voyage.

11th slave voyage (1802–1803): Captain Henshall sailed from Liverpool on 1 September 1802. Martha gathered her slaves at New Calabar and Bonny. She arrived at Havana in April 1803 with 211 slaves. She sailed for Liverpool on 19 July and arrived there on 2 September. She had left Liverpool with 28 crew members and suffered 17 crew deaths on her voyage.

West Indiaman: After her eleventh slave voyage, Martha became a West Indiaman.

Year	Master	Owner	Trade	Source
1805	Hutchinson	Moss & Co.	Liverpool–Africa	LR; lengthened 1796, repair 1801, & good repair 1804 & 1804
1806	Hutchinson; W.Yates	Moss & Co.	Liverpool–New Providence	LR; good repair 1804 & 1805

== Fate ==
On 24 January 1806 Martha was at Milford where a brig ran foul of her, carrying away Martha's bowsprit and possibly springing her foremast. By 17 April 1806 Martha, Yates, master, was at Madeira, having come from Milford. From there she sailed for the West Indies. In October, Lloyd's List reported that Martha, Yates, master, had been wrecked at the Caicos. Her crew was saved. Four other vessels, names unknown, were also wrecked there.
