= Pijl =

Pijl may refer to:

== People ==
- Daan Pijl (born 2003), Dutch racing driver, better known as Daan Arrow
- Kees Pijl (1897–1976), Dutch footballer
- Kees van der Pijl (born 1947), Dutch political scientist and professor

== Bicycle races ==
- Brabantse Pijl (men's race)
- Brabantse Pijl (women's race)
- De Vlaamse Pijl
- Erondegemse Pijl
- Gooikse Pijl
- Waalse Pijl

== Other uses ==
- Dutch brig Pijl, a ship
