= George Buchan of Kelloe =

Secretary to Governor of Madras, Scottish church leader

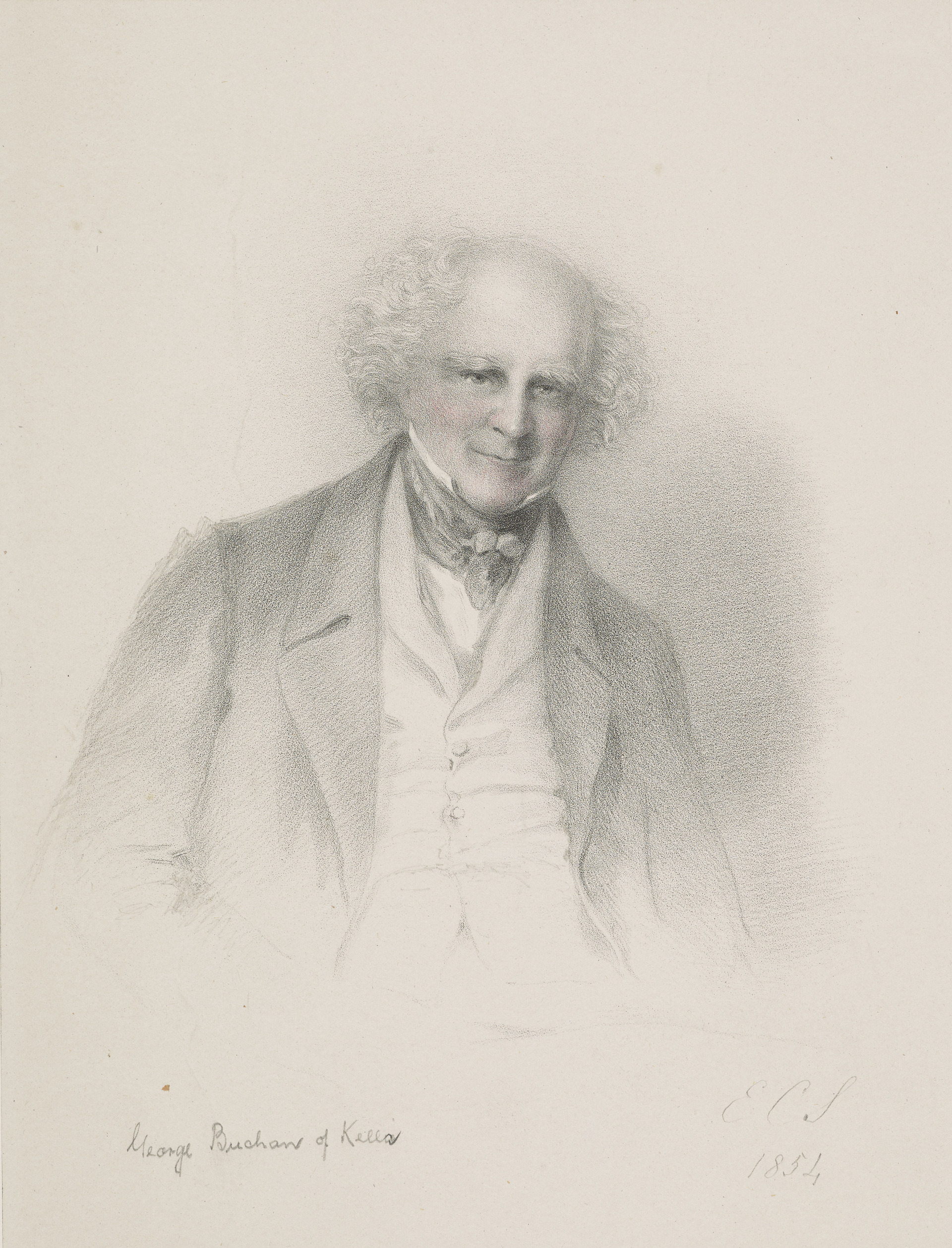

Personal details
- Born: 29 May 1775 Adam Square, Edinburgh, Scotland
- Died: 3 January 1856 (aged 80)

George Buchan (29 May 1775 – 3 January 1856) was a civil servant who was shipwrecked on his first passage to India as a teenager. Born into an elite family, his career progressed in the Indian Civil Service rising to the rank of Chief Secretary. Following his retirement, he came home to Scotland and had a Christian conversion. After several years as an elder in the Church of Scotland, he left at the Disruption and joined the Free Church of Scotland. He was an author writing about shipwrecks, Madras, duelling and church-state relations. He also wrote about God's providence illustrated from his own biography. Buchan was also an office bearer for a number of charity organisations.

== Ancestry and early life in Scotland ==
George Buchan, of Kelloe, was born on 29 May 1775, in Adam Square, Edinburgh. His father was also called George Buchan of Kelloe (born 21 August 1760) and his mother was Anne Dundas. Buchan's parents married on 5 April 1773. Excepting one who died in infancy, he was the eldest son in a family of seven sons and seven daughters. Of the sons, only General Sir John Buchan, lived to years of maturity. One of the daughters afterwards became Mrs Fordyce of Ayton.

Buchan's grandfather (1682-1760) was called George Buchan of Collegehead and Kelloe. Buchan's great-grandfather was John Buchan, a son of Mr Buchan of Auchmacoy, in Aberdeenshire, and was descended from the early Earls of Buchan. His grandfather owned the estates of Letham in East Lothian, and Kelloe and Cumledge in Berwickshire; and his father George succeeded to the Berwickshire property. His paternal grandmother was Christian, daughter of Sir Francis Grant, Bart. of Monymusk, in the county of Aberdeen. His own mother was Anne, fourth daughter of the Right Honourable Lord President Dundas of Arniston, sister to Henry Dundas, the first Viscount Melville, and sister-in-law to Admiral Duncan of Camperdown.

== Shipwreck en route to India ==
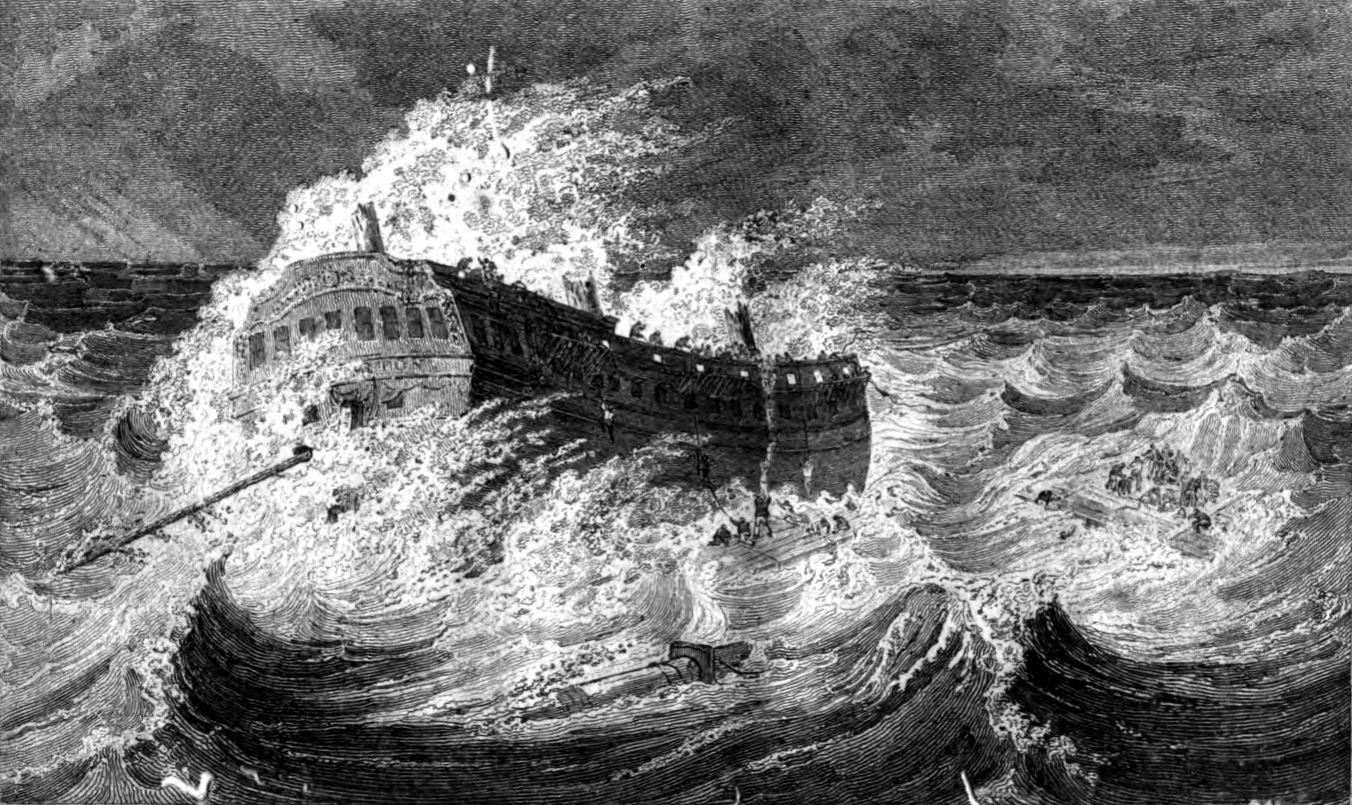
Winterton East Indiaman

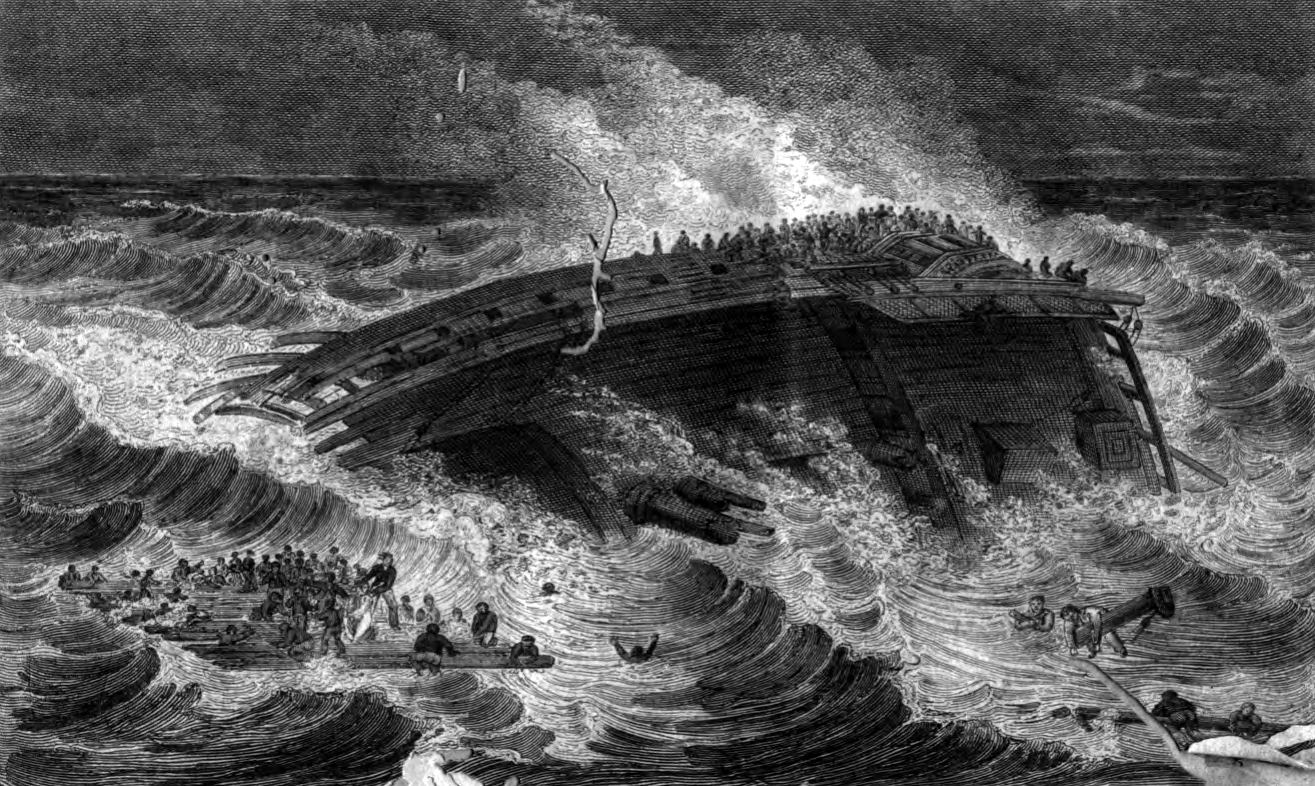
Winterton East Indiaman raft

When about fifteen years of age, Mr Buchan obtained an appointment in the Madras Civil Service, and sailed for that destination in May 1792, in the Winterton East Indiaman, commanded by Captain George Dundas. The voyage was a most disastrous one. On 20 August, after the Indian Ocean had been reached, the vessel, with 280 souls on board, was wrecked on a coral reef north from Augustine's Bay, on the coast of Madagascar. A narrative of the loss of the Winterton, with an account of Madagascar, was published by Mr Buchan in 1820, which contains a vivid and heartrending account of the loss of life involved in the shipwreck, and the sufferings endured by the hapless survivors.

Two days after the wreck, on the vessel breaking up, the captain and forty-seven others were drowned. Mr Buchan was thrown into the sea, the darkness of night adding to the horrors of the situation; and after having been twice washed from a plank to which he had clung, was providentially floated alongside part of the dismembered ship, which formed a raft, whereon were about forty of his companions, who drew him up among them. This raft grounded on an inner reef, and for four days they suffered fearfully from hunger, thirst, and cold: the blood and raw flesh of a live pig which had been on the wreck forming their chief sustenance. On the sixth day after the wreck the famished castaways were rescued by some native canoes; only to commence a toilsome week's journey on foot to Tullear, where the king resided. Mr Buchan had lost his shoes, and, to use his own words, “had all in life depended on it, he could not have gone many miles further.” Though kindly treated, it was seven months before an opportunity occurred of leaving the island, and during that time nearly a hundred of the survivors died. Those who still remained experienced a further delay of two months at Mozambique; and when near Ceylon they were captured by a French privateer, and detained three months more at the Mauritius, so that they did not reach Madras until January 1794, having been over twenty months on the passage.

== Work in the Imperial Civil Service ==
Buchan started work and later became chief secretary to the government at Madras in which office he served till 1809. He later wrote a book entitled "An Accurate and Authentic Narrative of the Origin and Progress of the Dissentions at the Presidency of Madras Founded on Original Papers and Correspondence". His service record is outlined in the Dictionary of Indian Biography:

- appointed a writer on the Madras Establishment, August 1792
- Assistant under the Secretary in the Military, Political and Scout Department, and French Translator, 1794
- also for supplying "beetle," tobacco, and "gangee" in 1795
- Paymaster to the Malacca expedition, 1796
- sub-Secretary in the above department, 1799
- Secretary in the Public and Commercial Department, 1801
- in the Military Department, 1801
- Chief Secretary, 1803
- Private Secretary to Government, 1809
- went home, 1810
- "out of the service," 1814.

== Return to Scotland, religious conversion and activities ==
Continued ill health and urgent private reasons then induced him to return to Scotland, when he took up his residence chiefly at Kelloe.

After his return from India underwent a religious conversion. The influence of Robert Cathcart of Drum, W.S., was, one factor in that and one work which he read at this time with absorbing interest, and to which he frequently in after life referred, was Lord Lyttleton's treatise on the conversion of Paul. After this conversion Buchan then joined his sisters in carrying out the works of Christian benevolence in which he found them engaged, and in promoting others on a large scale. Amongst these were the multiplication of Sabbath schools, himself taking active part as a teacher; extension of a valuable circulating library, and the wide dissemination of religious and morally wholesome periodical literature; also, at a somewhat later period, the establishment of a day-school at Kelloe House, and the maintenance of home missionaries in various localities. About twenty years before his death he accidentally fell into an ice-pit, and the severe dislocation which he then sustained occasioned lameness for life.

== Work as a Church of Scotland elder ==
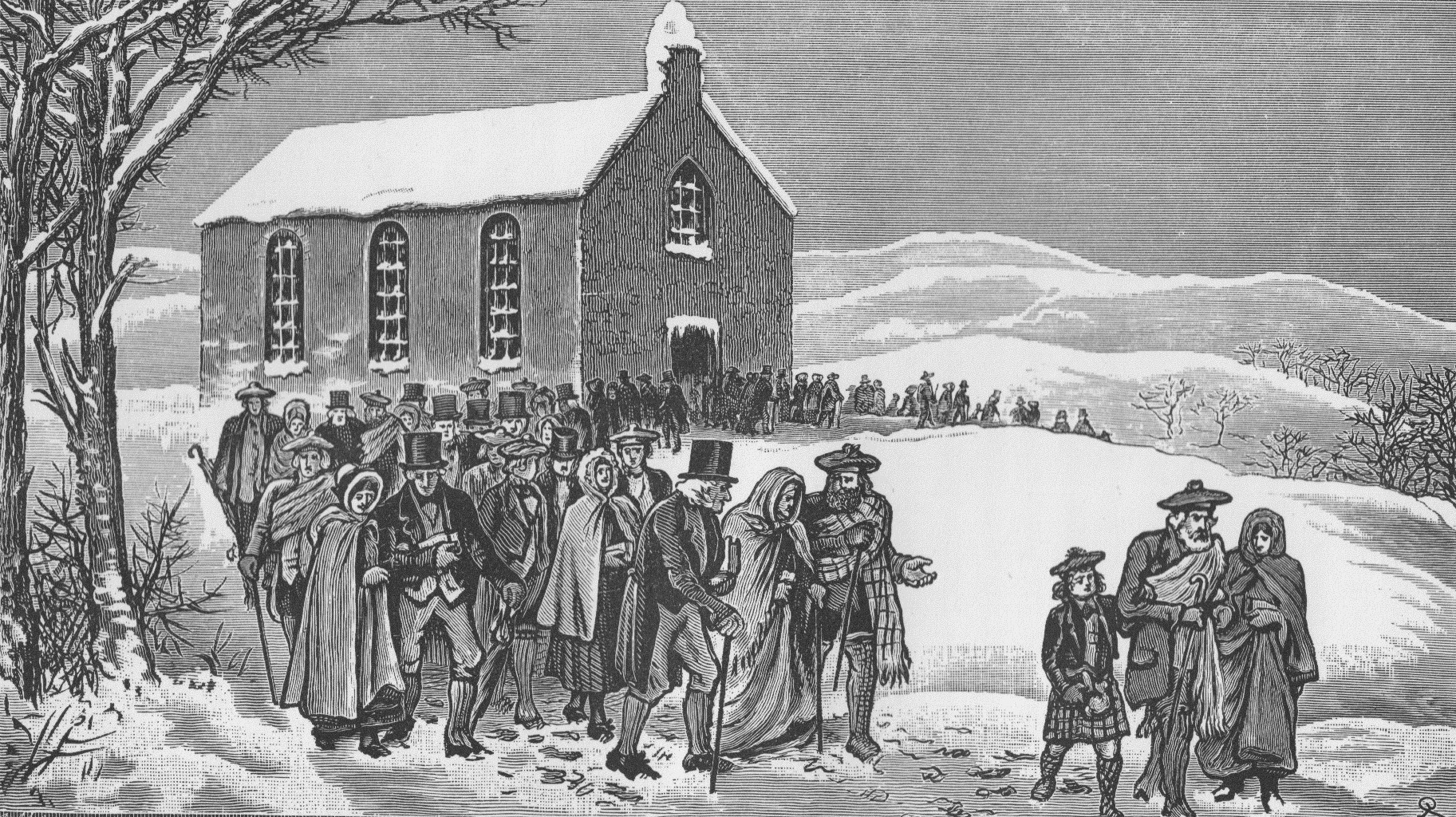
Parishioners walk out of church in protest at the unpopular appointment of a minister in the parish of Marnoch, Strathbogie in 1841

In 1825 Mr Buchan was ordained an elder in the parish church of Edrom. At Kelloe House evangelical clergymen of all denominations were frequent and honoured guests; and full advantage was taken of their presence to have meetings for prayer and preaching of the gospel in a large apartment within the house, and at various points on the estate. Among Buchan's attached friends and correspondents, were Hannah More, Mr Wilberforce, Dr Chalmers, and Dr Gordon.

For many years Mr Buchan was a member of the General Assembly of the Church of Scotland, and, as such, zealously supported the maintenance of spiritual independence in the Church. In 1841 he seconded Dr Candlish's conciliatory motion; also, he was sent with Principal Dewar and Mr Dunlop for the Commissioner, who was absent, when the deposed Strathbogie ministers attempted to serve an interdict on the Assembly. Though strongly conservative, and formerly favourable to patronage, if restricted;—yet in 1842 he seconded the motion for its abolition, decidedly holding that to preserve spiritual independence, both patronage and State connection must, if necessary, be given up. He had, in 1840, published “A Historical Sketch of the Church of Scotland,” a pamphlet, wherein are the following sentences: “The Church of Scotland possesses an inherent and indefeasible right of internal jurisdiction in all spiritual matters, derived from the supreme Head of the Church, the Lord Jesus Christ, a right which has been recognised by various statutes, especially those of 1567, 1592, and 1690.” Again, “The great point in our Church should be to recognise most distinctly, and maintain most firmly, the principle of non-intrusion; for if relinquished, the days of the Church of Scotland are certainly numbered: then would be an end of her character and stability as a national Church.” He held these principles to the last with unwavering decision.

Throughout the ten years’ conflict Mr Buchan's services to the Free Church cause were notable. His hospitable mansion at Kelloe became more than even formerly the resort of evangelical clergymen and laymen, especially those directly interested in the non-intrusion controversy. A severe accident which he sustained in being thrown from his horse prevented him from being present at the Disruption Assembly. In the Free Church Assembly of 1844, and again in 1845, he sat as a representative of the Presbytery of Dunse and Chirnside.

For many years Mr Buchan had been dissatisfied with the ministrations in his parish church; and, in consequence, he, along with others, carried out the erection of Boston Church at Dunse, in which from 1840 he was an office-bearer.

== Author ==
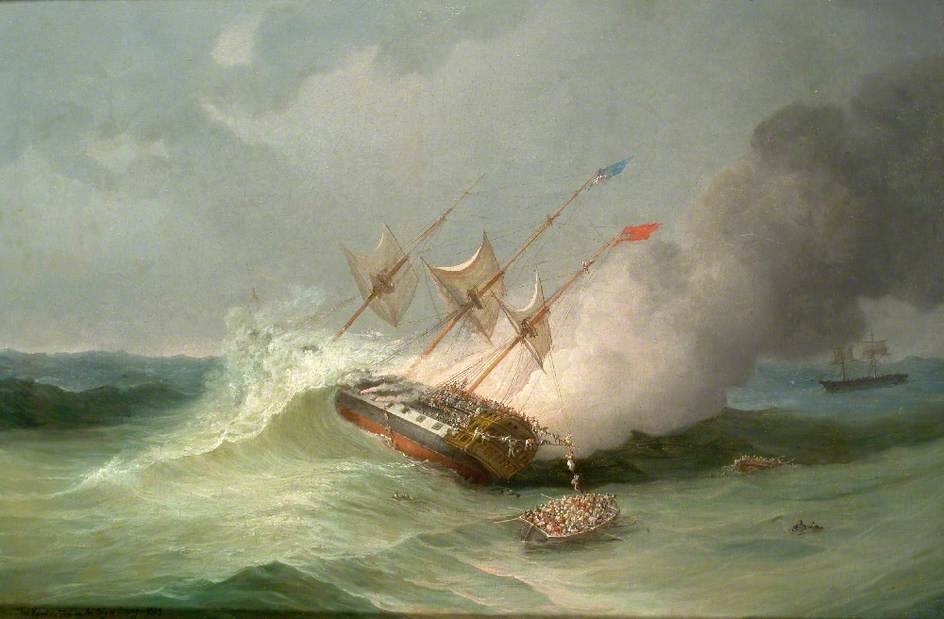
Burning of 'The Kent', 1st March 1825 (William Daniell, c. 1827)

Buchan was an author writing about Madras and shipwrecks as well as issuing three vigorously written pamphlets against the practice of duelling. His thoughts on duelling followed the trial of James Stuart of Dunearn who was acquitted following a duel that fatally wounded Sir Alexander Boswell. He also (in 1829) putting forth his sentiments in the form of a volume, entitled, “Practical Illustrations of a Particular Providence,” wherein his own remarkable experiences were devoutly referred to.

== Death, memorial and will ==
Buchan died on 3 January 1856, in the eighty-first year of his age.

His last days were spent with his sister, Miss Margaret Buchan, the youngest and last remaining member of the family, who only survived her brother six weeks. In the closing sentence of the inscription on a marble tablet to his memory in Edrom church, it is says “Zealous in every good work for the service of God and the benefit of mankind, his active benevolence and munificent bounty endeared him to the poor; while his rare mental endowments, his high-toned principle, and his consistency of character, obtained universal respect and esteem.

From 1813, when he entered on the possession of Kelloe, Mr Buchan took a large share in county business. In addition to the contributions made by him during his life-time, Mr Buchan, by his will, bequeathed a permanent annual supplement of £25 to the minister of Boston Church, £3000 to the Sustentation Fund, £1500 for Aged and Infirm Ministers, £500 for Bursaries, and £5000 for the Missionary Schemes of the Free Church.

== Charity work ==
Buchan was also an office-bearer for several charities including:

- Edinburgh Religious Tract Society (President)
- The Scottish Missionary Society (vice-president)
- Edinburgh Society for Promoting the Mitigation and Ultimate Abolition of Negro Slavery (Committee member)
