= Recovery (1791 ship) =

History

Great Britain
- Name: Recovery
- Launched: 1781
- Acquired: 1791
- Captured: 1797

General characteristics
- Tons burthen: 180, or 189 (bm)
- Armament: 6 × 3-pounder guns (1796)

Recovery was launched in 1781, possibly under another name. She first appeared in British sources in 1781. She made two voyages as a Bristol-based slave ship in the triangular trade in enslaved people. The first such voyage gave rise to a landmark court case. During the second such voyage she, together with five other slave ships, bombarded Calabar for more than three hours to force the local native traders to lower the prices they were charging for slaves. She then became a West Indiaman until the French Navy captured her in 1797.

== Career ==
Recovery's origin are ambiguous. Various sources give her origin as a British plantation (colony), America, an American prize, and Nova Scotia.

Recovery first appeared in Lloyd's Register (LR) in 1789.

| Year | Master | Owner | Trade | Source & notes |
|---|---|---|---|---|
| 1789 | Jn. Kimber | W.Jacks | Bristol–Africa | LR; good repair 1791 |

1st enslaving voyage (1791): Captain John Kimber sailed from Bristol on 10 April 1791. Recovery started gathering captives at New Calabar on 2 June. She left Africa on 1 September and arrived at Grenada on 28 October. She had embarked 304 captives and she arrived with 283, for a loss rate of 7%. She sailed from Grenada on 20 November and arrived back in Bristol on 22 December. She had left Bristol with 25 crew members and she had arrived at Grenada with 24. (She had taken on one man at Calabar, and she discharged one at Grenada.

Captain Kimber was tried for murder in 1792, after the abolitionist William Wilberforce accused him of torturing to death an enslaved teenage girl on the deck of his ship. Kimber was acquitted, but the trial gained much attention in the press. The case established that slave ships' crew could be tried for murder of slaves.

Recovery, Kimber, master, was on shore in the Bristol River in March 1792 as she sailed for Africa.

2nd enslaving voyage (1792–1793): Captain Kimber sailed from Bristol on 3 May 1792, bound for New Calabar. On this voyage Kimber, together with five other captains of enslaving ships, bombarded Calabar for more than three hours to force the local native traders to lower the prices they were charging for captives. The bombardment by some 66 guns killed and wounded 50 or so of the local inhabitants and resulted in the traders agreeing to the prices the captains offered. (Note: The other five were Amacree, Betsey, Martha, Thomas, and Wasp, Hutchenson, master.)

Recovery arrived at Falmouth, Jamaica on 3 November. She had embarked 321 captives and she arrived with 216, for a loss rate of 33%. She had left Bristol with 31 crew members and she had 29 when she reached Jamaica. Six crew members were discharged there. Recovery arrived back at Bristol on 28 January 1793. At some point Samuel Priez or Price, may have replaced Kimber as master. On her return she was advertised for sale.

| Year | Master | Owner | Trade | Source |
|---|---|---|---|---|
| 1796 | J.Souter | L.Jack | Bristol–Africa | LR |
| 1797 | J.Souter | S.Teast | Bristol–Africa | LR |

The Bristol shipowner and builder Sydenham Teast purchased Recovery. He traded with Africa, but directly, not via the slave trade. Recovery arrived at Cape Coast Castle on 26 September 1796 and sailed for England on 10 February 1797.

== Fate ==
Lloyd's List reported in July 1806 that Recovery, Suter, master, was one of four vessels that "Renau's squadron" had captured off the Windward Coast of Africa. (Note: The other three were Betsey and Ann, Bellas, master, Chollet, Lloyd, master, and Calypso, Dickens, master. The French ransomed Calypso. Chollett was on her first slave voyage and Betsey and Ann was on her second. Neither had embarked any captives. Calypso was on her first enslaving voyage too. Calypso, Dixon, master, arrived at Barbados on 1 June 1797 with 79 captives.)
