= Amacree (1788 ship) =

Liverpool-based slave ship

History

Great Britain
- Name: Amacree
- Namesake: Amachree I (d.1800), first king of the Kalabari Kingdom
- Builder: Liverpool
- Launched: 1788
- Fate: Disappeared from press reports after 1801

General characteristics
- Tons burthen: 205, or 212, or 215, or 229 (bm)
- Length: 88 ft 0 in (26.8 m)
- Beam: 23 ft 8 in (7.2 m)
- Complement: 1794: 15; 1800: 30
- Armament: 1794: 12 × 9-pounder guns; 1800: 18 × 9&12-pounder guns
- Notes: Two decks & three masts

Amacree or Amachree, was launched in 1788 in Liverpool. She made ten voyages as a slave ship in the triangular trade, carrying enslaved people from West Africa and primarily to Dominica. On her fourth such voyage, she and five other slave ships bombarded Calabar for more than three hours to force the local native traders to lower the prices they were charging for slaves. The last press mention of Amacree occurred in 1801.

== Career ==
Dolben's Act, passed in 1788, limited the number of enslaved people that British ships could transport, based on the ships' tons burthen. It was the first British legislation passed to regulate slave shipping. One of the provisions of the act was bonuses for the master (£100) and surgeon (£50) if the mortality among the captives was under 2%; a mortality rate of under 3% resulted in a bonus of half that. Dolben's Act apparently resulted in some reduction in the numbers of slaves carried per vessel, and possibly in mortality.

1st voyage transporting enslaved people (1788–1789): Captain Edward Deane sailed from Liverpool on 27 May 1788, bound for New Calabar. On 10 August Amacree, Dean, master, was well off the coast of Africa, with 100 captives. Amacree arrived at Dominica in December 1788 with 410 captives. (A source using records from Dominica reports that Amacree had embarked 510 captives, and delivered 407.) Captain Dean died on 12 December, at St George, Grenada, and John Sperling, Jr., replaced him as captain of Amacree. She arrived back at Liverpool on 8 February 1789. She had sailed from Liverpool with 37 crew members and she suffered four crew deaths on her voyage.

Amacree first appeared in Lloyd's Register (LR) in 1789.

Year	Master	Owner	Trade	Source
1789	R.Lee	Wm.Harper	Liverpool–Africa	LR

2nd voyage transporting enslaved people (1789–1790): Captain Roger Lee sailed from Liverpool on 16 April 1789, bound for New Calabar. Amacree arrived at Dominica on 16 September with 282 captives. (A source using records from Dominica does not have data for this voyage.) She sailed for Liverpool on 26 November and arrived back at Liverpool on 7 January 1790. She left Liverpool with 31 crew members and suffered two crew deaths on her voyage.

3rd voyage transporting enslaved people (1790): Captain Lee sailed from Liverpool on 20 April 1790, bound for Cape Grand Mount. Amacree arrived at Dominica on 5 October with 300 captives. (A source using records from Dominica reports that Amacree had embarked 336 captives, and delivered 300.) She sailed on 9 November and arrived back at Liverpool on 25 December. She had left Liverpool with 27 crew members and she suffered three crew deaths on her voyage.

4th voyage transporting enslaved people (1791–1792): Captain Lee sailed from Liverpool on 13 April 1791, bound for West Africa. Amacree started acquiring captives on 24 July.

On this voyage Lee, together with five other captains of slave ships, bombarded Calabar for more than three hours to force the local native traders to lower the prices they were charging for captives. The bombardment by some 66 guns killed and wounded 50 or so of the local inhabitants and resulted in the traders agreeing to the prices the captains offered. (Note: The other five were Betsey, Martha, Recovery, Thomas, Phillips, master, and Wasp, Hutchenson, master.)

Amacree sailed from Africa on 16 February 1792 and arrived at Dominica on 14 April with 406 captives. (A source using records from Dominica reports that Amacree had embarked 336 captives, and delivered 300.) She sailed from Dominica on 19 May and arrived back at Liverpool on 26 June. She had left Liverpool with 27 crew members and she suffered eight crew deaths on the voyage.

5th voyage transporting enslaved people (1792–1793): Captain William Platt sailed from Liverpool on 28 September 1792.

Captain Platt died on 11 October, (Note: The date of death comes from Stephen D. Behrendt, who places Platt on Venus, not Amacree. The database on trans-Atlantic slave voyages does not show Platt as master on Venus for any voyage transporting enslaved people. In February 1793, Lloyd's List reported that Bell had spoken Amacree, Pratt late master, off Madeira.) and Thomas Bourke replaced him as captain. Amacree acquired captives at Calabar and Bonny. She arrived at Dominica on 30 June 1793 with 217 captives. (A source using records from Dominica reports that Amacree had embarked 268 captives, and delivered 217.) She arrived back at Liverpool on 1 October 1793. She had left Liverpool with 27 crew members and suffered 10 crew deaths on her voyage.

6th voyage transporting enslaved people (1794–1795): Captain John Hewan acquired a letter of marque on 16 June 1794. He sailed from Liverpool on 8 July, bound for Loango. Amacree began acquiring captives on 27 September and departed Africa on 9 January 1795, having embarked 351 captives. She arrived at Havana on 26 March with 347 caaptives, for a mortality rate of about 1%, which would have qualified master and surgeon for bonuses. She sailed for Liverpool on 13 May, in company with Sarah, M'Gee, master, and Chaser, Galbraith, master. Sarah separated from Chaser on the 20th through the Gulf of Mexico, and from Amacree on the 29th, north of Bermuda. Amacree arrived at Liverpool on 4 July. She had left Liverpool with 34 crew members and suffered seven deaths on her voyage.

7th voyage transporting enslaved people (1797–1798): Captain Thomas Mullion sailed from Liverpool on 6 June 1797, bound for Bonny. In 1797, 104 vessels sailed from English ports bound for Africa to acquire and transport enslaved people; 90 of these vessels sailed from Liverpool.

Amacree arrived at Dominica on 25 December with 349 captives. (A source using records from Dominica reports that Amacree had embarked 431 captives, and delivered 349.) She left for Liverpool on 19 January 1798 and arrived there on 26 February. She had left Liverpool with 43 crew members and suffered one crew death on her voyage.

8th voyage transporting enslaved people (1798–1799): Captain Richard Kendall sailed from Liverpool on 14 June 1798, bound for Bonny. In 1798, 160 vessels sailed from English ports bound for Africa to acquire and transport enslaved people; 149 of these vessels sailed from Liverpool. This was the highest annual total during the 1795–1804 period.

Amacree arrived at Dominica on 28 November with 345 captives. (A source using records from Dominica reports that Amacree had embarked 426 captives, and delivered 345. She was the only vessel transporting enslaved people to arrive in Dominca in 1798.) She sailed for Liverpool on 10 March 1799 and arrived there on 19 April. She had left Liverpool with 47 crew members and suffered 10 crew deaths on her voyage.

9th voyage transporting enslaved people (1799–1800): Captain William Maxwell sailed from Liverpool on 1 August 1799, bound for New Calabar. In 1799, 156 vessels sailed from English ports bound for Africa to acquire and transport enslaved people; 134 of these vessels sailed from Liverpool.

Amacree arrived at Dominica on 27 January 1800 with 325 captives. (A source using records from Dominica reports that Amacree had embarked 402 captives, and delivered 325.) She sailed for Liverpool on 24 April and arrived there on 22 June. She had left Liverpool with 35 crew members and suffered seven crew deaths on her voyage.

10th voyage transporting enslaved people (1800–1801): Captain Thomas Houghton acquired a letter of marque on 4 September 1800. He sailed from Liverpool on 20 October, bound for Cape Grand Mount. In 1800, 133 vessels sailed from English ports bound for Africa to acquire and transport enslaved people; 120 of these vessels sailed from Liverpool. This was the highest annual total during the 1795–1804 period.

Amacree arrived at Martinique on 12 June 1801 with 211 captives. She arrived back at Liverpool on 27 September. Her cargo to Liverpool consisted of ivory, pepper, sugar, cotton, wine, "noyeau" (nuts), and succades. On her way back from Martinique she had to put into Cork, in distress.

== Fate ==
Although LR continued to carry Amacree for a number of years with stale data, she did not again appear in any ship arrival and departure data after her return to Liverpool in 1801.
