= Kelloe House =

Coordinates: 55.7719°N 2.2539°W

Kelloe House was a country house in the former Berwickshire, in the Parish of Edrom, in the Scottish Borders. The house has been demolished. Kelloe Mains and Kelloe Bridge remain.

== See also ==
- George Buchan of Kelloe
- Kelloe in County Durham
- Allanbank
- Allanton
- List of places in the Scottish Borders
- List of places in Scotland
