= James Stuart (1775–1849) =

Scottish politician

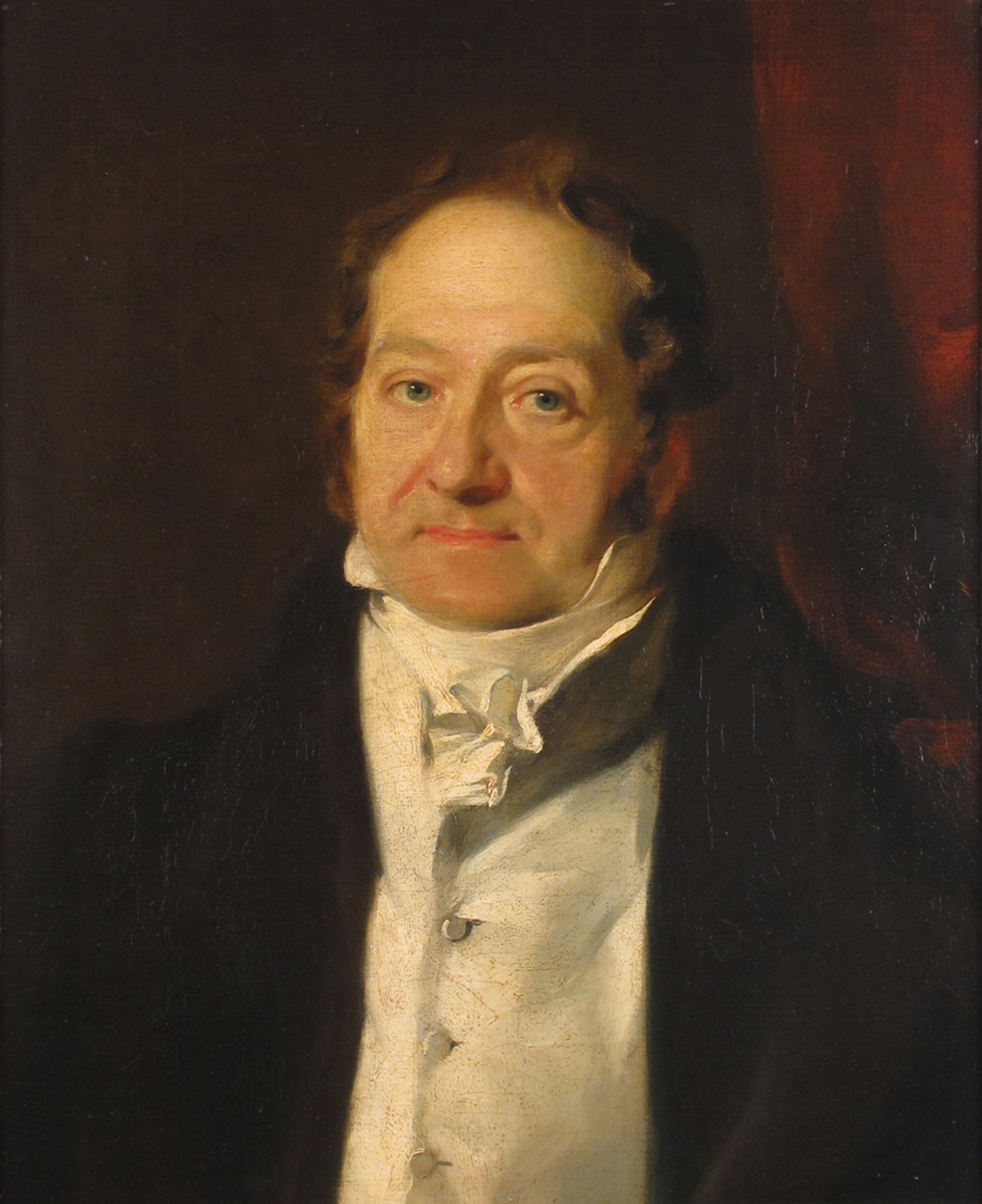
James Stuart by Daniel Macnee.

James Stuart of Dunearn WS (1775 – 3 November 1849) was a Scottish politician. He was the target of several personal attacks by opponents and participated in a duel that fatally wounded Sir Alexander Boswell.

== Biography ==
James was born in 1775 the eldest son of Charles Stuart of Dunearn in Fife, who was for some years minister of the parish of Cramond, and afterwards (1795–1828) a physician in Edinburgh. Charles' father, James' grandfather, was James Stuart of Binend, Lord Provost of Edinburgh. His mother was Mary Erskine, daughter of Rev John Erskine minister of Greyfriars Kirk.

James attended, it is believed, the high school of Edinburgh from 1785 to 1789. Having studied Law at the university of Edinburgh and served an apprenticeship to Mr. Hugh Robertson, W.S. in offices on the east side of George Square, James was admitted a member of the Society of Writers to the Signet on 17 August 1798. In 1800 he is listed as having premises at 16 Nicholson Street in Edinburgh's South Side.

He held the office of collector of the widows' fund of the society from 1818 to 1828, but "was more attached to agricultural pursuits than to those of his profession". As a deputy-lieutenant and justice of the peace he took an active part in county business, but his whig enthusiasm offended the authorities. In December 1815, when a new commission of the peace was issued for Fife, the Earl of Morton, then lord lieutenant, omitted Stuart. On 4 January 1816, however, a meeting of the gentlemen of the western district of the county resolved "to take steps for securing the continuance of Mr. Stuart's most important and unremitting services to this district," and he was reappointed. Some years later he had another difficulty with Lord Morton, who censured him for having, contrary to a regimental order, assembled for drill a troop of the Fife yeomanry, in which he was an officer. Stuart, who maintained that he had never seen the order, resigned his commission on 7 January 1821.

=== Controversy ===
Stuart was a keen politician on the whig side. On 28 July 1821 the Beacon, an Edinburgh tory paper, the first number of which had appeared on 6 January 1821, contained a personal attack on him. He demanded an apology from the printer, Duncan Stevenson. This was refused, and on 15 August Stuart, meeting Stevenson in the Parliament Close, assaulted him. Lord Cockburn simply says 'he caned the printer in the street,' but Stevenson and his friends said there was a fight, and that Stuart behaved like a coward. The personal attacks were continued in the Beacon, and Stuart entered on a long correspondence with Sir William Rae, then lord-advocate of Scotland, who in the end expressed his disapproval of the Beacon's system of personal attacks, and allowed Stuart to publish the correspondence. Soon after this the Beacon ceased to appear.

In the following year (1822) Stuart was involved in another and more serious quarrel with the tory press. The first number of a new paper in Glasgow, The Glasgow Sentinel, appearing on 10 October 1821, contained a virulent attack on Stuart. Similar articles followed in subsequent issues, and it soon appeared that he had been especially singled out by the conductors of the journal for abuse. Stuart raised an action for libel against the publishers, Borthwick & Alexander; but proceedings were stayed owing to a dispute between the two publishers. In the result Borthwick surrendered to Stuart at Glasgow on 11 March 1822 the manuscripts of the obnoxious articles. The author of the most scurrilous among them proved to be Sir Alexander Boswell of Auchinleck. The Earl of Rosslyn, acting in Stuart's behalf, vainly asked Boswell for an explanation. A challenge from Stuart followed on 25 March; but in the course of that night Stuart and Boswell were arrested and taken before the sheriff, who bound them over to keep the peace within the town and county of Edinburgh. It was then arranged that the duel should take place in Fife, and on the following morning the parties met near the village of Auchtertool, Lord Rosslyn acting for Stuart, and the Hon. John Douglas for Boswell. Boswell fired in the air; Stuart, who had never handled a pistol before, fatally wounded his opponent. Boswell died the next day (27 March). Stuart, on the advice of his friends, went to Paris, where he surrendered himself to the British ambassador. Returning to Scotland to stand his trial, he was indicted for wilful murder before the high court of justiciary at Edinburgh on 10 June. He was prosecuted by Sir William Rae, and defended by Jeffrey, James Moncreiff, Cockburn, and other whig members of the Scottish bar. At 5 o'clock on the following morning the jury, without retiring, found Stuart not guilty. "No Scotch trial in my time excited such interest," Lord Cockburn says. In the indictment Stuart was also charged with having conspired with Borthwick to steal the manuscripts from the proprietors of the Glasgow Sentinel. Borthwick had been arrested, but was released on the acquittal of Stuart. These proceedings were afterwards discussed at great length in parliament, and the lord-advocate, who had sanctioned them, escaped a vote of censure by a majority of only six. George Buchan published his own examination of arguments in favour of duelling alongside an account of the trial, taken in shorthand.

=== Later life ===
After his acquittal Stuart lived in Edinburgh, at 2 North Charlotte Street off Charlotte Square and in Fife at Hillside, "the grounds of which he greatly beautified", until 1828, when, his affairs being embarrassed, he resigned the collectorship of the widows' fund and went to America. Leaving Liverpool on 16 July 1828, he reached New York on 23 August. He sailed from America on 17 April 1831, and landed at Deal on 25 May. In 1833 he published "Three Years in North America" (2 vols.), an account of his travels, which attracted considerable attention. Two more editions appeared in the following year. Stuart displayed a strong bias in favour of the Americans, and he was involved in a controversy with Sir John Lambert and a Major Pringle regarding his account of the operations and conduct of the British army during the American campaign of 1814–15.

Soon after his return Stuart became editor of the (London) "Courier" newspaper. It was not prosperous at that time, and he tried to increase its popularity by publishing once a week a double number of eight pages, one of which he devoted entirely to reviews. He was editor until 1836, when Lord Melbourne appointed him an inspector of factories.

On 3 November 1849 he died of heart disease at the age of 74 in Notting Hill, London.

== Family ==
On 29 April 1802 he married Eleanor Maria Anna, only daughter of Dr. Robert Moubray of Cockairnie in Fife, but left no family.

== Bibliography ==
- Conolly, Biographical Dictionary of Eminent Men of Fife
- Records of the Society of Writers to the Signet
- Correspondence between James Stuart, esq., and the Earl of Morton, 1822
- Lord Cockburn's Memorials of his Time
- The Beacon, 1821
- Correspondence between James Stuart, esq., and the Printer of The Beacon, 1821
- Correspondence between James Stuart, esq., and the Lord-Advocate, 1821
- The Glasgow Sentinel, 1822
- the Trial of James Stuart, younger, of Dunearn, Monday, 10 June 1822
- Proceedings against William Murray Borthwick, with an Appendix of Documents, 1822
- Letter to Sir James Mackintosh, knt., M.P., by Robert Alexander, editor of the Glasgow Sentinel, 1822 (on the first page of the British Museum copy of this letter there is a note in the handwriting of Lord Cockburn, ‘A tissue of lies from beginning to end, H. C.’)
- Refutation of Aspersions on Stuart's Three Years in North America, 1834
- Grant's Newspaper Press, i. 363–6.
