= Nancy (1788 ship) =

British merchant ship (1788–1794)

History

Great Britain
- Name: Nancy
- Owner: 1789: Mulowney; 1791: Thomas Vaughn and Edward Wilcox; 1794: Thomas Vaughn and Edward Watkins
- Launched: 1788, Newfoundland
- Captured: 1794

General characteristics
- Tons burthen: 51, or 60 (bm)
- Complement: 9
- Armament: Two or four guns
- Notes: "Wood ship" – designed to transport wood from Newfoundland to Great Britain

Nancy was launched in Newfoundland in 1788. Initially, she traded between Bristol and Newfoundland and then Bristol and Lisbon. After a change in ownership in 1791, she traded between Bristol and Africa. The French captured her in 1794.

== Career ==
Nancy first appeared in Lloyd's Register (LR), in the volume for 1789.

Year	Master	Owner	Trade	Source & notes
1789	Illegible; Trousdell	Mullowny	Bristol–Newfoundland	LR
1791	Trousdale; E.Wilcox	Mullowny; T.Vaughn	Bristol–Newfoundland; Bristol–Africa	LR

Thomas Vaughn and Edward Wilcox started trading between Bristol and Africa. Nancy left Bristol on 6 June 1791 with nine crew members. Between 30 July and 18 November six of the crew died. Nancy returned to Bristol in the first half of January 1792 with only three crew members. She stopped at Padstow on her way back to Bristol.

On 12 May 1792 Nancy, Wilcox, master sailed from Bristol to Africa. She returned to Bristol on 22 February. Lloyd's List's ship arrival and departure data showed Nancy as returning to Bristol from The Gambia in February 1793.

Year	Master	Owner	Trade	Source & notes
1794	E.Wilcox	T.Vaughn	Bristol–Africa	LR

Nancy, Wilcox, master, sailed for Africa on 2 June.

Capture: In July 1794, Lloyd's List reported that the French had captured three Bristol ships on their way to Africa and taken the ships to France. The three were Catherine, Wilson, master, Thomas, Mentor, master, and Nancy, Wilcox, master. The date of Nancy's capture was reportedly 10 June; her captor sent her into Brest.
