= Chambers (1781 ship) =

History

Great Britain
- Name: Chambers (or Chambres)
- Launched: 1781, America
- Fate: Foundered 1792

General characteristics
- Tons burthen: 210, or 233 (bm)
- Length: 94 ft 10 in (28.9 m)
- Beam: 23 ft 9 in (7.2 m)
- Armament: 1783: 4 × 4-pounder guns
- Notes: Two decks & three masts

Chambers (or Chambres) was a ship launched in the Thirteen Colonies in 1781, possibly under another name. She was taken in prize in 1783. Chambers first appeared in Lloyd's Register in 1783. She traded between Liverpool and Africa, but is not listed as a slave ship. She foundered in 1792.

== Career ==
Th Vice admiralty court in New York City condemned Chambres on 10 March 1783.

| Year | Master | Owner | Trade | Source |
|---|---|---|---|---|
| 1783 | Js.Herd | Jones & Co. | Liverpool–Africa | LR |
| 1789 | W.Young | Jones & Co. | Liverpool–Africa | LR; new deck and sides 1787 |
| 1790 | W.Young; J.Berry | Jones & Co. | Liverpool–Africa | LR; new deck and sides 1787 & repairs 1790 |
| 1792 | J. Berry | Jones & Co. | Liverpool–Africa | LR; new deck and sides 1787 & repairs 1790 |

== Loss ==
In early 1792 Thomas was on her way back to Bristol from Jamaica having taken on board the crew of Chambers, of Liverpool, which had been foundering.

The Liverpool Registry on 19 November 1792 marked her as having been lost.
