= Thomas (1785 ship) =

History

Great Britain
- Name: Sally
- Owner: James Jones (Note: In the period 1789–1791, Bristol's enslaving trade was highly concentrated in the hands of a small number of firms. It was much more concentrated than the smaller trade in London, or the larger trade in Liverpool. James Jones dominated the trade out of Bristol, with about 26% of the tonnage employed. His brother Thomas accounted for about 14%. The top four firms accounted for 93.2%.)
- Acquired: 1785, Liverpool
- Renamed: Thomas (1785)
- Captured: After 6 June 1794

General characteristics
- Tons burthen: Originally: 174, or 198, or 200; 1791: 240, or 241, or 249 (bm)
- Complement: 40
- Armament: 14 × 4&6-pounder guns

Thomas was the ship Sally that James Jones acquired in 1785. Thomas made seven voyages from Bristol as a slave ship in the triangular trade in enslaved persons. On her fourth such voyage,Thomas and five other enslaving ships, bombarded Calabar for more than three hours to force the local native traders to lower the prices they were charging for captives. The French captured her in 1794 as she was on her way for her eighth voyage.

== Career ==
Thomas first appeared in Lloyd's Register (LR) in 1786, the volume for 1785 being unavailable online, if it even exists. Her entry noted that she had been Sally. Unfortunately, it is ambiguous as to which Sally she was.

Year	Master	Owner	Trade	Source & notes
1786	W.Vickers	J.Jones & Co.	Bristol–Africa	LR; almost rebuilt 1785

1st enslaving voyage (1785–1786): Captain William Vicars sailed from Bristol on 27 April 1785, bound for West Africa. Thomas acquired captives at New Calabar and then at Bonny. She arrived at St Vincent on 20 December. She had embarked 415 captives and she arrived with 373, for a 10% loss rate. She sailed for Bristol on 4 February 1786 and arrived there on 22 April.

Her owner, James Jones, testified to Parliament that on her first voyage Thomas had acquired 414–415 captives, and had buried some 10 or 12. She had left Bristol with 35 crew members and had returned with 15. She had arrived at St Vincent with 30 crew members and discharged 15 there. She enlisted one more crew member and had one crew member die on the voyage home.

2nd enslaving voyage (1786–1787): Captain Vicars sailed from Bristol on 1 June 1786. She acquired her captives at Bonny, and arrived at Tobago on 8 March 1787. She had embarked 410 captives and she arrived with 401, for a loss rate of 2%. Thomas arrived back at Bristol on 1 May.

Thomas had sailed from Bristol with 37 crew members and arrived at Tobago with 30. There she discharged three crew members.

3rd enslaving voyage (1787–1788): Although Captain Vicars was mentioned on the sailing clearance, Captain Thomas Phillips sailed from Bristol on 13 June 1787. Thomas acquired her captives at New Calabar. She embarked 409 captives and sailed to Barbados and St Vincent, arriving at St Vincent on 22 February 1788 with 402 captives, for a loss rate of 2%. She sailed for Bristol on 25 March and arrived there on 16 May.

Thomas sailed from Bristol with 35 crew members and arrived at Barbadoes with 16. There she discharged 14 and enlisted four. She arrived at St Vincent with 20 crew members. At St Vincent she discharged three crew members and enlisted three before sailing for Bristol. She arrived at Bristol with 20 crew members.

4th enslaving voyage (1788–1789): Captain Thomas Phillips sailed from Bristol on 8 July 1788. Thomas arrived at Cape Coast Castle on 29 August and sailed two days later for Calabar. She acquired captives at New Calabar and arrived at St Vincent on 28 February 1789 with 349 captives. She sailed for Bristol on 24 March and arrived there on 15 May.

Thomas had left Bristol with 36 crew members and she returned with 25. She had reached St Vincent with 27 of her original crew, discharged three there, and enlisted one additional man before sailing for Bristol.

This voyage and the subsequent ones took place under the provisions of Dolben's Act. Dolben's Act limited the number of enslaved people that British slave ships could transport, based on the ships' tons burthen. It was the first British legislation passed to regulate shipping of captives. At a burthen of 240 tons, the cap would have been 379 slaves. After the passage of Dolben's Act, masters received a bonus of £100 for a mortality rate of under 2%; the ship's surgeon received £50. For a mortality rate between two and three per cent, the bonus was halved. There was no bonus if mortality exceeded 3%. Dolben's Act apparently resulted in some reduction in the numbers of slaves carried per vessel, and possibly in mortality.

In 1788–1789, James Jones, Thomas's owner, had nine enslaving vessels at sea or on the coast of Africa. He estimated that the Act reduced the number of captives his vessels were allowed to carry by a number equivalent to 23% of the pre-Act total. For Thomas, the estimate was a reduction of 130 captives, from 520 to 290, or 31%.

5th enslaving voyage (1789–1790): Captain Phillips sailed from Bristol on 28 October 1789. Thomas acquired captives at New Calabar. She arrived at St Vincent and then Jamaica, with John Smith, master, on 25 May 1790, with 305 captives. She sailed for Bristol on 13 July and arrived there on 30 August.

Thomas had left Bristol with 33 crew members. She had taken on three crew members at Anamoboe on 5 January 1790 after six crew members had mutinied and had been transferred to Pomona on 1 January. She arrived at St Vincent with 21 crew members, and discharged two for mutiny. She took on two more men before she left Jamaica, and arrived at Bristol with 20 men, one having died on the return voyage.

She underwent lengthening in 1790–1791.

Year	Master	Owner	Trade	Source & notes
1791	J.Smith	Jones & Co.	Africa–Bristol	LR; almost rebuilt 1785, lengthened 1791
1792	T.Phillips	Jones & Co.	Bristol–Africa	LR; almost rebuilt 1785, lengthened 1791

6th enslaving voyage (1791–1792): Captain Thomas Phillips sailed from Bristol on 26 February 1791. Thomas started acquiring captives at New Calabar on 23 April. Thomas acquired 463 captives, 237 males and 226 females. Five men and four women died on the coast. Phillips relanded ten men and one woman, and trans-shipped 150 captives.

Thomas sailed from Africa on 7 September, and arrived at Kingston, Jamaica, on 9 November. Thomas had had left Africa with 293 captives and landed 280, for a loss rate of 4%. She sailed from Kingston on 20 December, and arrived at Bristol on 8 February 1792.

On her way back Thomas took on board the crew of Chambers, of Liverpool, which had been foundering.

Thomas had left Bristol with 35 crew members and arrived at Kingston with 30. Fourteen men were discharged at Jamaica and five new crew members were signed on. She arrived back at Bristol with 21 crew members.

7th enslaving voyage (1792–1793): Captain Phillips sailed from Bristol on 19 June 1792. Thomas began acquiring captives at Bonny on 4 August. She left Africa on 25 December and arrived at Kingston on 27 February 1793. She had embarked 368 captives and she arrived with 327, for a loss rate of 11%. She sailed from Kingston on 15 June and arrived back at Bristol on 3 August.

On her way home, Thomas fell in with Roehampton, which had become dismasted on her way to join a convoy. Thomas towed Roehampton into Grand Camanes (Caymans).

Thomas had left Bristol with 33 crew members and arrived at Kingston with 25. Sixteen men were discharged at Jamaica and seven new crew members, all French, were signed on. She arrived back at Bristol with 16 crew members.

On this voyage Phillips, together with five other captains of slave ships, bombarded Calabar for more than three hours to force the local native traders to lower the prices they were charging for captives. The bombardment by some 66 guns killed and wounded 50 or so of the local inhabitants and resulted in the traders agreeing to the prices the captains offered. (Note: The other five were Amacree, Betsey, Martha, Recovery, and Wasp, Hutchenson, master.)

Year	Master	Owner	Trade	Source
1794	T.Phillips; E.Mentor	Jones & Co.	Bristol–Africa	LR; almost rebuilt 1785, lengthened 1791, and repaired 1794

== Fate ==
War with France had broken out in 1793 while Thomas was on her way home. Captain Edward Mentor acquired a letter of marque on 19 April 1794. He sailed from Bristol on 10 June to acquire captives.

In July Lloyd's List reported that the French had captured three Bristol ships on their way to Africa and taken the ships to France. The three were Thomas, Mentor, master, Catherine, Wilson, master, and Nancy, Wilcox, master.

In 1794, 25 British enslaving ships were lost; 18 were lost on their way to Africa. During the period 1793 to 1807, war, rather than maritime hazards or resistance by the captives, was the greatest cause of vessel losses among British slave vessels.
