= Nine Sisters (1785 ship) =

English merchant ships

History

Great Britain
- Builder: Newnham
- Launched: 1785
- Captured: 12 June 1799

General characteristics
- Tons burthen: 208, or 250 (bm)

Nine Sisters was launched in 1785 in Newnham. She spent most of her career as West Indiaman, though she did trade with Petersburg at one point. A French privateer captured her in 1799.

== Career ==
Nine Sisters first appeared in Lloyd's Register in 1787.

Year	Master	Owner	Trade	Source & notes
1787	J.Gardner	J.Lockier	Bristol–Honduras	LR
1789	J.Gardner; Phillips	J.Lockier; Young	London–Honduras; London–Grenada	LR
1791	A. Phillips	C. Young	London–Grenada "Cl_"–Petersburg	LR
1793	A. Phillips	Young & Co.	London–Petersburg	LR

On 24 December 1793 Lloyd's List reported that Nine Sisters, Phillips, master, and Wildman, Concale, master, ran foul of each other in the Downs. Nine Sisters had been sailing for Tobago, and lost her bowsprit head. Wildman, bound for Jamaica, lost her jib boom.

Lloyd's List reported on 11 November 1794 that Nine Sisters, Phillips, master, had sprung a leak as she was leaving London for Jamaica and had to put back to Ramsgate.

Year	Master	Owner	Trade	Source & notes
1796	A.Philips; G.Wilson	Younger & Co. Hawksley	London–Tobago; Dublin–Jamaica	LR

Lloyd's List reported on 7 April 1797 that Nine Sisters had had to put back to Jamaica. She had left Jamaica for Dublin.

Year	Master	Owner	Trade	Source & notes
1798	G.Wilson	Hawksley	Dublin–Jamaica	LR; repairs 1797
1799	Wilson; Simpson	Hawksley	Dublin–Jamaica	LR; repairs 1797 & 1799

== Fate ==
In 1799 Lloyd's List reported that the privateer Hussar had captured Nine Sisters, Simpson, master, and carried her into Surinam on 12 June 1799. She had been on a voyage from Dublin to Jamaica.

Hawksley purchased another vessel, Tyne, which too was captured, this one in 1801.
