= Cadiz Dispatch (1785 ship) =

British ship merchant and slave ship (1785–1795)

History

Great Britain
- Name: Cadiz Dispatch
- Builder: Liverpool
- Launched: 1785
- Fate: Condemned 1795

General characteristics
- Tons burthen: 100, or 101 (bm)

Cadiz Dispatch was launched at Liverpool in 1785. Until 1791, she traded between London and Spain. From 1791, she made two voyages as a slave ship in the triangular trade in enslaved people. On the second she was subject first to a maritime incident and then to an unsuccessful insurrection by her captives. Still, she delivered her captives to St Vincent. She was condemned in 1795, at Tortola on her way home.

== Career ==
Cadiz Dispatch first appeared in Lloyd's Register in 1786, but with little information.

Year	Master	Owner	Trade	Source
1786		Captain	London–Cadiz	LR
1787	M'Carthy; E.Harris	Captain	London–Cadiz	LR

On 19 September 1788. Lloyd's List (LL) reported that Cadiz Dispatch, Harris, master, had developed a leak while at anchor in the bay. Some of the cargo was damaged. She was on a voyage from London to Cadiz.

Until 1791, she traded between London and Spain. Then in 1792, she started in the slave trade.

Year	Master	Owner	Trade	Source
1791	E.Harris; I.Higgins	M'Carthy; Joseph Burke	London–Cadiz; London–Africa	LR

1st voyage transporting enslaved people (1791–1792): Captain I. Higgins sailed from London on 1 March 1791. Cadiz Dispatch acquired captives in Gabon. She arrived at Saint Ann's Bay, Jamaica on 18 April 1792, with 140 captives. She arrived back at London on 7 July 1792.

Year	Master	Owner	Trade	Source
1792	I.Higgins; T.Baldy	J.Burk; S.Farmer	London Africa	LR
1793	T.Baldy	S.Farmer	Liverpool–Africa	LR

Cadiz Dispatch last appeared in LR in 1793.

2nd voyage transporting enslaved people (1792–1795): Captain Baldy sailed from London on 31 October 1792. LL reported on 7 December that Cadiz Dispatch, Baldy, master, had been on her way from Rotterdam to Africa and the West Indies when she developed a leak at latitude 46° 48' North. She had arrived at Plymouth on 4 December, but the wind was too strong for her to enter the harbour; she arrived at Portsmouth on 7 December, with five feet of water in her hold.

On 13 September 1793, LL reported that in May Cadiz Dispatch, Baldy, master, had 132 captives aboard who had carried her away, i.e., taken possession of her. It also reported that Baldy and his crew, the chief mate excepted, had been saved. The insurrection failed, but it is not clear how British slave traders regained control of Cadiz Dispatch. Apparently they did so while she was still in Africa. She received a new master and gathered more captives.

Cadiz Packet, Kitson, master, arrived at St Vincent from Africa in December 1794, with 158 captives.

In 1793, 17 British vessels in the triangular trade were lost, six of those vessels were lost on the African coast. It is not clear if this data includes Cadiz Dispatch as although her captives captured her on the coast, the vessel itself arrived at St Vincent, and was not lost until she was on the homeward leg of her voyage, and that to the perils of the sea. Still, during the period 1793 to 1807, war, rather than maritime hazards or resistance by the captives, was the greatest cause of vessel losses among British enslaving vessels.

== Fate ==
In June 1795, LL reported that Cadiz Dispatch, Kitson, master, was condemned at Tortola as she was on her way from St Vincent to London. The vessel and her cargo were advertised for sale.

Cadiz Dispatch's owners sued their insurers for the loss of the vessel. However, the insurers refused payment on the grounds that the owners had not complied with the requirement that they provide evidence from previous owners that the master, in this case Baldy, had made one prior voyage as a master, or two voyages as chief mate or surgeon. The court, on appeal upheld the insurers, and declared the insurance void.
