= Dutch brig Pijl =

History

Dutch Republic
- Name: Pijl
- Namesake: Arrow
- Builder: Amsterdam
- Laid down: 4 December 1784
- Launched: 19 May 1785
- Captured: 4 March 1796

Great Britain
- Name: HMS Pyl
- Acquired: 1796 by seizure
- Fate: Sold 1801

General characteristics
- Tons burthen: 200 (bm)
- Length: 80 Amsterdam feet (Note: All linear measurements are in Amsterdam feet (voet) of 11 Amsterdam inches (duim) (see Dutch units of measurement). The Amsterdam foot is about 8% shorter than an English foot. The basis of measurement is also different. The data is from Winfield and Van Maanen.)
- Beam: 25 Amsterdam feet
- Depth of hold: Dutch: 15 1/4 Amsterdam feet
- Propulsion: Sails
- Sail plan: Brig
- Complement: Dutch service:80; British service: Brig:70; Fireship:45
- Armament: Dutch service:12-18 guns; British service: Brig:12 × 6-pounder guns; Fireship:6 × 18-pounder carronades

The Dutch brig Pijl was launched on 19 May 1785 at Amsterdam for the navy of the Dutch Republic. Records exist of her escorting East Indiamen of the Dutch East India Company to Batavia, arriving on 12 February 1787.

In 1795 at the time of the Batavian Revolution the British Admiralty sent a messenger to Plymouth on 20 January 1795 to detain all Dutch vessels in Port. There were six naval vessels; Pijl among them. There were also six homeward-bound East Indiamen, three outward-bound East Indiamen, and some 60 to 70 other merchant vessels. Vice Admiral Sir Richard Onslow and the British Royal Navy took possession 4 March 1796. The crews were removed from their vessels and taken to prison ships. In September orders arrived at Plymouth that the Dutch naval vessels be equipped for immediate service.

The Navy named and registered Pyl on 25 October 1796, but never commissioned her. She was converted to a fireship in 1798, but never used.

The "Principal officers and commissioners of His Majesty's Navy" offered Pyl for sale on 24 August 1801. She sold 7 September for £765.
