= Betsey (1790 ship) =

Triangular trade slave ship

History

Great Britain
- Name: Betsey
- Builder: Liverpool
- Launched: 1790
- Captured: 27 February 1799

General characteristics
- Tons burthen: 190 (bm)
- Complement: 1794: 15; 1797: 25
- Armament: 1794: 10 × 6-pounder guns; 1797: 16 × 2&4&6-pounder guns

Betsey was launched in 1790 at Liverpool as a slave ship. She made six complete voyages in the triangular trade in enslaved people. On her second such voyage she, together with five other slave ships, bombarded Calabar for more than three hours to force the local native traders to lower the prices they were charging for captives. A French privateer captured her in 1799 after she had delivered her captives on her seventh voyage.

== Career ==
Betsey first appeared in Lloyd's Register (LR) in 1790.

Year	Master	Owner	Trade	Source
1790	P.Welch	Wm. Boats	Liverpool–Africa	LR

1st voyage transporting enslaved people (1790–1791): Captain Patrick Welsh sailed from Liverpool on 12 June 1790, bound for West Africa. On 17 July she spoke the British East India Company's packet Swallow at 5°31′N 17°0′W as Swallow was on her way to Madras and Bengal with the Governor and his suite. Betsey arrived at Kingston on 25 December 1790 with 303 captives. She sailed from Kingston on 24 January 1791 and arrived at Liverpool on 29 March 1791. She had left Liverpool with 27 crew members and she suffered three crew deaths on her voyage.

2nd voyage transporting enslaved people (1791–1792): Captain William Doyle sailed from Liverpool on 1 May 1791, bound for West Africa. Betsey began acquiring captives in Africa on 28 July, first at Calabar, then New Calabar, and lastly at Bonny. She left Africa on 23 October and arrived at Kingston on 27 December. She had embarked 305 captives and she arrived with 285, for a 7% loss rate. She sailed from Kingston on 24 February 1792 and arrived back at Liverpool on 13 April. She had left Liverpool with 29 crew members and she suffered two crew deaths on the voyage.

On this voyage Doyle, together with five other captains of slave ships (one being Amacree), bombarded Calabar for more than three hours to force the local native traders to lower the prices they were charging for slaves. The bombardment by some 66 guns killed and wounded 50 or so of the local inhabitants and resulted in the traders agreeing to the prices the captains offered.

3rd voyage transporting enslaved people (1792–1794): Captain Doyle sailed from Liverpool on 18 August 1792, bound for Whydah. Doyle died on 30 January 1793; Kent replaced Doyle as master. Betsey arrived at Kingston on 2 November 1793 with 150 captives, having come via Dominica. She left Kingston on 27 January 1794 and arrived back at Liverpool on 17 March 1794. She had left Liverpool with 31 crew members and she suffered 24 crew deaths on the voyage.

4th voyage transporting enslaved people (1794–1795): Captain John Corran acquired a letter of marque on 5 April 1794. He sailed from Liverpool on 28 May 1794. Betsey began gathering captives at Whydah on 28 August, and left Africa on 16 October. She arrived at Kingston on 7 January 1795 with 315 slaves having embarked 317, for a loss rate of less than 1%. She left Kingston on 7 March and arrived back at Liverpool on 30 April. She had left Liverpool with 30 crew members and suffered three crew deaths on the voyage.

After the passage of Dolben's Act in 1788, masters received a bonus of £100 for a mortality rate of under 2%; the ship's surgeon received £50. For a mortality rate between two and three per cent, the bonus was halved. There was no bonus if mortality exceeded 3%.

5th voyage transporting enslaved people (1796–1797): Captain David Armstrong sailed from Liverpool on 6 January 1796, bound for West Africa. In 1796, 103 vessels sailed from English ports on voyages to transport enslaved people; 94 of these vessels sailed from Liverpool.

Armstrong died on 11 May, and Edward Mosson replaced him as captain. Betsey left Africa on 1 August 1796. She arrived at St Croix on 22 September with 268 captives. She sailed for Liverpool on 28 November and arrived back there on 11 January 1797. She had left with 25 crew members and she suffered ten crew deaths on her voyage.

At the time Saint Croix was a Danish colony. In 1792, the Danish government passed a law that would outlaw Danish participation in the trans-Atlantic enslaving trade, from early 1803 on. This led the government in the Danish West Indies to encourage the importation of captives prior to the ban taking effect. One measure that it took was to open the trade to foreign vessels. Records for the period 1796 to 1799 show that 24 British enslaving ships, most of them from Liverpool, arrived at St Croix and imported 6,781 captives.

6th voyage transporting enslaved people (1797–1798): On 16 February 1797 Captain John Watson acquired a letter of marque. He sailed from Liverpool on 23 February, bound for West Africa. In 1797, 104 vessels sailed from English ports on voyages to transport enslaved people; 90 of these vessels sailed from Liverpool.

Betsey arrived at Demerara on 9 September with 313 captives. She arrived back at Liverpool on 17 January 1798. She had left Liverpool with 31 crew members and suffered one crew death on her voyage.

7th voyage transporting enslaved people (1798–1799): Captain Edward Mosson sailed from Liverpool on 30 March 1798, bound for West Africa. In 1798, 160 vessels sailed from British ports, bound for Africa and the trade in enslaved people; 149 of these vessels sailed from Liverpool. Betsey arrived at St Croix on 19 November 1798 with 311 captives, that she sold there. She had left Liverpool with 31 crew members and suffered five crew deaths on her voyage.

== Fate ==
The French privateer Zeliée, of 18 guns and 84 men, captured Betsey on 27 February 1799 as Betsey was sailing from "St Cruz" to Liverpool. HMS Melpomene captured Zele the next day in the Bay of Biscay. (Note: Zélé was a privateer from Nantes commissioned in December 1798. She conducted a cruise from December 1798 under René-Joseph Salaun until HMS Melpomene captured her on 28 February 1799.)

In 1799, some 18 British slave ships were lost; at least one was lost on her way home. During the period 1793 to 1807, war, rather than maritime hazards or resistance by the captives, was the greatest cause of vessel losses among British slave vessels.
