= Quaker (ship) =

Several ships have been named Quaker for the Quakers:

- Quaker (1781 ship) was built in America in 1774, possibly under another name, and may have been a prize. She appears in British records from 1781. Between 1781 and 1783 she sailed as a privateer and captured several ships, American, Spanish, and French. She then became a whaler, making four whaling voyages. Thereafter she became a West Indiaman. She was captured in 1795.
- Quaker (1793 ship) was launched at Tynemouth in 1793 as a West Indiaman. The French captured her in 1795 but in a process that is currently obscure she returned to British ownership. In 1797 she became a slave ship, sailing out of Liverpool. On her first slave voyage the French captured after she had gathered her slaves, but the British Royal Navy recaptured her. She resumed her voyage but before she could deliver her slaves the French captured her again. She returned to British ownership in 1805, again in an obscure process, but wrecked in December 1806.
- Quaker (1810 ship) was launched in Massachusetts in 1800, possibly under another name. She came into British registers in 1810. She was last listed in 1826.

== See also ==
- Accomplished Quaker (ship)
