= Bell (1788 ship) =

British slave ship 1788–1797

History

Great Britain
- Name: Bell
- Owner: William Harper and Robert Brade
- Launched: 1788, Liverpool
- Captured: Circa 1797
- Fate: Destroyed 1798

General characteristics
- Tons burthen: 148, or 168, or 220 (bm)
- Length: 76 ft 0 in (23.2 m)
- Beam: 22 ft 0 in (6.7 m)
- Complement: 15
- Armament: 10 × 6-pounder guns
- Notes: Two decks & thee masts

Bell was launched in 1788 in Liverpool. Between 1788 and 1795 she made five voyages as a Liverpool-based slave ship in the triangular trade in enslaved people. The French captured her in 1798 on her sixth voyage transporting enslaved people after she had embarked her captives. In 1798, the Royal Navy destroyed her.

== Career ==
1st voyage transporting enslaved people (1788–1790): Captain John Holliwell sailed from Liverpool on 30 November 1788, bound for West Africa. Bell started acquiring captives at Cape Grand Mount on 30 January 1789. She left Africa on 19 December 1789 and arrived at Dominica on 19 January 1790. At some point Thomas Oliver had replaced Holliwell as captain as Oliver was master when Bell arrived in Dominica. She had embarked 247 captives and arrived with 243, for a 2% mortality rate. The captives consisted of 134 men, 49 women, 30 girls, and 30 boys.

After the passage in 1788 of Dolben's Act, masters received a bonus of £100 for a mortality rate of under 2%; the ship's surgeon received £50. For a mortality rate between two and three per cent, the bonus was halved. There was no bonus if mortality exceeded 3%. (Note: At the time the monthly wage for a captain of an enslaving ship out of Bristol was £5 per month. That said, masters and surgeons received most of their income in the form of "coast commissions", based on the total number of captives they delivered, plus the income of the sale of two (or more) privilege captives.)

Dolben's Act, the first British legislation to regulate the enslaving trade. The Act limited the number of enslaved people that British enslaving ships were permitted to transport without penalty, based on the ships' tons burthen. At a burthen of 148 tons, the cap would have been 247 captives; at 220 tons, the cap would have been 380.

Bell left Dominica on 9 February and arrived back at Liverpool on 6 April. She had left Liverpool with 30 crew members and she had lost 12 on the voyage.

2nd voyage transporting enslaved people (1790–1791): Captain Oliver sailed from Liverpool on 21 May 1790. Bell acquired captives at Cape Grand Mount and arrived Dominica on 24 May. She had embarked 275 captives and she arrived with 246, for a mortality rate of 11%. The captives consisted of 147 men, 44 boys, 42 women, and 13 girls.

Bell sailed from Dominica on 8 June and arrived back at Liverpool on 24 July. She had left Liverpool with 26 crew members and suffered four crew deaths on her voyage. Between her arrival in Dominica and her arrival back in Liverpool, Bell's master changed from Oliver to Gilbert Rigby.

3rd voyage transporting enslaved people (1791–1792): Captain Rigby sailed from Liverpool on 21 August 1791. Bell started acquiring captives on 20 October. She started at Cape Grand Mount, continued at Bassa, but gathered most of her captives at New Calabar. She sailed from Africa on 14 January 1792, stopping at Annobón on her way. She had embarked 452 captives and arrived at Dominica on 10 March with 234, for a mortality rate of 48%. (Note: The data suggests a higher death-rate before departure from the African coast than during the Middle Passage. The embarkation number was greatly in excess of the Dolben's Act cap.) The captives consisted of 104 men, 86 women, 27 girls, and 17 boys.

Bell sailed from Dominica on 9 April and arrived back at Liverpool on 16 May. She had left Liverpool with 19 crew members and had suffered one crew death on her voyage.

Rigby's second mate was Hugh Crow, who would go on to be captain of several enslaving ships and be the supercargo on Kitty's Amelia, when she made the last legal enslaving voyage by a British ship. In his Memoirs, Crow wrote that Rigby had neither the firmness or the tact to command a crew, with the result that the crew became insubordinate.

Year	Master	Owner	Trade	Source & notes
1792	G.Rigby; George Foreshaw	Harper & Co.	Liverpool–Africa	LR; repairs 1792

4th voyage transporting enslaved people (1792–1793): Captain George Foreshaw may have been the master of record or the intended master before Bell sailed from Liverpool on 28 August 1792. However, Lloyd's List reported in February 1793 that Bell, Rigby, master, which had arrived in Africa, had spoken Amacree, Pratt, late master, off Madeira. (Note: Captain William Platt had died on 11 October 1792.) Bell, Rigby, master, arrived at Montego Bay on 24 August 1793 with 257 captives. At some point Captain John Richards replaced Rigby. Bell left Jamaica on 10 October and arrived back at Liverpool on 30 December. She had left Liverpool with 25 crew members and had suffered ten crew deaths on her voyage.

5th voyage transporting enslaved people (1794–1795): Captain John Richards acquired a letter of marque on 1 August 1794. He sailed from Liverpool on 26 August. Bell started acquiring captives at Calabar on 28 October. She sailed from Africa on 30 December, and arrived at St Croix 19 February 1795. She had embarked 351 captives and arrived with 348, for a mortality rate of 1%. She sailed for Liverpool on 22 May and arrived there on 19 July. She had left Liverpool with 30 crew members and suffered three crew deaths on her voyage.

At the time Saint Croix was a Danish colony. In 1792, the Danish government passed a law that would outlaw Danish participation in the trans-Atlantic enslaving trade, from early 1803 on. This led the government in the Danish West Indies to encourage the importation of captives prior to the ban taking effect. One measure that it took was to open the trade to foreign vessels. Records for the period 1796 to 1799 show that 24 British enslaving ships, most of them from Liverpool, arrived at St Croix and imported a total of 6,781 captives. Thereafter, it permitted foreign vessels to transship captives through Saint Croix.

6th voyage transporting enslaved people (1795–Loss): Captain David Thompson sailed from Liverpool on 24 November 1795. In 1795, 79 vessels sailed from English ports, bound for Africa to acquire and transport enslaved people; 59 of these vessels sailed from Liverpool.

Bell acquired captives first at Îles de Los and then at Rio Pongo.

== Loss ==
Lloyd's List reported in March 1797 that a French squadron under "Renier" had captured Bell, Thompson, master, Falmouth, Pearson, master, and Union, Galbraith, master, on the African Windward Coast. The French then gave Falmouth up to the crews.

In 1798, HMS Daedalus, HMS Hornet, and the letter of marque enslaving ships Ellis and Saint Ann were cruising jointly to find and destroy "Renaud's Squadron". (Note: Renaud was probably Jean-Marie Renaud.) Daedalus and Hornet destroyed Bell, and did some damage to the town and fort at Gorée.

In 1796, 22 British enslaving vessels were lost, five on the coast. In 1797, 40 were lost, 14 of them on the coast. In 1796, 103 vessels left British ports on enslaving voyages; for 1798 the number was 104. This puts the loss rates at 21% or 38%, respectively.

One estimate puts the Dolben's Act cap on Bell at 347 captives, though it is unknown how many were actually aboard at the time of capture. During the period 1793 to 1807, war, rather than maritime hazards or resistance by the captives, was the greatest cause of vessel losses among British enslaving vessels.
