= Accomplished Quaker (ship) =

Several vessels were named Accomplished Quaker in the late 18th and early 19th Century. Owners of slave ships sometimes named their vessels Accomplished Quaker (British), or Willing Quaker (United States), or just Quaker (British) e.g. Quaker, as a barb aimed at the Quaker-led Society for Effecting the Abolition of the Slave Trade and the role of the Quakers in the movement to abolish the slave trade.

- Accomplished Quaker (1795 ship) was a French vessel launched in 1789 and captured by the British circa 1795. She became a Liverpool slave ship, engaged in the triangular trade in enslaved people. A French privateer captured Accomplished Quaker and took her into Gorée before she could gather any slaves.
- Accomplished Quaker (1801 ship) was a French vessel of 190 tons (bm) that the British captured circa 1801. As she was sailing from Archangel to London she wrecked near Drontheim. Her crew was saved.
