= Falmouth =

Falmouth may refer to:

== Places ==
=== Antigua ===
- Falmouth, Antigua and Barbuda
- Falmouth Harbour, Antigua

=== Australia ===
- Falmouth, Tasmania, a locality in North-east Tasmania

=== Canada ===
- Falmouth, Nova Scotia, a community in Hants County
- Upper Falmouth, Nova Scotia

=== Jamaica ===
- Falmouth, Jamaica, the capital of Trelawny Parish

=== United Kingdom ===
- Falmouth, Cornwall, the original Falmouth from which most of the others are named

=== United States ===
- Falmouth, Florida
  - Falmouth Spring, a first-magnitude spring in Suwannee County, Florida
- Falmouth, Indiana
- Falmouth, Kentucky
- Falmouth, Maine, a New England town
  - Falmouth (CDP), Maine, a village in the town
- Portland, Maine (then part of Massachusetts), called Falmouth from 1658-1786
- Falmouth, Massachusetts, a New England town
  - Falmouth (CDP), Massachusetts, a village in the town
- Falmouth, Michigan
- Falmouth, Pennsylvania
- Falmouth, Virginia

== Ships ==
- Falmouth (ship) several ships of that name
  - HMS Falmouth, several ships of the British Royal Navy
  - USS Falmouth (1827), a United States navy sloop-of-war in commission from 1828 to 1859
