= HMS Pickle (1801) =

History

France
- Name: Éclair
- Builder: Louis, Antoine, & Mathurin Crucy, Nantes, to a design by Pierre Ozanne
- Laid down: May 1799
- Launched: 23 September 1799
- Fate: Captured, 17 January 1801

United Kingdom
- Name: HMS Eclair (1801-1809)
- Acquired: by capture, 17 January 1801
- Commissioned: 1801
- Decommissioned: 1816
- Renamed: HMS Pickle (1809-1818)
- Fate: Sold, 11 June 1818

General characteristics
- Type: Télégraphe-class
- Displacement: 107 tons (French), or 70
- Tons burthen: 145 (bm)
- Length: 25 m (82 ft) (overall), 24 m (79 ft) (keel)
- Beam: 6 m (20 ft)
- Sail plan: Schooner
- Complement: 55 (in French service)
- Armament: Originally:18 x swivel guns; August 1800: 2 × long 4-pounder guns & 14 × 1-pounder brass swivels; At capture: 4 × long 4-pounder guns & 20 × 1½-pounder brass swivels; British service:12 × 12-pounder carronades

HMS Pickle (formerly Eclair) was a French Navy schooner launched in 1799 and captured in 1801. The British took her into service under her French name and armed her with twelve 12-pounder carronades. In 1804 she engaged in a noteworthy, albeit indecisive single ship action with the 22-gun French privateer Grande Decide. In 1809 she was renamed Pickle. In December 1812 she and three other small British vessels engaged the French 40-gun frigate Gloire in another noteworthy and indecisive action. She was sold in 1818.

== Origins and capture ==
Éclair was the sixth of Pierre Ozanne's Télégraphe-class schooners. Her commanding officer was ensiegne de vaisseau Sougé. Under Sougé's command she sailed from Rochfort to Basse-Terre.

On 15 January 1801, while the 20-gun post-ship Daphne, Captain Richard Matson, 18-gun ship-sloops Cyane and Hornet, Captains Henry Matson and James Nash, and schooner Garland (tender to Daphne), were at anchor in the harbour of the Saintes, they observed a convoy of French coasters, escorted by an armed schooner, sailing towards Vieux-Fort, Guadeloupe. At midnight Garland, accompanied by two boats from each of the three ships, under the command of Lieutenants Kenneth Mackenzie of Daphne and Francis Peachey of Cyane, sailed to engage the convoy. The convoy's vessels, however, except one, succeeded in getting under the guns of Basse-terre. The British were able to board and carry off one vessel, which had anchored near Vieux-Fort, despite a heavy but apparently harmless cannonade.

Two days later, in the afternoon, the British observed the French schooner Éclair, of four long 4-pounders, twenty 1½ pounder brass swivels, and 45 men, the escort of the convoy in question, put into Trois-Rivières, and anchor under the protection of one principal battery and two smaller flanking ones. Lieutenants Mackenzie and Peachey volunteered to attempt to cut her out. For this purpose Mackenzie, with 25 seamen and marines, went on board Garland. The next day, 18 January, which was as early as the breeze would permit, Garland ran alongside Éclair and Lieutenants Mackenzie and Peachey, with 30 men, boarded and carried the French schooner in the face of the batteries.

Garland lost one seaman and one marine killed, and a sergeant of marines and two seamen wounded. Éclair lost one seaman killed, two drowned, and her captain, first and second lieutenants, and six men wounded.

Éclair carried only four guns but was pierced for 12 and was large enough to carry that many cannon. She was on her way to Pointe Petre to complete her armament of twelve 6-pounders and 20 brass swivels. The British took her into service under her existing name and armed her with twelve 12-pounder carronades. Mackenzie became Eclair's first British commander.

== HMS Eclair ==
In March 1801 Eclair took part in the attack on the islands of St Bartholomew and Saint Martin, led by Rear-Admiral Duckworth and Lieutenant-General Thomas Trigge. On 20 March, after the capture of St Bartholomew, Duckworth sent Drake and Eclair to investigate ten vessels that were approaching. Although it took a while, the ten vessels proved to be the troopships from England that Duckworth expected. They had, following Duckworth's orders, landed their sick and the women and children at Barbados before joining him. These reinforcements enabled Duckworth to attack St. Martin on 24 March.

In 1803 Eclair was under the command of Lieutenant William Carr, in the West Indies. On 6 August she was off Dominica when she chased two row-boat privateers from Guadaloupe until she was becalmed. She was able to capture one of them, which was the government sloop of the island. Eclair's jolly-boat, with only six men aboard, including Eclair's master and a young midshipman, attacked the second rowboat, which had 16 well-armed men aboard. The British succeeded in capturing their quarry within a few minutes, after killing her commander and one man, and wounding three, without sustaining any casualties of their own.

In August Eclair captured two vessels. On 14 August she captured the Spanish armed schooner Maria, which was carrying provisions, silks and gunpowder. Then on 29 August Eclair captured the Swedish ship Little John and her cargo of sugar and cotton.

On 10 February 1804 Eclair was 200 miles north of Tortola, returning from having escorted a packet on 5 February, when she pursued and caught up with a strange vessel. The two ships engaged for three-quarters of an hour, exchanging broadsides and small arms fire. However, when it became clear that Carr was preparing to attempt to board, the French vessel ceased firing and sailed away to the north. Eclair attempted to pursue but she had lost too much of her rigging in the action. Her casualties were one marine killed and four seamen wounded. The French vessel turned out to have been the privateer Grande Decide, Captain Mathieu Goy, of 22 long 8-pounders and a complement, including 80 soldiers, of about 220 men. John William Norie wrote, "This may be considered as one of the most brilliant and gallant exploits in naval history."

On 5 March Eclair sighted a schooner sailing towards La Hayes, Guadeloupe, where she could shelter under the guns of the battery there. Eclair's master, Mr John Salmon, and the surgeon, Mr John B. Douglas, and 10 men volunteered to take a boat and form a boarding party. As their boat entered the harbour both the vessel and the battery opened fire on them. Still, they managed to board and capture the schooner in ten minutes. In capturing her they killed five of her crew of 50 and wounded ten, while suffering no casualties of their own. The wounded included the captain and four men that jumped overboard. The battery continued to fire on the boarding party as they towed and rowed out their prize using sweeps. The schooner turned out to be the privateer Rose, which was armed with one long brass 9-pounder gun and had provisions for a three-month cruise having only just set out.

On 25 June 1804, Eclair captured a Swedish galliot carrying French passengers and property. In August Eclair captured the French sloop Try again, which was carrying provisions. In December 1804 Eclair was under the command of Lieutenant Joseph Beckett, after Carr had transferred to Netley in October.

In 1805, Eclair was under the command of Lieutenant George James Evelyn, in the Leeward Islands. On 5 April he recaptured the English ship Heroine, from London, and her cargo of dry goods. Eclair and Osprey shared in the capture, on 25 November, of the schooner, Henrietta Adelaide. (Note: The prize money for Henrietta Adelaide for a seaman was 16s 9¼d.)

On 9 June 1807, off Point Cedar, Eclair's cutter, with six men under the command of a midshipman, captured a Spanish armed rowboat. After an hour's heavy fighting the ten-man crew of the rowboat escaped ashore. On 20 July Eclair was in company with Surinam and Shannon when they captured Comet.

Also in 1807, Eclair encountered the French three-masted privateer schooner Felicité. Evelyn captured her prize, and then brought the privateer to action. During the engagement Eclair had one man killed and four wounded, including Evelyn, before Felicité was able to escape.

Almost a year later, on 20 June 1808, Eclair captured Franchise, another rowboat privateer. Franchise had 23 men on board, armed with small arms. On 27 November, Eclair captured Fair American. (Note: A first-class share of the prize money was worth £47 16s 1½d; a sixth-class share was worth £2 4s 9¾d.) On the same day she and Haughty captured Ocean. (Note: Even though two vessels were sharing, a first-class share was worth £78 13s 4d; a sixth-class share was worth £3 13s 9d. A second distribution of prize money for Fair American took place in September 1816. This represented money held back against any claims to the prize by Haughty. A first-class share was worth £47 16s 1d; a sixth-class share was worth £2 0s 9d.)

Eclair also captured the merchant vessel Grand Duc de Berg on 27 September. (Grand Duc de Berg was the former Falmouth Post Office Packet Service packet Duke of Montrose, which the French had captured some six months earlier. The privateer Grand Duc de Berg continued to sail for several more years.) Head money was finally paid in April 1829. (Note: A first-class share was worth £31 4s 0½d; a sixth-class share was worth 9s 5¼d.)

On 30 January 1809, Eclair assisted with the landing of British troops at Bay Robert, Basse Terre. The naval force there was under the command of Captain Philip Beaver of Acasta. In 1847 the Admiralty awarded the Naval General Service Medal with clasp "Martinique" to all surviving claimants from the campaign. On 8 February 1809, Evelyn assumed command of Swaggerer. (Note: The notice in the London Gazette does not list Eclair among the vessels whose crews qualified for the medal. However, other, fuller accounts do.)

== HMS Pickle ==
In May 1809 the Admiralty renamed her Pickle, the famous schooner Pickle having been recently lost, and the Cruizer-class brig-sloop Eclair having been launched and commissioned in 1807, and commissioned her under Lieutenant Goodwin. However, by June she was under the perhaps temporary command of Lieutenant J.G.(?) Evelyn, who on 11 June sailed for Portugal. (Note: There is some doubt about this. By February 1809, Lieutenant George James Evelyn was already captain of Swaggerer) Lieutenant Andrew Crawford was appointed to succeed Goodwin, who would die in late 1809 or early 1810 in the Royal Hospital, Plymouth. Crawford took command of Pickle in August 1809. While she was under his command, she was chiefly employed in the waters off Cádiz, Lisbon, and Guernsey.

On 15 April 1810 Pickle, under Crawford's command, captured the French brig Hypolite Chery and her cargo. A few weeks later, on 9 May, Pickle, Implacable, Imperieuse and Nonpareil were in company when Nonpareil captured the French navy brig Canoniere (or No. 176). (Note: The share of the prize money for an able seaman was 2s.) On 7 July 1810, Pickle sailed for the Davis Strait, the northern arm of the Labrador Sea.

Lieutenant Andrew Crawford relinquished command of Pickle in July 1811. She was subsequently commanded by Lieutenant William Figg. During the night of 17 December 1812 Pickle and the 18-gun ship-sloop Albacore were becalmed off the Lizard with six merchantmen. At dawn they found that they were also in company with the French 40-gun frigate Gloire. When a wind came up the Frenchman made all sail to escape, pursued by the British ships, who were joined later by the 12-gun brig-sloop Borer and 4-gun schooner Landrail. In the exchange of fire Albacore suffered one man killed and six or seven wounded before she pulled back. Eventually, the frigate managed to outrun the four small vessels. In the engagement Landrail did not actually fire her guns. As James put it, "for the Landrail to have fired her 12-pounders would have been a farce."

On 11 April 1813, Pickle captured the French sloop Marie Joseph, Laurent Le Breton, master. Pickle was in company when the cutter Surly captured the French sloop Les Amis on 18 March 1814. (Note: A first-class share of the prize money was worth £39 15s 1d; a sixth-class share was worth £2 6s 6¾d.)

== Fate ==
In 1816 Pickle was out of commission. She was sold on 11 June 1818.
