= Falmouth (ship) =

Several ships have been named Falmouth, possibly for Falmouth, Cornwall:

- Falmouth, a Massachusetts brig active in 1782
- Falmouth (1796 ship) was built in America and entered Lloyd's Register in 1796. She became a Liverpool-based slave ship that a privateer captured during Falmouth's first slave voyage.
- Falmouth (1806 ship) was launched at Liverpool as a slave ship. After the British slave trade ended in 1807, she became a West Indiaman until a privateer captured her in 1812.

== See also ==
- HMS Falmouth - one of nine actual or planned vessels of the British Royal Navy
- USS Falmouth - an 1827 sloop-of-war
