= Ocean (1790 ship) =

British merchant sloop (1790–1798)

History

Great Britain
- Name: Ocean
- Launched: 1790, Plymouth
- Captured: 1797
- Fate: Recaptured 1798

General characteristics
- Tons burthen: 41 (bm)
- Sail plan: Sloop

Ocean was a sloop launched in 1790 at Plymouth. Circa 1792 the Sierra Leone Company purchased her and sailed her in support of their colony. In 1793, the Company sent her on a voyage along the coast to trade for African commodities that she brought back to Freetown for re-export. The Company judged the experiment a success and the next year it sent several more vessels to do the same. The French captured Ocean in August 1796; the Royal Navy recaptured her in January 1798. As of May 2024, her subsequent fate is obscure.

== Career ==
Ocean first appeared in Lloyd's Register (LR) in 1791.

Year	Master	Owner	Trade	Source
1791	F.Garvey	Captain & Co.	Dublin–Waterford	LR
1792	F.Garvey; Abraham Low	Captain & Co. Sierra Leone Company	Lisbon–Plymouth; Cork–Africa	LR

In October 1793, the Sierra Leone Company sent Ocean to cruise from Bissau to Cape Mesurado. Her mission was to visit the forts on the way to purchase African commodities and bring them back to Freetown. There the company would warehouse them until it could export them on vessels visiting Freetown.

The trial apparently was a success. In April 1794 the company expanded the program.

- Domingo sailed to the River Gabon to acquire wax, ivory, and redwood
- Thornton sailed to the Gold Coast to trade in gold and ivory
- James and William carried rum and rice to the Gold Coast
- Amy sailed to São Tomé to gather "useful plants and seeds"
- Duke of Clarence was stationed at Rio Pongas as a factory
- The company also employed a small vessel as a packet to ferry goods and mail back to Freetown

Year	Master	Owner	Trade	Source
1795	A. Lock	Sierra Leone Company	London–Africa	LR
1796	S.Rowe	Sierra Leone Company	London–Sierra Leone	LR

In August 1796, the French privateers Africane and Carmagnole captured Ocean, Macaulay, master, off the coast of Africa. (Note: As of January 2023 it is not clear which vessels Aricane/Africaine and Carmagnole were. The most complete source on French privateers has no suitable candidates. One source reports that a French privateer named Carmagnole brought prizes captured from the British and the Spanish into Charleston between late 1794 and February 1796. Carmagnole disappeared from the Charleston records and was believed to have become one of Victor Hugues' privateers at Guadeloupe. She was described as a schooner of eight guns.) The report stated that they had also captured Speedwell, Payne, master, Manchester, Kendall, master, and Atlantic, Rae, master. (Note: Manchester and Speedwell were slave ships on their way to acquire enslaved people for the triangular trade. Atlantic and Ocean were not.)

Macaulay was the brother of the governor of the Sierra Leone settlement, Zachary Macaulay. The news of the capture of the vessels, including Ocean, reached the governor at Freetown on 3 September. A few days later Macaulay's brother arrived at Freetown, together with the letters he had been carrying when taken, and a letter from the captain of Africain. An American trader in enslaved people named McLeod, purchased Ocean at Gorée.

In late 1797 or early 1798 HMS Daedalus and HMS Hornet captured six French vessels off Gorée: Two of these were

- Ship Quaker, which was trading on the coast and had a cargo of merchandise and 337 captives.
- Sloop Ocean, which had belonged to the Sierra Leone Company. She was carrying cloth, iron, beads, and ten captives. (Note: It was common for vessels to shuttle captives between ports to get a better price for the trans-Atlantic trade.)

Daedalus and Hornet, were working with the letter of marque slave ships Ellis and St Anne to find and defeat "Renaud's Squadron". They shared by agreement in the proceeds of the recapture of Quaker (December 1797) and Ocean (January 1798).

The disposition of Ocean after her recapture is obscure. Ocean was no longer listed in Lloyd's Register in 1798.
