= Minerva (1795 ship) =

History

Great Britain
- Name: Minerva
- Builder: Lancaster, Lancashire
- Launched: 1795
- Fate: Last listed 1816

General characteristics
- Tons burthen: 185, or 186 (bm)
- Complement: 1799:18; 1801:25; 1803:30
- Armament: 1799:16 × 6&12-pounder guns; 1801:16 × 6&12-pounder guns; 1803:16 × 6&12-pounder guns; 1809:12 × 6-pounder guns + 4 × 18-pounder carronades

Minerva was launched in 1795 at Lancaster as a West Indiaman. In 1801 she was captured but immediately recaptured. Between 1802 and 1808 she made five voyages as a slave ship in the triangular trade in enslaved people. She was last listed in 1816.

== Career ==
Minerva entered Lloyd's Register (LR) in 1795 with W. Noble, master, Danson & Co., owners, and trade Cork-Martinique. In 1796 she had damages repaired.

Captain William Lynass acquired a letter of marque on 23 August 1799.

On 13 May 1801, Minerva, Lynass, master, was taken off the Spanish Coast as she was sailing from Tortola to Liverpool. However, the privateer Dart, of Dover, recaptured Minerva and brought her into Dover.

James Crow replaced Lynass as master and acquired a letter of marque on 8 July 1801. Lloyd's List for 1802 showed Minerva, with W. Lynass, master, changing to J. Crow, Danson & Co., owners, changing to Peckop & Co., and trade Liverpool–Tortola.

Minerva's new owners registered her at Liverpool in 1802, and then employed her as a slaver.

1st voyage transporting enslaved people (1802–1803): Captain George Cannon sailed from Liverpool on 29 September 1802. In 1802, 155 vessels sailed from England, bound for Africa to engage in transporting enslaved people; 122 of these vessels sailed from Liverpool.

Minerva acquired captives at Bonny, and arrived at the Bahamas on 19 April 1803. There she landed 212 captives. She arrived back at Liverpool on 15 August. She had left with 24 crew men and she suffered one crew death on the voyage.

2nd voyage transporting enslaved people (1803–1804): Captain William Brown acquired a letter of marque on 7 October 1803. He sailed from Liverpool on 20 November 1803. In 1803, 99 vessels sailed from England, bound for Africa to engage in transporting enslaved people; 83 of these vessels sailed from Liverpool.

Minerva acquired captives in West Africa and arrived at Kingston, Jamaica on 4 April 1804. There she landed 215 captives. She left on 17 June and arrived back at Liverpool on 11 August. She had left Liverpool with 35 crew members and she suffered 13 crew deaths on the voyage.

3rd voyage transporting enslaved people (1804–1805): Captain Brown sailed from Liverpool on 4 December 1804. In 1804, 147 vessels sailed from England, bound for Africa to engage in transporting enslaved people; 126 of these vessels sailed from Liverpool.

Minerva acquired captives slaves on the Windward Coast, i.e., between Nunez and Assini. She arrived at Demerara on 30 March 1805, where she landed 215 captives. She arrived back at Liverpool on 14 October 1805. She had left with 33 crew members and she suffered 10 crew deaths on the voyage.

4th voyage transporting enslaved people (1806–1807): Captain William Stowell sailed from Liverpool on 24 March 1806.

Minerva acquired captives at Rio Pongo and the sierra Leone estuary. She arrived at Demerara on 10 October and there landed 198 captives. She left on 21 January 1807 and arrived back at Liverpool on 8 April. She had left with 29 crew members and suffered nine crew deaths on the voyage.

5th voyage transporting enslaved people (1807–1808): Captain James Scarisbrick sailed from Liverpool on 3 May 1807.

Minerva acquired captives at the Sierra Leone estuary, Cape Mesurado, and Cape Mount. She arrived at Barbados on 8 February 1808, where she landed 122 captives. Captain James Hannah then sailed her to Berbice with 179 captives, the remainder of her cargo. Minerva arrived back at Liverpool on 3 September. She had left with 27 crew members and she lost seven on the voyage.

Some 100 of the captives Minerva carried may have been survivors from the explosion that sank Ann in the Sierra Leone estuary in mid-December 1807.

The Slave Trade Act 1807 banned the slave trade within the British Empire. Because Minerva's clearance from Liverpool was dated before the deadline of 1 May 1807, her voyage was still legal. (The last legal voyage was that of Kitty's Amelia, which left on 27 July.)

Her owners sold Minerva; James Hannah remained her master. The Register of Shipping (RS) for 1809 showed her with Hannah, master, Ackers & Co., owners, and trade Liverpool–Spain.

== Fate ==
Minerva was last listed in 1816, still with Hannah, master, and Akers, owner. Her trade was Liverpool–St Thomas.
