= Ellis (ship) =

Several vessels have been named Ellis:

- HMS Esperance (1795) was launched in America in 1781, and is first listed in Lloyd's Register in 1784 under the name Clementina. She then served as a slave ship, sailing out of Liverpool on two slave trading voyages. In 1786 Brent and Co. purchased her, renamed her Ellis, and sailed her for three more voyages as a slaver. In 1793 she became the privateer Ellis. The French captured her, then the Spanish, and then the French recaptured her. After returning to French ownership, she became the French corvette Esperance. The Royal Navy captured her in 1795 and took her into service as HMS Esperance. The Navy sold her in 1798.
- Ellis (1797 ship) was a French prize, captured in 1797, and possibly also built that year. Liverpool merchants purchased her. She made five complete voyages as a slave ship, carrying slaves from West Africa to the British West Indies. She was lost at sea on 23 April 1806 on her sixth voyage before she could take on any slaves.
