= HMS Swaggerer =

Brig of the Royal Navy

History

France
- Name: Bonaparte, or Napoleon
- Builder: American
- Captured: 1809, or 1808

United Kingdom
- Name: HMS Swaggerer
- Acquired: by capture, 1808 or 1809
- Fate: Broken up, 1815

General characteristics
- Type: Brig
- Tons burthen: c.300 (bm)
- Complement: 60
- Armament: 8 × 18-pounder carronades; 2 × 6-pounder guns

HMS Swaggerer was the French privateer Bonaparte (or Napoleon), captured in 1809 (or 1808). She served the Royal Navy in the Leeward Islands until broken up in 1815.

== Career ==
The circumstances of Bonaparte's capture are obscure and there are no details as to her dimensions.

The British renamed her Swaggerer and armed her with eight 18-pounder carronades and two 6-pounder guns. Lieutenant George James Evelyn, late of Eclair commissioned her on 8 February 1809.

On 17 April 1809, Pompee captured D'Hautpoul. Swaggerer was among the vessels entitled to share in the prize money. (Note: A first-class share was worth £44 1s 7½d and a second-class share, such as a lieutenant would receive, was worth £3 3s 8d; a sixth-class share, the return to an ordinary seaman, was worth 6s 6d.) Thereafter, Swaggerer assisted at the capture of Martinique, The Saintes, and Guadeloupe.

In August 1812 Swaggerer was in company with Surinam when they captured four American vessels: (Note: A first-class share for the first three vessels was worth £194 13s 3d and a second-class share was worth £36 9s 11¾d; a sixth-class share was worth £2 11s 6¼d.)

- General Hamilton (11 August), lying at Parimarabo, Surinam, carrying a cargo of molasses;
- Mary (11 August), lying at Parimarabo, Surinam, in ballast;
- Pochohantes (12 August), lying at Braam's Point, Surinam, and carrying a cargo of salt; and
- Mercator (24 August), bound to Baltimore, laden with molasses.

Evelyn was invalided out of Swaggerer in October 1812. His replacement, Lieutenant Martin Guise, took command of Swaggerer in 1813. In May Lloyd's List reported that Swaggerer had recaptured Jane, which had been sailing from Demerrary to Saint John, New Brunswick, when the Baltimore privateer Comet had captured her. Between 22 May and 9 June, Swaggerer sent into St Thomas three vessels:

Donna Francisca, Ferrara, master, which had been sailing from Guadeloup to Boston; and
Betsey, Hall, master, from Portland: and,
Peggy, Little, master, from Bath.

Then in 1814 Lieutenant Charles Deyman Jeremy (or Jermy) replaced Guise. Swaggerer was in company with Eclipse when, on 13 March 1814, they captured the brigantine Admiral Martin, which they sent in to Antigua. Then on 28 March Swaggerer and Ister captured Camilla, which they sent into Tortola. By December, Swaggerer was under the command of Lieutenant Alexander Sandilands.

== Fate ==
Swaggerer was broken up in 1815.
