= HMS Surinam (1805) =

Brig-sloop of the Royal Navy

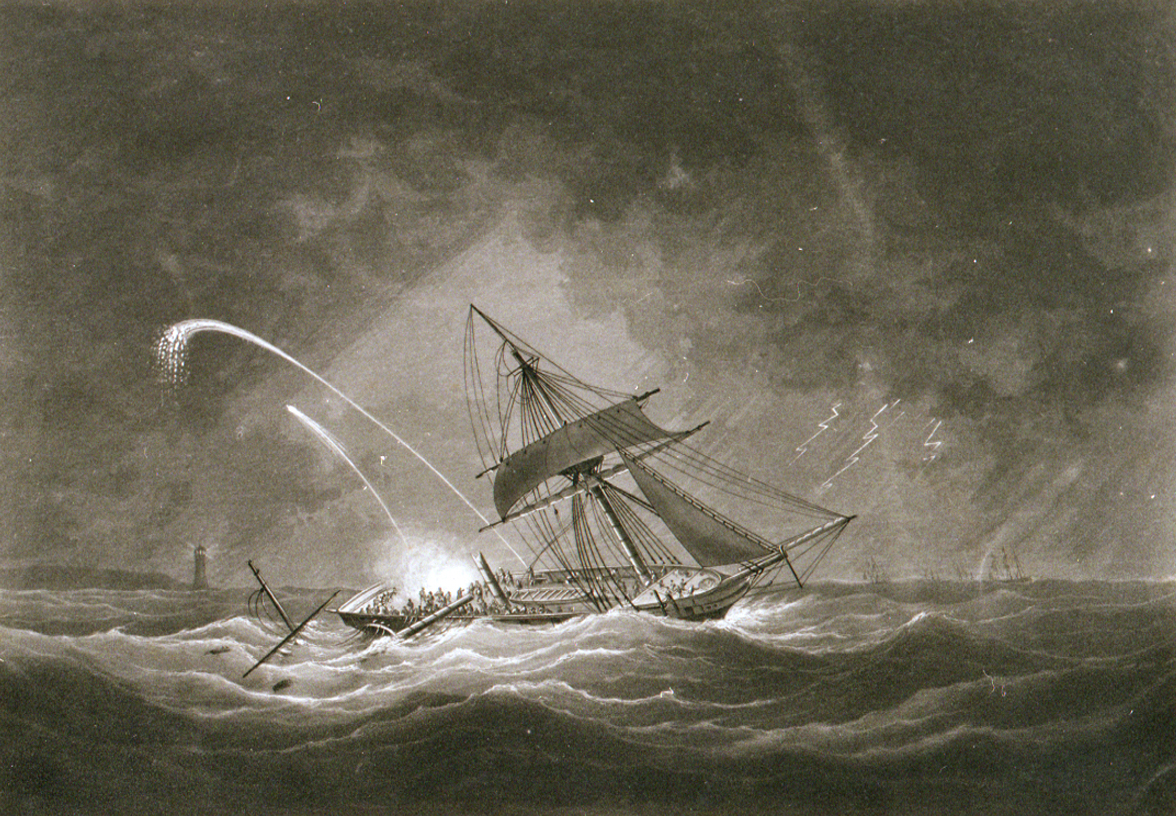
- HMS Surinam struck by lightning, 11 December 1806, by Nicholas Matthews Condy, National Maritime Museum, Greenwich

History

United Kingdom
- Name: HMS Surinam
- Ordered: 7 November 1803
- Builder: Ayles of Topsham
- Laid down: Feb 1804
- Launched: January 1805
- Honours and awards: Naval General Service Medal with clasps: "Martinique"; "Guadaloupe"
- Fate: Sold for breaking on 20 July 1825

General characteristics
- Type: Cruizer-class brig-sloop
- Tons burthen: 384 (bm)
- Length: Overall: 100 ft 0 in (30.5 m); Keel: 77 ft 4 1/2 in (23.6 m)
- Beam: 30 ft 6 1/2 in (9.3 m)
- Depth of hold: 12 ft 9 in (3.9 m)
- Sail plan: Brig rigged
- Complement: 121
- Armament: 16 × 32-pounder carronades + 2 × 6-pounder bow chasers

HMS Surinam was a Cruizer-class brig-sloop built by Obadiah Ayles at Topsham, Exeter and launched in 1805. She captured one privateer during her twenty-year career and took part in two campaigns before she was broken up in 1825.

== Napoleonic Wars ==
In March 1805 Commander Alexander Shippard commissioned Surinam for the Channel and then the Mediterranean. In September Surinam captured Merchant, master, which was sailing from New York, and sent her into Portsmouth.

Shippard was promoted to post-captain on 22 January 1806. However, he was still aboard Surinam when she captured Juliana on 28 February. A few days earlier Surinam had captured Venus, Robhen, master, which had been sailing from St Bartholomews, and sent her into Plymouth.

Surinam's next captain was briefly Commander H. Higman, and he was soon replaced by Commander John Lake in February 1806.

On 11 May 1806. Surinam captured three vessels: Pacifico, Tomasa and Alexandro. Then six days later she captured San Domingo. San Domingo was a schooner from Bilbao. Surinam also captured two luggers from Bilbao that may or may not be among the three vessels that she capture in May. Next, Surinam captured Anne Marie, Claasson, master, from St Thomas, and the Spanish lugger Alexander, and sent them into Plymouth. Lastly, Surinam detained the Danish vessel Constantia, Hankow, master, which had been sailing from St Croix to Copenhagen, and sent her into Plymouth too.

On 28 July Surinam was present or in sight at the capture of the French frigate Rhin.

On 11 December, while Surinam west of Belle Île watching for the French fleet under Admiral Willaumez, lightning struck her. The strike killed two men, wounded four, destroyed a mast and damaged her badly.

In 1807 Surinam was attached to Admiral Lord Gardner’s fleet off southern Ireland.

Surinam left the fleet for Plymouth on 15 November. On 17 November, some 17 leagues north of Ushant, she fell in with a French privateer. After a ten-hour chase Surinam captured the French vessel, which turned out to be Amiral Dacrés (or Amiral Decrés). The privateer was armed with fourteen 6-pounder guns and carried a crew of 76 men under the command of Jean G. Michel. She had sailed from St Malo the day before on her first cruise and had made no captures. At the time of the capture, HMS Pomone was in sight.

On 22 October, Surinam captured Jane and Eleanor.

On 30 January 1808, Surinam captured the French sloop Sta. Anna or Sta. Joseph Marie. A few days earlier, Surinam had detained Grace, Brown, master, which had been sailing from New York.

On 20 July Surinam was in company with Shannon and Eclair when Shannon captured Comet.

Then on 21 August, Surinam was in company with Shannon and Martial when Shannon captured Espoir.

On 9 November Surinam captured the sloop Jeune Henry. This may have been the John & Harry, from Guadeloupe that Lloyd's List reported arriving at Plymouth on 15 November.

The next month, on 15 December, Surinam sailed for the Leeward Islands. She arrived there on 26 January 1809 after having left the vessels she was convoying to Berbice, Demerara, and Surinam. She had left the rest of the convoy, which was going to other destinations, on 5 January.

Surinam was at the capture of Martinique in February 1809. In 1847 the Admiralty authorized the issuance of the Naval General Service Medal with clasp "Martinique" to all naval survivors of that campaign.

On 17 February 1810 Suriname, Frolic, and Superieure joined Captain William Charles Fahie of Abercrombie and his force at the surrender of Saint Martin. Fahie then entrusted Surinam with the despatches to Vice-Admiral The Honorable Alexander Cochrane.

By virtue of this action, Surinam effectively also participated in the capture of Guadeloupe in January and February 1810. (Note: A first-class share of the prize money for Guadaloupe was worth £113 3s 1¼d; a sixth-class share, that of an ordinary seaman, was worth £1 9s 1¼d.) In 1847 the Admiralty awarded the Naval General Service Medal with clasp "Guadaloupe" to all surviving participants of the campaign.

In 1810, Commander A. Hodge (or Hedge) took command, and the next year she visited her namesake country of Suriname, in South America. His replacement, in 1811, was A. Kennedy. In 1812, Commander John Ellis Watt took command on the Leeward Islands station and sailed her for the coast of Guyana.

In August 1812 Surinam was in company with Swaggerer when they captured four American vessels:

- General Hamilton (11 August), lying at Paramaribo, Suriname, carrying a cargo of molasses;
- Mary (11 August), lying at Paramaribo, Suriname, in ballast;
- Pochohantes (12 August), lying at Braams Point, Suriname, and carrying a cargo of salt; and
- Mercator (24 August), bound to Baltimore, laden with molasses.

Watt died in September 1813 on his passage home after eight years in the West Indies.

On 6 September 1812, Surinam was near Surinam when she encountered the American privateer Montgomery, which was under the command of Captain Upton. Montgomery was armed with two long 12-pounder guns and ten 6-pounders. Surinam gave chase until a shot from Montgomery struck and so weakened Surinam's foremast that she gave up the pursuit.

Surinam encountered the American privateer Governor Tompkins, of ten 9-pounder guns and 90 men, on 20 May 1813 off the coast of Surinam. After an engagement of some 45 minutes, Governor Tompkins was able to escape. In early April, Governor Tompkins had captured the Falmouth packet Mary Ann off Cape St Vincent as Mary Ann was sailing back to Falmouth from Malta. Then on 8 May, Governor Tompkins had captured Hartley, Grayson, master, which was sailing from Gibraltar to Bahia. The privateer burnt Hartley, and on 24 May deposited Captain Grayson and his crew at Grenada. Governor Tompkins then sailed for America, having been cruising for some three months.

On 16 September Surinam and HMS Grampus arrived off Portsmouth with 37 vessels that they had escorted from the Leeward Islands.

In 1814 Surinam returned to Britain. From October 1815 she was in ordinary at Sheerness.

== Post-war ==
Between 1817 and 1820 Surinam was at Chatham. On 18 November 1820 Commander William Mackenzie Godfrey took command and sailed for the West Indies. He was promoted to post-captain on 19 July 1822 and Commander Alfred Matthews replaced him. Commander Charles Crole succeeded him from April 1823. By 1825 Surinam was back at Chatham.

== Fate ==
On 22 June 1825 the "Principal Commissonars and Officers of His Majesty's Navy" offered her for sale. She was sold on 20 July 1825 at Chatham for £1,450 to John Small Sedger for breaking up.
