= Mary Ann (1807 ship) =

History

United Kingdom
- Name: Mary Ann
- Launched: 1807, Liverpool
- Captured: April 1813

General characteristics
- Tons burthen: 160, or 170, or 172, or 180 (bm)
- Complement: 25
- Armament: 1807: 14 × 9-pounder guns; 1809: 14 × 9-pounder guns; 1813: 10 × 6-pounder guns

Mary Ann was launched in 1807 at Liverpool. She made one voyage as a slave ship in the triangular trade in enslaved people. She then became a West Indiaman. From 1811 she became a Falmouth packet. In 1813 a United States privateer captured her.

== Career ==
Mary Ann first appeared in Lloyd's Register (LR) in 1807.

Year	Master	Owner	Trade	Source
1807	Answorth	Fisher & Co.	Liverpool–Africa	LR

Captain John Ainsworth acquired a letter of marque on 5 May 1807. He sailed from Liverpool on 29 May 1807. Mary Ann acquired captives at the Congo River.

As Mary Ann was on her way to the West Indies she encountered the sloop HMS Rattler. Rattler detained Mary Ann and sent her into Barbados, where she was later released. Mary Ann had sailed after 1 May, the day that the Slave Trade Act 1807, which banned British vessels from engaging in the slave trade, took effect. However, evidently she had cleared outbound prior to 1 May and so her voyage was among the last legal British enslaving voyages.

Mary Ann arrived at Barbados on 13 February 1808 with 207 captives. She landed 32 there and sailed on to Demerara. She arrived back at Liverpool on 21 June 1808.

Lloyd's Register continued to carry Mary Ann until 1814, but with data unchanged since 1807. However, although the Register of Shipping (RS) is not available in online form between 1807 and 1808, she did appear in the volume for 1809 as a West Indiaman.

Year	Master	Owner	Trade	Source
1809	Magreth (or M'Grath)	Campbell & Co.	London–Hayti	RS
1810	Birkett (or Birket)	Campbell & Co.	London–Hayti	RS
1812	Caddy	Geddies	London–Hayti	RS
1814	Caddy	Geddies	Falmouth packet	RS

In 1811 Mary Ann became a Post Office packet, sailing out of Falmouth. She was commissioned in August 1811. Her master was James Caddy (half-pay, RN).

Year	Master	Owner	Trade	Source
1813	Caddy	Angove & Co.	Falmouth packet	LR

== Fate ==
The United States privateer General Tonkin captured Mary Ann in early April 1813 as Mary Ann was 50 leagues west of Cape St Vincent while on her way from Malta to Gibraltar (and Falmouth). Governor Tompkins had a crew of 99 men and was armed with ten 9-pounder guns and one long 24-pounder on a traverse. By the time Captain Caddy struck, Mary Ann had been reduced to a mere wreck. Mary Ann arrived at Boston on 21 May. Mary Ann had one man killed and several wounded; General Tompkins had no casualties. Mary Ann was carrying $60,000 in gold and bullion. She had thrown her mails overboard before she was captured, but they were inadequately weighted, with the result that Governor Tompkins was able to retrieve them.

In his written explanation for the failure of the mails to sink, Caddy gave the date of the encounter as 8 April 1813. The action had taken one-and-a-half hours, half of the time at a range of under 300–400 yards. Caddy had been issued two "Piggs" of iron when he had commissioned Mary Ann, and he had used one per portmanteau of mail. He was mortified to discover that the bags did not sink. The Committee of Captains examining his conduct and the action exonerated Caddy. The Committee believed that the reason the mails had not sunk was that it had contained a number of boxes, which had increase the portmanteaus' buoyancy. The Postal Service appointed him to command of Swiftsure on 17 July 1813.

On 20 May 1813 Governor Tompkins encountered HMS Surinam off the coast of Surinam. After an engagement lasting three-quarters of an hour Governor Tompkins was able to escape. She made her way back to the United States. Governor Tompkins may have been captured on her next cruise.
