= Ellis (1797 ship) =

History

United Kingdom
- Name: Ellis
- Acquired: 1797 by purchase of a prize
- Fate: Lost at sea 23 April 1806

General characteristics
- Tons burthen: 303, or 305, or 308, or 312 (bm)
- Complement: 1797: 30; 1806: 30
- Armament: 1797: 18 × 6-pounder guns, or 16 × 6&9&12-pounder cannons; 1806:18 × 12&9&6-pounder cannons

Ellis was a French prize, captured in 1797, and possibly built in that year also. Liverpool merchants purchased her. She made five complete voyages as a slave ship in the triangular trade carrying enslaved people from West Africa to the British West Indies. She was lost at sea on 23 April 1806, on her sixth voyage before she could take on any captives.

== Career ==
Ellis first appeared in Lloyd's Register (LR) in 1797.

Year	Master	Owner	Trade	Source
1797	Souther	Hodgson	Liverpool–Africa	LR

1st voyage transporting enslaved people (1797–1798): Captain James Soutar acquired a letter of marque on 18 September 1797. He sailed from Liverpool on 26 October. In 1797, 104 vessels sailed from English ports, bound for the trade in enslaved people; 90 of these vessels sailed from Liverpool.

Ellis shared by agreement with HMS Daedalus, HMS Hornet, and Saint Ann in the proceeds of the recapture between December 1797 and January 1798 of Ocean and Quaker. The four vessels had been cruising jointly to find and destroy "Renaud's Squadron". (Note: Renaud was probably Jean-Marie Renaud.) Daedalus and Hornet destroyed Bell, which Renaud's squadron had captured, and did some damage to the town and fort at Gorée.

Ellis acquired captives first at Îles de Los and then at Cape Mount.

On 30 May 1798 Ellis, St Anne, and Pilgrim engaged the French frigate Convention, Captain Roscow, of 32 guns and 200 men. After an exchange of broadsides, the French sailed away. (Note: There was no French naval frigate named Convention at the time. She may have been a privateer, but the primary source on privateers also does not carry a Convention.)

Saint Ann and Ellis arrived at Barbados around 3 July. On their way they recaptured Hannah, which had been sailing from Mogadore to London when captured. (Note: Hannah, Lamb, master, had been captured in 1797 by the privateer Buonaparte, which sent her to Bayonne. Hannah, Lamb, master, of 87 tons (bm), had been launched at Sunderland in 1782. Buonaparte may have been a 32-tonne cutter from Saint-Malo. She was armed with three guns and had a crew of 32 men under a Captain F. Rousse. HMS Ambuscade captured her in the Caribbean around June 1797.)

Ellis arrived at Demerera on 17 July 1798 with 406 captives. She sailed from Demerara on 29 August and arrived back at Liverpool on 15 October. She had sailed from Liverpool with 68 crew members and she suffered four crew deaths on her voyage.

2nd voyage transporting enslaved people (1799): Captain Soutar sailed from Liverpool on 2 January 1799. In 1799, 156 vessels sailed from English ports, bound for the trade in enslaved people; 134 of these vessels sailed from Liverpool.

Ellis gathered captives at Bassa and then Cape Mount. She arrived at Demerara on 18 May with 431 captives. She left Demerara on 1 July and arrived back at Liverpool on 21 August. She had left Liverpool with 44 crew members and had suffered no crew deaths on the voyage.

3rd voyage transporting enslaved people (1800―1801): Captain Souter sailed from Liverpool in November 1799, bound for Africa, but quickly stranded in Bootle Bay. Soutar and Ellis finally sailed on 15 February 1800. In 1800, 133 vessels sailed from English ports, bound for the trade in enslaved people; 120 of these vessels sailed from Liverpool.

Ellis acquired captives in the Sierra Leone estuary and arrived at Suriname on 1 January 1801 with 220 captives. She arrived back at Liverpool on 16 April. She had left with 44 crew members and had suffered nine crew deaths on the voyage.

In 1801 Ellis was raised. When she got a second letter of marque in 1806 it gave her burthen as 308 tons, or 312 tons, a size reflected in the Trans-Atlantic Slave Trade database, though not in Lloyd's Register.

4th voyage transporting enslaved people (1801–1803): Captain Soutar sailed from Liverpool on 9 August 1801. In 1801, 147 vessels sailed from English ports, bound for the trade in enslaved people; 122 of these vessels sailed from Liverpool.

Ellis acquired captives at Bance Island and arrived at Suriname 10 April 1802, with 263 captives. She may also have delivered some captives to the Bahamas. From there she reportedly sailed t Antigua and Havana. She sailed for Liverpool on 17 April 1803 and arrived back there on 27 May, from Havana. She had left Liverpool with 38 crew members and she had suffered 14 crew deaths on her voyage.

5th voyage transporting enslaved people (1804–1805): Captain John Roach sailed from Liverpool on 1 September 1804. In 1804, 147 vessels sailed from English ports, bound for the trade in enslaved people; 126 of these vessels sailed from Liverpool.

Ellis acquired captives in West Africa and arrived at Suriname on 22 February 1805 with 303 captives. She sailed from Demerara on 19 June and arrived back at Liverpool on 23 July. She had left with 32 crew members and she had suffered seven crew deaths on her voyage.

== Fate ==
Ellis was sold to new owners c.1805. Captain William Browne acquired a letter of marque on 6 March 1806. Captain Brown sailed from Liverpool on 24 March. On 23 April Ellis was lost while going from Gorée to Rio Pongos.

In 1806, 33 British enslaving vessels were lost. Five were lost on the coast of Africa. During the period 1793 to 1807, war, rather than maritime hazards or resistance by the captives, was the greatest cause of vessel losses among British enslaving vessels.

Brown's next command was Ann, which caught fire and exploded in mid-December 1807 while acquiring captives in the Sierra Leone estuary.
