= HMS Garland (1798) =

History

Great Britain
- Name: Garland
- Acquired: 1798 by purchase
- Fate: Sold 1803

General characteristics
- Type: Schooner
- Propulsion: Sails
- Complement: 19
- Armament: 6 guns

HMS Garland was a schooner that the Royal Navy purchased in the West Indies in 1798 to act as a tender to Prince of Wales, the flagship of the Commander-in-Chief on the Leeward Islands station. (Note: There is no information extant as to any of Garland's dimensions, not even her burthen.) Garland captured a privateer of greater force than herself, as well as two small prizes. She was sold in March 1803, during the Peace of Amiens.

== Career ==
Garland's commander was Mr. Francis Banks, masters mate. In April 1796 Garland captured the French privateer Jeune Nantaize near Dominica. Garland was armed with six guns, and had a crew of 18. Jeune Nantaize was armed with four guns, and had a complement of 39 men. The 39 men included a detachment of 13 soldiers from the French garrison at Roseau, and ten volunteer seamen from merchant ships there, all sent by Dominica's governor. Capturing the privateer cost Garland one man killed and two wounded.

Banks received a commission as a lieutenant and in August an appointment to command Garland, an appointment he still held in 1799. (Note: The official date of his commission as a lieutenant was 24 November 1798. Banks went on to command Blazer on the Heligoland Station between 1809 and 1814. For his services there he received promotion to post captain on 13 October 1813, and was made a Knight of the Imperial Russian Order of Saint Anna, and the Royal Swedish Order of the Sword.)

On 9 April 1800, the tenders Pickle and Garland recaptured the schooner Hero. Hero had a crew of seven men and was 136 tons (bm). She was out of Guadeloupe, sailing from Pointe Petre to Saint Bartholomew with a load of cordwood. A week later, Pickle and Garland captured the Dutch schooner Maria. Maria had a crew of 19 men, armed with small arms, and was of 35 tons (bm) burthen. She was from Curaçao, sailing from Curaçao to Guadeloupe with a cargo of dry goods.

On 15 January 1801, while the 20-gun post-ship Daphne, 18-gun ship-sloops Cyane and Hornet, and schooner Garland (tender to Daphne), were at an anchor in the harbour of the Saintes, they observed a convoy of French coasters, escorted by an armed schooner, sailing towards Vieux-Fort, Guadeloupe. At midnight Garland, accompanied by two boats from each of the three ships, under the command of Lieutenants Kenneth Mackenzie of Daphne, and commander of Garland, and Francis Peachey, of Cyane, attempted to capture or destroy the convoy. The vessels, however, except one, succeeded in getting under the guns of Basse-terre. One vessel, which had anchored near Vieux-Fort, they boarded and brought off under a heavy but apparently harmless cannonade.

Two days later, in the afternoon, the British observed the French schooner Éclair, of four long 4-pounders, twenty 1½ pounder brass swivels, and 45 men, the escort of the convoy in question, put into Trois-Rivières, and anchor under the protection of one principal battery and two smaller flanking ones. Mackenzie and Peachey volunteered to attempt cutting her out. For this purpose Mackenzie, with 25 seamen and marines, went on board Garland. The next day, 18 January, which was as early as the breeze would permit, Garland ran alongside Éclair and Mackenzie and Peachey, with 30 men, boarded and carried the French schooner in the face of the batteries.

Garland had two men killed and three wounded. The French had one man killed and two drowned, and nine men wounded, including the lieutenant de vaissau commanding Eclair.

Although Éclair carried only four guns, she was pierced for 12 and was large enough to carry them. She was on her way to Pointe Petre to complete her armament of twelve 6-pounders and 20 brass swivels. The British took her into service HMS Eclair and armed her with twelve 12-pounder carronades. Mackenzie became Eclair's first British commander.

== Fate ==
The Navy sold Garland in March 1803.
