= Ann (1807 ship) =

Slave Ship Ann, Liverpool, (England)

History

United Kingdom
- Name: Ann
- Owner: William Ackers
- In service: 1807
- Fate: Blown up mid-December 1807

General characteristics
- Tons burthen: 197 (bm)

Ann was a slave ship that sailed from Liverpool in 1807 in the triangular trade in enslaved persons. As of December 2022, her origins are obscure. Ann, William Brown, master sailed from England on 4 May 1807. (Note: William Brown was a highly experienced captain of slave ships. Between 1792 and 1807, he made 13 voyages, involving nine vessels and four owners.)

She arrived at Sierra Leone from Liverpool and by September was at "Kiltann" (or "Kittanu"). In mid-December she was on the Windward Coast when she exploded with the loss of some 100 captives and some crew. Apparently she had caught fire. Some crew survived.

Minerva acquired about 100 surviving captives and took them to Barbados. (Note: Minerva was probably Minerva, which had acquired captives in the Sierra Leone estuary in 1807, and had arrived at Barbados on 8 February 1808. William Ackers and William Brown were part-owners of Minerva. Brown had been captain of Ellis, which had been lost in 1806, and was also an Ackers-owned enslaving ship.)

Ann does not appear in the most complete record of losses among enslaving ships, or captains of enslaving ships, though Brown does.
