= Saint Ann (1797 ship) =

British slave ship (1797–1798)

History

Great Britain
- Name: Saint Ann
- Owner: Robert Johnson
- Launched: 1797, Liverpool
- Fate: Lost 1798

General characteristics
- Tons burthen: 180, or 249 (bm)
- Complement: 30
- Armament: 16 × 9-pounder guns

Saint Ann (or Saint Anne, or Saint Anna) was launched at Liverpool in 1797. She made one voyage as a slave ship in the triangular trade in enslaved people. She foundered or was shipwrecked or destroyed in 1798 after she had delivered her captives but before she could return to Liverpool.

== Enslaving voyage and loss ==
St Ann first appeared in Lloyd's Register (LR) in 1797.

Year	Master	Owner	Trade	Source
1797	R.Jones	R.Johnson	Liverpool–Africa	LR

Captain Robert Jones acquired a letter of marque on 18 September 1797. He sailed from Liverpool on 26 October 1797. In 1797, 104 vessels sailed from English ports, bound for the trade in enslaved people. Of these vessels, 90 sailed from Liverpool.

Saint Ann was at Falmouth on 3 November. Captain Jones acquired captives first at Iles de Los, and then at Cape Grand Mount.

Saint Ann shared by agreement with HMS Daedalus and HMS Hornet, and the letter of marque slave ship Ellis in the proceeds of the recapture of Quaker (December 1797) and Ocean (January 1798). The four vessels had been cruising jointly to find and destroy "Renaud's Squadron". (Note: Renaud was probably Jean-Marie Renaud.) Daedalus and Hornet destroyed Bell, which Renaud's squadron had captured, and did some damage to the town and fort at Gorée.

On 30 May 1798 Ellis, St Anne, and Pilgrim engaged the French frigate Convention, Captain Roscow, of 32 guns and 200 men. After an exchange of broadsides, the French sailed away. (Note: There was no French naval frigate named Convention at the time. She may have been a privateer, but the primary source on privateers also does not carry a Convention.)

Saint Ann and Ellis arrived at Barbados around 3 July. On their way they recaptured Hannah, which had been sailing from Mogadore to London when captured. (Note: Hannah, Lamb, master, had been captured in 1797 by the privateer Buonaparte, which sent her to Bayonne. Hannah, Lamb, master, of 87 tons (bm), had been launched at Sunderland in 1782. Buonaparte may have been a 32-tonne cutter from Saint-Malo. She was armed with three guns and had a crew of 32 men under a Captain F. Rousse. HMS Ambuscade captured her in the Caribbean around June 1797.)

Saint Ann arrived at St Vincent on 7 July 1798 with 384 captives.

It is not clear when and how Saint Ann was lost. One source states that Captain Robert Jones was lost at sea on this, his seventh voyage as captain of a slave ship, and gives a date of 26 June 1798, but the report of her arrival at St Vincent makes no mention of "late Jones".

Saint Ann had left Liverpool with 70 crew members, and had lost 60 on her voyage.

In 1798, 25 British vessels engaged in transporting enslaved people were lost. Two were lost on their way back to England. In 1798, 160 vessels sailed from British ports on enslaving voyages, for a 16% loss rate. During the period 1793 to 1807, war, rather than maritime hazards or resistance by the captives, was the greatest cause of vessel losses among British enslaving vessels.
