= African Queen (1797 ship) =

History
- Launched: 1789, or 1790
- Fate: Taken in prize 1796

Great Britain
- Name: African Queen
- Owner: 1797:Thomas King; 1798:Charles Anderson (Note: African Queen may have been sold in November 1798. From then on Lloyd's Register gives her owner's name as Anderson, not King.)
- Acquired: 1797
- Fate: Lost December 1801

General characteristics
- Tons burthen: 268 (bm)
- Length: 78 ft (23.8 m)
- Beam: 29 ft (8.8 m)
- Depth of hold: 10 ft 2 in (3.1 m)
- Complement: 25 (1797)
- Armament: 6 × 6-pounder guns

African Queen's origins are uncertain. She was a foreign vessel, launched in 1789 or 1790, presumably under another name. She was taken in prize in 1796 and by 1797 she was sailing out of Bristol. She made one voyage to Africa during which she was captured and recaptured and then became a slave ship in the triangular trade in enslaved people. She made one voyage to the West Indies as a merchant ship, and one voyage as a whaler, but was damaged in 1801 as she returned home from that whaling voyage and apparently never sailed again.

== Career ==
African Queen first appeared in Lloyd's Register (LR) in 1797 with R. Buckle, master, T. King, owner, and trade Bristol–Africa. She had undergone small repairs in 1796.

Africa voyage: African Queen, Buckle, master, sailed from Bristol on 27 February 1797. In 1797, 104 vessels sailed from British ports, bound for the trade in enslaved people. Only two of these vessels sailed from Bristol.

African Queen, Buckle, master, was taken on the Windward Coast as she was sailing from Africa to Bristol, Quaker, of Liverpool, with 350 captives, and African Queen, of Bristol, Buckle, master, were retaken. (Note: By one account, the recaptor was Pilgrim, of 279 tons (bm), Edward Mentor, master. Pilgrim had a letter of marque and was armed with eighteen 9 and 6-pounder guns. Pilgrim, of Bristol, was on her fifth of six voyages transporting enslaved people. Another report gives African Queen's recaptors as Pilgrim and Sally.) African Queen had been on a direct voyage (for wood, ivory, and palm oil for Britain), not gathering captives for the West Indies.

Voyage transporting enslaved people (1798): Rather than returning to Bristol, African Queen commenced acquiring captives at Cape Coast Castle. She arrived at Demerara on 7 June 1798. She arrived with 313 captives and she landed 49 at Demerara. She then sailed to St Vincent, where she arrived on 26 June, and landed the remaining 264. She returned to Bristol on 18 September.

Merchant voyage: In March 1799 African Queen, Sands, master, was at Cork, having come from Bristol. On 9 March she sailed from Cork, bound for Barbados, as part of a large convoy for the West Indies under escort by HMS Volage. In May she was reported to have arrived at Barbados. By January 1800 African Queen, Cook, master, was back at Cork, having come from Lisbon.

Whaling voyage: Although some sources report that African Queen made a whaling voyage to the Brazil Banks under the command of R. Buckle, it is clear from the above information that she had transported enslaved people instead. However, in 1800 African Queen, Benjamin Cook, master, did go whaling to the Brazil Banks.

While outward bound African Queen lost two boats and five men in a storm near Trinidad. In April 1800 she stopped at Rio de Janeiro to get sailors, and wood to replace the lost boats.

In May 1801 it was reported that African Queen was wintering in South Georgia. On 19 September 1801 African Queen was at Saint Helena on her way back to Bristol from the South Seas.

== Fate ==
By one account, African Queen had returned to Bristol in November 1801. However, Lloyd's List reported on 8 December 1801 that African Queen, Cook, master, was on shore in the Bristol Channel and full of water. She had been returning to Bristol from the South Seas. African Queen was later refloated and taken in to Newport, Monmouthshire.

African Queen was valued at £6,500 in 1802, and was listed in Lloyd's Register until 1804 with B. Cook, master, Anderson, owner, and trade Bristol–Barbados. However, she did not appear in Lloyd's List's SAD data after December 1801.
