= Friendship (1797 ship) =

History

Great Britain
- Name: Friendship
- Builder: Spain or France
- Launched: 1780
- Acquired: 1797
- Fate: Last listed in 1810

General characteristics
- Tons burthen: 178, or 196, or 200 (bm)
- Complement: 1798: 25; 1800: 25
- Armament: 1798: 18 × 4&6-pounder guns; 1800: 18 × 6&12-pounder guns

Friendship was launched in France or Spain, possibly in 1780. The British captured her in 1797 and she became a West Indiaman, and from 1798 a slave ship in the triangular trade in enslaved people. Friendship made two complete voyages carrying captives from West Africa to the West Indies. On her third voyage crew members mutinied, taking her before she had embarked any captives. They sailed for a French port in the Caribbean but the Royal Navy retook her in 1801 and brought her into Barbados. There the Government Agent sold her. The incident resulted in a legal dispute between the owners and the insurers that in 1813 was decided in favour of the owners. New owners in 1803 continued to sail Friendship as West Indiaman. She was last listed in 1810.

== Career ==
Friendship first appeared in Lloyd's Register (LR) in 1798, as a West Indiaman.

Year	Master	Owner	Trade	Source
1798	A.Cowan; T.Mill; M.Booth	M'Dowall; C.___; C.Angus	London; London–Barbados	LR
1799	M.Booth	Angus & Co.	Liverpool–Africa	LR

1st voyage transporting enslaved people (1798–1799): Captain Miles Booth acquired a letter of marque on 5 June 1798. Friendship sailed from Liverpool on 5 July 1798, bound for West Africa. In 1798, 160 vessels sailed from English ports, bound for the trade in enslaved people; 149 of these vessels sailed from Liverpool.

Captain Booth died on 17 January 1799. She arrived at Martinique on 2 April 1799 with 263 captives. She arrived back at Liverpool on 29 June, under the command of John Dixon. She had left Liverpool with 37 crew members and she had suffered nine crew deaths on her voyage.

2nd voyage transporting enslaved people (1800–1801): Captain Adam Elliott acquired a letter of marque on 7 March 1800. Friendship sailed from Liverpool on 25 March. In 1800, 133 vessels sailed from English ports, bound for the trade in enslaved people; 120 of these vessels sailed from Liverpool.

Elliott acquired captives at Calabar, and arrived at Kingston, Jamaica on 22 December with 218 captives. She sailed from Jamaica on 18 February 1801, and arrived back at Liverpool on 11 May. She had left Liverpool with 34 crew members and she had suffered six crew deaths on her voyage.

Neither Lloyd's Register nor the Register of Shipping (RS) caught the change of master that occurred in 1801.

3rd voyage transporting enslaved people (1801): Captain William Beamish Lane had not acquired a letter of marque when he sailed from Liverpool on 6 August 1801. In 1801, 147 vessels sailed from English ports, bound for the trade in enslaved people; 122 of these vessels sailed from Liverpool.

Lloyd's List reported in February 1802 that "Friendship, Lane, from Liverpool to Africa, had been taken by Part of the Crew and carried into Barbados."

On 6 October, Friendship arrived at Majumba Bay. On 12 October Captain Lane took four crew members with him on shore. He instructed the seamen to await his return but they sailed back to the ship after he had left them. This was the signal for the mutiny. The mutineers shot the Second Mate, captured the other officers, and took control of the vessel. A short time after the mutiny broke out, the mutineers permitted the First Mate, Third Mate, and five sailors to go on shore in the whale-boat, together with a considerable quantity of the ship's stores and provisions; the mutineers forbade some sailors to leave as the mutineers expected that they would be needed to man the ship. The mutineers then set out for Cayenne, where they planned to sell Friendship.

When the whale-boat approached the shore, Captain Lane sailed in a canoe to meet it. Advised of what had happened, he decided to try to sail the whaleboat in search of Friendship. He and the seven men first sailed to "Saint Thomas" (probably São Tomé), to see if she had called in there. They then sailed on to Demerara and Barbados.

On Friendship the mutineers did not know how to navigate. The bosun did, and he agree to take on the task. Unbeknownst to the mutineers, he steered for Barbados. On 26 November, as Friendship approached Barbados, she fell in with HMS Hornet, which put the mutineers in irons and took Friendship into Carlisle Bay. There some of the ringleaders were tried and executed.

The Government Agent at Barbados took charge of Friendship. In Captain Lane's absence, and without waiting for instructions from London, the agent sold her entire cargo and stores. When Captain Lane and his seven men arrived at Barbados, Lane found that all that remained of Friendship was the hull and rigging.

After corresponding with the owners, the Agent sold Friendship on 22 April 1803. The new owners then sailed her to England. The former owners then claimed against the insurers for a total loss. This gave rise to sequence of cases and appeals in that although the purpose of the voyage had been frustrated, the vessel itself had reached port. On 2 June 1813, the Lord Chancellor re-instated the ruling of the Admiralty court of 3 November 1803 in favour of the insured: "the assured were entitled to abandon, that they did abandon in time, and that the abandonment was not waived." Therefore, for the purposes of insurance, Friendship was a total loss.

Year	Master	Owner	Trade	Source & notes
1802	W.Lane; J.Ross	Brown & Co. Goodwin	Liverpool–Africa; London–Barbados	RS; good repair 1801 & thorough repair 1802
1810	J. Ross	Goodwin	London–Barbados	RS; good repair 1801 & thorough repair 1802

== Fate ==
Friendship was last listed in the Register of Shipping in 1810. However, the term "Friendship, Ross" last appeared in Lloyd's List's ship arrival and departure data in January 1803. Because Friendship was a common name for vessels, absent original research, as of January 2023 it has proven impossible to discover her subsequent disposition.
