= Thomas King (merchant) =

Thomas King was a British merchant and privateer who acquired wealth through trade and privateering.

King was the grandson of John King, a merchant and a former mayor of Bristol. He began work as a trainee under a timber merchant but did not find the job interesting. When war broke out between France and England, King took interest in fighting. At the age of nineteen, he joined a crew of privateers on Lyon, a frigate owned by Sydenham Teast. But when it went sailing, the ship came under fire from French ships unlike what it had anticipated and the captain quickly pulled back to Teast's dock in Bristol for repairs. The next journey, the ship took hold of a French and two Spanish ships. Thereafter, King formed a relationship with Teast, and when Teast was looking for a crew to carry iron rods, rum, and clothes to skim the coast of West Africa in exchange for palm oil, King became involved in the proposed venture. In 1788, he was captain of the ship African Queen. After embarking on a few voyages to Africa, King bought African Queen and obtained a marquee to engage in profiteering against French interests when war was renewed between France and England. King expanded his interest in trade with Africa, after his marriage to Sarah Poole, the daughter of Samuel Poole, he engaged the services of Richard Buckle as captain of his shipping venture and reduced his sailing activities. His ships stocked goods from East India including, Calicoes, linen, cloth, gunpowder, beef, wine and sugar.

By 1797, Thomas interest shifted to other places, he formed a venture along with his wife's family and other syndicates trading under the names J. King and Son and King and Poole. He returned to trade in Africa towards the 1810s where he was a pioneer from Bristol in 'legitimate' trade to Africa.

King held interests in the ships: John Cabot (along with his sons), Neptune (built in 1811), African Queen, Colin, and London (built in 1788).
