= Armed schooner =

An armed schooner was a small warship of the Age of Sail, most often of schooner rig but the term is also used for other rigs, for example HMS Advice (1779) was cutter rigged.

== See also ==
- Category:Schooners of the Royal Navy
- Category:Schooners of the United States Navy
- List of schooners
- HMS Diana (1775)
