= Reimsdyke (1796 ship) =

Dutch merchantman and British merchantman and slave ship (1796–1803)

History

Great Britain
- Name: Reimsdyke
- Launched: 1796, Batavia
- Captured: 1797 & 1803
- Fate: Disappeared December 1803
- Notes: Teak-built

General characteristics
- Tons burthen: 281, or 290, or 295, or 299 (bm)
- Armament: 1799:4 × 6-pounder guns; 1800:6 × 6-pounder guns; 1801:2 × 6-pounder guns

Reimsdyke was launched at Batavia in 1796. She was taken as a prize in 1797 and became a British West Indiaman. In 1801 she became a slave ship in the triangular trade in enslaved people. She made one complete voyage. In 1803 the Royal Navy captured her on her second voyage as she was sailing under the colours of the Batavian Republic and she was condemned in prize. She drifted out to sea after her capture and disappeared with over 200 captives still aboard.

== Possible origin ==
During the Quasi-War between France and the United States, Reimsdyke, of Providence, Rhode Island, Ahorn, master, was returning from Île de France when a French privateer captured her and took her into St Martin's. A British lugger cut her out and took Reimsdyke into Tortola. (Note: In 1805 Van Reimsdyk was a merchant at Batavia doing business with various parties in Providence, Rhode Island.)

On 9 February 1798, Reymsdyke, M'Clenahan, master, arrived at Gravesend from Martinique.

== Career ==
Reimsdyke first appeared in Lloyd's Register (LR) as Reymsdyk, with origin India.

Year	Master	Owner	Trade	Source
1798	M'Clann; J.Hanna	Bourdieu	London–Martinique	LR
1799	J.Hanna; Owen	Bourdieu; T.Dudgeon	London–Martinique	LR
1800	R.Owen; R.Colston	Calvert & Co.	London-Demerara	LR

On 16 February 1800, Reimsdyke, Fry, master, came into Plymouth leaky. She was carrying a cargo from London to Demerara.

Year	Master	Owner	Trade	Source
1801	R.Colston	Camden	London-Demerara	LR
1802	R.Colston; M'Ivers	T.King	London–Africa	LR

1st voyage transporting enslaved people (1801–1802): Reimsdyke sailed from London on 17 November 1801, bound for Africa. In 1801, 147 vessels sailed from English ports, bound for the trade in enslaved people; 23 of these vessels sailed from London.

Lloyd's List's ship arrival and departure data and the Trans-Atlantic Slave Trade Voyage database report that her captain was Cooley, or Richard Coley, but the database also reports that Coley had left England on 4 August 1801 as captain of Minerva, not returning until 22 August 1802. Lloyd's List also reported that Reimsdyke, Cooley, master was at Portsmouth on 1 December, having returned from Africa. The actual master was James McIver.

Reimsdyke started acquiring captives on 25 January 1802, first at Cape Coast Castle, and then at Accra. She arrived at Demerara on 31 May, with 274 captives. She arrived back at London on 19 September, under the command of Captain Nox.

2nd voyage transporting enslaved people (1802–loss): Captain James McIver sailed from London on 21 December 1802. In 1802, 155 vessels sailed from English ports, bound for the trade in enslaved people; 30 of these vessels sailed from London.

She sailed to Rotterdam with a cargo of sugar from London. At Rotterdam she took on four more crew members and trade goods and sailed for West Africa. She sailed during the Peace of Amiens so trading with The Netherlands was not an issue. Furthermore, Reimsdyke's owner, Thomas King, also arranged for her nominal sale to two agents there. King had plantations in Demerara, which was a Dutch Colony and the authorities would not permit British ships to deliver enslaved people to the colony. King's nominal sale would permit Reimsdyke to sail under the Dutch flag and so deliver to his plantations the captives that he would acquire in West Africa.

Reimsdyke started acquiring captives on 24 February 1803 at Cape Coast Castle. Actually, she visited several ports on the coast. Ultimately, most of the captives she carried came from Minerva, another vessel that Henry King owned.

The Trans-Atlantic Slave Trade database reports that Reimsdyke's subsequent fate is unknown. However, more is known.

== Fate ==
On 30 August 1803 HMS Hornet, under the command of Commander Peter Hunt, captured a Dutch ship, whose name was not recorded, that was carrying 410 captives. Other records show that the vessel was Reimsdyke. Hornet took Reimsdyke to Kingstown, Saint Vincent, arriving there on 4 September. Adjudication of the prize did not begin until 28 October. Around the end of November, 60 or 70 captives suffering from rheumatism from their long confinement on the vessel were sent ashore to recuperate before their sale. Some captives had also died.

On 25 December Reimsdyke separated from her anchors and drifted out to sea. The schooner or sloop Hornet, Hamilton Woods, master, set out to find her. Woods succeeded in locating Reimsdyke and took off 115 captives, all that Hornet could carry. Reimsdyke's subsequent fate is unknown. It was believed at the time that a French privateer may have taken her.

Reimsdyke was condemned in prize, but William King claimant of the ship and 376 captives on behalf of Thomas King merchant of London, and for 24 captives marked 13 on the arm, on behalf of John Blenkarne, chief of Dick's Cove, West Africa, a British subject, appealed the decision. It is the documents from the appeal that provide most of the information about Reimsdyke's last voyage. The Court rejected the appeal, ruling that ship and captives were condemned as lawful prize to the Crown, i.e., HMS Hornet and Commander Hunt.
