= HMS Intelligent =

Brig of the Royal Navy

History

United Kingdom
- Name: HMS Intelligent
- Ordered: 20 November 1804
- Builder: Nicholas Bools and William Good, Bridport
- Laid down: January 1805
- Launched: 26 August 1805
- Renamed: Mooring lighter No.4
- Fate: In 1864 still in use; ultimate disposition unknown

General characteristics
- Class & type: Confounder-class gunbrigs
- Tons burthen: 1814/94 (bm)
- Length: Overall:84 ft 0 in (25.6 m); Keel:69 ft 9 1/2 in (21.3 m)
- Beam: 224 ft 1 in (68.3 m)
- Depth of hold: 11 ft 0 in (3.4 m)
- Complement: 50
- Armament: 10 × 18-pounder carronades + 2 × 12-pounder chase guns

HMS Intelligent was launched in 1805 at Bridport as a Confounder-class gunbrig. She was the only Royal Navy vessel to be named Intelligent. She had an uneventful career. The Admiralty tried to sell her in 1805, but the sale fell through and she became a mooring lighter that was still in service in 1864.

== Career ==
Lieutenant Nicholas Tucker commissioned Intelligent in October 1805.

On 22 August Intelligent was in sight, together with a number of other warships, when Procris captured Minerva.

Intelligent was among the vessels that shared in the prize money for the capture of Copenhagen in 1807. (Note: An able seaman's share of the prize money was worth £3 8s.)

On 6 March 1809 the schooner Mermede, a prize to Intelligent came into Falmouth. Intelligent had captured Arminde on 4 March.

On 5 October 1810 Intelligent boarded Quaker as Quaker was returning to London from Trinidad.

On 3 August 1812 Charles, Edg___, master came into Plymouth. She had been sailing in ballast from Portsmouth to America when Intelligent detained her. Intelligent had captured Charles, Elwell, master, on 1 August. (Note: A first class share of the prize money was worth £182 1s 10½d; a sixth-class share, that of an ordinary seaman, was worth £9 12s 9d.)

== Fate ==
The "Principal Officers and Commissioners of His Majesty's Navy" first offered the "Intelligent gunbrig, of 181 tons", lying at Portsmouth, for sale on 23 March 1815.

Intelligent was put into ordinary in July 1815. She was finally sold for £610 on 14 October.

The sale fell through when purchaser refused to accept Intelligent. She was fitted at Portsmouth between August and September 1816 as a mooring lighter. By 1864 she was mooring lighter No.4. Her ultimate fate is unknown.
