= HMS Advice (1779) =

Cutter of the Royal Navy

History

Great Britain
- Name: HMS Advice
- Acquired: 1779
- Fate: Wrecked on 1 June 1793

General characteristics
- Class & type: 10-gun cutter
- Tons burthen: 95 28/94 (bm)
- Length: 56 ft (17.1 m) (overall); 38 ft 2 in (11.6 m) (keel)
- Beam: 21 ft 8 in (6.6 m)
- Propulsion: Sails
- Complement: 45
- Armament: 10 × 3-pounder guns + 10 × ½-pounder swivel guns

HMS Advice was a 10-gun cutter that the Royal Navy purchased in 1779. She was wrecked in 1793.

== Career ==
Advice was fitted out at Deptford for the sum of £801 between 7 April and 19 May 1780. She was commissioned in May under Lieutenant John B. Swan (or Swann), who commanded her in the English Channel and then the North Sea. Later in the year Advice lost her boat, which she was towing because it was too big too hoist on deck.

Lieutenant Thomas Dyson took command in May 1781, and remained Advice's commander until she was paid off in September that year. In 1782 Lieutenant Edward Williams took command for the North Sea. He paid her off in 1782/83, but then recommissioned her in 1783 for the south and west Irish coasts. He paid her off again in December 1786.

In 1787 her commander was Lieutenant Edward Williams. A great repair was carried out at Portsmouth, after which she recommissioned in December 1789 under Lieutenant Henry Wray. Wray sailed her to Jamaica on 5 February 1790. At some point in 1792 she came under the command of Lieutenant (acting) William McGuire.

After two years service in Jamaican waters she was put up for sale on 22 November 1792. She was subsequently withdrawn from sale, registered as a schooner on 3 January 1793, but was sold on 6 March 1793.

== Fate ==
She made a brief return to service under Lieutenant Edward Tyrell. (Note: The National Maritime Museum lists this as a separate vessel built in 1792 and serving until 1793, though on the lists until 1799.) However, she was wrecked to leeward of Key Bokell (17.1789°N 87.901°W; southern tip of the Turneffe Atoll), Honduras on 1 June 1793. Her crew was saved. Tyrell and his crew were all acquitted of the loss at the subsequent court martial.
