= Quaker (1781 ship) =

History

Great Britain
- Builder: America
- Launched: 1774
- Captured: 1795

General characteristics
- Tons burthen: 170, or 171 (bm)
- Length: 70 ft 2 in (21.4 m)
- Beam: 22 ft 6 in (6.9 m)
- Complement: 1781: 50; 1782: 50; 1793: 15
- Armament: 1781: 16 × 6-pounder guns; 1782: 18 × 6-pounder guns; 1793: 6 × 3-pounder + 2 swivel guns

Quaker was built in America in 1774, possibly under another name, and was taken in prize in 1780. She appears in British records from 1781. Between 1781 and 1783 she sailed as a privateer and captured several ships, American, Spanish, and French. She then became a whaler, making four voyages to the British southern whale fishery. Thereafter she became a West Indiaman. The French captured her in 1795.

== Career ==
Quaker was captured in 1780 and condemned in the Vice admiralty court in New York on 11 October 1780.

Quaker first appeared in Lloyd's Register (LR) in 1781.

Year	Master	Owner	Trade	Source & notes
1781	T.Dwyer	T.Gilbert	Liverpool–Newfoundland	LR; lengthened 1777
1782	T.Dwyre; J.Evans	T.Gilbert	Liverpool–Newfoundland; Liverpool privateer	LR; lengthened 1777 & repaired 1782

Privateer: Thomas Dwyer acquired a letter of marque on 5 May 1781. In January 1782 Lloyd's List (LL) reported that Quaker, Dwyer, master, had taken a valuable Spanish prize and taken her into Antigua. Quaker returned to Liverpool from Tortola. This prize may have been one of three that Quaker had taken into Antigua in early 1782 and that together had been sold for £21,000. In late 1782 Quaker, Dwyer, master, arrived at Antigua from Newfoundland.

William Evans acquired a letter of marque on 2 July 1782. Quaker, Evans, master, was reported to have captured a rebel (American) privateer of 13 guns while on his way to Newfoundland from Liverpool.

In November 1782 Lloyd's List reported that as Quaker, Evans, master, was on her way to Newfoundland, she encountered a French frigate of 44 guns. The two vessels exchanged a broadside, and then Quaker outsailed the frigate, escaping to Newfoundland after a 12-hour chase. Quaker had one boy killed and another wounded. She received no other damage.

In February 1783 Lloyd's List reported that Quaker, Evans, master, of Liverpool had taken and sent into Tortola a French letter of marque brig that had been sailing from Martinique to France. The brig was carrying a cargo of coffee, sugar, and cocoa believed to be worth £10,000. Quaker, Evans, master, then returned to Liverpool from Puerto Rico.

Year	Master	Owner	Trade	Source & notes
1783	J.Evans; J.Meader	T.Gilbert	Liverpool privateer Liverpool–Southern fishery	LR; lengthened 1777, repaired 1782, & thorough repair 1783

1st whaling voyage (1783–1784): Quaker, J.Meader, master, sailed for the Southern Fishery in 1783. In August 1784 Quaker, Madder, master, returned to Leverpool from the Southern Fishery.

Year	Master	Owner	Trade	Source & notes
1784	J.Meader; J.Hopper	T.Gilbert	Liverpool–Southern fishery	LR; lengthened and repaired 1782, & raised 1783

2nd whaling voyage (1785): Captain James Hopper sailed for the Southern Fishery in 1785. Quaker returned on 25 November with sperm and whale oil.

3rd whaling voyage (1786–1787): Quaker sailed in 1786. On 2 December she left the Falkland Islands. Hope, Edgar, master, and Mercury, Sheffield, master, were still whaling there when Quaker left. Quaker, Cropper, master, returned to Liverpool just before 30 March 1787.

4th whaling voyage (1787–1788): Quaker, Hopper, master, was reported to have been whaling at the Falkland Islands on 12 November 1787. She was off Dover on or before 11 July 1788. She returned with 37 tuns of whale oil and 10,400 seal skins.

On 3 October 1788 Quaker, Burnett, master, sailed from Gravesend for Barbados. She arrived at Barbados, sailed to Charleston, returned to Barbados, and sailed to Philadelphia. From Philadelphia Burnett sailed to Charente. Quaker arrived back at Gravesend on 30 October 1789.

Year	Master	Owner	Trade	Source & notes
1789	T.Burnett	S.Lee	London–Barbados	LR; lengthened and repaired 1782, & raised 1783
1793	Burnett; G.Knight	S.Lee	London–Barbados	LR; lengthened and repaired 1782, & raised 1783

Captain George Knight acquired a letter of marque on 11 September 1793. (Note: Captain Thomas Burnett transferred to a new Quaker.)

Year	Master	Owner	Trade	Source & notes
1795	G.Knight	S.Lee	London–Barbados	LR; lengthened & raised 1783, & good repair 1794

== Fate ==
Lloyd's List reported in September 1795 that Quaker, Knight, master, had been captured and taken into Guadeloupe. She had been sailing from London to Barbados.
