= Accomplished Quaker (1801 ship) =

History

United Kingdom
- Name: Accomplished Quaker
- Acquired: 1801 by purchase of a prize
- Fate: Lost 1804

General characteristics
- Tons burthen: 190 (bm)

Accomplished Quaker was a French vessel that the British captured circa 1801. She first appeared in Lloyd's Register (LR) in the volume for 1801.

Year	Master	Owner	Trade	Source & notes
1801	S.Truttle	J.Mills	London–Baltic	LR; small repairs

Lloyd's List reported on 20 November 1804 that as she was sailing from Archangel to London she wrecked near Drontheim. Her crew was saved.
