= Falmouth (1806 ship) =

History

United Kingdom
- Name: Falmouth
- Namesake: Falmouth
- Builder: Liverpool
- Launched: 1806
- Captured: c.September 1812

General characteristics
- Tons burthen: 426, or 434, or 435 (bm)
- Complement: 1806:50; 1806:63
- Armament: 1806:20 × 24&8-pounder cannons; 1806:2 × 6–pounder + 4 × 9-pounder guns + 18 × 24–pounder carronades

Falmouth was launched in 1806 at Liverpool as a slave ship in the triangular trade in enslaved people. After the British slave trade ended in 1807, she became a West Indiaman until a privateer captured her in 1812.

== Slave ship ==
Falmouth first appeared in Lloyd's Register (LR) in 1806, with Sherwood as master, Lett & Co. as owners, and trade listed as Liverpool–Africa. Captain William Sherwood acquired a letter of marque on 5 June 1806.

Captain William Sherwood sailed from Liverpool on 28 June 1806. Between 1 January 1806 and 1 May 1807, 185 vessels cleared Liverpool outward bound in the slave trade. Thirty of these vessels made two voyages during this period. Of the 185 vessels, 114 were regular slave ships, having made two voyages during the period, or voyages before 1806.

Falmouth acquired captives at Bonny Island. She arrived at Montego Bay on 14 January 1807, where she landed 395 captives. She left on 22 April, and arrived back at Liverpool on 14 June. She had left Liverpool with 63 crew members, and she suffered three crew deaths on the voyage.

== West Indiaman ==
The LR for 1807, showed her master changing to R.Watson. LR for 1808, showed him sailing Falmouth between Liverpool and Jamaica. He sailed from Cork on 11 November 1807, as part of the Jamaica fleet. In 1812, her master changed from R. Watson to M. Hill. Her trade was still London–Jamaica.

== Fate ==
The American privateer Thomas captured Falmouth as she was sailing from London to Jamaica. Falmouth reached Portland, Maine, in mid-September 1812. United States sources gave the value of Falmouth's cargo as $200,000.

The Register of Shipping (RS) for 1813, showed her master as W.Hill, her owners as Litt & Co., and her trade as Liverpool–West Indies. The entry carried the notation "Captured".

LR continued to carry Falmouth, with Hill as master and Jerwarris as owner, for a number of years. However the ship arrivals and departures data in Lloyd's List had no mention of a "Falmouth, Hill".
