= Falmouth (1796 ship) =

History

Great Britain
- Name: Falmouth
- Namesake: Falmouth, Cornwall
- Acquired: 1796
- Captured: 1797

General characteristics
- Tons burthen: 136 (bm)
- Armament: 6 × 6-pounder guns

Falmouth was built in America and entered Lloyd's Register in 1796. She became a Liverpool-based slave ship that a privateer captured during Falmouth's first voyage in the triangular trade in enslaved people.

Lloyd's Register listed her with Pearson, master, J.Hodgson, owner, and trade Liverpool–Africa.

Captain Richard Pearson sailed from Liverpool for West Africa on 21 July 1796.

In 1796, 103 British vessels sailed from British ports, bound on enslaving voyages. Ninety-four sailed from Liverpool.

Falmouth was reported in January 1797 to have reached Africa. She acquired captives at Îles de Los.

As she was on her way to Barbados, a Spanish privateer of 18 guns captured her.

Another report had a French squadron under "Renier" capturing Bell, Thompson master, Union, Galbraith, master, and Falmouth, Pearson, master, on the African Windward Coast. The French then gave Falmouth up to the crews.

It is quite possible that Falmouth was captured twice, first by the French and then by the Spanish privateer. There is no further mention of Falmouth in Lloyd's List for 1797 or 1798 after the above two reports, including no mention in the ship arrivals and departure (SAD) data, suggesting that if the French gave her up she did not return to England. Bell was on her eighth enslaving voyage when she was captured. Union was on her first enslaving voyage, and had not embarked any slaves before she was captured.

In 1797, 40 British vessels engaged in enslaving were lost. Thirteen were lost in the Middle Passage, i.e., while sailing from Africa to the West Indies. During the period 1793 to 1807, war, rather than maritime hazards or resistance by the captives, was the greatest cause of vessel losses among British enslaving vessels.
