= Quaker (1810 ship) =

History

United Kingdom
- Name: Quaker
- Namesake: Quakers
- Builder: Massachusetts
- Launched: 1800
- Fate: Last listed 1826

General characteristics
- Tons burthen: 177 (bm)
- Armament: 8 × 6-pounder guns

Quaker was launched in Massachusetts in 1800, possibly under another name. She came into British registers in 1810. She was last listed in 1826.

== Career ==
Quaker first appeared in Lloyd's Register (LR) in 1810.

On 5 October 1810 the gun-brig HMS Intelligent boarded Quaker while Quaker was returning to London from Trinidad.

Year	Master	Owner	Trade	Source
1810	Custance	J.Pirie	London–Trinidad	LR
1811	J.Custance; Linklater	J.Pirie	London–Trinidad; London–Rio de Janeiro	LR
1812	Linklter	J.Pirie; Thomas	London–Rio de Janeiro	LR
1815	Andrson; Nelson	E.Thomas	Plymouth–Charente	LR; small repairs 1813
1816	J.Nelson; G.Blow	Captain & Co.	London–Oporto	LR; small repairs 1813 and damages repaired 1816

On 13 December 1816, Quaker, Blow, master, was in the Downs, returning from Quebec. A gale cost Quaker an anchor and cable.

Year	Master	Owner	Trade	Source
1819	G.Blow	Captain & Co.	Plymouth–Gibraltar; London–Quebec	LR; small repairs 1813 and damages repaired 1816; hogged
1820	W.Anderson	Captain & Co.	London–Quebec	LR; small repairs 1813, damages repaired 1817, much hogged
1825	W.Anderson	Captain & Co.	Portsmouth–Quebec	RS; large repair 1818, small repairs 1816 & 1819
1826	W.Anderson	Captain & Co.	London–Quebec	LR; damages repaired 1817, much hogged

== Fate ==
Quaker was last listed in LR in 1826.
