= HMS Cyane =

Several ships of the Royal Navy have borne the name, HMS Cyane.

- HMS Cyane (1796) was an 18-gun sloop built in 1796 that the French captured in May 1805 and that the British recaptured in October, when she was renamed HMS Cerf; sold in 1809. She appeared in some records as Cayenne.
- HMS Cyane (1806) was a Banterer-class post ship built in 1806 and captured in 1815; she served in the US Navy thereafter and was broken up in 1836.
