= HMS Daedalus (1780) =

Frigate of the Royal Navy

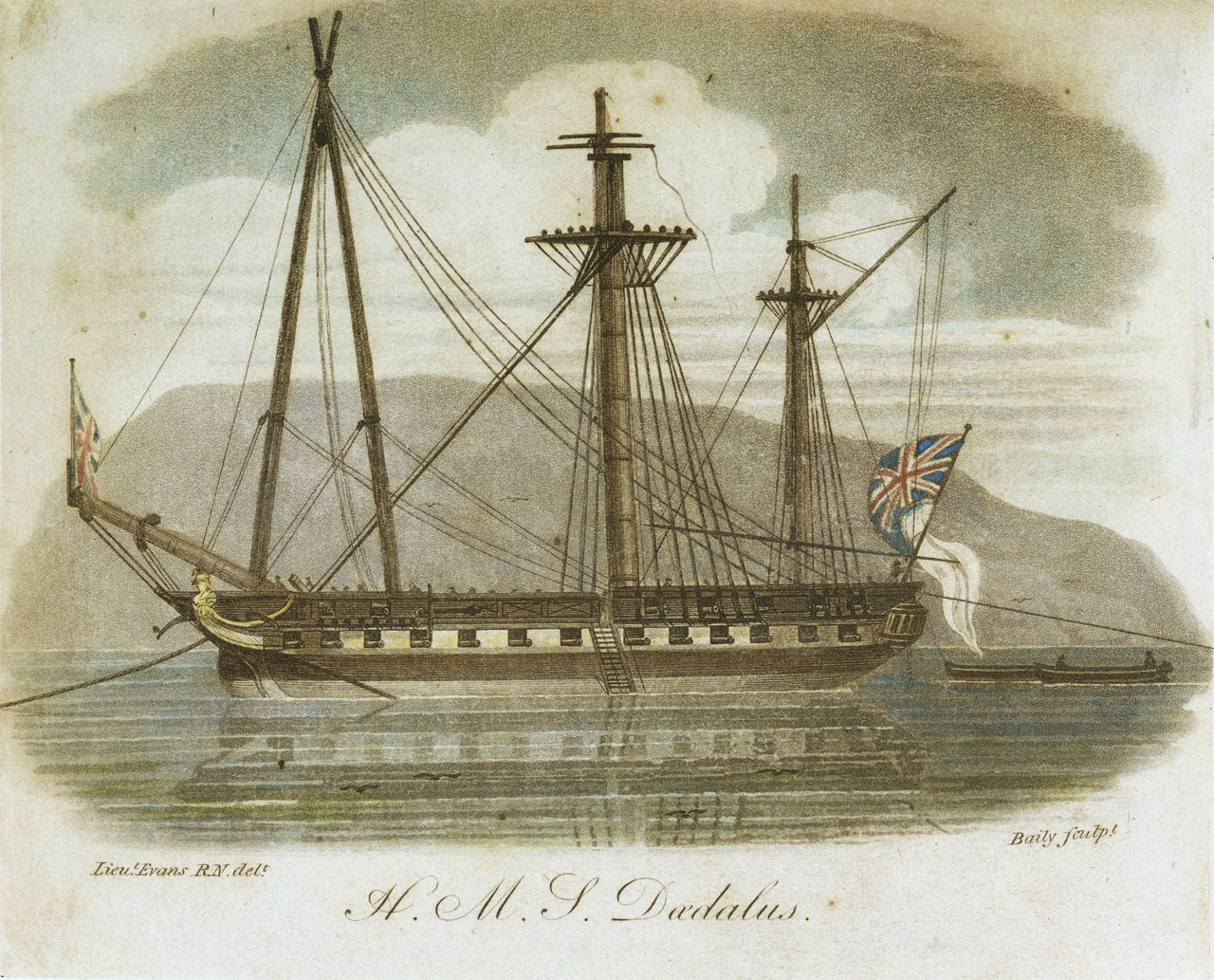
- Daedalus moored in Port Royal harbour, Jamaica, after having been dismasted in a hurricane off Puerto Rico, circa 1810

History

Great Britain
- Name: HMS Daedalus
- Ordered: 25 June 1778
- Builder: John Fisher, Liverpool
- Laid down: July 1778
- Launched: 20 May 1780
- Completed: 1780
- Fate: Broken up in July 1811

General characteristics
- Class & type: 32-gun Active-class frigate
- Type: Fifth Rate frigate
- Tons burthen: 70260/94 bm
- Length: Overall: 125 ft 7 in (38.3 m); Keel: 103 ft 1 in (31.4 m)
- Beam: 35 ft 8 in (10.9 m)
- Depth of hold: 11 ft 10.75 in (3.63 m)
- Sail plan: Full-rigged ship
- Complement: 250
- Armament: Upper deck: 26 × 12 pdrs; QD: 4 × 6–pounder guns + 4 × 24–pounder carronades; Fc: 2 × 6–pounder guns + 2 × 24–pounder carronades

HMS Daedalus was a 32-gun fifth rate frigate of the Royal Navy, launched in 1780 from the yards of John Fisher, of Liverpool. She went on to serve in the American War of Independence, as well as the French Revolutionary and Napoleonic Wars.

== American War of Independence ==
Daedalus entered service in 1780 under the command of Captain Thomas Pringle. He escorted a convoy to North America in May 1781, accompanied by Captain Horatio Nelson in the 28-gun Sixth rate HMS Albemarle. Pringle went on to serve in the English Channel the following year, capturing the French privateer Moustic on 20 January 1782, and the privateer Légère on 11 December 1782. Pringle escorted a convoy to Newfoundland during the year, and in 1783 was engaged in patrolling the Shetland fisheries. The Daedalus was paid off in July 1784, and in 1790 underwent a Great Repair at Rotherhithe, that lasted until 1793.

== French Revolutionary and Napoleonic Wars ==
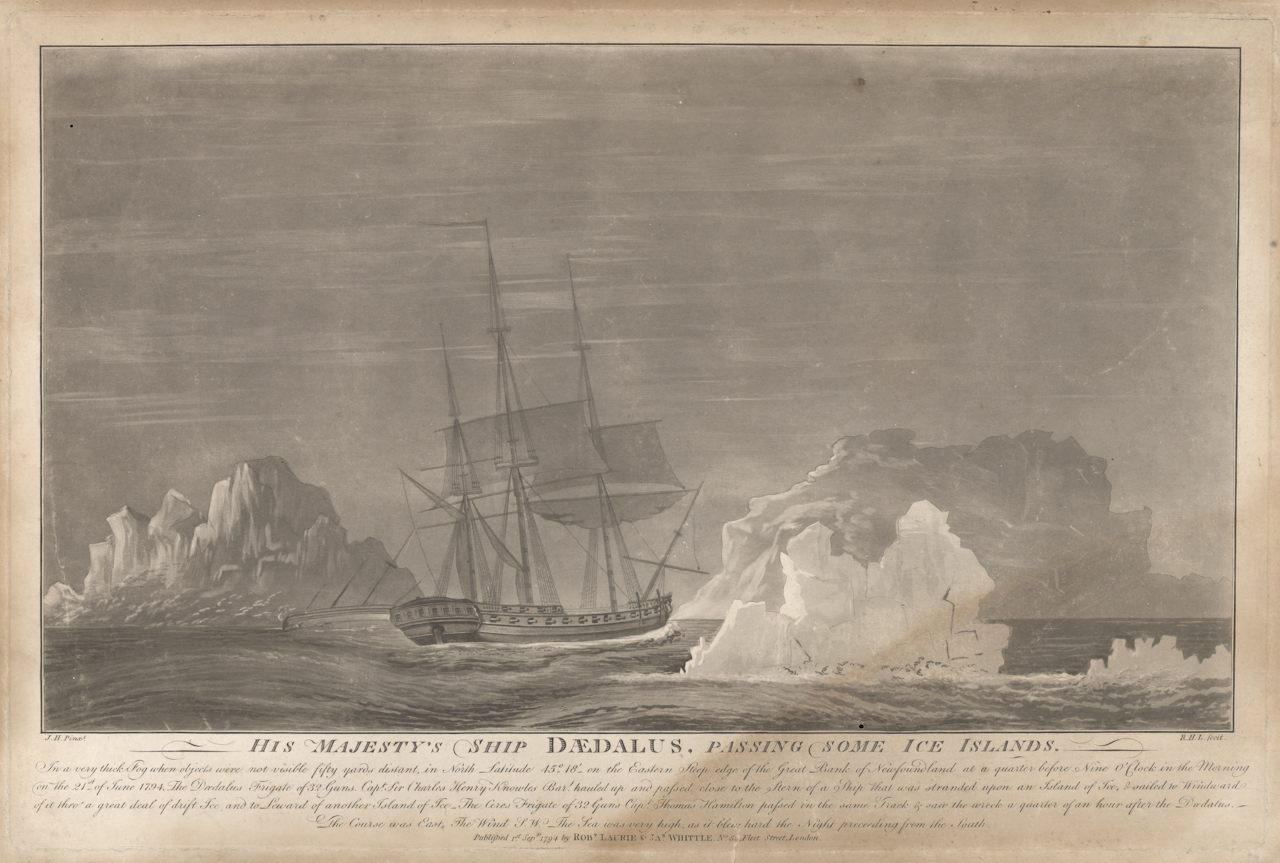
His Majesty's Ship Daedalus passing some ice islands - on the Eastern Steep edge of the Great Bank of Newfoundland on 21 June 1794

Captain Charles Henry Knowles recommissioned the Daedalus in March 1793, and sailed her to the Halifax station. Knowles was replaced by Captain Thomas Williams in September 1794, during which time Daedalus was part of Admiral Adam Duncan's fleet. In September 1795, Captain George Countess took over, and Daedalus sailed to the West African coast and then on to Jamaica. In January 1797, Daedalus was deployed against the French Expédition d'Irlande and on 8 January she was involved in the capture of the troopship Suffren and burnt her to avoid weakening the crew by dispersing them in the prize.

Command passed to Henry Lidgbird Ball in March 1797.

In late 1797 or early 1798 Daedalus and HMS Hornet captured six vessels off Gorée:

- American snow Rebecca, which had sailed from Charlestown. Her cargo included pitch, tar, dry goods, tobacco, molasses and gunpowder. The British took the naval and gunpowder, which they landed, and then released the vessel.
- American ship President, carrying a cargo of salt belonging to English merchants. The French had taken the ship off the Islands de Loss and the British had recaptured her off the mouth of the River Gambia. The British returned the vessel and her cargo to the owner after receiving salvage money.
- Ship Quaker, late of Liverpool, which was of 260 tons, 10 guns and a crew of 36. She was trading on the coast and had a cargo of merchandise and 337 enslaved people.
- Sloop Ocean, which the British recaptured and which had belonged to the Sierra Leone Company. She was carrying cloth, iron, beads and ten enslaved people.
- French schooner Prosperité, carrying Guinea Corn. She was disposed of at Gorée.
- The British destroyed the armed ship Bell, of 20 guns.

Daedalus and Hornet, and the letter of marque slave ships Ellis and Saint Ann shared, by agreement in the proceeds of the recapture of Quaker (December 1797) and Ocean (January 1798).

In the action of 9 February 1799, Daedalus captured the 36-gun Prudente off the Cape of Good Hope. He sailed on to the East Indies, operating successfully in the Dutch East Indies at Batavia Roads. During this time the Daedalus participated in the failed preliminary Raid on Manila Expedition, under the command of Captain G. Murray, with Arthur Wellesley, 1st Duke of Wellington on board. This expedition was designed to challenge Spanish control of the Philippines. However, the expedition faltered when the Daedalus ran aground on a sandbar at the head of the Hooghley River, and Colonel Wellesley landed in Penang, then returned to Calcutta via Madras. On 16 February 1799, the Daedalus under the command of Captain Ball, captured French frigate Prudente (1790) off the southeast coast of Africa. Command at this time passed temporarily to Lieutenant Charles James Johnson and then Captain William Waller before Daedalus returned to Britain and was placed in reserve in 1803. She was fitted out for service with Trinity House that year, followed by repair works from December 1805 to December 1806 to fit her out as a floating battery on the Thames at Woolwich. She recommissioned under Captain Frederick Warren in December 1806 and in March 1807 sailed for Jamaica. She was in action on 11 November 1808 when she helped in the capture of the town of Samana in San Domingo, also taking the 5-gun privateers Guerrière and Exchange.

== Fate ==
Command passed to Captain Samuel Inglefield, who transferred from HMS Bacchante in 1808. In November Daedalus was one of the vessels in the squadron under Sir Charles Dashwood. On 17 November the Franchise, Daedalus, Aurora, Reindeer and Pert, blockaded the city of Santo Domingo by taking possession of the town of Samaná, where the French were erecting batteries for their permanent establishment. Daedalus continued on the Jamaica station until a hurricane badly damaged her. A survey found her to be rotten throughout; she was paid off in October 1810 and broken up at Sheerness in July 1811.
