= Accomplished Quaker (1795 ship) =

History

Great Britain
- Name: Accomplished Quaker
- Launched: 1789
- Acquired: 1795 by purchase of a prize
- Fate: Captured circa 1795

General characteristics
- Tons burthen: 189 (bm)
- Complement: 10
- Armament: 8 × 6&9-pounder guns

Accomplished Quaker was a French vessel that the British captured circa 1795. She first appeared in Lloyd's Register (LR) in the volume for 1795.

Year	Master	Owner	Trade	Source & notes
1795	M.Walker	R.Johnson	Liverpool–Africa	LR; damages repaired 1795

Captain Musgrave Walker acquired a letter of marque on 22 August 1795. He sailed from Liverpool on 19 September 1795. A French privateer captured Accomplished Quaker and took her into Gorée before she could gather any slaves.

Accomplished Quaker did not appear on the lists of vessels cleared out of English ports bound for Africa.

In 1796, 22 British slave ships were lost. Three of these were lost on their way to Africa. War, not maritime hazards nor slave resistance, was the greatest cause of vessel losses among British slave vessels.
