= HMS Hornet (1794 sloop-of-war) =

British naval sloop (1794–1817)

- Hornet

History

Great Britain
- Name: HMS Hornet
- Ordered: 18 February 1793
- Builder: Marmaduke Stalkart, Rotherhithe
- Laid down: April 1793
- Launched: 3 February 1794
- Completed: 14 May 1794 at Deptford Dockyard
- Commissioned: January 1794
- Out of service: Sold 30 October 1817

General characteristics
- Class & type: 16-gun Cormorant-class sloop
- Tons burthen: 42855/94 (bm)
- Length: 109 ft 2 in (33.3 m) (overall); 91 ft 6 7/8 in (27.9 m) (keel)
- Beam: 29 ft 8 in (9.0 m)
- Depth of hold: 9 ft (2.74 m)
- Propulsion: Sails
- Sail plan: Sloop
- Complement: 121
- Armament: 16 × 6-pounder guns + 12 × 1/2-pounder swivel guns

HMS Hornet was a 16-gun ship-rigged sloop of the Cormorant class in the Royal Navy, ordered 18 February 1793, built by Marmaduke Stalkart and launched 3 February 1794 at Rotherhithe. (Note: There was a second HMS Hornet (1796); she was a purchased Dutch hoy that was in service for about a year.) Hornet saw most of her active duty during the French Revolutionary Wars. During the Napoleonic Wars she served for about six years as a hospital ship before being laid up in 1811 and sold in 1817.

== Career ==
Hornet was commissioned in March 1794 under Commander Christmas Paul. On 26 June 1794 she fired a salute to the King and Queen while they were visiting Portsmouth. Hornet shared with Bellona, America, Severn, and Carysfort in the capture of the Lust en Vlyt on 22 August.

Hornet was then paid off February 1795 and recommissioned under Lieutenant William Lukin. In January 1796 Commander Robert Larkan sailed her in Home waters. On 4 February 1796 Hornet was in company with the hired armed cutter Grand Falconer when they recaptured the Portuguese brig Diana. Next, on 17 May, Hornet captured the French transport Emilie. Then in November 1796, Commander John Nash replaced Larkan.

On 10 March 1798 the Admiralty published a list of six vessels that Daedalus, under Captain Henry Lidgbird Ball, and Hornet had captured off Gorée:

- American snow Rebecca, which had sailed from Charlestown. Her cargo included pitch, tar, dry goods, tobacco, molasses and gunpowder. The British took the naval and gunpowder, which they landed, and then released the vessel.
- American ship President, carrying a cargo of salt belonging to English merchants. The French had taken the ship off the Islands de Loss and the British had recaptured her off the mouth of the River Gambia. The British returned the vessel and her cargo to the owner after receiving salvage money.
- Ship Quaker, late of Liverpool, which the British recaptured. She was of 260 tons, 10 guns and a crew of 36. She was trading on the coast and had a cargo of merchandise and 337 slaves.
- Sloop Ocean, which the British recaptured and which had belonged to the Sierra Leone Company. She was carrying cloth, iron, beads and ten slaves.
- French schooner Prosperité, carrying Guinea Corn. She was disposed of at Gorée.
- The British destroyed the armed ship Bell, of 20 guns.

Daedalus, Hornet, and the letter of marque slave ships Ellis and Saint Ann shared, by agreement, in the capture of Quaker (December 1797) and Ocean (January 1798).

Hornet was refitted for £3,554 at Portsmouth in June and July 1799. In August Hornet was part of the British fleet that captured the Dutch fleet in the Vlieter Incident. (Note: In February 1802 prize money was payable for the captures on 28 August that amounted to 6s 8d for a seaman. Payment for the captures on 30 August came later, in December 1802.)

Nash then sailed Hornet to the West Indies. In 1800 she accompanied a convoy to the West Indies.

While at Guadeloupe in October, a boat from Hornet attempted to press some men off the New Ceres, whose crew resisted, killing Hornet's second lieutenant, and wounding another crewman. The next day Hornet tried again, this time in force, but all the crew except the chief mate and steward had disappeared. Captain Nash turned the two men over to the civil authorities.

On 27 November 1800, Hornet captured the French privateer Femme Divorcee. On 16 October Hornet captured the French privateer Mahomet. (Note: The prize money for commissioned officers was £sd3 11s 4d; the prize money for an able seaman was 4s 2d.)

On 15 January 1801, the 20-gun Daphne, Captain Richard Matson, 18-gun ship-sloops Cyane and Hornet, captains Henry Matson and John Nash, and the Garland (a schooner serving as a tender), were at an anchor in the harbour of the Îles des Saintes. The British observed a convoy of French coasters, with an armed schooner as escort, sailing towards Vieux-Fort, Guadeloupe. At midnight Garland, together with two boats from each of the other three vessels, attempted to cut out the convoy. However, all of the convoy, but one, were able to shelter under the guns of Basse-Terre. The British were able to take the one French vessel that had anchored near Vieux-Fort.

On 17 January, boats from Hornet, together with boats from Daphne, set out to cut out a ship moored under the protection of shore batteries at Trois-Rivières, Guadeloupe. This was Eclair, a schooner that had recently sailed from Rochefort. Eclair was of 145 tons, had a crew of 45 men, and was armed with four 4-pounder guns and twenty 1½-pounder brass swivel guns, though she was pierced for 12 guns. A party from Garland succeeded in taking Eclair the next day. Fire from the schooner killed two men and wounded another. The French lost one seaman killed, two drowned, and her captain, first and second lieutenants, and six men wounded. The British took her into service as the 10-gun HMS Eclair.

In March, Hornet participated in Rear Admiral Duckworth's successful attack on the islands of St. Bartholomew and St. Martin. On 23 March, Hornet and the 16-gun hired armed brig Fanny, later joined by 14-gun Drake, attempted to capture two privateers, a brig and a schooner, but were unsuccessful though they chased the privateers for some 24 hours. The 32-gun frigate Proselyte, Hornet, and Drake stayed at St. Martin to secure the island and to embark the garrison on 26 March, while the rest of Duckworth's force went on to St Thomas. The proceeds of the property seized at St. Bartholomew, St. Martin, St. Thomas, and St. Croix between 15 March and 17 April was paid out in January 1804.

At some point thereafter, Hornet was in company with Apollo when they captured the Spanish vessel Aguilla.

On or about 26 November 1801 Hornet encountered Friendship, a Liverpool slave ship, which was under the control of mutineers. Hornet took Friendship into Carlisle Bay, Barbados.

In August 1802 Hornet came under the command of Lieutenant Robert Tucker. Next month Commander Peter Hunt replaced Tucker.

In June 1803, Hornet was in Commodore Samuel Hood's squadron at the capture of St. Lucia. The squadron, including Hornet, went on to capture Tobago on 25 June. On 3 September Hornet captured a Dutch ship, whose name was not recorded, that was carrying 410 slaves. (Note: The vessel was Reimsdyke, of 281 tons (bm), that had been launched at Batavia in 1796. The capture took place off the Suriname River. The capture resulted in a court case over the prize money.)

Then in September Hood went on to take the colonies of Demerara and Essequibo from the Batavian Republic. On 20 September Hornet, the schooner Netley, and 200 troops entered the Demerara River and took possession of Fort William Frederick. At the capitulation, the British took over the Batavian Republic's sole warship there, Hippomenes. Hunt and Hornet carried back to England Hood's dispatches announcing the capture of Demerara. On Hunts arrival he was promoted to post captain.

In 1804 Commander John Lawrence took command of Hornet.

== Hospital ship ==
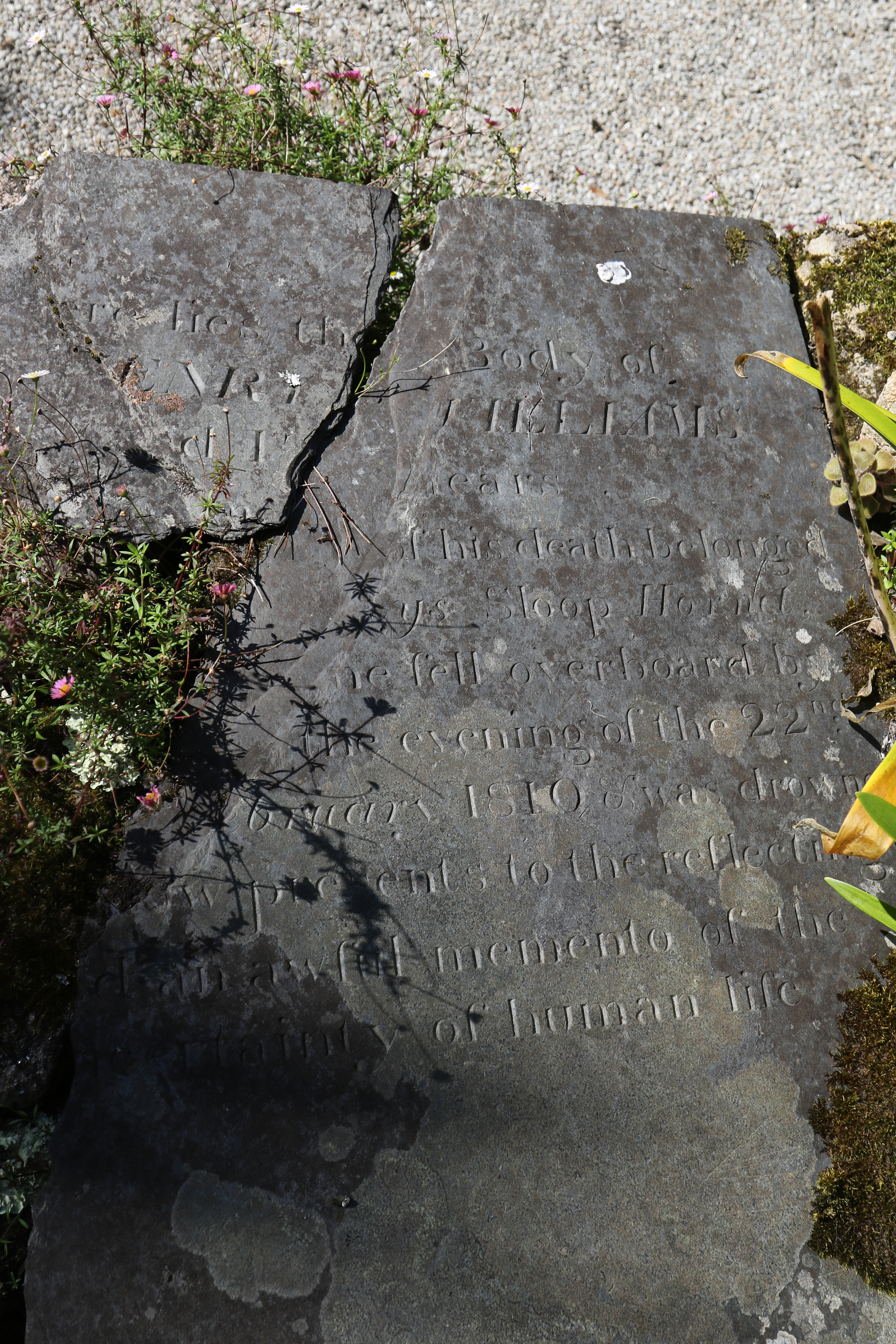
Grave of Henry Williams in Tresco Abbey Gardens

Paid off in 1804 from active service, Hornet was fitted at Plymouth between September 1804 and July 1805 for the Medical Military Staff, and was commissioned in June 1805 under Lieutenant Charles Williams as a hospital ship in the Isles of Scilly. Charles's brother, Henry Williams, fell overboard in 1810 and was drowned. He was buried in the Tresco Abbey Gardens.

== Fate ==
Hornet was paid off from her service as a hospital ship and was laid up at Plymouth Dockyard in May 1811. The "Principal Officers and Commissioners of His Majesty's Navy" first offered the "Hornet sloop, of 429 tons", lying at Plymouth, for sale on 30 January 1817.

Hornet finally sold on 30 October 1817 to a Mr Bailey for £920 (equivalent to £68,142 in 2025). (Note: UK Consumer Price Index inflation figures are based on data from Gregory Clark (2017), "The Annual RPI and Average Earnings for Britain, 1209 to Present (New Series)")

== Notable personnel ==
From November 1795 to September 1797, Richard Spencer, a future hero of the Napoleonic Wars and Australian pioneer, served as a midshipman on Hornet.
