= Quaker (1793 ship) =

History

Great Britain
- Name: Quaker
- Builder: Tynemouth
- Launched: 1793
- Captured: 1795, 1798
- Fate: Wrecked December 1806

General characteristics
- Tons burthen: 199, or 200, or 201 (bm)
- Complement: 1793:18; 1798:28
- Armament: 1793:14 × 6&4-pounder guns; 1798:12 × 6-pounder guns; 1805:8 × 4&6-pounder guns

Quaker was launched at Tynemouth in 1793 as a West Indiaman. The French captured her in 1795 but in a process that is currently obscure she returned to British ownership. In 1797 she became a slave ship, sailing out of Liverpool in the triangular trade in enslaved people. On her first voyage transporting enslaved people, the French captured after she had gathered her captives, but the British Royal Navy recaptured her. She resumed her voyage but before she could deliver her captives the French captured her again. She returned to British ownership in 1805, but wrecked in December 1806.

== Career ==
Quaker first entered Lloyd's Register (LR) in 1794.

Year	Master	Owner	Trade	Source
1794	T.Branett	Blackman	Tynemouth–Barbados	LR
1794	T.Burnett	Blackman	Tynemouth–Barbados	LR

Captain Thomas Burnet acquired a letter of marque on 9 December 1793. (Note: Thomas Burnett transferred to Quaker from an earlier Quaker.)

Lloyd's List (LL) reported on 4 February 1794, that Quaker, Burnett, master, from Cork to Barbados, had arrived at Penzance having lost her bowsprit, sails, etc., and having had to throw some of her cargo overboard. She had sailed from Cork on 26 January.

Then about two months later, Lloyd's List reported that Union, of Boston, had arrived at Cowes from Brest with the news that Quaker, Burnett, master, from Cork to Barbados, "was carried into that port." It is not clear whether the report was in error, or whether Quaker returned to British ownership by recapture, or by other means.

Year	Master	Owner	Trade	Source
1796	T.Burnett; D.Roberts	Blackman; P.Branker	Teignmouth–Barbados; Liverpool–Africa	LR
1798	D.Roberts	P.Branker	Liverpool–Africa	LR

Captain James Robertson sailed from Liverpool on 17 January 1797. In 1797, 104 vessels sailed from English ports to acquire and transport captives from Africa; 90 of these vessels sailed from Liverpool.

Quaker acquired captives at Anomabu and Whydah. Lloyd's List reported on 29 December 1797, that "Renoir's Squadron" had taken Quaker, Robertson, master, of Liverpool, off Whydah. (Note: "Renoir" was probably Jean-Marie Renaud, who was operating off Gorée at that time.) A report in March stated that Quaker, of Liverpool, with 350 captives, and African Queen, of Bristol, Buckle, master, had been retaken on the coast of Africa. African Queen was on a trading voyage to Africa, not a voyage to transport captives, and returned to Bristol. Quaker continued her voyage, sailing to the West Indies, but apparently with a new master.

In 1797, 40 British slave ships were lost. Eleven were lost before they could embark any slaves. It is not clear if the loss figures are gross or net of recaptures.

Quaker's recaptors were HMS Daedalus and Hornet, and she was one of six ships that they captured or recaptured off Gorée. The notice in the London Gazette described Quaker as "late of Liverpool". She was of 260 tons, 10 guns and a crew of 36. She was trading on the coast and had a cargo of merchandise and 337 captives. (Note: Another account gave the number of captives aboard Quaker as 388. Under Dolben's Act, she was authorized to carry no more than 335 captives. Any more and she would have incurred and penalty on her return to England.) Daedalus and Hornet shared by agreement with Ellis and Saint Ann in the proceeds of the recapture between December 1797 and January 1798 of Ocean and Quaker.

The next report in Lloyd's List was that Quaker, Jones, master, from Africa to Saint Kitts, had been taken and sent into Guadaloupe.

Quaker reappeared in LR in 1805. Again, it is currently unclear by what process she had returned to British ownership.

Year	Master	Owner	Trade	Source
1805	J.Irvin	Captain	Bristol–Honduras	LR

== Fate ==
Quaker sailed to Honduras, from Honduras to New York, and then from New York to London. On 16 December 1806 Lloyd's List reported that Quaker, Irwin, master, had been lost on the Margate Sand. Her crew and part of her cargo had been saved.
