= HMS Falmouth =

Nine ships of the Royal Navy have borne the name HMS Falmouth, after the town of Falmouth:

- English ship Falmouth (1652) was a 30-gun ship, formerly the Dutch Rotterdam. She was captured in 1652 and sold in 1658.
- HMS Falmouth (1693) was a 58-gun fourth rate launched in 1693 and captured by French privateers in the Mediterranean in 1704.
- HMS Falmouth (1708) was a 50-gun fourth rate launched in 1708. She was reconstructed in 1729 and broken up in 1747.
- HMS Falmouth (1752) was a 50-gun fourth rate launched in 1752. She was beached and abandoned at Batavia on 16 January 1765 after suffering serious battle damage off Manila.
- HMS Falmouth (1807) was a schooner launched in 1807. She was used as a dockyard vessel until 1824 when she was converted to a mortar vessel. She reverted to a dockyard lighter in 1846 and was renamed YC1. She was renamed YC46 in 1870, reverting to Falmouth in 1870, and was sold in 1883.
- HMS Falmouth (1814) was a 22-gun sixth rate launched in 1814 and sold in 1825.
- HMS Falmouth was to have been a wooden screw sloop, ordered from Deptford Dockyard in 1860 and cancelled in the same year.
- HMS Falmouth was to have been a wood screw corvette laid down in 1861 at Chatham Dockyard and cancelled in 1863.
- HMS Falmouth (1910) was a Town-class cruiser launched in 1910 and sunk in 1916.
- HMS Falmouth (L34) was a Shoreham-class sloop launched in 1932. She was renamed HMS Calliope in January 1952 and was reassigned as a drill ship. She was broken up in 1968.
- HMS Falmouth (F113) was a Rothesay-class anti-submarine frigate launched in 1959. She was used as a training ship at Harwich from 1984 until 1988, when she was sold for scrapping.

== Battle honours ==
Ships named Falmouth have earned the following battle honours:

- Kentish Knock 1652
- Portland 1653
- Gabbard 1653
- Scheveningen 1653
- Heligoland 1914
- Jutland 1916
- East Indies 1940
