= Pongo River (Guinea) =

River in Guinea

Coordinates: 10°3′N 14°4′W

Designations

Ramsar Wetland
- Official name: Rio Pongo
- Designated: 18 November 1992
- Reference no.: 574

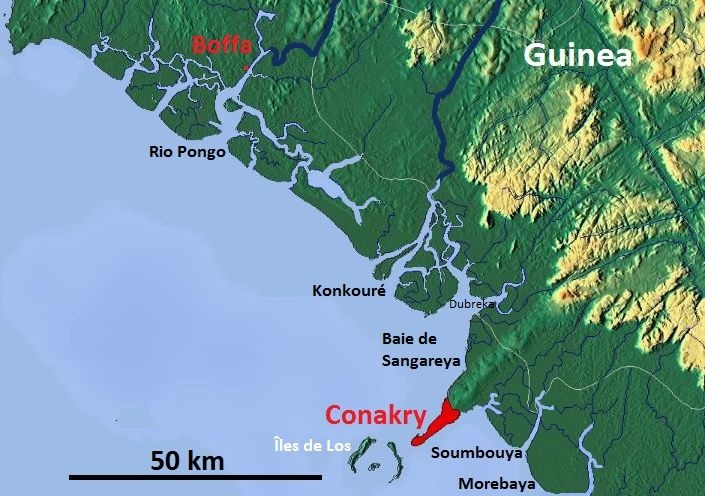

The Pongo River or Rio Pongo is a river that flows into the Atlantic Ocean near Boffa, Guinea. Its source is located in Fouta Djallon. The surrounding area has also been known as "Pongoland" or "Bongo Country".

== Environment ==
The estuary has been designated as a Ramsar site since 1992. The 30,000 ha site mainly consists of mangrove forest and intertidal mudflat habitats. African manatees are present. The site has also been designated an Important Bird Area (IBA) by BirdLife International because it supports significant populations of waterbirds.

== History ==
Rio Pongo became a significant area for the setting up factories in the transatlantic slave trade. Sir George Collier listed 76 surnames of families involved in the slave trade in 1820. He was commodore of the British West Africa Squadron between 1818 and 1821 and as such organised anti-slaving patrols up the Pongo River and other surrounding areas.

== In literature ==
Part of the plot of the historical novel Anthony Adverse – and the film made of it – is chiefly set on the Pongo River, in the last years of the 18th century and the first years of the 19th. The book's eponymous protagonist – an adventurous and highly capable young man – arrives from Cuba and in a brief time takes personal control of slave trading along the river. He amasses a considerable personal fortune, but at the price of becoming increasingly corrupted. Finally being sickened by slaving, he departs for other adventures in other continents.
