= Fortune (1800 ship) =

History

France
- Name: La Fortune
- Builder: Bordeaux
- Launched: 1800
- Captured: 15 July 1800

United Kingdom
- Name: Fortune, or La Fortune
- Acquired: circa 1801 b purchase of a prize
- Fate: Last listed 1816

General characteristics
- Tons burthen: 492, or 501, or 513 bm)
- Complement: French privateer: 202; British service; 1800: 60; 1805: 35; 1807: 45; 1808: 50; 1810: 30
- Armament: French privateer: 16 × 12-pounder + 4 × 12-pounder long guns, + 2 × 36-pounder brass carronades; British service: 1801: 22 × 12-pounder guns; 1805: 4 × 9-pounder guns + 16 × 18-pounder carronades; 1807: 4 × 9-pounder guns + 16 × 18-pounder carronades; 1808: 2 × 9-pounder guns + 14 × 18-pounder carronades; 1810: 2 × 9-pounder guns + 12 × 18-pounder carronades

Fortune (or La Fortune) was a French privateer launched at Bordeaux in 1800 and taken that same year. She immediately made one voyage as a whaler and privateer. She then made two voyages as a slave ship in the triangular trade in enslaved people. After the end of the British enslaving trade Fortune continued to trade with Africa and with South America. She was last listed in 1816.

== Capture ==
Fortune was a 400-ton privateer commissioned in Bayonne in February 1800 for a shipowner from Bordeaux. She was under a Captain Bastéré (or Bretée) with 17 officers and 163 to 186 men, with 22 guns.

On 13 July 1800 HMS Ruby was escorting a convoy from St Helena to Great Britain when at 45°N 29°W when she sighted a strange sail that appeared to be a French privateer. Winds were light and next morning Ruby sighted the privateer some three miles ahead. Ruby was unable to catch the privateer, which made use of sweeps to remain just out of gunshot. Towards evening a breeze came up and Ruby succeeded in capturing the privateer at 1a.m. on 15 July.

The privateer was La Fortune, of Bordeaux. She was a new vessel, strongly built, fully copper-fastened, and a good sailer. She was on only her second cruise. She had been out a month but had succeeded only in capturing the brig Fame, which had been sailing from Sierra Leone to London. La Fortune was armed with sixteen 18-pounder guns, four long iron 12-pounder guns, and two 36-pounder brass carronades. (Note: The carronades were probably obusiers de vaisseau.) Captain Solomon Ferris, of Ruby recommended that the Navy acquire La Fortune.

== Career ==
Fortune first appeared in the Register of Shipping in 1801.

Year	Master	Owner	Trade	Source
1801	Harlerow	Curtis & Co.	London–Southern fishery	RS

Captain Sinclair Halcrow acquired a letter of marque on 9 October 1800. By one account he sailed for the Southern Whale Fishery in 1801. In January 1802 Fortune stopped in at Rio de Janeiro for water and food. Halcrow was an experienced whaling captain, but open to other opportunities as well. On 21 March 1801, La Fortune privateer, Captain Halcrow, was in Saldanha Bay. She had taken five prizes: two Spanish brigs, a snow, a sloop, and a Hamburg ship carrying naval stores to Mauritius. (Note: Saldanha Bay is a bay where British whalers caught right whales. It was common for whalers to fish the Brazil Banks and the south-west coast of Africa, taking advantage also of the protection that Saint Helena could provide.) She returned to England on 8 April 1802. In January 1803 Halcrow sailed Sea Horse on a whaling voyage.

The Register of Shipping and other sources carried Fortune as continuing to whale for some years.

Year	Master	Owner	Trade	Source
1804	Harlerow	Captain & co.	London–Southern fishery	RS

From 1805 on Fortune made two voyages as an enslaving ship, operating from Liverpool.

1st slave voyage (1805–1806): Captain Charles Watt acquired a letter of marque on 1 April 1805. He sailed from Liverpool on 25 April. Fortune started acquiring captves at the Congo River on 16 July. On 5 September the Liverpool ships La Fortune, Roehampton, and Kitty, were lying in the Congo River, together with the American ships Cleopatra, Africa, and Daphne. The Liverpool ships Roe, Sisters, Active, Rellena, and Clarendon were at Cabenda and Malemba. There was a report that a group of three French privateers of 16 to 22 guns might be in the area.

Fortune left Africa on 10 November and arrived at Nassau, Bahamas, on 21 December. Captain Watt had died on 14 December, shortly before she arrived at Nassau. She sailed from Nassau on 29 March 1806 and arrived back at Liverpool on 2 May. Captain Hugh Bridson had replaced Watt, and at some point Captain R. Kelly had replaced Bridson. Fortune had left Liverpool with 67 crew members and suffered 11 crew deaths on the voyage.

On this voyage the gross profit was £13,271 0s 1d. Of this, 2/3 accrued to Thomas Leyland. The costs for the voyage were £11,302 17s 4d. To the profit one must add £7,609 7s 6d sold on credit.

The owners made a net profit of £9,47 10s 3d on the voyage. The profit per captive averaged £27 13s 2d. This result was highly satisfactory to the owners, if not to the captives. (Note: Leyland had five enslaving vessels that returned and whose voyages's profits were reported: Louisa, Lottery, on her third enslaving voyage, Lottery, on her sixth enslaving voyage, Enterprise, and Fortune. On a per captive, basis, Fortune's voyage was the fourth most profitable, and close to that of the least profitable.)

The captives had sold very slowly; 100 were left on the factors' hands on 31 July 1806. The last batch of these was sold in September. The result was a big bill for rent of store, doctor's attendance, provisions, brandy, wine, tobacco, heads and offals, oil, etc., for the captives. Captain Watt, the third mate, and six seamen had died on the voyage; two sailors drowned. The fifth or trading mate, and one of the men ran away. While she was at Nassau 34 seamen joined or were impressed on board Royal Navy ships on the station.

2nd slave voyage (1807–1808): Captain Archibald Keenan acquired a letter of marque on 12 March 1807. He sailed on 26 April, sailing before 1 May, the day on which the Slave Trade Act 1807, which banned British vessels from participating in enslaving voyages, took effect. Fortune acquired captive at Bonny. She arrived at Kingston, Jamaica on 19 November with 343 captives. She sailed from Jamaica on 24 May 1808 and arrived back at Liverpool on 12 July.

Year	Master	Owner	Trade	Source
1808	A.Kennan; L.Hall	Seyland; W.Brown	Liverpool–Africa	RS; repairs 1808

Captain Lawrence Hall acquired a letter of marque on 24 November 1808.

Year	Master	Owner	Trade	Source
1810	L.Hall	W.Brown	Liverpool–South America	RS; repairs 1808

Captain Alexander Williams acquired a letter of marque on 16 April 1810.

The RS did not recognize the change in masters from Hall to Williams until its 1813 issue.

Year	Master	Owner	Trade	Source
1813	L.Hall; A.Williams	W.Brown	Liverpool–South America	RS; repairs 1808

== Fate ==
Fortune was last listed in LR in 1816.

Year	Master	Owner	Trade	Source
1816	A.Williams	W.Brown	London–Trieste	LR; repairs 1808

The last mention of her in the press was on 4 June 1816. She had returned to Liverpool from Trieste and then Havana with a cargo that included 50 kegs of quicksilver, 62 tierces of sugar, 327 tons of logwood, 13 tons of fustic, 35 oars, 24 planks, and 60 spars.
