= List of shipwrecks in 1787 =

The List of shipwrecks in 1787 includes some ships sunk, wrecked or otherwise lost during 1787.

table of contents
1787
Jan	Feb	Mar	Apr
May	Jun	Jul	Aug
Sep	Oct	Nov	Dec
Unknown date

== January ==
=== 13 January ===
List of shipwrecks: 13 January 1787
Ship	State	Description
Barbara	Hamburg	The ship was driven ashore and wrecked at Cádiz, Spain. She was on a voyage from Hamburg to Cádiz.
John and Mary	Great Britain	The ship was driven ashore and wrecked at Cádiz. She was on a voyage from Great Yarmouth, Norfolk to Genoa.
L'Amedée Théodore	France	The ship was driven ashore at Cádiz. She was on a voyage from Cherbourg to Alicante, Spain.
Les Pleyades	Spain	The ship was driven ashore at Cádiz. She was on a voyage from Bilbao to Cádiz.
Maria	(Denmark) Norway	The ship was driven ashore and wrecked at Cádiz. She was on a voyage from Norway to Genoa.
Mira	Great Britain	The ship was wrecked at Cádiz.
Neptune	Great Britain	The ship was driven ashore at Cádiz. She was on a voyage from Great Yarmouth to Livorno, Grand Duchy of Tuscany.
Severver	Spain	The ship was driven ashore at Cádiz with the loss of seven of her crew. She was on a voyage from Rotterdam to Seville Spain.

=== Unknown date ===
List of shipwrecks: Unknown date in January 1787
Ship	State	Description
Adelaid	Great Britain	The ship was lost near Port St. Mary, Isle of Man.
Ann	Great Britain	The ship was lost near Alicante, Spain. She was on a voyage from Málaga to Alicante.
Aurora	Great Britain	The ship was driven ashore near Greenock, Renfrewshire. She was on a voyage from Greenock to Jamaica.
Betsey	Great Britain	Captain Murphy's ship was driven ashore and wrecked near Cádiz, Spain.
Betsey	Great Britain	Captain Wilson's ship was lost between Gibraltar and Málaga.
Betty	Great Britain	The ship was driven ashore near Conil de la Frontera, Spain. She was on a voyage from Altea to London.
Bilboa Packet	Great Britain	The ship was lost with all hands whilst on a voyage from Gallipoli, Ottoman Empire to London.
Christie	Ireland	The ship was driven ashore near Conil de la Frontera. She was on a voyage from Málaga to Dublin.
Confidence	France	The ship was lost in Málaga Bay. She was on a voyage from Marseille to Havre de Grâce.
Endeavour	Great Britain	The ship was driven ashore and wrecked at "Arzilla". She was on a voyage from Great Yarmouth, Norfolk to Gibraltar.
Esperanza	Spain	The ship was driven ashore in the Bay of St. Mary's.
Gustaff	Sweden	The ship ran aground on the Goodwin Sands, Kent, Great Britain and was abandoned by her crew. She was subsequently taken in to Ramsgate, Kent. Gustaff was on a voyage from Gothenburg to Saint-Malo, France.
Gustavus Adolphus	Sweden	The ship was driven ashore on the Spanish coast.
Henry	Great Britain	The ship was driven ashore near Hurst Castle, Hampshire. She was on a voyage from Porto, Portugal to Dundee, Perthshire. Henry was later refloated and taken in to Cowes, Isle of Wight for repairs.
Kent	Great Britain	The ship was lost near Cape Spartel, Morocco with the loss of ten of the eighteen people on board.
Lily of the Valley	Ireland	The ship foundered off the French coast. She was on a voyage from Limerick to Bordeaux.
London Packet	Great Britain	The ship was driven ashore near Boulogne, France. She was on a voyage from Guernsey, Channel Islands to London.
Mary	Great Britain	The ship foundered in the Strait of Gibraltar. She was on a voyage from Spain to London.
Mercury	Great Britain	The ship foundered within 6 leagues 18 nautical miles (33 km)) of Kinsale, County Cork, Ireland. Her crew were rescued by Resolution (Great Britain).
Nathaniel and Mary	Great Britain	The ship foundered in the Firth of Forth in early January. She was on a voyage from Great Yarmouth, Norfolk to Leith, Lothian.
Neptune	Great Britain	The ship was driven ashore near Ballycastle, County Antrim, Ireland. She was on a voyage from Liverpool, Lancashire to Londonderry, Ireland.
Neptune	Great Britain	The ship was lost near Great Yarmouth. She was on a voyage from London to Tingmouth, County Durham.
Neptune	Dutch Republic	The ship was driven ashore at Ostend. She was on a voyage from Cette, France to Ostend.
Peggy	Great Britain	The ship was wrecked on the Cockle Sand, in the North Sea off the coast of Norfolk. She was on a voyage from Alloa, Clackmannanshire to London.
Penelope	Republic of Venice	The ship was driven ashore at Gibraltar.
Perseverance	Great Britain	The ship capsized off Carrickfergus, County Antrim, Ireland. Her crew were rescued.
Province	Great Britain	The brigantine was wrecked at Vilassar de Mar, Spain. Her crew were rescued.
Star Cross	Great Britain	The ship was wrecked on the coast of Cornwall. She was on a voyage from Bilbao, Spain to Exeter, Devon.
Sykes	Ireland	The ship was driven ashore at Seaford, Sussex, Great Britain. She was on a voyage from Rouen, France to Dublin.
Union	Great Britain	The ship was lost near St. Andero, Spain. She was on a voyage from Bilbao to Teignmouth, Devon.
William	Great Britain	The ship was lost in the Black River, Jamaica. She was on a voyage from the Musquito Shore to London.

== February ==
=== 9 February ===
List of shipwrecks: 9 February 1787
Ship	State	Description
Union	Ireland	The ship was wrecked on the Isle of Mull, Scotland. She was on a voyage from Boston, Massachusetts, United States to Dublin.

=== 11 February ===
List of shipwrecks: 11 February 1787
Ship	State	Description
Barbara	Great Britain	The ship was driven ashore and wrecked 3 leagues (9 nautical miles (17 km)) from Cádiz, Spain with the loss of five of her twelve crew. She was on a voyage from Sandwich, Kent to Barcelona, Spain.
Hope	Denmark	The brig was lost near St. Lucar, Spain. She was on a voyage from Trondheim, Norway to Barcelona.

=== 12 February ===
List of shipwrecks: 12 February 1787
Ship	State	Description
Calonne	(Kingdom of France) French East India Company	The East Indiaman was driven ashore and wrecked at "St. Augan", near St. Ubes, Portugal with the loss of 36 of around 71 people on board. She was on a voyage from Pondicherry, India to L'Orient.

=== 15 February ===
List of shipwrecks: 15 February 1787
Ship	State	Description
Anna Maria	Dutch Republic	The ship ran aground on the Goodwin Sands, Kent, Great Britain. She was taken in to Ramsgate, Kent, where she sank. Anna Maria was later refloated and found to be severely damaged. She was on a voyage from Naples, Kingdom of Sicily to Ostend.

=== 18 February ===
List of shipwrecks: 15 February 1787
Ship	State	Description
Vigilant	Great Britain	The ship foundered in the Baltic Sea with the loss of four of her crew. She was on a voyage from Liverpool, Lancashire to Dantzick.

=== Unknown date ===
List of shipwrecks: Unknown date in February 1787
Ship	State	Description
City of Wologda	(Denmark) Norway	The ship was lost on "Keilden Island". She was on a voyage from Arkhangelsk, Russia to Bergen.
Friends	Great Britain	The ship was driven ashore and wrecked at Studland, Dorset. She was on a voyage from Havre de Grâce, France to Liverpool, Lancashire.
Friendship	Great Britain	The ship foundered in the Bay of Biscay off Arcasson, France with the loss of all hands. She was on a voyage from Dartmouth, Devon to San Sebastián, Spain.
Janus	France	The ship foundered in the Atlantic Ocean off the Isles of Scilly, Great Britain. She was on a voyage from Dunkirk to Cap-François, Saint-Domingue.
Oak	Great Britain	The ship was driven ashore near Civita Vecchia, Papal States.
Providence's Endeavour	Great Britain	The ship struck the pier and sank at Bridlington, Yorkshire. She was on a voyage from Great Yarmouth to Hull, Yorkshire.
Rebecca	Great Britain	The ship was wrecked on Wolf Rock, Cornwall. Her crew were rescued. She was on a voyage from Seville, Spain to London.
Rose	(Kingdom of Great Britain) Isle of Man	The ship struck a rock and sank at Europa Point, Gibraltar. She was on a voyage from Livorno, Grand Duchy of Tuscany to the Isle of Man.
St. Michael's Packet	Great Britain	The ship was lost in Málaga Bay. She was on a voyage from Bona, Algeria to Málaga, Spain.
St. Promand	France	The ship ran aground at Cette. She was on a voyage from Havre de Grâce to Cette.
Swift	Ireland	The ship was driven ashore at Dungarvan, County Antrim. She was on a voyage from Saint Petersburg, Russia to Waterford.
Unnamed	Spain	The ship was wrecked near Pineda de Mar with the loss of two lives.

== March ==
=== 4 March ===
List of shipwrecks: 4 March 1787
Ship	State	Description
Mary-Ann	Great Britain	The ship was wrecked at Ramsey, Isle of Man. She was on a voyage from Newry, County Antrim, Ireland to Liverpool, Lancashire.
Unnamed	France	The boat foundered off the mouth of the Garonne with the loss of 28 of the 36 people on board.

=== 6 March ===
List of shipwrecks: 6 March 1787
Ship	State	Description
Hannah	United States	The ship was lost 3 leagues (9 nautical miles (17 km) from L'Orient, France with some loss of life. She was on a voyage from Charleston, South Carolina to L'Orient.

=== 9 March ===
List of shipwrecks: 9 March 1787
Ship	State	Description
Johanna Florentina	Great Britain	The ship was driven ashore and wrecked at Stutton Gut, County Dublin, Ireland.
Nicholas Conolly	(Kingdom of Great Britain) Guernsey	The ship was lost at Guernsey with the loss of five of her crew. She was on a voyage from Lisbon, Portugal to Guernsey.
St Pedro Martyr	Spain	The ship was driven ashore and wrecked at Bayonne, France.

=== Unknown date ===
List of shipwrecks: Unknown date in March 1787
Ship	State	Description
Agnes	Great Britain	The ship was driven ashore on the coast of Scotland. She was on a voyage from Liverpool, Lancashire to Virginia, United States.
Alert	Great Britain	The ship ran aground on the Schevering Sand, in the North Sea off the Dutch coast and was wrecked. She was on a voyage from Livorno, Grand Duchy of Tuscany to London.
Ann	Ireland	The ship was wrecked near "Broom Hill" with the loss of all hands. She was on a voyage from Alicante, Spain to Cádiz, Spain and Newry, County Antrim.
Barbara	Great Britain	The ship was driven ashore near Cadiz and was wrecked.
Charlotte	Great Britain	The ship was driven ashore and wrecked at Fishguard, Pembrokeshire. She was on a voyage from Bristol, Gloucestershire to Grenada.
Darnel	Great Britain	The ship was wrecked near Wexford, Ireland. She was on a voyage from Liverpool to Africa.
Fidelity	Ireland	The ship was wrecked on the coast of Spain.
Friends	Ireland	The ship was wrecked at Notre-Dame-de-Monts, France with the loss of four of her crew. She was on a voyage from Cork to Bordeaux.
Hope	Denmark	The brig was driven ashore and wrecked at St. Lucar, Spain.
Hope	Great Britain	The ship was driven ashore and severely damaged at Pool, Dorset. She was on a voyage from London to Barcelona, Spain. Hope was later refloated and taken in to Pool.
Jane	Great Britain	The ship was wrecked on Heneagua.
John and Bella	Great Britain	The ship was driven ashore and severely damaged at Whitehaven, Cumberland. She was on a voyage from Liverpool to Virginia, United States.
Mars	Ireland	The ship was wrecked on the west coast of Ireland. She was on a voyage from New York, United States to Dublin.
Mercurius	Stettin	The ship was cut by ice and sank. She was on a voyage from London to Stettin.
Piltown	Great Britain	The ship was wrecked on the Scar Weather Sands, in the Irish Sea, with the loss of all but one or two of her crew. She was on a voyage from Waterford, Ireland to Bristol, Gloucestershire.
Rachael	Great Britain	The ship was wrecked with the loss of 23 lives.
Seven Stars	Great Britain	The ship was driven ashore and wrecked at Brighthelmstone, Sussex. She was on a voyage from Ostend, Dutch Republic to Nantes, France.
Speculation	Great Britain	The ship was wrecked on the North Bull, in the Irish Sea off County Dublin, Ireland.
St. Pedro	Spain	The ship was driven ashore 3 leagues (9 nautical miles (17 km) from Bilbao. She was on a voyage from London to Bilbao.
Susannah	Ireland	The ship foundered off Dumaney Bay, County Cork. She was on a voyage from New York, United States to Dublin.
Swallow Packet	Great Britain	The ship foundered in the Bay of Biscay. Her crew were rescued by a Spanish ship. She was on a voyage from A Coruña, Spain to Bristol, Gloucestershire.
Telemacque	Spain	The ship ran aground on the Folstrup Sand. She was on a voyage from Stettin to Cádiz.
Two Brothers	France	The ship was driven ashore and wrecked at Dunkerque. She was on a voyage from the Charente to Dunkerque.
Young Richard	Great Britain	The ship was driven ashore south of Figueira da Foz, Portugal.
Unnamed	France	The brigantine was wrecked on the coast of Morocco. She was on a voyage from Mogadore, Morocco to Marseille.
Unnamed	Great Britain	The Guineaman foundered in the English Channel.

== April ==
=== 20 April ===
List of shipwrecks: 20 April 1787
Ship	State	Description
Betsey	Great Britain	The ship was driven ashore near Danzig. She was on a voyage from Danzig to London.

=== 21 April ===
List of shipwrecks: 21 April 1787
Ship	State	Description
Thompson	Great Britain	The ship was lost whilst on a voyage from Jamaica to London.

=== 28 April ===
List of shipwrecks: 28 April 1787
Ship	State	Description
William	Great Britain	The ship was lost near Cape Breton Island, Nova Scotia, British America. She was on a voyage from London to Quebec, British America.

=== Unknown date ===
List of shipwrecks: Unknown date in April 1787
Ship	State	Description
Ceres	Great Britain	The ship capsized in the Atlantic Ocean (46°N 25°W) with the loss of a crew member. Her crew were rescued by Commerce (Great Britain). She was on a voyage from Newfoundland, British America to Dartmouth, Devon.
Chance	Great Britain	The ship was driven ashore at Vannes, France. She was on a voyage from a French port to Newfoundland.
Flora	Great Britain	The ship was driven ashore and wrecked at Dragør, Denmark. She was on a voyage from Hull, Yorkshire to Ventava, Duchy of Courland and Semigallia.
Helena Anna	Dutch Republic	The ship was driven ashore on Texel. She was on a voyage from London to Amsterdam.
Hope	Great Britain	The ship foundered in the Irish Sea off Bardsey Island, Pembrokeshire. She was on a voyage from Liverpool, Lancashire to Africa.
Irene	Great Britain	The ship was driven ashore and wrecked at Stornoway, Isle of Lewis. She was on a voyage from Liverpool to Memel, Prussia.
Sisters	Great Britain	The ship was lost at Dunkirk, France.
Success	Great Britain	The ship was driven ashore near "Wingo".

== May ==
=== 13 May ===
List of shipwrecks: 13 May 1787
Ship	State	Description
Sally	Great Britain	The ship foundered off Land's End, Cornwall. Her crew were rescued. She was on a voyage from Liverpool, Lancashire to Woodbridge, Suffolk.

=== 17 May ===
List of shipwrecks: 17 May 1787
Ship	State	Description
Sisters	Great Britain	African slave trade: The ship capsized in the Mona Passage. Of the 500 slaves and her crew, there were five survivors. She was on a voyage from Africa to Havana, Captaincy General of Cuba.

=== 20 May ===
List of shipwrecks: 20 May 1787
Ship	State	Description
Garland	Great Britain	The ship was wrecked on the Gold Coast, Africa.

=== 24 May ===
List of shipwrecks: 24 May 1787
Ship	State	Description
Hartwell	British East India Company	The full-rigged ship was wrecked at Boa Vista, Cape Verde Islands on her maiden voyage.

=== Unknown date ===
List of shipwrecks: Unknown date in May 1787
Ship	State	Description
Baltic Merchant	Great Britain	The ship ran aground and was wrecked on the Trindels, in the Kattegat. Her crew were rescued. She was on a voyage from Saint Petersburg, Russia to London.
Eliza	Great Britain	The ship was lost in the Bristol Channel. Her crew were rescued. She was on a voyage from Barbados to Liverpool, Lancashire.
Loyalty	Great Britain	The ship was driven ashore in the River Thames near the Mile House. She was on a voyage from Waterford, Ireland to London.
Jonge Jan	Hamburg	The ship was lost near Emden, Hanover. She was on a voyage from London to Hamburg.
Jonge Jan Oltman	Dutch Republic	The ship was driven ashore and wrecked on the Dutch coast. She was on a voyage from London to Rotterdam.
Martha	Great Britain	The ship was lost near Fladstrand, Norway with the loss of all but her Captain. She was on a voyage from Gothenburg to the Firth of Forth.
Peggy	Great Britain	The ship was lost on the Dutch coast. She was on a voyage from Falmouth, Cornwall to Hamburg.

== June ==
=== 1 June ===
List of shipwrecks: 1 June 1787
Ship	State	Description
Europe	Great Britain	African slave trade: The ship was destroyed by fire at the Island of Prince with some loss of life.

=== 2 June ===
List of shipwrecks: 2 June 1787
Ship	State	Description
Sisters	Great Britain	The ship struck a rock and foundered in the Atlantic Ocean off Land's End, Cornwall. Her crew were rescued by William and Mary (Great Britain). She was on a voyage from London to Cork, Ireland.

=== 6 June ===
List of shipwrecks: 6 June 1787
Ship	State	Description
Elizabeth	Great Britain	The ship was destroyed by fire at Alicante, Spain.

=== Unknown date ===
List of shipwrecks: Unknown date in June 1787
Ship	State	Description
Aldborough	Great Britain	The ship capsized at Dublin, Ireland. She was on a voyage from Dublin to Naples, Kingdom of Sicily.
Baltic Merchant	Great Britain	The ship foundered in the Kattegat. Her crew were rescued. She was on a voyage from Saint Petersburg, Russia to London.
Betsey	Great Britain	The ship ran aground on the Goodwin Sands, Kent. She was on a voyage from Dunkerque, France to London. She was refloated and taken in to Ramsgate, Kent on 5 June.
Friendship	Great Britain	The ship was driven ashore on "Osee", Russia. She was on a voyage from London to Saint Petersburg. She was refloated and completed her voyage.
Hope	Great Britain	The ship was lost near Croisic, France. She was on a voyage from Pool, Dorset to Croisic and Newfoundland, British America.
Mary Ann	Great Britain	The ship was destroyed by fire off Swinemünde, Swedish Pomerania. She was on a voyage from Stettin to London.
Nancy	Great Britain	The ship was lost in the Orkney Islands. She was on a voyage from "Christiana" to Liverpool, Lancashire.

== July ==
=== 6 July ===
List of shipwrecks: 6 July 1787
Ship	State	Description
Asia	Great Britain	The ship foundered whilst on a voyage from Stockholm, Sweden to Liverpool, Lancashire. Her crew were rescued.

=== Unknown date ===
List of shipwrecks: Unknown date in July 1787
Ship	State	Description
St. Joseph	Great Britain	The ship was lost at Ostend, Dutch Republic.
Three Sisters	Great Britain	The ship was driven ashore near Lowestoft, Suffolk. She was on a voyage from Memel, Prussia to Hull, Yorkshire.

== August ==
=== 2 August ===
List of shipwrecks: 2 August 1787
Ship	State	Description
Hannah	Ireland	The ship struck a rock north east of the Colorados and foundered. Her crew survived. She was on a voyage from Jamaica to Cork.

=== 4 August ===
List of shipwrecks: 16 August 1787
Ship	State	Description
Betsey	(Kingdom of France) Martinique	The schooner was driven ashore in a hurricane at Dominica.
John	Great Britain	The ship was driven ashore in a hurricane at Dominica.
John	(Kingdom of Great Britain) Dominica	The sloop was driven ashore in a hurricane at Dominica.
Lovely Nancy	(Kingdom of Great Britain) Dominica	The sloop was driven ashore in a hurricane at Dominica.
Provincial	(Kingdom of France) Martinique	The schooner was driven ashore in a hurricane at Dominica.
St. François	(Kingdom of France) Guadeloupe	The schooner was driven ashore in a hurricane at Dominica.

=== 16 August ===
List of shipwrecks: 16 August 1787
Ship	State	Description
Tobago	(Kingdom of Great Britain) Tobago	The sloop was wrecked in Englishman's Bay, Tobago.

=== 23 August ===
List of shipwrecks: 23 August 1787
Ship	State	Description
Britannia	Great Britain	The ship was driven ashore at Falsterbo, Sweden. She was on a voyage from Hamburg to Saint Petersburg, Russia.
King Fisher	(Kingdom of Great Britain) Dominica	The sloop was driven ashore in a hurricane at Dominica.

=== 24 August ===
List of shipwrecks: 24 August 1787
Ship	State	Description
Elizabeth	Great Britain	The ship was abandoned near Domesnes, Norway. Her crew were rescued. She was on a voyage from Memel, Prussia to Alloa, Clackmannanshire. Elizabeth was later towed in to "Hammersound", Norway by Alexander (Great Britain).

=== 30 August ===
List of shipwrecks: 30 August 1787
Ship	State	Description
Aurora	Great Britain	The brig was wrecked by a hurricane in the Loubiere River, Dominica.
Betsey	Great Britain	The shallop was driven ashore in a hurricane at Dominica.
Caton	Great Britain	The full-rigged ship was wrecked by a hurricane at the mouth of the Roseau River, Dominica.
Delight	Ireland	The ship was driven ashore in the Roseau River, Dominica.
Dolphin	Great Britain	The brig was wrecked by a hurricane at Point Mitchell, Dominica.
François	(Kingdom of France) Guadeloupe	The ship was driven ashore in a hurricane at Dominica.
John Sinclair	Great Britain	The ship was driven ashore in a hurricane at Dominica.
John Woodville	Great Britain	The ship was driven ashore in a hurricane at Dominica.
King Fisher	Great Britain	The ship was driven ashore in a hurricane at Dominica.
Lovely Nancy	Great Britain	The ship was driven ashore in a hurricane at Dominica.
Nancy	Great Britain	The sloop was driven ashore and wrecked by a hurricane at Dominica.
Liberty	(Kingdom of Great Britain) Montserrat	. The brig was wrecked by a hurricane in the Loubiere River, Dominica.
Provingal Baptiste	(Kingdom of France) Martinique	The ship was driven ashore in a hurricane at Dominica.
Swallow	Great Britain	The full-rigged ship was wrecked by a hurricane in Woodbridge Bay, Dominica.
Unnamed	France	The sloop was driven ashore in a hurricane at Dominica.

=== Unknown date ===
List of shipwrecks: Unknown date in August 1787
Ship	State	Description
Concord	Great Britain	The ship foundered in the North Sea. Her crew were rescued by Speedwell (Ireland). Concord was o a voyage from Ayre to Memel, PRussia.
Fortuna	Elbing	The ship was lost at Ostend, Dutch Republic.
Osterbotter	Sweden	The ship was driven ashore and wrecked near Öregrund. She was on a voyage from Wasa to London, Great Britain.
Perseverance	Great Britain	The ship was lost in the Swin. She was on a voyage from London to a Scottish port.
Sophia	France	The ship ran aground and was wrecked off Swinemünde, Swedish Pomerania. She was on a voyage from Bordeaux, France to Saint Petersburg, Russia.

== September ==
=== 2 September ===
List of shipwrecks: 2 September 1787
Ship	State	Description
Ann	Great Britain	The ship was driven ashore during a hurricane in British Honduras.
Antigua Planter	Great Britain	The brig was driven ashore during a hurricane in British Honduras.
Bellisarius	Great Britain	The full-rigged ship was driven ashore during a hurricane and wrecked at the mouth of the Belize River, British Honduras.
Bermuda	Great Britain	The full-rigged ship was driven ashore during a hurricane in British Honduras.
Betsey	Great Britain	The ship foundered off British Honduras during a hurricane with the loss of all hands.
Betsey	Great Britain	The sloop was driven ashore during a hurricane in British Honduras. She was later refloated.
Catherine	Great Britain	The full-rigged ship was driven ashore during a hurricane sank at the mouth of the Belize River. She was a total loss.
Craft	Great Britain	The ship foundered off British Honduras during a hurricane.
Dick	Great Britain	The ship foundered off British Honduras during a hurricane with the loss of all hands.
Ellen	Great Britain	The sloop was driven ashore and wrecked during a hurricane in British Honduras.
Ellon	Great Britain	The ship foundered off British Honduras during a hurricane.
Fortune	Great Britain	The schooner capsized and sank at the mouth of the Belize River during a hurricane with the loss of all hands.
Fortitude	Great Britain	The brig was driven ashore during a hurricane in British Honduras.
Friendship	Great Britain	The schooner capsized during a hurricane in British Honduras. She was subsequently righted.
Galloway	Great Britain	The ship foundered off British Honduras during a hurricane. She was refloated.
General Campbell	Great Britain	The brig was driven ashore in a hurricane at British Honduras. She was subsequently refloated.
George	Great Britain	The full-rigged ship was driven ashore and wrecked on the Magna Kas Reef off British Honduras during a hurricane with the loss of all but one of her crew.
Harriot	Great Britain	The ship foundered off British Honduras during a hurricane.
Honduras	Great Britain	The ship was driven ashore and wrecked on the coast of British Honduras during a hurricane with the loss of all hands.
Hope	Great Britain	The full-rigged ship was driven ashore on a reef during a hurricane and wrecked of St George's Kay, British Honduras.
Jamaica	Great Britain	The sloop was driven ashore and wrecked during a hurricane in British Honduras.
Jenny	Great Britain	The brig was driven ashore and severely damaged during a hurricane in British Honduras. She was later refloated.
Joan	Great Britain	The full-rigged ship was driven ashore duing a hurricane in British Honduras. She was a total loss.
John	Great Britain	The ship was driven ashore and wrecked during a hurricane in British Honduras.
Joseph	Great Britain	The ship foundered off British Honduras during a hurricane.
Little Ben	Great Britain	The sloop capsized and sank off British Honduras during a hurricane with the loss of all but one of her crew.
Mary	Great Britain	The schooner capsized and sank off British Honduras during a hurricane with the loss of all hands.
Mary and Betsey	Great Britain	The ship foundered off British Honduras during a hurricane with the loss of all hands.
Peggy	Great Britain	The ship foundered off British Honduras during a hurricane.
Polly	Great Britain	The ship foundered off British Honduras during a hurricane. She was refloated.
Sudden Death	Great Britain	The ship foundered off British Honduras during a hurricane.
Superbe	Great Britain	The ship foundered off British Honduras during a hurricane with the loss of all hands.
Susanna	Great Britain	The full-rigged ship was driven ashore and wrecked at the mouth of the Belize River during a hurricane.
Thomas	Great Britain	The full-rigged ship was driven onto a reef and wrecked off St. Georges Kay during a hurricane.
Fifteen unnamed vessels	Great Britain	Nine sloops and six schooners were wrecked at St. Georges Kay in a hurricane with much loss of life.

=== 8 September ===
List of shipwrecks: 8 September 1787
Ship	State	Description
Krym (Крым, 'Crimea')	Imperial Russian Navy	Russo-Turkish War (1787–1792): The Vosmoy-class frigate was lost in a storm in the area of Cape Kaliakra in the Black Sea, presumed foundered with the loss of all hands.

=== 11 September ===
List of shipwrecks: 11 September 1787
Ship	State	Description
Duke of York	Great Britain	The ship was lost at "New Years Harbour". Her crew were rescued.

=== 12 September ===
List of shipwrecks: 12 September 1787
Ship	State	Description
Neptune	Great Britain	The ship was wrecked off Great Yarmouth, Norfolk. She was on a voyage from Blyth, Northumberland to Lime, Dorset.

=== 13 September ===
List of shipwrecks: 13 September 1787
Ship	State	Description
Mariya Magdalina (Мария Магдалина, 'Mary Magdalene')	Imperial Russian Navy	Russo-Turkish War: The ship of the line was captured in the Bosporus Strait, having uncontrollably drifted there from Cape Kaliakra due to heavy damage taken in a five-day storm in the Black Sea.

=== 16 September ===
List of shipwrecks: 16 September 1787
Ship	State	Description
Vrouw Tiebeta	Bremen	The ship was wrecked near Boulogne, France. She was on a voyage from Liverpool, Lancashire, Great Britain to Bremen.

=== 19 September ===
List of shipwrecks: 19 September 1787
Ship	State	Description
Hector	Great Britain	The ship was wrecked at Plymouth Hoe, Devon. Her crew survived. She was on a voyage from Jamaica to London.

=== 21 September ===
List of shipwrecks: 21 September 1787
Ship	State	Description
Warren	Great Britain	The ship was driven ashore and wrecked at Youghall, County Cork, Ireland. She was on a voyage from Anguilla to Lancaster, Lancashire.

=== 27 September ===
List of shipwrecks: 27 September date 1787
Ship	State	Description
Four unnamed vessels	Flags unknown	The fishing vessels were lost in Douglas Bay, Isle of Man.
Three unnamed vessels	Flags unknown	The fishing vessels foundered off the Isle of Man with the loss of all hands.
25 unnamed vessels	Flags unknown	The fishing vessels were driven ashore at Douglas, Isle of Man.
Three unnamed vessels	Flags unknown	The fishing vessels were driven ashore between Douglas and Laxey, Isle of Man with the loss of all hands.
28 unnamed vessels	Flags unknown	The fishing vessels were driven ashore at Ramsey, Isle of Man. One life was lost.

=== Unknown date ===
List of shipwrecks: Unknown date in September 1787
Ship	State	Description
Britannia	Great Britain	The ship was driven ashore at Memel, Prussia.
Favourite Nancy	Ireland	The ship was driven ashore and wrecked near Dublin. She was on a voyage from Dublin to Bordeaux, France.
Fortitude	Great Britain	The ship was wrecked on Bornholm, Denmark with the loss of all but one of her crew. She was on a voyage from "Wyburg" to King's Lynn, Norfolk.
Helena Maria	Great Britain	The ship was lost near "Warbury", Sweden. She was on a voyage from Chatham, Kent, Great Britain to Gamla Carleby.
Henny	Great Britain	The ship ran aground in the River Ribble and was severely damaged. She was on a voyage from Barbados to Lancaster, Lancashire.
Hope	Great Britain	The ship departed from Trondheim, Norway for Naples, Kingdom of Sicily. No further trace, presumed foundered with the loss of all hands.
Joseph	Ireland	The ship was lost at Fayal, Azores. She was on a voyage from New York, United States to Barbados and Dublin.
Molniya (Молния, 'Lightning')	Imperial Russian Navy	The transport ship was wrecked in the Moonsund. She was on a voyage from Riga to Kronstadt.
Thames	Great Britain	The ship was driven ashoreat Newry, County Antrim, Ireland. She was on a voyage from London to Newry. Thames was later refloated.
Unnamed	Ireland	The West Indiaman was wrecked in the Saltee Islands, County Wexford. Her crew survived.

== October ==
=== 3 October ===
List of shipwrecks: 3 October 1787
Ship	State	Description
Neptunus	Denmark	The ship was wrecked on the Dutch coast. She was on a voyage from Copenhagen to the West Indies.

=== 4 October ===
List of shipwrecks: 4 October 1787
Ship	State	Description
St Jean Baptiste	Spain	The ship was driven ashore in the Øresund. She was on a voyage from Saint Petersburg, Russia to Bilbao. She was later refloated and taken in to Copenhagen, Denmark for repairs.

=== 18 October ===
List of shipwrecks: 18 October 1787
Ship	State	Description
Slon (Слон, 'Elephant')	Imperial Russian Navy	The galiot was driven ashore and wrecked in the Black Sea. She was on a voyage from Kherson to Sevastopol.

=== 20 October ===
List of shipwrecks: 21 October 1787
Ship	State	Description
Unnamed	French Navy	The frigate foundered off Gibraltar.

=== 21 October ===
List of shipwrecks: 21 October 1787
Ship	State	Description
Unnamed	Great Britain	The packet boat foundered in the English Channel off Brighthelmstone, Sussex with the loss of all on board.

=== 22 October ===
List of shipwrecks: 22 October 1787
Ship	State	Description
Two Sisters	Great Britain	The brig was driven ashore and wrecked at Brighthelmstone, Sussex with some loss of life.

=== 26 October ===
List of shipwrecks: 22 October 1787
Ship	State	Description
Unnamed	Flag unknown	The brig was driven ashore at Westgate-on-Sea, Kent, Great Britain.

=== Unknown date ===
List of shipwrecks: Unknown date in October 1787
Ship	State	Description
Ellen	Great Britain	The ship was wrecked on the Burbo Bank, in Liverpool Bay. She was on a voyage from Jamaica to Liverpool, Lancashire.
Euhorn	Denmark	The ship sprang a leak in the River Thames and was beached at Northfleet, Kent, Great Britain. She was on a voyage from London to Elsinore.
Freden	Sweden	The ship ran aground on the Goodwin Sands, Kent and was wrecked. Her crew were rescued. She was on a voyage from Gothenburg to Newry, County Antrim, Ireland.
Industry	Ireland	The ship was driven ashore near Holyhead, Anglesey, Great Britain. She was on a voyage from Bordeaux, France to Drogheda, County Louth.
Kitty & Mary	Great Britain	The ship was wrecked on the Welsh coast. She was on a voyage from Newry to Liverpool.
Lowestoft	Great Britain	The ship foundered in the Baltic Sea whilst on a voyage from London to Saint Petersburg, Russia.
Nossa Senhora Da Bonviance	Portugal	The ship was lost in the Vlie. She was on a voyage from Saint Petersburg to Porto.
Notre Dame Begone	Spain	The ship was driven ashore near Bilbao. She was on a voyage from Bilbao to London.
Sally	Great Britain	The ship ran aground at Tingmouth, Devon and was severely damaged. She was on a voyage from Liverpool to Tingmouth.
Unity	Great Britain	The ship was driven ashore at Hoylake, Cheshire. She was on a voyage from Arkhangelsk, Russia to Liverpool. She was later refloated and taken in to Liverpool.
Unnamed	Sweden	The ship was wrecked on the Longsand, in the North Sea off the coast of Essex, Great Britain.

== November ==
=== 2 November ===
List of shipwrecks: 2 November 1787
Ship	State	Description
Friendship	Great Britain	The ship was lost in the Bengal River, India with some loss of life.

=== 6 November ===
List of shipwrecks: 6 November 1787
Ship	State	Description
Asia	Great Britain	The ship foundered whilst on a voyage from Stockholm, Sweden to Liverpool, Lancashire. Her crew were rescued.
Rebecca	Great Britain	The ship foundered in the Irish Sea off Whitehaven, Cumberland.

=== 8 November ===
List of shipwrecks: 8 November 1787
Ship	State	Description
Constant Trader	Great Britain	The ship was lost in St Brides Bay. She was on a voyage from Kinsale, County Cork, Ireland to Bristol, Gloucestershire.

=== 9 November ===
List of shipwrecks: 9 November 1787
Ship	State	Description
Unnamed	Portugal	The ship was driven ashore between Rottingdean and Saltdean, Sussex, Great Britain with the loss of a crew member.

=== 14 November ===
List of shipwrecks: 14 November 1787
Ship	State	Description
Adventure	Great Britain	The ship foundered in the Bristol Channel.
Betsey	Great Britain	The ship ran aground off Emden, Hanover and was wrecked with the loss of all but one of her crew. She was on a voyage from King's Lynn, Norfolk to Rotterdam, Dutch Republic.

=== 18 November ===
List of shipwrecks: 18 November 1787
Ship	State	Description
Parr	Great Britain	The ship was lost whilst on a voyage from "Maramaschie" to Halifax, Nova Scotia, British America.

=== Unknown date ===
List of shipwrecks: Unknown date in November 1787
Ship	State	Description
Adventure	Great Britain	The ship foundered in the English Channel off Boulogne, France with the loss of all hands.
Alfred	Great Britain	The ship was wrecked on the Sandhammer Reef, in the Baltic Sea with the loss of four of her crew.
Ann & Elizabeth	Great Britain	The ship was lost near Margate, Kent. She was on a voyage from Plymouth, Devon to London.
Bilboa Packet	Great Britain	The ship was driven ashore and wrecked at Deal, Kent. She was on a voyage from London to Bilbao, Spain.
Blessing	Great Britain	The ship was driven ashore and damaged in the River Thames at Woolwich, Kent. She was on a voyage from London to South Shields, County Durham.
Bourdeaux Trader	France	The ship was driven ashore in the Garonne. She was on a voyage from Bristol, Gloucestershire to Bordeaux. Bourdeaux Trader was later refloated and taken in to Bordeaux.
Christiana Frederick	(Denmark) Norway	The ship was lost on the Kentish Knock with the loss of most of her crew. She was on a voyage from Bergen to Livorno, Grand Duchy of Tuscany.
Concord	Great Britain	The ship was lost in the Gulf of Finland. Her crew were rescued.
Daniel	Great Britain	The ship was lost near Margate. She was on a voyage from London to Bristol.
Eliza	Great Britain	The ship was lost at Aveiro, Portugal. She was on a voyage from Newfoundland, British America to Aveiro.
Elizabeth	Great Britain	The ship was wrecked at Ramsgate, Kent. She was on a voyage from Poole, Dorset to Newcastle upon Tyne, Northumberland.
Forrester	Great Britain	The ship sprang a leak and put into Ramsgate, Kent, where she sank. She was on a voyage from Limmington, Hampshire to London.
Friendship	Great Britain	The ship was lost off Holyhead, Anglesey. She was on a voyage from Liverpool, Lancashire to London.
Garland	Great Britain	The ship was lost near Sandown Castle, Kent. She was on a voyage from London to Seville, Spain.
Good Expectations	Bremen	The ship was lost near Great Yarmouth, Norfolk, Great Britain. She was on a voyage from Bremen to Bordeaux or Nantes, France.
Industry	Great Britain	The ship foundered in the North Sea off Great Yarmouth. She was on a voyage from Leith, Lothian to Campveer, Dutch Republic.
Janet	Great Britain	The ship was wrecked near Wicklow, Ireland.
Lady Francis	Great Britain	The ship was driven ashore on the coast of Caithness.
Laurel	Great Britain	The ship was driven ashore near Whitby, Yorkshire. She was later refloated.
Manchester	Great Britain	The ship was driven ashore and severely damaged at Douglas, Isle of Man. She was on a voyage from Liverpool to Livorno. Manchester was later refloated.
Margaret and Ann	Great Britain	The ship was driven ashore near Whitby. She was on a voyage from Leith to Campveer. Margaret and Ann was later refloated.
Margret	Great Britain	The ship was driven ashore near Dragør, Denmark. She was on a voyage from Riga, Russia to Leith.
Maria Charlotta	(Denmark) Norway	The ship was wrecked on the Norwegian coast. She was on a voyage from London to Norrköping.
Mary	Great Britain	The ship ran aground on the Sandholms, in the Baltic Sea.
Molly	Great Britain	The ship was lost near St. David's Head, Pembrokeshire. She was on a voyage from Bristol to Liverpool.
Nelly	Great Britain	The ship was wrecked at "Wigan". She was on a voyage from Leith to Memel, Prussia.
Phœnix	Great Britain	The ship was driven ashore near Boulogne with the loss of six of her crew. She was on a voyage from the Deva, Spain to London.
Prince William Henry Paquet	Great Britain	The ship was lost near Boulogne. She was on a voyage from Southampton, Hampshire to Dieppe, France.
Recovery	Great Britain	The ship was lost near Rosinstown, County Wexford, Ireland with the loss of six of her crew. she was on a voyage from London to Dublin.
Richard	Great Britain	The ship was driven ashore on the Isle of Jura. She was later refloated.
Rose	Great Britain	The ship foundered in Pegwell Bay. She was on a voyage from Newcastle upon Tyne to Sandwich, Kent.
Sally	Great Britain	The ship was lost near Leigh-on-Sea, Essex. Her crew were rescued. She was on a voyage from London to Gibraltar.
Senegalia	Great Britain	The ship was wrecked near Boulogne with the loss of all hands. She was on a voyage from Livorno, Grand Duchy of Tuscany to London.
Tendenstrickt	Denmark	The ship was wrecked on the Bree Bank with the loss of all but two of her crew. She was on a voyage from Copenhagen to Santa Cruz.
Thomas and Richard	Great Britain	The ship was wrecked at Memel, Prussia with the loss of five of her crew.
Unnamed	Great Britain	The brig ran aground on the Sandholms.
unnamed	Great Britain	The ship, a brig or snow, was driven ashore on Skagen, Denmark.

== December ==
=== 2 December ===
List of shipwrecks: 2 December 1787
Ship	State	Description
Mary Ann	Great Britain	The ship was lost at Grenada. She was on a voyage from Virginia, United States to Grenada.

=== 4 December ===
List of shipwrecks: 8 December 1787
Ship	State	Description
Unnamed	Dutch Republic	The hoy was wrecked between the Birling Gap and Eastbourne, Sussex, Great Britain. Her crew were rescued.

=== 8 December ===
List of shipwrecks: 8 December 1787
Ship	State	Description
Mars	British East India Company	The East Indiaman was driven ashore and wrecked at Margate, Kent. She was on a voyage from China to London.

=== 9 December ===
List of shipwrecks: 9 December 1787
Ship	State	Description
Bellona	Great Britain	The ship was in collision with Tyne (Great Britain) and was abandoned by her crew, who were rescued by Tyne, which was severely damaged. Bellona was on a voyage from Memel, Prussia to London. Union (Great Britain) subsequently towed her in to Scarborough, Yorkshire in a wrecked condition.

=== 11 December ===
List of shipwrecks: 11 December 1787
Ship	State	Description
Friends Goodwill	Ireland	The ship departed from Cork for Havre de Grâce, France. No further trace, presumed foundered with the loss of all hands.

=== 13 December ===
List of shipwrecks: 13 December 1787
Ship	State	Description
Unnamed	(flag) Dutch Republic	The ship foundered in Salcombe Bay with the loss of all hands.

=== 16 December ===
List of shipwrecks: 16 December 1787
Ship	State	Description
Nancy	Great Britain	The ship departed from Virginia, United States for Lisbon, Portugal. No further trace, presumed foundered in the Atlantic Ocean with the loss of all hands.

=== 17 December ===
List of shipwrecks: 17 December 1787
Ship	State	Description
Ann	Great Britain	The ship was driven ashore in Dundalk Bay. She was on a voyage from Glasgow, Renfrewshire to Dublin
Mary	Ireland	The ship was driven ashore in Dundalk Bay. She was on a voyage from Málaga, Spain to Dublin.

=== 19 December ===
List of shipwrecks: 19 December 1787
Ship	State	Description
Gideon	Ireland	The ship was driven ashore and wrecked on Madeira.
Harmony	Sweden	The ship was driven ashore and wrecked on Madeira.
Maria	United States	The ship was driven ashore on Madeira.
Nossa Senhora Conceicao Santa Rita	Portugal	The ship was driven ashore and wrecked on Madeira.
Sally	Ireland	The ship was driven ashore and wrecked on Madeira.

=== 22 December ===
List of shipwrecks: 22 December 1787
Ship	State	Description
Anna	Dutch Republic	The ship was wrecked on the north coast of Guernsey, Channel Islands with the loss of all hands.
Hope	Ireland	The brigantine was driven ashore near Youghal, County Cork. She was on a voyage from Waterford to London, Great Britain.

=== 23 December ===
List of shipwrecks: 23 December 1787
Ship	State	Description
Plymouth	Great Britain	The brig was wrecked at St. Ives, Cornwall. Her crew were rescued. She was on a voyage from Bristol, Gloucestershire to Plymouth, Devon.

=== 24 December ===
List of shipwrecks: 24 December 1787
Ship	State	Description
Plymouth	Great Britain	The brig was wrecked at St. Ives, Cornwall. Her crew were rescued.

=== 28 December ===
List of shipwrecks: 28 December 1787
Ship	State	Description
Eliza	Great Britain	The ship foundered in the Atlantic Ocean (42°00′N 15°00′W). Her crew were rescued by William and Hannah (Great Britain). Eliza was on a voyage from Valencia, Spain to London.

=== Unknown date ===
List of shipwrecks: Unknown date in December 1787
Ship	State	Description
Amphion	Great Britain	The ship was wrecked at Boulogne, Pas-de-Calais, France whilst on a voyage from Stockholm, Sweden to Havre de Grace, Seine-Maritime, France.
Flora	Great Britain	The ship was driven ashore near Cádiz, Spain.
Friendship	Great Britain	The ship ran aground near Cronstadt, Russia.
Good-Intent	Great Britain	The ship was lost on the coast of Spain. She was on a voyage from London to Antigua and Jamaica.
Little Betsey	Great Britain	The ship was driven ashore and wrecked in the River Thames at Rotherhithe, Kent. She was on a voyage from Málaga, Spain to London.
Marian	Great Britain	The ship was lost near Figueira da Foz, Portugal. She was on a voyage from Saint Petersburg, Russia to Messina, Sicily.
Mary	Ireland	The ship foundered in the Atlantic Ocean. Her crew were rescued. She was on a voyage from St. Ubes, Portugal to Cork.
Mary Ann	Great Britain	The ship foundered in the North Sea off Whitby, Yorkshire. Her crew were rescued. She was on a voyage from Newcastle upon Tyne, Northumberland to Newhaven, Sussex.
Nancy	Great Britain	The ship was wrecked on the coast of Ireland with the loss of six of her crew. She was on a voyage from Londonderry, Ireland to Liverpool, Lancashire.
Peace & Plenty	Great Britain	The ship foundered in the Irish Sea off Wicklow, Ireland. She was on a voyage from Liverpool, Lancashire to Boston.
Rialto	Great Britain	The ship ran aground on the Goodwin Sands, Kent. She was on a voyage from Great Yarmouth, Norfolk to Livorno, Grand Duchy of Tuscany.
Venus	Great Britain	The ship was run down and sunk in the Bay of Biscay by a French brig. Her crew were rescued.

== Unknown date ==
List of shipwrecks: Unknown date in 1787
Ship	State	Description
Active	Great Britain	The ship was lost at the mouth of the Gabon River, Africa. Her crew were rescued. She was on a voyage from Africa to London.
Active	Great Britain	The ship foundered in the Atlantic Ocean while on a voyage from South Carolina, United States to Bristol, Gloucestershire. Her crew were rescued.
Albion	Great Britain	The ship was driven ashore and wrecked in the Gulf of Florida. She was on a voyage from Jamaica to London.
Alfred Stopart	Great Britain	The ship was driven ashore and wrecked in the Gulf of Florida. She was on a voyage from Jamaica to London.
Avanture	France	The ship was lost due to an insurrection. She was on a voyage from Bordeaux to Africa and the West Indies.
Betsey	Ireland	The ship was lost whilst on a voyage from Baffin Bay to Newry, County Antrim.
Betsey	Great Britain	The ship was lost on the coast of Nova Scotia, British America/ Her crew were rescued. She was on a voyage from the Clyde to Halifax, Nova Scotia.
Betsey	Great Britain	The whaler was sunk by ice off the coast of Greenland.
Betsey	Ireland	The ship was lost 10 nautical miles (19 km) south of Egg Harbour, New Jersey, United States. She was on a voyage from Dublin to New York, United States.
Carnatic	British East India Company	The East Indiaman ran aground at Falta, India and was wrecked. She was on a voyage from London the Tranquebar and Bengal, India.
Cato	Great Britain	The ship was lost whilst on a voyage from New York to Jamaica.
Charlotte	Great Britain	The ship was driven ashore at New Providence, New Jersey, United States.
Dutchess of Argyle	Great Britain	The ship sprang a leak and was beached on Cumberland Island, Georgia, United States. She was on a voyage from Jamaica to Philadelphia, Pennsylvania, United States.
Eagle	Great Britain	The ship foundered whilst on a voyage from British Honduras to Liverpool, She had been ashore in the Gulf of Mexico.
Enterprize	Great Britain	The ship was lost at Jamaica.
Experiment	Ireland	The ship was lost on the coast of Nova Scotia, British America. She was on a voyage from Cork to Halifax.
Favourite	Great Britain	The whaler was sunk by ice off the coast of Greenland.
Fox	Great Britain	The ship was severely damaged by fire at "Tracadegash".
Generous Friends	Great Britain	The whaler was sunk by ice off the coast of Greenland.
Hastings	British East India Company	The East Indiaman was lost in the China Seas. She was on a voyage from China to Bengal, India.
Holcomb	Great Britain	The whaler was sunk by ice off the coast of Greenland.
Hope	Great Britain	The ship was wrecked at Charleston, South Carolina, United States. She was on a voyage from Charleston to Hamburg.
Hope	Great Britain	The ship was lost near "Traverse". Her crew were rescued.
James	Great Britain	The ship sprang a leak and was beached on Pidgeon Island. She was on a voyage from Jamaica to Liverpool.
Jenny	Ireland	The ship was abandoned in the Atlantic Ocean. Her crew were rescued by Everley (Great Britain). Jenny was on a voyage from North Carolina, United States to Cork.
Lady Hill	Great Britain	The ship was lost on the north east coast of Jamaica. She was on a voyage from Philadelphia, Pennsylvania, United States to Jamaica.
Lady Hughes	Great Britain	The ship was lost at Grenada. Her crew were rescued.
Lord Shelburne	Great Britain	The transport ship foundered in the Grand Banks of Newfoundland. All on board were rescued by Catharine (Great Britain).
Marianne	Great Britain	The ship was wrecked on a reef off Port Royal, Jamaica. She was on a voyage from Jamaica to Saint Domingo.
Mary	Great Britain	The ship was lost whilst on a voyage from Africa to the West Indies and back.
Mary	Great Britain	Captain Nelles's whaler was sunk by ice off the coast of Greenland.
Mary	Great Britain	Captain Carpenter's whaler was sunk by ice off the coast of Greenland.
Mercury	Great Britain	The ship was wrecked on Heneaga. She was on a voyage from Charleston to Jamaica.
Minerva	Great Britain	The ship foundered in the Atlantic Ocean whilst on a voyage from North Carolina to Dublin. Her crew were rescued.
Neckar	British East India Company	The East Indiaman was lost in the China Seas. She was on a voyage from China to Bengal.
Noble Bounty	Great Britain	The ship was wrecked on a reef off Cape Florida, New Spain. She was on a voyage from Jamaica to London.
Nonsuch	Great Britain	The ship was lost at the Virginia Capes, United States. Her crew were rescued. She was on a voyage from London to Virginia.
Peggy	Great Britain	The ship was lost whilst on a voyage from London to British Honduras.
Ranger	Great Britain	The ship was wrecked on the Colorados with the loss of five of her crew. She was on a voyage from Jamaica to Bermuda.
Rose	Great Britain	The ship was lost whilst on a voyage from the Leeward Islands to Quebec. Her crew were rescued.
Success	Great Britain	The whaler was sunk in the Davis Straits.
Swift	Great Britain	The ship foundered off Bermuda. Her crew were rescued. She was on a voyage from Grenada to Newfoundland, British America.
Thames	Great Britain	The ship was lost in the Gulf of Venice. Her crew were rescued. She was on a voyage from London to Trieste, Republic of Venice.
Three Friends	Great Britain	The ship was lost near Charleston. She was on a voyage from Tobago to Charleston.
Tigris	Ireland	The ship struck a rock and sank whilst on a voyage from Quebec City to Montreal.
Turnchapell	Great Britain	The ship was lost on a voyage from Newfoundland to Halifax.
Two Sisters	Great Britain	The ship foundered with the loss of all but five of her crew. She was on a voyage from the Bay of Honduras to Jamaica.
White	Great Britain	The ship was lost off Cape Breton Island, Nova Scotia. She was on a voyage from Cowes, Isle of Wight to Quebec, British America.
