= Enterprize (1790 ship) =

British slave ship (1790–1803)

History

Great Britain
- Name: Enterprize
- Owner: Thomas Leyland & Thomas Molyneux
- Builder: Liverpool
- Launched: 1790
- Fate: Wrecked 1803

General characteristics
- Tons burthen: 212, or 229 (bm)
- Complement: 1794:20; 1795:20; 1801:20
- Armament: 1794:16 × 4-pounder guns; 1795:10 × 4-pounder guns; 1801:12 × 4&6-pounder guns

Enterprize was launched in 1790, at Liverpool. Between 1791 and 1802, she made eight complete voyages in the triangular trade in enslaved people as a Liverpool-based slave ship. She was wrecked in 1803, while returning to Liverpool from her ninth enslaving voyages. Her wreck was the target of salvage efforts in the early 19th century; the wreck was rediscovered by recreational divers in the 1990s.

== Career ==
Thomas Leyland was a Liverpool shipowner and businessman who owned several vessels that engaged in enslaving. One of these vessels, named Enterprize, had wrecked in 1787. Leyland joined with another investor and together they commissioned a new enslaving ship that they also named Enterprize, which was completed in 1790, and is the subject of this article. (Note: For this ship, his letter book has been preserved. The letters were sent to his agents and customers and are now located at the Liverpool Record Office.)

Enterprize first appeared in Lloyd's Register (LR) in 1791.

Year	Master	Owner	Trade	Source
1791	C.Wilson; R.Leatham	T.Leyland	Liverpool–Africa	LR

1st voyage transporting enslaved people (1791–1792): Roger Leathom sailed from Liverpool on 7 May 1791. Enterprize acquired captives at Bonny, New Calabar, and Calabar. She arrived at Grenada on 27 January 1792, with 319 captives. She sailed for Liverpool on 15 February, and arrived there on 19 March. She had left Liverpool with 24 crew members and three died on the voyage.

2nd voyage transporting enslaved people (1792–1793): Captain Leathom sailed from Liverpool on 28 May 1792. Enterprize started acquiring captives on 14 July, first at New Calabar and then at Calabar. She sailed from Africa on 30 October, and arrived first at St Vincent and then at Grenada on 9 December. She left Grenada on 3 January 1793, and arrived back at Liverpool on 1 February. She had left Liverpool with 30 crew members and she suffered five crew deaths on the voyage.

Year	Master	Owner	Trade	Source
1794	R.Leathom; W.Young	Leyland	Liverpool–Africa	LR

3rd voyage transporting enslaved people (1794–1795): War with France had broken out by the time Enterprize left on her next slave trading voyage. Captain William Young acquired a letter of marque on 10 March 1794. Enterprize sailed from Liverpool on 5 May, and began acquiring captives in Africa on 10 August, at the Congo River. She left Africa on 18 October, and arrived at Kingston, Jamaica on 25 November, with 360 captives. She landed 356. She sailed from Kingston on 5 February 1795, and arrived back at Liverpool on 29 March. She had left Liverpool with 33 crew members and she suffered seven crew deaths on the voyage.

Year	Master	Owner	Trade	Source & notes
1796	J.Heron	Leyland	Liverpool–Africa	LR; repairs 1794 & 1796

4th voyage transporting enslaved people (1795–1796): Captain John Heron acquired a letter of marque on 10 August 1795. Enterprize sailed from Liverpool on 4 September 1795. In 1795, 79 vessels sailed from English ports, bound for the trade in enslaved people; 59 of these vessels sailed from Liverpool.

Heron commenced acquiring captives at the Congo River on 14 December. She sailed from Africa on 21 February 1796, and arrived at Kingston on 9 April, with 356 captives. She arrived back at Liverpool on 6 September. She had left Liverpool with 35 crew members and she suffered nine crew deaths on her voyage.

5th voyage transporting enslaved people (1796–1797): Captain Heron sailed from Liverpool on 9 November 1796, bound for West Africa. In 1796, 103 vessels sailed from English ports, bound for the trade in enslaved people; 94 of these vessels sailed from Liverpool.

Heron started acquiring captives on 14 March 1797. She embarked 363 captives and sailed from Africa on 13 May. She stopped at Barbados and arrived at Kingston on 1 July, with 362 slaves. She sailed from Kingston on 20 October, and arrived back at Liverpool on 12 December. She had sailed from Liverpool with 40 crew members and had suffered no crew deaths on her voyage.

6th voyage transporting enslaved people (1798–1799): Captain Heron sailed from Liverpool on 10 April 1798, bound for West Africa. In 1798, 160 vessels sailed from English ports, bound for the trade in enslaved people; 149 of these vessels sailed from Liverpool.

Enterprize stopped at Barbados and arrived at St Croix on 10 December with 347 captives. She arrived back at Liverpool on 26 February 1799. She had left Liverpool with 43 crew members and had suffered four crew deaths on her voyage.

At the time Saint Croix was a Danish colony. In 1792, the Danish government passed a law that would outlaw Danish participation in the trans-Atlantic enslaving trade, from early 1803 on. This led the government in the Danish West Indies to encourage the importation of captives prior to the ban taking effect. One measure that it took was to open the trade to foreign vessels. Records for the period 1796 to 1799, show that 24 British enslaving ships, most of them from Liverpool, arrived at St Croix and imported 6,781 captives.

7th voyage transporting enslaved people (1799–1800): Captain Heron sailed from Liverpool on 13 May 1799. In 1799, 79 vessels sailed from English ports, bound for the trade in enslaved people; 59 of these vessels sailed from Liverpool.

Enterprize arrived at Kingston on 28 January 1800, with 304 captives. She sailed from Kingston on 28 March and arrived back at Liverpool on 7 June. She had left Liverpool with 42 crew members and she suffered six crew deaths on her voyage.

8th voyage transporting enslaved people (1801–1802): Captain Caesar Lawson acquired a letter of marque on 28 May 1801. He sailed from Liverpool on 21 June. In 1801, 147 vessels sailed from English ports, bound for the trade in enslaved people; 122 of these vessels sailed from Liverpool.

Enterprize arrived at Kingston on 3 December. She sailed from Kingston 2 February 1802, and arrived back at Liverpool on 16 March. She had left Liverpool with 38 crew members and she suffered nine crew deaths on her voyage. She returned to Liverpool with a cargo of cotton coffee, sugar, and some wine.

9th voyage transporting enslaved people (1802): Captain Thomas W. Egerton sailed from Liverpool on 21 May 1802. In 1802, 155 vessels sailed from English ports, bound for the trade in enslaved people; 122 of these vessels sailed from Liverpool.

Enterprize arrived at Havana on 28 November 1811, with 225 captives. She sailed from Havana on 21 December 1802.

== Loss ==
Lloyd's List reported in February 1803, that Enterprize, Egerton, master, sailing from Havana to Liverpool, had been lost at Donaghadee. Egerton and 10 men had been lost. In her voyage, Enterprize sailed from Liverpool on 21 May 1802, with 28 crew members and she suffered 13 crew deaths on her voyage.

== Salvage efforts ==
Soon after Enterprize was shipwrecked, salvage operations began and tongs were constructed to pluck foreign currency, including dollars, out of the wreck from above the water. A second salvage operation was launched in 1829, on this occasion diving bells were used and purportedly raised $50,000. The next attempt at salvage took place in 1833 and 1834, by two people known as the Deane brothers. The Deanes were successful in raising items off the seabed; they made themselves wealthy and kept records of what they salvaged. They found, amongst other items, a silver watch, two silver dollars, coins, and copper bars. Enterprize was then forgotten and was not re-discovered until the late 1990s, when two recreational divers came across the wreck. Enterprize is one of a small number of located slave shipwrecks.
