= Robert (ship) =

Several ships have been named Robert.

- Robert (1793 ship) was a 16-gun French privateer corvette launched in 1793 at Nantes. The British captured her in 1793 and named her HMS Espion. The French recaptured her in 1794 and took her into service as Espion. The British recaptured her in 1795, but there being another Espion in service by then, the British renamed their capture HMS Spy. She served under that name until the Navy sold her in 1801. She then became a slave ship, whaling ship, and privateer again. The French captured her in mid-1805 and sent her into Guadeloupe.
- Robert (1800 ship) was launched at Newcastle upon Tyne in 1800 as a West Indiaman. In 1804 she may have served as an armed defense ship before reverting to the West Indies trade. She was last listed in 1825.
- Robert (1805 ship) was built in Brazil in 1797 (probably under another name) and first appeared in Lloyd's Register in 1805. She made two slave trading voyages but a French privateer captured her in 1808 on her second voyage.
- Robert (1814 ship) was an American brig that the British captured in 1814. Until 1822 the brig was a West Indiaman based in Liverpool and sailing to the Bahamas or Havana. In 1822 she was totally lost while seal hunting in the South Shetland Islands.
