= Louisa (1798 ship) =

British slave ship (1798–1804)

History

Great Britain
- Name: Louisa
- Launched: 1794, France
- Acquired: 1798, by purchase of a prize
- Fate: Wrecked 1804

General characteristics
- Tons burthen: 328, or 331 (bm)
- Complement: 1798: 25; 1801: 20; 1803: 20
- Armament: 1798: 12 × 9-pounder guns; 1801: 10 × 9-pounder guns; 1803: 12 × 9-pounder guns

Louisa was launched in France in 1794, probably under another name. She was taken in prize and between 1798 and 1804 she made five complete voyages as a slave ship in the triangular trade in enslaved people. Her fourth voyage gave rise to an influential, and exaggerated, estimate of the profitability of trading in enslaved people. She was lost in 1804 on the coast of Africa on her sixth voyage.

== Career ==
Louisa first appeared in Lloyd's Register (LR), in 1798.

Year	Master	Owner	Trade	Source
1798	W.Brown	T.Leyland	Liverpool–Africa	LR

1st voyage transporting enslaved people (1798–1799): Captain William Brown acquired a letter of marque on 3 March 1798. He sailed from Liverpool on 10 April. In 1798, 160 vessels sailed from English ports, bound for the trade in enslaved people; 149 of these vessels sailed from Liverpool.

Louisa acquired captives at Malembo and arrived at Kingston on 13 December with 455. Louisa sailed from Kingston on 12 February 1799 and arrived back at Liverpool on 12 April. She had left Liverpool with 57 crew members and had suffered 10 crew deaths on her voyage.

2nd voyage transporting enslaved people (1799–1800): Captain Brown sailed from Liverpool on 17 July 1799. In 1799, 156 vessels sailed from English ports, bound for the trade in enslaved people; 134 of these vessels sailed from Liverpool.

Brown acquired captives at Bonny and arrived at Kingston on 26 February 1800 with 453 captives. Louisa sailed from Kingston on 27 May and arrived back at Liverpool on 15 July. She had left with 47 crew members and had suffered 11 crew deaths on her voyage.

Year	Master	Owner	Trade	Source
1801	W.Brown; G.Bernard	T.Layland	Liverpool–Africa	LR

3rd voyage transporting enslaved people (1801–1802): Captain George Bernard acquired a letter of marque on 1 May 1801. He sailed from Liverpool on 21 May. He sailed from Liverpool on 10 April. In 1801, 147 vessels sailed from English ports, bound for the trade in enslaved people; 122 of these vessels sailed from Liverpool.

On 29 May 1801 Louisa, Bernard, master, was all well at 48°30′N 7°36′W. She was in company with Lottery, Whittle, master, and Princess Amelia, Livingston, master. Bernard acquired captives at Bonny and arrived at Jamaica on 5 November 1801. Louisa sailed from Jamaica on 15 December and arrived back at Liverpool on 6 February 1802. She had left Liverpool with 50 crew members and she had suffered four crew deaths on her voyage.

4th voyage transporting enslaved people (1802–1803): Captain Caesar Lawson sailed from Liverpool on 21 May 1802. He sailed during the Peace of Amiens and so did not acquire a letter of marque. In 1802, 155 vessels sailed from English ports, bound for the trade in enslaved people; 122 of these vessels sailed from Liverpool.

Lawson acquired captives at Bonny and arrived at Montego Bay on 17 November with 326 captives who he landed there. Louisa sailed from Jamaica on 25 December and arrived back at Liverpool on 12 February 1803. She had left Liverpool with 34 crew members and had suffered one crew death on her voyage.

Thomas Leyland & Co., the owners, made a net profit of £19,133 10s 5d on the voyage. The profit per captive averaged £58 13s 10d. This result was highly satisfactory to the owners, if not to the captives. (Note: Leyland had five enslaving vessels that returned and whose voyages's profits were reported: Louisa, Lottery, on her third enslaving voyage, Lottery, on her sixth enslaving voyage, Enterprise, and Fortune (1800 ship), on her second enslaving voyage. On a per captive, basis, Louisa's voyage was the third most profitable, and close to that of the two most profitable. The significance of this data rests in its scarcity, and consequently in the impact of this data on perceptions of the profitability of the enslaving trade. As one source points out, closer examination of these numbers has shown that they represented an overestimate. The current state of research suggests that the profitability of trading in enslaved people averaged between 8-10% of invested capital, and was subject to great variability making a voyage essentially a lottery.)

5th voyage transporting enslaved people (1803–1804): War with France had resumed by the time Louisa sailed on her next enslaving voyage. Captain Thomas Harney acquired a letter of marque on 23 May 1803, and sailed on 9 June. In 1803, 99 vessels sailed from English ports, bound for the trade in enslaved people; 83 of these vessels sailed from Liverpool.

Harney acquired captives at Angola and arrived at Kingston on 21 January 1804 with 308. Louisa sailed from Kingston on 10 April and arrived back at Liverpool on 20 May. She had left Liverpool with 54 crew members and had suffered nine crew deaths on her voyage.

6th voyage transporting enslaved people (1804–loss): Captain Harney sailed from Liverpool on 27 July 1804. In 1804, 147 vessels sailed from English ports, bound for the trade in enslaved people; 126 of these vessels sailed from Liverpool.

== Loss ==
Lloyd's List reported in January 1805 that Louisa, of Liverpool, Hanny, master, had been lost on the coast of Africa. Her crew were saved. Louisa, Harney, master, had been on her way to Angola when she was totally lost after she struck a hidden rock at "Cove Lopez".

In 1805, 30 British enslaving vessels were lost; 13 were lost on the coast of Africa. During the period 1793 to 1807, war, rather than maritime hazards or resistance by the captives, was the greatest cause of vessel losses among British slave vessels.

Captain Harney sailed Lottery on her eighth enslaving voyage, leaving Liverpool on 26 September 1806. He died on 6 February 1807 during the voyage.
