= Kingsmill (1798 ship) =

History

France
- Name: Unknown
- Launched: 1793
- Fate: Captured c. 1798

Great Britain
- Name: Kingsmill
- Owner: 1798:Mullion, Lennox & Co.; 1804:Forbes & Co. or Tobin & Co.; 1806:Swann & Co.; 1808:Humble & Co.; 1810:Holland & Co.; 1811:Gladstone & Co.
- Acquired: c.1798 by purchase of a prize
- Fate: Severely damaged 1821; not listed in 1822

General characteristics
- Tons burthen: 310, or 500, or 504, or 510, or 514, or 516, or 518 (bm)
- Propulsion: Sail
- Complement: 1798:75; 1799:60; 1804:45; 1808:30; 1810:18
- Armament: 1798:26 × 12-pounder guns + 6 swivel guns; 1799:26 × 9&12-pounder guns; 1804:20 × 9-pounder guns; 1808:22 × 18&12-pounder guns; 1809:18 × 12-pounder guns + 4 × 18-pounder carronades; 1810:10 × 12-pounder guns; 1812:4 × 9-pounder guns + 10 × 12-pounder carronades
- Notes: Two decks

Kingsmill was a French vessel launched in 1793 under a different name, captured in 1798, and sold to British owners who renamed her. She then became a slave ship, making three voyages from Africa to the West Indies in the triangular trade in enslaved people. A French privateer captured her in 1804, but she returned to her owners within the year. In 1807, after the end of British participation in the trans-Atlantic slave trade, Kingsmill became a West Indiaman. In 1814 she became the first ship to trade with India under a license from the British East India Company (EIC) after the EIC lost its monopoly on British trade with India. She was badly damaged in 1821 and subsequently disappears from the registers.

== Career ==
Kingsmill first appeared in Lloyd's Register (LR) in 1798 with T[hohmas] Mullin, master, H[mlet] Mullin, owner, and trade Liverpool—Africa. (Note: Before captaining Kingsmill, Thomas Mullion had served as captain on Amacree. When Thomas Mullion sailed Amacree from Liverpool on 6 June 1797, he was only 20 years old, and the youngest captain to sail from Liverpool. After Kingsmill, he would captain Princess Amelia and Robert. He would die in July 1806, while captain of Robert.) (Note: Hamlet Mullion was possibly Thomas Mullion's elder brother. Hamlet Mullion had been a captain of slave ships from 1792 to 1797, before becoming a merchant and owner of slave ships.) Her burthen appeared as 310 tons, but that was corrected to 510 tons in the 1799 volume.

Captain Thomas Mullion acquired a letter of marque on 10 May 1798. Because of her size, Kingsmill was rated as having a legal capacity of 560, or 850 slaves. (Note: By one account, an Act of Parliament permitted slave ships to carry five slaves for every three tons of burthen. It also mandated that crews number 10 men per 100 captives. However, the Slave Trade Act 1788 (Dolben's Act), apparently set the limit at 1.67 slaves per ton for the first 207 tons (bm), and one slave per ton thereafter. This would yield a maximum of 560 slaves for Kingsmill.)

=== 1st voyage transporting enslaved people (1798–1799) ===
Mullion sailed Kingsmill to the Bight of Biafra and Gulf of Guinea islands. He sailed from Liverpool on 4 July 1798. In 1798, 160 vessels sailed from English ports, bound for Africa to acquire and transport enslaved people; 149 of these vessels sailed from Liverpool. This was the largest annual number of vessels in the period 1795 to 1804.

On 22 January 1799 Kingsmill was reported to be off the coast of Africa, with destination Dominica. She was still of the coast on 22 January. Kingsmill took her captives to Martinique. By 16 April she was at Martinique with destination Liverpool. She apparently carried 650 captives, the second largest number of all Liverpool slave ships that sailed between 5 January 1798 and 5 January 1799.

By another account, she was at Dominica with 627 captives before sailing on to Martinique. She arrived at Martinique on 16 December 1798. She sailed for Liverpool on 11 March 1799, and arrived back there on 12 April. She had left Liverpool with 82 crew members and had suffered seven crew deaths on her voyage.

=== 2nd voyage transporting enslaved people (1799–1801) ===
For reasons that are not clear, Mullion acquired a second letter of marque on 10 July 1799. In 1799 he made a second slaving voyage to the Bight of Biafra and Gulf of Guinea islands and then Martinique. On 27 July 1799, she sailed for Africa. In 1799, 156 vessels sailed from English ports, bound for Africa to acquire and transport enslaved people; 134 of these vessels sailed from Liverpool.

By another account, on 24 January 1800, Kingsmill was at Liverpool, with destination the Windward Coast. On 18 April she was still at Liverpool, with destination Bonny (Bight of Biafra).

By 28 November 1800, Kingsmill was at Bonny with destination Martinique. She arrived at Martinique on 21 September 1899, with 433 captives. She left Martinique on 7 January 1801, and arrived at Liverpool on 23 February. She had sailed from Liverpool with 69 crew members and had suffered seven crew deaths on her voyage.

=== 3rd voyage transporting enslaved people (1802–1803) ===
In 1802 Captain J. Tobin sailed Kingsmill on her third slaving voyage. He too sailed to the Bight of Biafra and Gulf of Guinea islands, but took his captives to the Bahamas. Kingsmill sailed from Liverpool on 15 October 1802. In 1802, 155 vessels sailed from English ports, bound for Africa to acquire and transport enslaved people; 122 of these vessels sailed from Liverpool.

Kingsmill arrived at the Bahamas on 19 April 1803, with 395 captives. She was one of only four vessels to bring enslaved people from the Bight of Biafra to the Bahamas, and all four came from Bonny and arrived in 1802–1803. She arrived back at Liverpool on 6 July 1803. She had left Liverpool with 46 crew members and had suffered two crew deaths on the voyage.

=== Capture ===
From here on there is a period where Kingmill's history becomes ambiguous. On 27 February 1804, Captain John Moon received a letter of marque. He did not appear in Lloyd's Register or the Register of Shipping, but the Kingsmill of the letter is of 500 tons, and there was only one other contemporary Kingsmill, and she was of 148 tons.

Lloyd's List (LL) reported on 26 June 1804 that the French privateer Buonaparte captured Kingsmill as she was sailing from Liverpool to Barbados and took her into Guadeloupe. Captain Moon was killed in the engagement.

In the table below, columns two through four are from Lloyd's Register, and columns five through seven are from the Register of Shipping.

Year	Master	Owner	Trade	Master	Owner	Trade
1804	J. Tobin	Tobin & Co.	Liverpool—Africa	J. Tobin	Forbes & Co.	Liverpool—Africa
1805	J. Tobin	Tobin & Co.	Liverpool—Africa	Not listed		
1806	J. Tobin	Tobin & Co.	Liverpool—Africa	Not listed		
1807	W. Wade	Swann & Co.	Liverpool—Barbados	Not published		
1808	W. Wade	Swann & Co.	Liverpool—Barbados	Not published		
1809	Hanby	Humble & Co.	Liverpool—Demerara	J. Hanley	Holland & Co.	Liverpool—West Indies

It is not clear how Kingsmill returned to her owners' hands. The fact that she did suggests that she was recaptured relatively quickly. (Note: HMS Cyane captured Bonaparte, of eighteen 8-pounder guns and 150 men on 12 November 1804 off the island of Marie-Galante. Captain George Cadogan of Cyane reported that Bonaparte had sustained extensive damage three days earlier in an engagement with three British letters of marque that she had captured. In January 1805 HMS Barbadoes recaptured an unnamed "English Guineaman, laden with slaves", but this is too late to be Kingsmill.) In 1806 Swann & Co. purchased Kingsmill.

On 17 September 1808 Swann & Co. sold Kingsmill to Humble & Holland. Captain John Hanley acquired a letter of marque on 20 September 1808. The data in the table below is from Lloyd's Register.

Year	Master	Owner	Trade
1810	Hanby; J. Brown	Humble & Co. Holland & Co.	Liverpool—Demerara; Liverpool—The Brazils
1811	J. Brown; M'Clune	Holland & Co.	Liverpool—The Brazils

Captain John Brown acquired a letter of marque on 8 May 1810. In 1811 John & Robert Gladstone & Co. purchased Kingsmill. (John Gladstone was father of the future Prime Minister William Ewart Gladstone.)

Year	Master	Owner	Trade
1812	J. M'Clure	Gladstone & Co.	Liverpool—Demerara
1813	J. M'Clure	Gladstone & Co.	Liverpool—Demerara
1814	J.M'Clure; Casells	Gladstone & Co.	Liverpool—Madeira

In 1814 Kingsmill became the first vessel to sail to India after the EIC lost its monopoly on trade with India. (Note: Other vessels trading with India in which Gladstone had an ownership interest included: Roscoe, Duke of Lancaster, Seaforth, Theodosia, Richard, Bencoolen, and Westmoreland.)

She sailed after George Canning wrote on 16 May 1814 to Secretary of the Admiralty John Wilson Croker requesting an exemption for her from the requirement that vessels travel in convoy. She had missed the convoy and Croker argued that Gladstone would suffer a substantial financial loss if she had to await the next convoy. Croker further argued that Kingsmill was well-armed and so would not be vulnerable to attacks from most privateers. (Note: The first formal licence was issued to Alcyone.)

Kingsmill, A. Cassels, master, sailed on 22 May and returned 15 months later with a profitable cargo. Thereafter she traded between Liverpool and Bengal. By 1818 R. M'Dowall had replaced Cassels as master.

Year	Master	Owner	Trade	Source
1821	R. "McDwl"	Gladstone	Liverpool—Bombay	Lloyd's Register
1821	M'Dowall	Gladstone	Liverpool—"F.Ind"	Register of Shipping
1821	C. Parnell	Gladstone	Liverpool—Valparaiso	Lloyd's Register — Supple.

== Fate ==
Lloyd's List reported on 9 February 1821 that Kingsmill, Purnell, master, ran aground on the North Bank while sailing from Liverpool to Valparaiso. She was gotten off and taken into King's Dock, where her cargo had to be unloaded as she had sustained much damage. At one point she had four feet of water in her hold, but it was believed that the dry goods were not injured. Kingsmill is not listed after 1821.
