= Enterprize (1803 ship) =

History

France
- Launched: 1797
- Captured: 1803

United Kingdom
- Name: Enterprize
- Owner: 1803:Thomas Leyland, Thomas Molyneux, and Robert Bullin; 1808:Clarke & Co.
- Acquired: 1803 by purchase of a prize
- Fate: Wrecked 1810

General characteristics
- Tons burthen: 398, or 403, or 405 (bm)
- Propulsion: Sails
- Complement: 1803:40; 1808:40
- Armament: 1803:20 × 9-pounder guns; 1808:20 × 9-pounder guns

Enterprize was launched in France in 1797, probably under another name. The British captured her in 1803 and new owners sailed on four voyages as a slave ship. She twice recaptured British vessels, one a slave ship and one a merchant vessel, and once repelled an attack by a French privateer. Circa 1808 she left the slave trade and new owners sailed her to South America, where she was wrecked in 1810.

== Career ==
Messrs. Thomas Leyland, Thomas Molyneux, and Robert Bullin acquired Enterprize and outfitted her as a slave ship. They also engaged Caesar Lawson to be her master. Captain Caesar Lawson acquired a letter of marque on 16 July 1803. (Note: They provided Lawson with detailed instructions on 18 July 1803.)

Enterprize first appeared in Lloyd's Register (LR) in 1803.

Year	Master	Owner	Trade	Source
1803	C.Lawson	T.Leyland	Liverpool–Africa	LR

=== 1st voyage transporting enslaved people (1803–1804) ===
Enterprize sailed from Liverpool on 20 July 1803. In 1803, 99 vessels sailed from London ports, bound for the trade in enslaved people; 83 of these vessels sailed from Liverpool.

On 26 August, at 22°47′N 26°14′W, Enterprize detained the Spanish brig St Augustin, Captain Josef Antonio de Ytuno, master. St Augustin had been sailing from Malaga to Vera Cruz. Enterprize sent her into Holylake, where she arrived on 25 October. The authorities released St Augustin on 6 December.

On 10 September Enterprize recaptured John, of Liverpool at 4°20′N 11°10′W. John had 261 slaves aboard that she then delivered to Dominica on 2 November. The French privateer Vengeance, of 14 guns and 140 men, had captured John in August off the coast of Africa. (Note: Vengeance was a privateer commissioned at Saint-Domingue in March 1804.)

On 23 September Enterprize arrived at Bonny. She gathered her slaves and arrived at Havana on 9 January 1804. At Havana she sold 392 slaves. She sailed from Havana on 27 March and arrived at Liverpool on 26 April. She had sailed from Liverpool with 65 crew men and suffered four crew deaths on the voyage.

Enterprize brought back with her a cargo that consisted of one puncheon and one chest of "East India good", two elephant teeth (ivory tusks), 906 boxes of sugar, 30 tons of logwood, an 30 bundles of sarsaparilla.

Voyage profitability: Outfitting Enterprize cost £8,148 18s 8d. Her trading cargo cost £8,896 3s 9½d. The total cost was £17,045 2s 5½d. She delivered to Joaquin Perez de Urria, at Havana, 412 slaves. The slaves included 194 men, 32 men-boys, 66 boys, 42 women, 36 women-girls, and 42 girls. Nineteen slaves died, and one proved unsalable. The profit on the round trip consisted of the proceeds from the sale of the 392 slaves, salvage for John, and profit on the back-haul cargo of ivory, logwood, sugar, etc. There was an additional cost arising from the detention of St Augustine. The total profit on the voyage was £24,430 8s 11d. Leyland's share was one half; the two other partners each received one quarter.

=== 2nd voyage transporting enslaved people (1804–1805) ===
Captain Lawson sailed from Liverpool on 5 July 1804. Enterprize gathered her slaves at Bonny and landed 387 at Kingston, Jamaica, on 19 December.

Lloyd's List reported on 25 January 1805 that Enterprize, Lawson, master, had passed Barbados on her way to Jamaica. She had had a "severe Engagement" with a privateer.

Enterprize sailed from Kingston on 22 April 1805, and arrived back at Liverpool on 5 July 1805. She had left Liverpool with 49 crew members and she suffered 11 crew deaths on the voyage.

=== 3rd voyage transporting enslaved people (1805–1806) ===
Captain Lawson sailed from Liverpool on 18 September 1805. Enterprize gathered her slaves and landed 368 at Montego Bay, Jamaica, on 29 January 1806. She sailed from Kingston on 29 March, and arrived back at Liverpool on 14 June. She had left Liverpool with 52 crew members and she suffered eight crew deaths on the voyage.

=== 4th voyage transporting enslaved people (1806–1807) ===
Captain Lawson sailed from Liverpool on 27 September 1806. Enterprize gathered her slaves at Bonny and arrived at Montego Bay, Jamaica, on 29 January 1806. She landed 231 there, 31 elsewhere. She sailed from Kingston on 26 June, and arrived back at Liverpool on 13 August. She had left Liverpool with 57 crew members and she suffered 16 crew deaths on the voyage.

The Slave Trade Act 1807, officially "An Act for the Abolition of the Slave Trade" was an Act of the Parliament of the United Kingdom prohibiting the slave trade in the British Empire. Thomas Leyland and the other co-owners of Enterprize then sold her.

=== Merchantman ===
Lloyd's Register for 1809 gave Enterprize's master as W. Bateman, her owner as Clarke & Co., and her trade as London–Brazils.

William Bateman had acquired a letter of marque on 24 May 1808. On 26 October 1809, the French privateer Revenge captured Sarah, Bristow, master, at 48°12′N 10°0′E. Sarah was returning to Britain from the South Seas. The British privateer Enterprize, Bateman, master, recaptured Sarah on 10 November and sent her to Cadiz or Lisbon.

== Fate ==
On 25 May 1810 Lloyd's List reported that a large vessel, believed to be Enterprize, Bateman, master, had been lost at the River Plate. A second report, four days later, confirmed that the vessel was Enterprize. It added that the crew and a large part of her cargo had been saved.
