= John (1797 ship) =

History

Dutch Republic & Batavian Republic
- Launched: 1785
- Captured: 1797

Great Britain
- Name: John
- Owner: 1797-1800:McDowell, Tremlow, M'Dougal; 1800:Thomas Tremlow and Samuel McDowell; 1806:Jeffrey
- Acquired: 1797 by purchase of a prize
- Captured: Captured and burnt 28 December 1809

General characteristics
- Tons burthen: 260, or 287 (bm)
- Propulsion: Sails
- Armament: 18 × 6-pounder guns

John was launched in the Netherlands in 1785, probably under another name. The British captured her in 1797. The new owners gave her the name John, and she became a merchantman. Between 1800 and 1804 she made three voyages as a slave ship. She then became a trader and transport again until a French privateer captured and burnt her in 1809.

== Career ==
Although John was captured in 1797, she did not enter Lloyd's Register until 1798. It showed her master as Tucker, her owner as McDowall, changing to Tremlow, and her trade as Liverpool–Königsberg, changing to Liverpool-Charleston. The entry in 1799 corrected her burthen from 260 tons to 287, and indicated that she had undergone a small repair in 1798. In 1800 her master changed from Tucker to J. Still, and her owner was M'Dougal. Then in 1801 her master changed from J. Still to S. Read, and her trade was Liverpool–Africa.

1st slave voyage (1800–1801): Captain John Kitts sailed from Liverpool on 18 November 1800. John arrived at Suriname 20 April 1801 and landed 76 slaves. At some point Thomas Boyd replaced Kitts as captain. John sailed from Suriname on 6 July, and returned to Liverpool on 17 September.

2nd slave voyage (1801–1802): Captain Samuel Reid sailed from Liverpool 28 November 1801. John gathered her slaves at Cape Coast Castle and delivered them on 10 July 1802 to Kingston, Jamaica, where she landed 280. She sailed from Kingston on 24 September and arrived back at Liverpool on 4 December. She had left with 28 crew members and she suffered two crew deaths on the voyage.

3rd slave voyage (1803): Captain Charles King sailed from Liverpool on 8 March 1803. John gathered slaves at Gorée and then sailed for the West Indies. In August the French privateer Vengeance, of 14 guns and 140 men, captured John off the coast of Africa. However, on 10 September Enterprize recaptured John. John had 261 slaves aboard that she then delivered to Dominica on 2 November.

The Register of Shipping for 1806 showed John with Macauley, master, Jeffrey, owner, and trade still Liverpool–Africa. She later became a London-based transport.

== Fate ==
John appeared in the Register of Shipping with W. Brown, master, Jeffrey, owner, and trade London transport. The entry also carried the annotation "BURNT" by John's name.

On 28 December 1809 the French privateer Confiance captured and burnt John, Brown, master, in the Atlantic Ocean (48°47′N 9°15′W). John was on a voyage from London to St Michael's (possibly São Miguel Island, Azores). Her crew was carried to Brest.
