= Princess Amelia (1798 ship) =

Triangular trade slave ship

History

Great Britain
- Name: Princess Amelia
- Namesake: Princess Amelia of Great Britain
- Launched: 1798, Liverpool
- Fate: Lost circa 1810

General characteristics
- Tons burthen: 321, or 323, or 330 (bm)
- Complement: 1798: 25; 1803: 25; 1805: 35; 1809: 30
- Armament: 1798: 20 × 9-pounder guns; 1803: 12 × 6-pounder guns; 1805: 16 × 9-pounder guns; 1809: 16 × 9-pounder guns

Princess Amelia was launched in 1798 at Liverpool. She made eight complete voyages as a Liverpool-based slave ship in the triangular trade in enslaved people. After the end of British participation in the Trans-Atlantic slave trade, she became a merchantman. She was probably the Princess Amelia, from Liverpool, that was lost in 1810.

== Career ==
Princess Amelia first appeared in Lloyd's Register (LR) in 1798.

Year	Master	Owner	Trade	Source
1798	Livingston	J.Deare & Co.	Liverpool–Africa	LR

1st voyage transporting enslaved people (1798–1799): Captain John Livingston acquired a letter of marque on 9 October 1798. He sailed from Liverpool on 21 November 1798. In 1798, 160 British vessels sailed from British ports bound on enslaving voyages. This was the largest annual number in the 1795–1804 period. One hundred and forty-nine sailed from Liverpool.

Princess Amelia acquired captives at Bonny and arrived at Kingston, Jamaica on 14 May 1799 with 441 captives. She sailed from Kingston on 17 June and arrived back at Liverpool on 17 September. She had left Liverpool with 51 crew members and she had suffered 20 crew deaths on her voyage.

2nd voyage transporting enslaved people (1799–1800): Captain Livingston sailed from Liverpool on 26 December 1799. In 1799, 156 British vessels sailed from British ports bound on enslaving voyages. One hundred and thirty-four sailed from Liverpool.

Princess Amelia acquired captives at Bonny and arrived at Demerara on 20 June 1800 with 295 captives. She sailed from Demerara on 2 July, and arrived back at Liverpool on 12 September. She had left Liverpool with 38 crew members and suffered eight crew deaths on her voyage.

3rd voyage transporting enslaved people (1801): Captain Livingston sailed from Liverpool on 20 May 1801. In 1801, 147 British vessels sailed from British ports bound on enslaving voyages. One hundred and twenty-two sailed from Liverpool.

On 29 May 1801 Princess Amelia, Livingston, master, was all well at 48°30′N 7°36′W. She was in company with Lottery, Whittle, master, and Louisa, Bernard, master. Princess Amelia acquired captives at Bonny and arrived at St Vincent on 20 October. She sailed from St Vincent on 4 November and arrived back at Liverpool on 27 December. She had left Liverpool with 40 crew members and she had suffered two crew deaths on her voyage.

4th voyage transporting enslaved people (1802–1803): Captain Thomas Mullion sailed from Liverpool on 2 April 1802. (Note: Mullion had served as captain on Amacree and Kingsmill. When Mullion sailed Amacree from Liverpool on 6 June 1797, he was only 20 years old, and the youngest captain to sail from Liverpool. He died in 1806 while captain of Robert.) Because the voyage began during the Peace of Amiens, Captain Thomas Mullion did not acquire a letter of marque. In 1802, 155 British vessels sailed from British ports bound on enslaving voyages. One hundred and twenty-two sailed from Liverpool.

Princess Amelia acquired captives at Angola and arrived at St Croix on 6 October 1802. She left there on 13 December and arrived back at Liverpool on 2 February 1803. She had left with 33 crew members and had suffered one crew death on her voyage.

At the time Saint Croix was a Danish colony. In 1792, the Danish government passed a law that would outlaw Danish participation in the trans-Atlantic enslaving trade from early 1803 on. This led the government in the Danish West Indies to encourage the importation of captives prior to the ban taking effect. One measure that it took was to open the trade to foreign vessels. Records for the period 1796 to 1799 alone show that 24 British enslaving ships, most of them from Liverpool, arrived at St Croix and imported 6,781 captives.

5th voyage transporting enslaved people (1803–1804): War with France had resumed before Princess Amelia sailed on her fifth enslaving voyage. Captain Donald McDonald acquired a letter of marque on 25 May 1803. Princess Amelia sailed from Liverpool on 19 June. In 1803, 99 British vessels sailed from British ports bound on enslaving voyages. Eighty-three sailed from Liverpool.

Princess Ameliaacquired captives at Bonny and arrived at Demerara on 10 December with 300 captives. She sailed from Demerara on 19 January 1804 and arrived back at Liverpool on 26 March. She had left with 33 crew members and had suffered one crew death on her voyage.

5th voyage transporting enslaved people (1804–1805): Captain McDonald sailed from Liverpool on 22 June 1804. In 1804, 147 British vessels sailed from British ports bound on enslaving voyages. One hundred and twenty-six sailed from Liverpool.

Princess Amelia acquired captives at Bonny and arrived at Dominica on 11 December with 309 captives. She had embarked 382 captives, for a mortality rate of 19%.

Princess Amelia sailed for Liverpool on 22 February 1805 and arrived back there on 1 April. She had sailed from Liverpool with 41 crew members and she had suffered seven crew deaths on her voyage.

6th voyage transporting enslaved people (1805–1806): Captain James Dickson acquired a letter of marque on 20 June 1805, and sailed from Liverpool on 11 July. Princess Amelia gathered captives at Bonny and arrived at Dominica on 14 February 1806, after stopping at Barbados on 18 January. Princess Amelia sold her captives at Dominica. She had embarked 336 captives and she arrived with 272, for a mortality rate of 19%.

Princess Amelia sailed from Dominica on 17 March and arrived back at Liverpool on 1 May. She had left Liverpool with 44 crew members and had suffered five crew deaths on her voyage.

7th voyage transporting enslaved people (1806–1807): Captain Dickson sailed from Liverpool on 27 June 1806. Princess Amelia acquired captives at Bonny and arrived at Dominica on 5 December. She sailed from Dominica on 26 February 1807 and arrived back at Liverpool on 12 April.

8th voyage transporting enslaved people (1806–1807): The Slave Trade Act 1807, which banned British vessels from participating in the Trans-Atlantic slave trade, took effect on 1 May 1807. However, by clearing customs before the deadline, Captain Dickson was able to squeeze out one last legal slave-trading voyage even though Princess Amelia did not actually sail until 18 May.

Princess Amelia acquired captives at Bonny and arrived at Dominica on 21 November with 282 captives. She arrived at London on 14 August 1808 from Grenada. She had left Liverpool with 40 crew members and she had suffered 11 crew deaths on her voyage.

Year	Master	Owner	Trade	Source
1809	J.Dickson; R.Alem	Brade & Co. Holland & Co.	Liverpool–Africa; Liverpool–Brazils	LR

Captain Robert Allam acquired a letter of marque on 6 May 1809.

Year	Master	Owner	Trade	Source
1810	J.Rowe	Holland & Co.	Liverpool–Brazils	LR

== Fate ==
In February 1810 Lloyd's List reported that Princess Amelia, from Liverpool, was lost in "River St Mary's".

Princess Amelia was last listed in Lloyd's Register in the volume for 1810.
