= Lottery (1796 ship) =

British enslaving ship (1796–1808) and merchantman (1808–1810

History

Great Britain
- Name: Lottery
- Owner: 1796: Thomas Leyland; Circa 1805: William Coupland, Thomas Lance, William Buck Cripps, & Benjamin Gray
- Launched: 1796, Liverpool
- Fate: Wrecked 30 January 1810

General characteristics
- Tons burthen: 309, or 326 (bm)
- Complement: 1790: 25; 1797: 20; 1799: 20; 1803: 45; 1806: 30; 1808: 30
- Armament: 1796: 12 × 9-pounder guns; 1796: 12 × 6-pounder guns; 1799: 12 × 9-pounder guns; 1803: 18 × 9-pounder guns; 1806: 12 × 9-pounder guns; 1808: 18 × 9-pounder guns

Lottery was launched at Liverpool in 1796. Between 1796 and 1807, she made eight complete voyages as a slave ship in the triangular trade in enslaved people. Detailed and insightful accounts exist for the third voyage. After the end of British participation in the trans-Atlantic enslaving trade, Lottery became a West Indiaman. She was wrecked on 30 January 1810 outbound from Liverpool.

== Career ==
Lottery first appeared in Lloyd's Register (LR), in 1796.

Year	Master	Owner	Trade	Source
1796	W.Brown	T.Leyland	Liverpool–Africa	LR

1st enslaving voyage (1796–1797): Captain William Stringer acquired a letter of marque on 23 May 1796. He sailed from Liverpool on 15 June 1796. Lottery began embarking captives on 16 August at Bonny. She sailed from Africa on 16 September and arrived at Kingston, Jamaica on 21 November. She had embarked 460 embarking and she arrived with 457, for a mortality rate of less than 1%. She sailed for Liverpool on 30 December and arrived back there on 14 February 1797. She had left Liverpool with 32 crew members and had suffered no crew deaths on her voyage.

After the passage of Dolben's Act, the first British legislation passed to regulate the shipping of enslaved people, masters received a bonus of £100 for a mortality rate of under 2%; the ship's surgeon received £50. For a mortality rate between two and three per cent, the bonus was halved. There was no bonus if mortality exceeded 3%. The monthly wage for a captain was £6 per month; that of a surgeon was 6 guineas per month. The chief mate was paid £5 per month. However, for both master and surgeon, bonuses in the form of commissions on the sale of the captives (master), head money on captives delivered (surgeon), and two "privilege slaves" (surgeon and chief mate), were much more important sources of income. (The surgeon and chief mate each received two times the average proceeds per captive of the sale of the captives.)

2nd enslaving voyage (1797–1798): Captain John Whittle acquired a letter of marque on 10 March 1797. He sailed from Liverpool on 9 April. He gathered slaves at Bonny and arrived at Kingston on 14 November. He had embarked 460 slaves and arrived with 450, for a mortality rate of 2%. Lottery sailed from Kingston on 16 February 1798 and arrived at Liverpool on 18 April. She had left Liverpool with 44 crew members and she had suffered three crew deaths on her voyage.

3rd enslaving voyage (1798–1799): Captain John Whittle sailed from Liverpool on 5 July 1798. He acquired slaves at Bonny and arrived at Kingston on 9 December. He arrived with 460 slaves and landed 453. Lottery sailed from Kingston on 13 February 1799 and arrived back at Liverpool on 13 April. She had left Liverpool with 45 crew members and had suffered nine crew deaths on her voyage.

Whittle's logbook from this voyage survives, and with it Leyland's instructions to his captain. Leyland instructed Whittle to sail in company with armed vessels on his way to Africa, and on the Middle Passage. At Bonny he was to buy only captives who appeared to be 24-years old or younger. The Jamaican Assembly had just increased the customs duties by £10 per head on any captive who, in the judgement of the commissioners, appeared to be over 25. Whittle was to maintain strict discipline, ensure that his officers remained sober, and to treat the captives humanly to avoid insurrections and to bring them to market healthy. Leland laid out the usual schedule of emoluments for Whittle, the surgeon, and the other officers, and forbade all trading on own account.

Whittle also kept detailed records of the barter goods Lottery bought, and accounts of the trading' In Jamaica, Whittle sold 453 captives at about £95 each, for a gross revenue of £41,794 13s 4d. One captive, a blind man, was given away. Whittle received £2,378 1s 11d in commissions. The surgeon, Dr. John Tebay, received £265 5s 7d in head money, payment for privilege slaves, and a gratuity. (Tebay died and the cost of his funeral and coffin were deducted from the gross revenue of the voyage.) The chief mate received £184 18s 6½ for two privilege captives. After the deduction of these amounts, duties, sales commission to Leyland's agents at Jamaica (Messrs. Bogle & Jopp), and some other items, the "neat proceeds" were £35,192 17s 10d.

The amount remitted to Liverpool, after payment of all charges, was £22, 726 1s. From this there was a deduction of £2,307 10s for outfitting Lottery, and a deduction of £83266 14s 11d for her cargo (trade goods). The profit on this voyage amounted to £12,091 16s 1d.

4th enslaving voyage (1799–1800): Captain Roger Leatham acquired a letter of marque on 14 May 1799. He sailed from Liverpool on 17 July 1799 and acquired slaves at Bonny. Lottery arrived at Montego Bay on 1 March 1800 with 436 slaves. She sailed from Jamaica on 19 May and arrived back at Liverpool on 15 July. She had left Liverpool with 49 crew members and suffered three crew deaths on her voyage.

5th enslaving voyage (1801–1802): Captain Whittle sailed from Liverpool on 21 May 1801 and gathered slaves at Bonny. On 29 May Lottery, Louisa, master, was all well at 48°30′N 7°36′W. She was in company with Louisa, Bernard, master, and Princess Amelia, Livingston, master. Lottery arrived at Jamaica on 5 November. She sailed from Jamaica on 16 December and arrived back at Liverpool on 16 February 1802.

6th enslaving voyage (1802–1803): This voyage took place during the Peace of Amiens and so Lottery's master did not acquire a letter of marque. Captain Charles Kneal sailed from Liverpool on 21 May 1802 and acquired slaves at Bonny. Lottery arrived at Montego Bay 30 November with 305 slaves and landed all. She sailed for Liverpool on 31 January 1803 and arrived on 25 March. She had left Liverpool with 33 crew members and had suffered two crew deaths on her voyage.

The profit on this voyage amounted to £19,021 12s 0½d. Thomas Leyland received half of this, i.e., £9500 16s. The other two co-owners (R.Bullin and Thomas Molyneux) each received a one-quarter.

7th enslaving voyage (1803–1804): War with France had resumed so Captain Kneal acquired a letter of marque on 29 November 1803. He sailed from Liverpool on 20 December. It is not clear where he acquired slaves, but Lottery did stop at Annobón while at Africa. Lottery arrived at Havana in July 1804 with 295 slaves. She sailed from Havana on 17 September and arrived back at Liverpool on 15 November. She had left Liverpool with 47 crew members and she had suffered eight crew deaths on her voyage.

HLeyland and the other owners sold Lottery before her last enslaving voyage. Lloyd's Register did not record the change until the 1809 issue. The new owners were W. Coupland, and three other investors.

8th enslaving voyage (1806–1807): Captain Thomas Harney acquired a letter of marque on 15 September 1806. He sailed from Liverpool on 26 September 1806. He started to gather slaves at Bonny, but died on 6 February 1807. Captain Samuel VanRanst replaced Harney. Lottery arrived at Montego Bay on 28 April with 225 slaves. She sailed from Jamaica on 26 June and arrived at Liverpool on 16 August. She had left Liverpool with 43 crew members and had suffered ten crew deaths on her voyage.

The Slave Trade Act 1807 ended the participation of British vessels in the trans-Atlantic slave trade. New owners sailed her as a West Indiaman.

Year	Master	Owner	Trade	Source
1809	T.Harvey; Richards	T.Leyland; T.Coupland	Liverpool–Africa	LR
1810	Richards	Coupland	Liverpool–Martinique	LR

Captain William Richards acquired a letter of marque on 21 November 1808.

On 6 December Fanny ran into Lottery, of Liverpool, while Lottery was anchored in the river at Liverpool. Lottery lost her bowsprit and had to cut her cables and go into dock.

== Loss ==
Lottery, Richards, master was lost on 30 January 1810 in Dundrum Bay while on a voyage from Liverpool to the Bahamas. . Her crew were rescued.
