= Thomas Leyland =

English slave trader and politician (1752–1827)

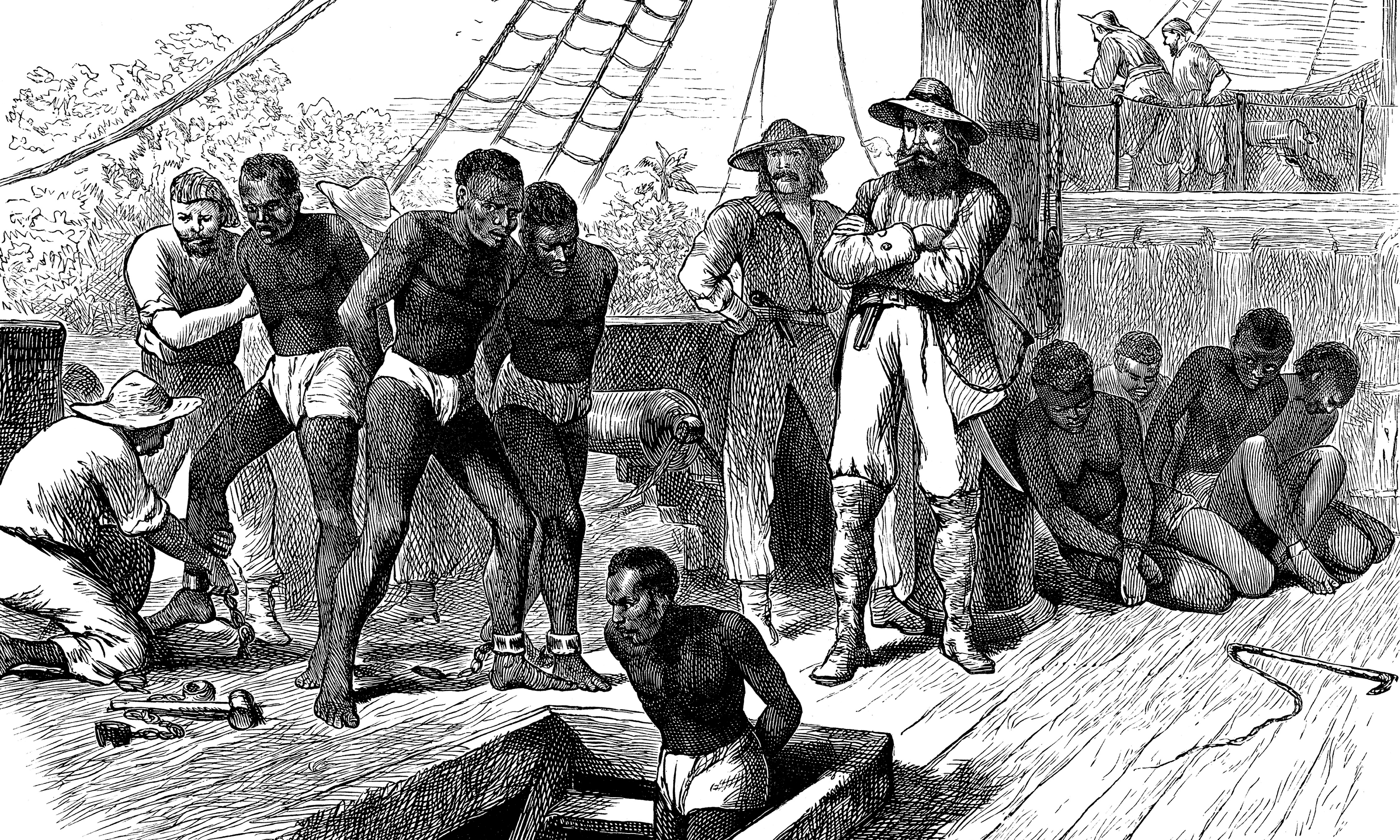
Slavers bringing captives on board a slave ship on Africa's west coast

Thomas Leyland (c. 1752–1827) was an English slave trader. In 1776, he won a lottery and with his share of the winnings, he set himself up in the slave trade. Leyland bought at least 22,365 enslaved Africans and took them on his slave ships to the Americas.

Leyland set up a bank in order to finance the slave voyages of other slaver traders. Upon the abolition of slave trade, he diversified into retail banking. He became a politician and was Lord Mayor of Liverpool three times. While he was in office, the Liverpool council petitioned against regulation of the slave trade. He left £600,000 in his will, meaning he had been one of the richest men in England.

== Early life ==
Thomas Leyland was born circa 1752 in Knowsley, Liverpool. In 1774, he formed the company Dillon and Leyland which traded food produce with Ireland. In 1776, with Dillon he bought a lottery ticket and they won £20,000. Following the win, he married Ellen Bridges, daughter of Edward Bridges.

== Slave trade ==
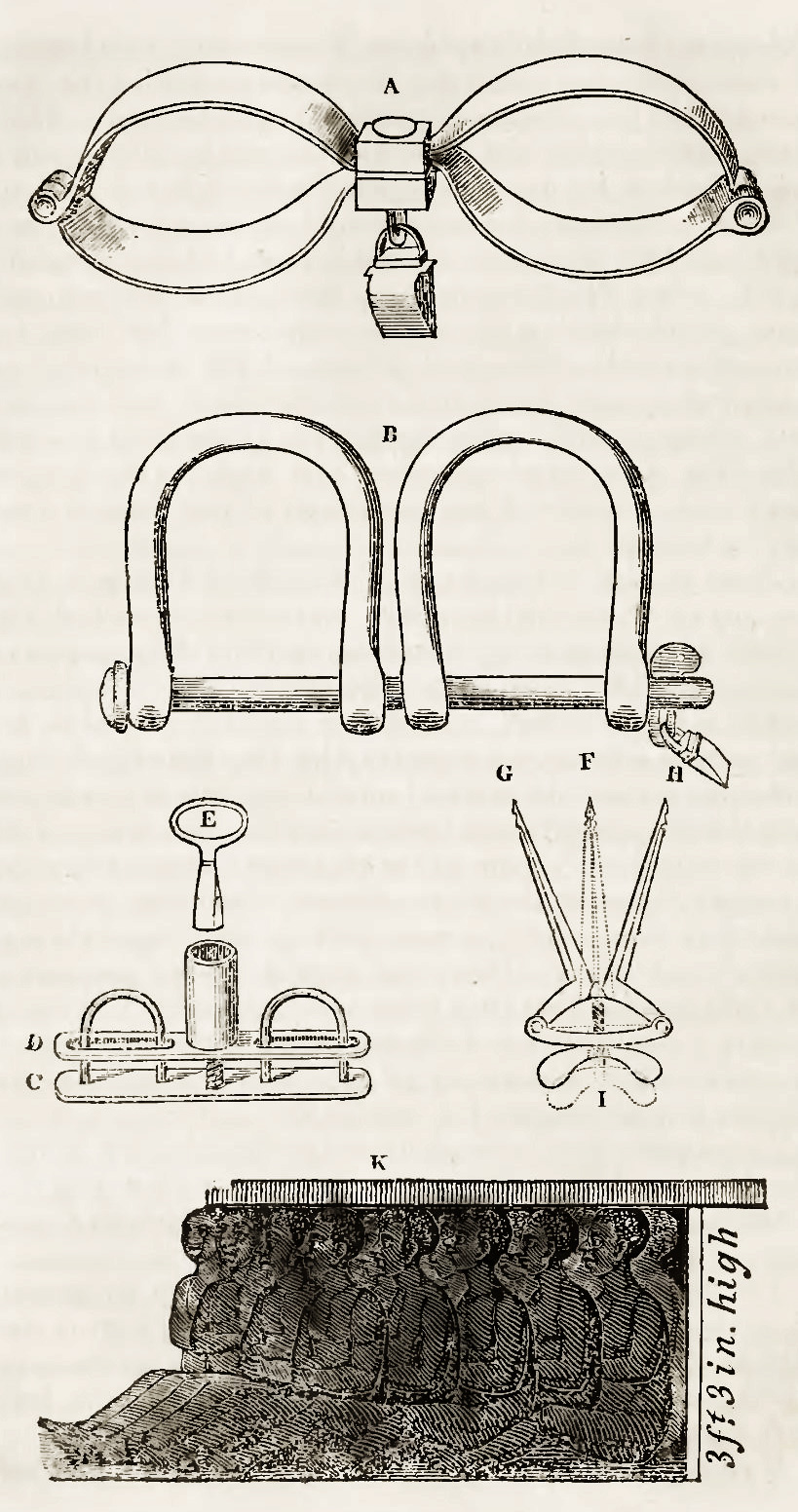
Shackles and handcuffs used to imprison Africans on a slave ship

In the 1780s, using money he had won in the lottery, Leyland set himself up as a slave trader. He began buying shares in slave ships, firstly with a ship called Harlequin, and then with a ship called Madam Pookata. He purchased his third ship, Enterprize, with other investors, but later he bought them out. Enterprize made three enslaving voyages and then in 1787 became shipwrecked near Jamaica after it had disembarked its slaves and was returning to Liverpool. He also owned other enslaving ships: Hannah, Earl of Liverpool, Lottery, and Louisa.

After the original Enterprize was wrecked, Leyland commissioned another enslaving ship that he also named Enterprize, which was completed in 1790. This ship was constructed in Liverpool and was purpose-built for the enslaving trade. Enterprize completed eight enslaving voyages before it was wrecked on its ninth voyage. For this ship, his letter book has been preserved. The letters were sent to his agents and customers and are now located at the Liverpool Record Office.

=== Wreck of the Enterprize ===
The last voyage of Enterprize (built in 1790) began in Liverpool on 21 May 1802. It sailed to New Calabar where it picked up captives and arrived in Cuba where it landed 225 captives. Under Dolben's Act, Enterprize was authorized to carry 238 captives without facing penalties for overcrowding. The ship set sail for Liverpool on 21 December 1802, and was shipwrecked off the coast of Ireland.

Leyland and his partners purchased a third Enterprize that made four enslaving voyages before the owners sold it after the Slave Trade Act 1807 abolished British participation in the trans-Atlantic slave trade.

Leyland was responsible for at least 69 enslaving voyages. He bought and transported an estimated 22,365 enslaved Africans to be sold in the Americas.

== Banking ==
In 1802, Leyland entered into a banking partnership with Clarke and Roscoe, a firm of Liverpool bankers. William Roscoe, one of the partners was a leading abolitionist and this bank was dissolved within 2 months. In 1806, Leyland set up his own bank, with his nephew and fellow slave trader Richard Bullin. The Leyland & Bullin bank supplied finance to other slave traders. In 1807 the slave trade was made illegal in the United Kingdom and Leyland & Bullin diversified their banking operations. Their bank was acquired by The North and South Wales Bank in 1901 which, in 1908, merged with the Midland Bank.

== Lord Mayor of Liverpool ==
As he became richer, Leyland went into politics. Liverpool's local government was "dominated by slave traders" at this time; in 1787, 37 out of 41 of the council's members were involved in the slave trade and all 20 of the Lord Mayors of Liverpool between 1787 and 1807 were involved to some degree. Leyland was Lord Mayor of Liverpool himself three times in; 1798, 1814 and 1820. He was also a candidate to sit in the UK parliament in 1816 and 1820, but was not elected into office.

In April 1799, during the mayoralty of Leyland, Liverpool council submitted objections to the UK government's early anti-slavery legislation. Their petition described the bill as "impracticable in parts, injurious, partial, and oppressive". In May 1799, another bill was introduced into the House of Lords that sought to regulate the shipping of the enslaved in British slave ships; the Liverpool council "held that the health and comfort of the slaves had been already effectually secured".

When Leyland died on 29 May 1827, his will left a fortune of £600,000; he was one of the wealthiest decedents in Britain.

== Legacy ==
Thomas Leyland was one of the wealthiest men in England at the time of his death in 1826. This trade brought incredible riches to Leyland whilst at Walton Hall, Liverpool.

His business partner, Richard Bullin, a Staffordshire Ware merchant, married his sister Margaret. His widow continued to reside at Walton Hall, right up until her death in 1839. Leyland's two nephews, Richard and Christopher Bullin were his primary business partners and they became his beneficiaries, inheriting the Walton estate, on the condition they both assumed the Leyland name and coat of arms, as per instructions in Leyland’s Will. Both nephews died childless and ownership of Walton Hall passed to their younger sister, Dorothy and her husband John Wrench Naylor (1813–1889).

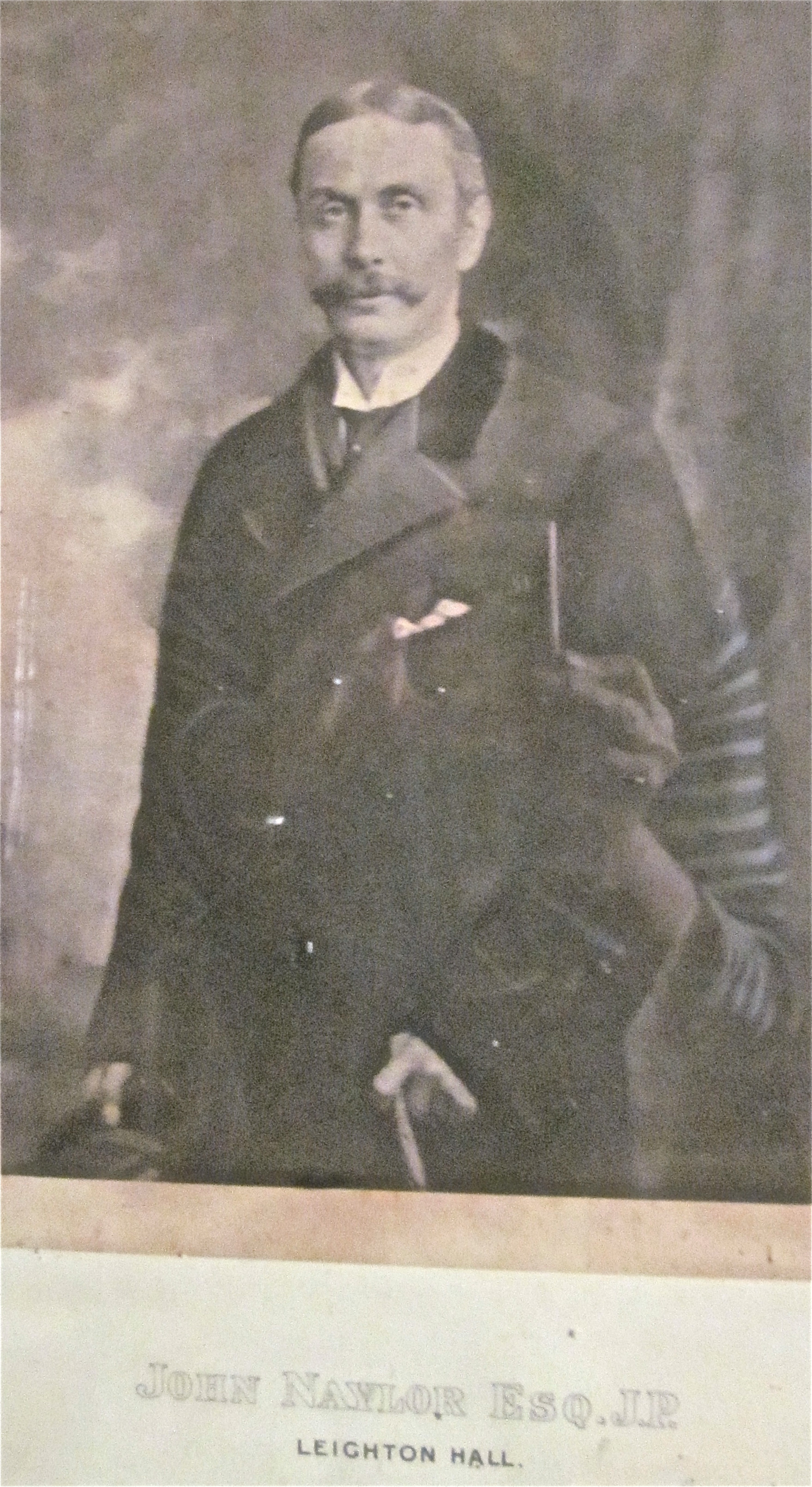
Print of John Naylor JP of Leighton Hall c.1870.

The Leyland estate was subsequently inherited by Christopher John Naylor (1849–1926), who changed his name to Leyland in 1893.

== Sources ==
- Richardson, David (2007). Liverpool and Transatlantic Slavery. UK: Liverpool University Press. ISBN 978-1-84631-066-9.
- Williams, Gomer (1897). History of the Liverpool Privateers. UK: Liverpool University Press.
