= Robert (1805 ship) =

History

United Kingdom
- Name: Robert
- Owner: Hamlet Mullion (Note: Before he became a merchant, between 1792 and 797, Mullion was a captain of ships engaged in transporting enslaved people. He may have been the older brother to Thomas Mullion.)
- Launched: 1797, Brazil
- Acquired: 1805
- Captured: 1808

General characteristics
- Tons burthen: 252 (bm)
- Complement: 1805:35; 1806:35
- Armament: 1805:20 × 18-pounder carronades; 1806:16 × 18-pounder carronades

Robert was built in Brazil in 1797 (probably under another name) and first appeared in Lloyd's Register in 1805. She made two slave trading voyages in the triangular trade in enslaved people. A French privateer captured her in a single-ship action in 1808 on her second voyage.

== Career ==
Robert first appeared in Lloyd's Register in 1805 with Mullion, master, N. Mullion, owner, and trade Liverpool–Africa.

1st voyage transporting enslaved people (1805–1806): Captain Thomas Mullion acquired a letter of marque on 17 July 1805. (Note: Mullion had served as captain on Amacree, Kingsmill, and Princess Amelia. When Mullion sailed Amacree from Liverpool on 6 June 1797, he was only 20 years old, and the youngest captain to sail from Liverpool.) He sailed from Liverpool on 2 August 1805, bound for Senegambia or Sierra Leone. Robert arrived at Charleston on 30 April 1806, where she landed 241 captives. Robert left Charleston on 6 June 1806. Thomas Mullion died on 1 July, and William Green replaced him as captain. Robert arrived back at Liverpool on 1 August 1806. She had left with 45 crew members and six had died during the voyage.

2nd voyage transporting enslaved people (1806–1808): Captain James Phillips acquired a letter of marque on 8 October 1806. He sailed from Liverpool on 12 October 1806, bound for the Cameroons.

Robert grounded and had to put back to Liverpool the next day as she had sustained damage. Robert left Liverpool on 17 October, but had to put back some time later very leaky. Robert left Africa on 5 February 1808.

== Loss ==
Robert was on her way to Barbados when she encountered a French vessel on 7 March 1808 that captured Robert after a severe action. Robert had more than six men wounded, some of whom died later died of their wounds; French casualties were at least two men dead and three wounded.

Robert arrived at Martinique on 12 March 1808, where she landed some 279 captives. She had left Liverpool with 54 crew members and 15 died on the voyage.
