= Enterprize (1783 ship) =

History

Great Britain
- Name: Enterprize
- Owner: Thomas Leyland, Moses Benson, George Johnston, & Alex Telfair
- Builder: France
- Acquired: 1783
- Fate: Wrecked 1787

General characteristics
- Tons burthen: 140 (bm)

Enterprize was launched in France. She was taken in prize circa 1783. Between 1784 and 1787 she made two complete voyages as a slave ship. She was wrecked in 1787 while returning to Liverpool from her third slave trading voyage.

== Career ==
Thomas Leyland was a Liverpool shipowner and businessman who owned several vessels that engaged in the slave trade. One of these was Enterprize, the first of three vessels of that name that he co-owned or owned.

Enterprize first appeared in Lloyd's Register (LR) in 1784.

Year	Master	Owner	Trade	Source & notes
1784	C.Wilson	T.Layland	Liverpool–Africa	LR; large repair 1783

1st slave voyage (1784–1785): Captain Caesar Wilson sailed from Liverpool on 28 March 1784. Enterprize arrived at Dominica on 18 September with 514 slaves. She landed 314 there, and later landed 200 at Jamaica. She arrived back at Liverpool on 11 January 1784. The ship arrival and departure data in Lloyd's List reported Enterprize as coming from Antigua.

2nd slave voyage (1785–1786): Captain Wilson sailed from Liverpool on 27 May 1785. Enterprize acquired her slaves at Bonny. She arrived at her destination on 26 November. (Note: One source gives the destination as Havana. Another gives it as Dominica. Both of these sources give the number of slaves as 447. However, Lloyd's List gives the destination as Dominica, and the number of slaves as 443. Apparently, Enterprize arrived at Havana from Dominica.) Enterprize left for Liverpool on 8 March 1786 and arrived back there on 20 April.

3rd slave voyage (1786–1787): Captain Wilson sailed from Liverpool on 4 July 1786. Enterprize started acquiring slaves in Africa on 20 October, first at Anomabu, and then at Cape Coast Castle. She sailed from Africa on 5 April 1787 and arrived at Annotto Bay, Jamaica, on 20 June. She had embarked 510 slaves and she arrived with 500. She had left Liverpool with 38 crew members and she suffered five crew deaths on the voyage.

== Loss ==
Lloyd's List reported in August 1787 that Enterprize had been lost at Jamaica.
