= Anna (1789 ship) =

British slave ship sunk in 1789

History

Great Britain
- Name: Anna
- Owner: John Dawson
- Launched: 1789, Liverpool
- Fate: Wrecked May 1789

General characteristics
- Tons burthen: 50 (bm)
- Sail plan: Schooner
- Complement: 11

Anna was a schooner launched at Liverpool in 1789. She was lost on the coast of Africa at the outset of a voyage as a slave ship in the triangular trade in enslaved people. The inhabitants of Morocco held her captain and crew captive, enslaving them. The British consul succeeded in getting them set free after 14 months.

Year	Master	Owner	Trade	Source
1789	Irving	Dawson	Liverpool–Africa	LR

== Voyage to transport enslaved people ==
Anna first appeared in Lloyd's Register (LR), in the volume for 1789. Her owner, John Dawson, and his partner Peter Baker, were the largest British firm of traders in enslaved people. Dawson appointed James Irving captain of Anna. She was a purpose-built to transport enslaved people. Anna was a smaller vessel than was common in the trade, less than one tenth the size of Princess Royal, and may have been a response to the restrictions that the Dolben's Act placed on the slave trade. Irving discussed Anna in his letters to his wife, many of which have been recorded. Not long before Anna was lost, he wrote the "Vessel runs out very fast".

== Shipwreck ==
Anna sailed from Liverpool on 2 May 1789. Three weeks later, on 26 May, she shipwrecked on Morocco's Atlantic coast. Lloyd's List reported that Ann, Irving, master, from Leverpool to Guinea, had been wrecked at Uld Nun (Wad Nun (Noun River (Morocco)), in Guelmim-Oued Noun). It further reported that she had been plundered and her crew made captive. The shipwreck represented a significant loss for Dawson because she was a new build and had been registered just 17 days before her first voyage. Although Anna was new, it is unlikely she had a marine chronometer to calculate longitude. Irving was aware of how dangerous the passage through the channel between the Canary Islands and North Africa was, however, he still miscalculated and was caught by strong currents in poor visibility. William Lemprière writes in his account of Irving's captivity that Dawson commanded Irving to sail through the channel and was thus responsible for the ship's loss. The crew included Irving's cousin, also called James Irving, and Mathew Dawson, John Dawson's nephew. In 1789, seven British enslaving ships were lost, four of them on the coast of Africa.

== Crew enslavement ==
The crew of Anna were captured after the shipwreck and enslaved by North Africans. After 14 months of enslavement Irving was released; the exact circumstances of the release are unknown however. Irving was in contact with the British authorities and wrote pleading for his release. Their owners handed Irving and ten other crew from Anna to John Hutchinson, the British vice consul; the men then sailed to England. Ten out of the original crew of 11 survived the shipwreck and arrived back in England in October 1790. The one crew member who died was called James Drachen; he was described in the ship's log as a "Portuguese Black" that died of a fever. In December 1790, Irving became captain of Ellen, another of Dawson's slave ships. The ship's log records Irving's death on 24 December 1791, during her next voyage, but does not indicate how he died.
