= Ann (ship) =

Ann or Anne has been a popular name for ships.

- Anne was a merchant ship of about 140 tons burthen that in 1623, along with Little James, delivered a large contingent of new settlers to Plymouth Colony.
- Ann (1792 ship) was launched at Chester in 1792 as a West Indiaman. From 1796 she made eight complete voyages as a slave ship in the triangular trade in enslaved people. She also began one that was aborted after she was captured and recaptured. On her ninth voyage a French privateer again captured her, but this time her captor plundered and then released her. She returned to merchant trade until she sank on 24 May 1810 in the Old Dock at Liverpool.
- Ann (1797 ship) was built in Batavia in 1797. She came into British hands and made a voyage for the British East India Company (EIC). In 1809 she made a voyage transporting convicts to New South Wales. On her return voyage she carried cargo for the EIC from Calcutta to London. She then became a West Indiaman, trading between London and Jamaica. Later she traded with Australia and India, and is last listed c.1865.
- Anne (1799 ship), also known as Ann, was a Spanish ship that the British had captured in 1799. The British Navy Board engaged her to transport convicts from Cork in Ireland to New South Wales in Australia for one voyage from 1800 to 1801. During this voyage she was possibly present, although she did not participate, in a notable action against a squadron of three French frigates. She then made one voyage for the British East India Company (EIC).
- Ann (1801 ship) was launched at Rotherhithe in the River Thames in 1801. She made eight voyages for the British East India Company (EIC) as an "extra ship", i.e., under charter, between 1801 and 1817. After 1817 she traded with India for some time and she was last listed in 1826.
- Ann (1801 Fowey ship) was launched at Fowey. She did not appear in the registers before 1808, though there were mentions of her in ship arrival and departure data before that. She traded widely and was effectively last listed in 1814.
- Ann (1805 ship) was launched in America in 1800 but then transferred to the United Kingdom in 1805. Between 1810 and 1813 she became a temporary packet operating out of Falmouth, Cornwall for the Post Office Packet Service. In 1813 an American privateer captured her in a single ship action, the Royal Navy recaptured her, and a second American privateer captured her again, in a single ship action.
- Ann (1807 ship) was a slave ship that sailed from Liverpool in 1807. In mid-December she was on the Windward Coast when she exploded with the loss of some 100 slaves and some crew.
- HMS Fawn was a Cormorant-class ship-sloop of the British Royal Navy, launched in 1807. Before she was sold in 1818 she captured one privateer and destroyed another, and participated in three campaigns. In all, her crew qualified for three clasps to the Naval General Service medal (NGSM). After the Royal Navy sold her in 1818 she became the whaler Ann. She then made seven whaling voyages to the Pacific, and especially to the waters off New Zealand, between 1820 and 1844. She was broken up on her return from her last voyage.
- Anne (1948 ship) was a Norwegian ship, renamed Holmbank in 1962 after being bought by a New Zealand company. She sank after running aground near Banks Peninsula in 1962.

== See also ==
- HMS Anne
- Hired armed brig Ann
- Hired armed cutter Ann
- Anna (ship)
