= Anna (ship) =

Several vessels have been named Anna:

- Anna (1739 ship) was a merchant vessel originally employed as a collier taking coal from Yorkshire to London. The Admiralty chartered her in 1739 and subsequently purchased her to carry additional stores for the squadron of Commodore George Anson on his voyage around the world in 1740–44. She was often referred to as 'Anna Pink', as a 'Pink' is a type of ship with a narrow stern. She was scuttled on 18 August 1742 in Cumberland Bay, Juan Fernández.
- Anna (1789 ship) was a small schooner of 50 tons (bm), launched at Liverpool in 1789. She was wrecked on the coast of North Africa in 1789 at the outset of her first enslaving voyage. Captain James Irving and his crew were themselves enslaved; they were released some 16 months later.
- Anna (1790 ship) was launched at Bombay. She was often called Bombay Anna to distinguish her from Bengal Anna . Bombay Anna made two voyages for the British East India Company (EIC). She was lost at sea in 1816.
- Anna (1793 ship) was launched at Calcutta in 1793. She was often called Bengal Anna to distinguish her from Bombay Anna. Bengal Anna made three voyages for the British East India Company (EIC). She was lost on the coast of Chittagong c.1811, after participating in a military expedition.

== See also ==
- Ann (ship)
