= Union (1796 ship) =

History

Great Britain
- Name: Union
- Owner: John Dawson & John Rackham
- Acquired: circa 1796
- Captured: circa 1797

General characteristics
- Tons burthen: 95 (bm)

Union was a vessel acquired in 1796 by owners in Liverpool. Captain Archibald Galbraith sailed from Liverpool on 2 August 1796, bound for West Africa to engage in the triangular trade in enslaved people. In 1796, 103 vessels sailed from English ports, bound for Africa to acquire and transport enslaved people; 94 of these vessels sailed from Liverpool.

Lloyd's List reported in March 1797 that a French squadron under "Renier" had captured Bell, Thompson, master, Falmouth, Pearson, master, and Union, Galbraith, master, on the African Windward Coast. The French then gave Falmouth up to the crews.

In 1796, 22 British vessels in the triangular trade were lost. Five of these vessels were lost on the coast of Africa. During the period 1793 to 1807, war, rather than maritime hazards or resistance by the captives, was the greatest cause of vessel losses among British enslaving vessels.

Earlier, Galbraith had been captain of the slave ships Brothers, which the French had captured, and Chaser, which was condemned in West Africa on her first voyage before she could embark any enslaved people. After Union he went on to be captain of Goodrich on the third of her seven voyages as a slave ship. The Liverpool merchant John Dawson was the or an owner of Brothers, Chaser, and Union. (Note: Between 1783 and 1792, the firm of Peter Baker and John Dawson was the largest firm in Great Britain in the slave trade. Dawson went bankrupt in 1793, but afterwards returned to the slave trade.)
