= Chaser (ship) =

Several vessels have been named Chaser (or Chacer)

- Chaser (1778 ship) was built in the East Indies in 1778. The Royal Navy purchased her in 1781 and commissioned her as HMS Chaser. A French frigate captured her in 1782 but the Royal Navy recaptured her in 1783 and took her back into service. She was present at a major battle and then sailed to England where the Navy sold her in 1784. As the mercantile Chaser she made five or six voyages as a whaler in the British northern whale fishery and then two to the southern whale fishery. On her way home from the second a French privateer captured her, but some of her crew recaptured her. Next, she began trading with Honduras but was wrecked in late 1795 as she was returning from there to London.
- Chaser (1786 ship) first appeared under that name in British records in 1786. She had been launched in 1771 at Philadelphia under another name, probably Lord North. Lord North became Cotton Planter, and then Planter, before she became Chaser. Between 1786 and 1790 Chaser made four voyages as a whaler in the British southern whale fishery. She then became a merchantman. In 1794 a privateer captured her but the Spanish recaptured her. She became a Liverpool-based slaver. In 1796 she was condemned in West Africa on her first voyage in the triangular trade before she could embark any enslaved people.

== See also ==
- HMS Chaser (P282)
- HMS Chaser (D32)
