= Young Hero (1785 ship) =

Liverpool slave ship (1785–1794

History

Great Britain
- Name: Young Hero
- Owner: 1785:Peter Baker & John Dawson (Note: At the time, Baker and Dawson were the largest firm of slave traders in England.); 1789:John Dawson
- Launched: 1785, Liverpool
- Fate: Condemned 1794

General characteristics
- Tons burthen: 79, or 80, or 100 (bm)
- Length: 64 ft 6 in (19.7 m)
- Beam: 17 ft 6 in (5.3 m)
- Sail plan: Brigantine
- Notes: Two decks & two masts

Young Hero was launched at Liverpool in 1785. She made six complete voyages as a slave ship in the triangular trade in enslaved people. On her first and second voyages she sailed under an asiento, that permitted her owners to bring and sell captives in Spanish territories. She was seized and condemned in 1794 after having landed the captives from her seventh voyage.

== Career ==
Young Hero first appeared in Lloyd's Register (LR) in 1786.

Year	Master	Owner	Trade	Source
1786	J.Forbes	Baker & Co.	Liverpool–Africa	LR

1st voyage transporting enslaved people (1786): On this and her next voyage Young Hero sailed under an asiento, which permitted Baker and Dawson to bring and sell captives in Spanish territories. Captain William Forbes sailed from Liverpool on 15 February 1786. Young Hero arrived in Havana in July 1786 with 210 captives. She arrived back at Liverpool on 1 December. She had left Liverpool with 17 crew members and she had suffered two crew deaths on her voyage.

On 13 December Young Hero, Mollineaux, master, sailed for Trinidad. He returned to Liverpool in late March or early April.

2nd voyage transporting enslaved people (1787): Captain Thomas Molyneux sailed from Liverpool on 2 May 1787. (Note: The trans-Atlantic slave trade database reported that she had left Liverpool on 18 March, but that was not consistent with the ship arrival and departure (SAD) data in Lloyd's List.) Young Hero arrived in Havana in September 1787. She arrived back at Liverpool on 5 November. She had left Liverpool with 16 crew members and she had suffered no crew deaths on her voyage.

The Slave Trade Act 1788 (Dolben's Act), the first law to regulate Britain's slave trade, limited the number of enslaved people that British slave ships could transport, based on the ships' tons burthen. It was the first British legislation passed to regulate transportation of enslaved people. At a burthen of 80 tons, the cap would have been 134 captives; at a burthen of 100 tons the cap would have been 167 capties. After the passage of Dolben's Act, masters received a bonus of £100 for a mortality rate of under 2%; the ship's surgeon received £50. For a mortality rate between two and three per cent, the bonus was halved. There was no bonus if mortality exceeded 3%.

3rd voyage transporting enslaved people (1788–1789): Captain Molyneux sailed from Liverpool on 2 May 1788. He acquired captives at Bonny, and at Bimbia. In January 1789 Young Hero arrived at Trinidad and landed 118 captives. She then sailed to Havana, and there landed 346 captives. (Note: The number of captives is so large relative to the size of the vessel that it may represent an error, or possibly transshipment of captives from Trinidad to Cuba.) Young Hero sailed for Liverpool on 7 May, and arrived there on 17 June.

4th voyage transporting enslaved people (1789–1790): Captain Charles Walker Jones, sailed from Liverpool on 14 July 1789. Young Hero started acquiring captives on 16 September at Cape Coast Castle. She arrived at Trinidad in March 1790 and sailed from there on 3 June. At some point Captain Andrew Irving had replaced Jones and she arrived back at Liverpool on 10 July, under Irving's command. (Note: Irving's next command was a new vessel, Orange Grove, another of Dawson's slave ships. Irving died on 2 March 1791, while master of Orange Grove.)

5th voyage transporting enslaved people (1790–1792): Captain John Ainsworth sailed from Liverpool on 17 August 1790. Young Hero started acquiring captives on 14 November, first an Anomabu, and then at Cape Coast Castle. She sailed from Africa on 5 November 1791, and arrived at Grenada in December. She had embarked 197 captives and she arrived with 197 captives, which would have qualified her master and surgeon to receive the bonus for low mortality. She sailed from Grenada on 20 December and arrived back at Liverpool on 10 February 1792. She had left Liverpool with 14 crew members and had suffered one crew death on her voyage.

6th voyage transporting enslaved people (1792–1793): Captain William Martin sailed from Liverpool on 22 March 1792. He commenced acquiring captives on 17 June at Cape Coast Castle. Young Hero arrived at Kingston on 17 January 1793 with 195 captives. She arrived back at Liverpool on 30 April. She had left Liverpool with 14 crew members and had suffered no crew deaths on her voyage. At some point on the voyage Captain John Clegg had replaced Captain Martin.

Year	Master	Owner	Trade	Source
1794	W.Martin; R.Worthington	Dawson & Co.	Liverpool–Trinidad	LR

7th voyage transporting enslaved people (1793–1794): Captain M. Worthington sailed in May 1794, possibly from London. On 10 December Young Hero arrived at "Antonia" with 136 captives. Antonia is probably Port Antonio, Jamaica.

== Fate ==
Young Hero was seized and condemned in the West Indies.
