= John Dawson (slave trader) =

Slave trade merchant

- Died: 1812
- Occupations: Ship's captain and owner of slave ships

John Dawson (died 1812) was a Liverpool slave trader and captain. Between 1783 and 1792, Dawson and his business partner Peter Baker were the largest slave traders in Great Britain.

== Slave trade ==
In 1790, Dawson owned 19 slave ships, with an average value of £10,000(about £1.5 million today). By the early 1790s, the partners' vessels had completed over 100 voyages. Baker & Dawson became one of the biggest slave-trading partnerships in late 18th-century Liverpool.

In 1786, Baker and Dawson, entered into a contract with the Spanish Government to supply slaves to Spanish America. Their vessels delivered more than 11,000 slaves. It was estimated that the slaves were valued at £350,000.

== Life ==
During one of his voyages Dawson, captured the French East Indiaman Carnatic. When Carnatic came into Liverpool, she was said to be worth £135,000 and the richest prize ever taken and brought safe into port by a Liverpool privateer. Part of the value was due to a box of diamonds that had been found on her. Dawson married the daughter of Peter Baker, the shipbuilder who owned Mentor, and became a partner in the firm of Baker and Dawson.

== List of vessels owned by Baker & Dawson ==
Baker and Dawson were the largest firm of slave traders in England. Vessels they owned, individually or together, included:

- Anna (1789 ship)
- Brothers (1782 ship)
- Carnatic (1770 ship)
- Chaser (1786 ship)
- Garland
- Ellen
- Elliott (1783 ship)
- Mentor (1778 ship)
- Mosley Hill (1782 ship)
- Orange Grove (1790 ship)
- Prince (1785 ship)
- Princess Royal (1783 ship)
- Sisters (ship)
- Union (1796 ship)
- Young Hero (1785 ship)

Sisters, of 252 tons (bm), was launched at Liverpool in 1786. Captain John Elworthy sailed from Liverpool on 16 October 1786. She acquired captives at Bonny. On 22 September 1788 Sisters was declared to have been lost. She disappeared on the coast of Africa or on her way to the West Indies, together with her crew and any captives on board.

=== Captains and crews ===
In January 1782 Dawson employed James Irving as a surgeon on his slave ship Prosperity, captained by James Murphy and based in Liverpool.

Baker and Dawson often re-employed the same captains for their slave voyages. From 1785 to 1795 Thomas Molyneux captained six voyages, Joseph Withers and William Forbes five voyages, and Joseph Fayrer four.

== Bankruptcy ==
The contract that Baker and Dawson with the Spanish government to supply slaves to Spanish America caused the partners to over-reach themselves. During the credit crisis of 1793, Dawson was declared bankrupt in 1793, owing £500,000 (about £74 million today).

== List of vessels owned by John Dawson after 1792 ==
- Brothers (1782 ship)
- Chaser (1786 ship)
- Union (1796 ship)
- Abby: Was of 98 tons (bm). Captain Murdock Murchy sailed from Liverpool on 19 September 1795. She sailed from Africa on 15 May 1796. The French captured her in 1796, after she had embarked her captives. She arrived at Martinique in July with 199 captives.
- General Chacon, of 245 tons (bm), was a French prize that first appeared in Lloyd's Register in 1795. Captain Thomas Molyneux sailed from Liverpool on 23 October 1795, bound for Africa. She was lost at Teneriffe, on her way to Africa.
