= Carnatic Hall =

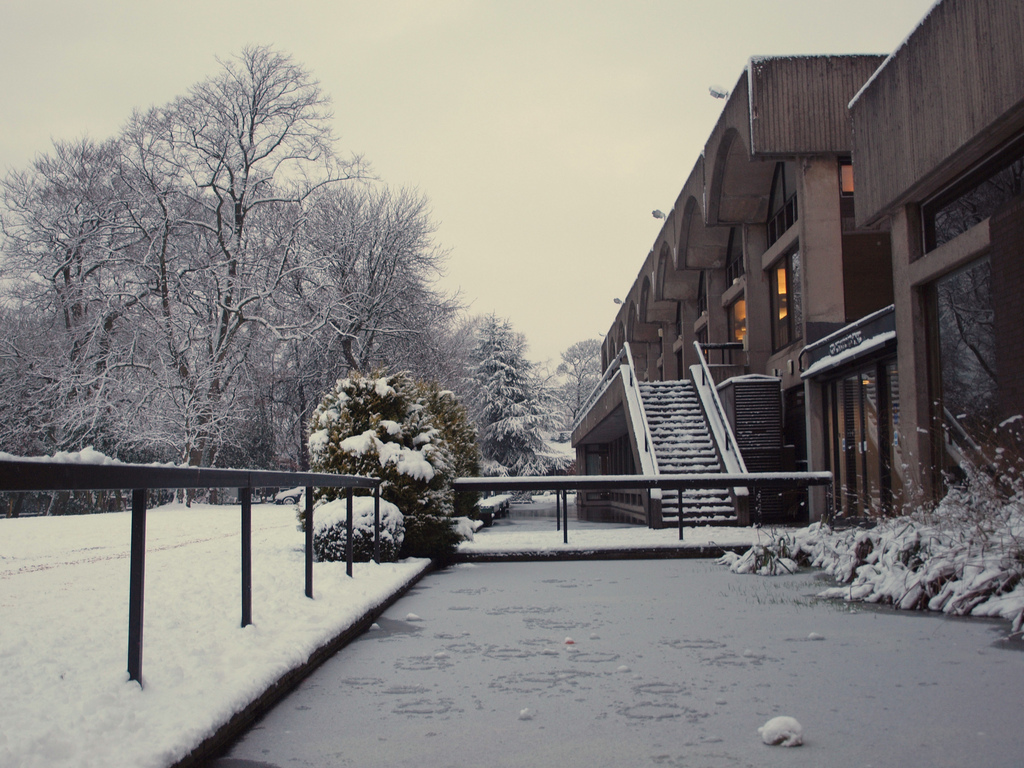
- Carnatic Halls, built on the site in the 1960s

- Location in Merseyside
- 53.377030°N 2.922483°W
- Location: Near Mossley Hill, Liverpool
- OS grid reference: SJ 444 938

History
- Built: 1779
- Built for: Peter Baker
- Demolished: 1964

Carnatic Hall was an 18th-century mansion that was located in Mossley Hill, Liverpool, England.

The house was built in 1779 for slave trader Peter Baker, who served as Mayor of Liverpool in 1795. Originally on the site of Mossley Hall (home of the Ogden family) it was renamed Carnatic Hall by Baker after the French East Indiaman Carnatic, which the privateer Mentor, which Baker owned, had captured in October 1778. Carnatic was said to be the richest prize ever taken and brought safe into port by a Liverpool adventurer, being of the value of £135,000. In 1891 the house burned down and the then owner, Walter Holland, had a hall built in the same style.

In 1947, The University of Liverpool purchased Carnatic Hall as a home for the University of Liverpool Museum. In 1964 the mansion was demolished and replaced with student accommodation, the Carnatic Halls of Residence. This consisted of six residences: McNair Hall, Salisbury Hall, Rankin Hall, Morton House, Lady Mountford Hall, and Dale Hall.

In 2018, it was announced that the Carnatic Student Village would be closing.
