= Goodrich (1793 ship) =

History

Great Britain
- Name: Goodrich
- Builder: Bermuda
- Launched: 1793
- Fate: Wrecked 1808

General characteristics
- Tons burthen: 120, or 126 (bm)
- Sail plan: Brig
- Complement: 1800:20; 1801:15
- Armament: 1796: 8 × 4-pounder guns; 1800: 12 × 6&12-pounder guns; 1801:6 × 12-pounder guns

Goodrich was a brig launched in Bermuda in 1793. She made three voyages between 1795 and 1799as a slave ship in the triangular trade in enslaved people. She then became a general merchantman and was wrecked in 1808.

== Career ==
Goodrich first appeared in Lloyd's Register (LR) in 1795 with Holmes, master, R.Fisher, owner, and trade Liverpool–Africa.

=== 1st enslaving voyage (1795–1797) ===
Captain Joseph Peers sailed from Liverpool on 14 December 1795. He acquired captives at Gambia and arrived at Demerara on 16 November 1796. Goodrich sailed from Demerara on 26 January 1797 and arrived back at Liverpool on 15 March. She had left Liverpool with 15 crew members and she suffered 10 crew deaths on the voyage.

The Slave Trade Act 1788 (Dolben's Act) was the first British legislation passed to regulate slave shipping. The Act limited the number of enslaved people that British enslaving ships were permitted to transport without penalty, based on the ships' tons burthen. At a burthen of 126 tons, the cap would have been 210 captives.

=== 2nd enslaving voyage (1797–1798) ===
Captain Peers sailed from Liverpool on 9 November 1796. He started acquiring captives in Gambia on 16 December, and sailed from Africa on 12 February 1798. On 6 March Goodrich arrived at Demerara with 178 captives. She left Demerara on 9 May and arrived back at Liverpool on 29 June. She had left Liverpool with 21 crew members and she had suffered four crew deaths on the voyage. Captain Peers next captained a different Goodrich on two enslaving voyages (1799, and 1799–1800).

=== 3rd enslaving voyage (1798–1799) ===
Captain Henry Kennedy sailed from Liverpool on 29 October 1798. He acquired captives in Angola. Goodrich arrived at Kingston, Jamaica on 25 June 1799 with 209 captives. She left Kingston on 22 July and arrived back at Liverpool on 3 October. She had left Liverpool with 28 crew members and she suffered 17 crew deaths on the voyage.

=== Merchantman ===
On her return her owners sold Goodrich and she became a general merchantman.

Captain Thomas Richardson acquired a letter of marque on 15 April 1800, and Captain William Rogerson acquired one on 13 February 1801.

Year	Master	Owner	Trade	Source & notes
1800	Kennedy; Richardson	Clarke; Humble & Co.	Liverpool–Africa; Liverpool–Leghorn	Register of Shipping
1801	Richardson; Rogerson	Humble	Liverpool–Leghorn; London–Smyrna	RS
1802	W.Rogerson; J.Mears	Humble; Spurrier	London–Smyrna; Portsmouth–Newfoundland	LR

In September 1803 Lloyd's List reported that a French privateer had captured Goodrich, Mears, master, as Goodrich was sailing from Charleston to Liverpool. The privateer Vigilant, of Guernsey, had recaptured Goodrich and taken her into Guernsey. (Note: On 25 May 1803 Captain Thomas Quertier acquired a letter of marque for Vigilant, a smack of 65 tons (bm). She was armed with eight 3-pounder guns and had a crew of 30 men. Vigilant had been launched at Cowes in 1801. She was registered at Guernsey in 1803. Her registration was transferred to Jersey in 1826.)

Year	Master	Owner	Trade	Source & notes
1807	J.Mears; R.Daw	W.Spurrier	Portsmouth–Newfoundland	LR; good repair 1802

== Fate ==
Lloyd's List (LL) reported in January 1808 that Goodrich, Daw, master, had been wrecked on the Irish coast. She was on a voyage from Newfoundland to Poole, Dorset.
