= Carnatic (1770 ship) =

French and British merchantman trading with India 1770–1781

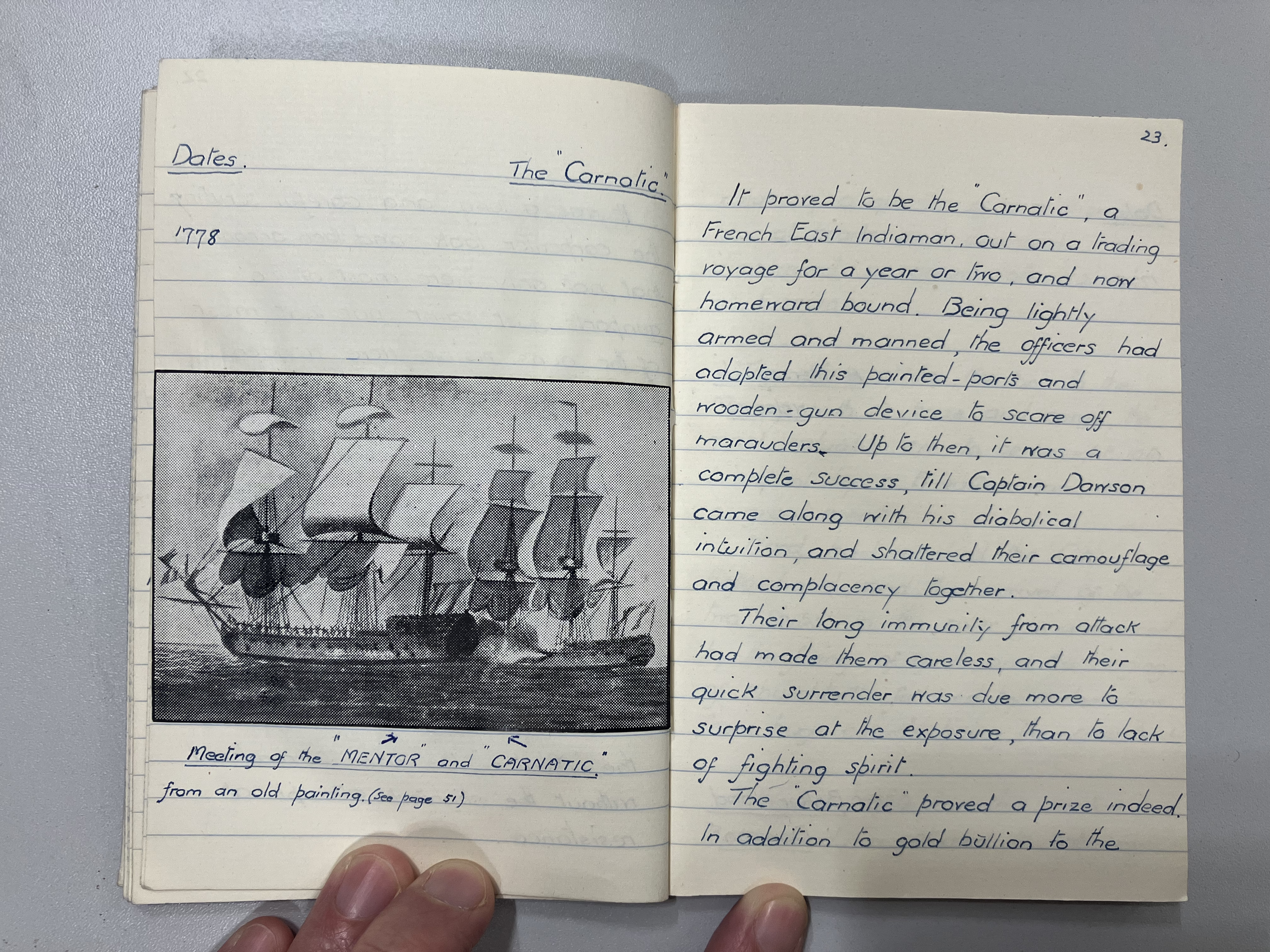
- Newspaper photograph copied into A Liverpool Family: Three Generations of Liverpool Shipbuilders (H.S. Phillips, 1953). The original oil painting was lost in the destruction of the Liverpool Museum authorities' Ship Models room during World War II.

History

Kingdom of France
- Name: Carnatic
- Namesake: Carnatic region
- Launched: 1770
- Captured: 1778

Great Britain
- Acquired: 1778 by capture
- Fate: Wrecked 1–2 August 1781

General characteristics
- Tons burthen: 850 (bm)
- Armament: 24 × 9-pounder + 8 × 6-pounder guns
- Notes: Three decks

Carnatic, launched in 1770, was an East Indiaman belonging to the French East India Company. A British letter of marque captured her in 1778. She became a transport. She was wrecked in 1781.

== Career ==
Carnatic was sailing from India to France when on 28 October 1778 she encountered the Liverpool privateer Mentor. War between Britain and France had broken out in April 1778 and Captain John Dawson sailed Mentor south to attempt to intercept French vessels coming from the Indian Ocean that were not aware of the outbreak of hostilities. When Carnatic came into Liverpool, she carried some £135,000 in pearls and diamonds, and an additional £265k-365k in buillion, making her the richest prize ever taken and brought safe into port by a Liverpool privateer. Part of the value was due to a box of diamonds that had been found on her. (Note: Mentor, of 400 or 500 tons (bm), had been launched at Chester in 1778, and her owner was P.Baker & Co. She was armed with twenty 6–pounder guns, and in 1778 her trade was Liverpool–Jamaica.) Peter Baker, Mentor's owner, retained ownership of Carnatic, (Note: Peter Baker used his gains from the capture to build a mansion at Mossley Hill, three miles south of Liverpool, that he named Carnatic Hall.) and later built a mansion in Liverpool given her name.

Carnatic first appeared in Lloyd's Register (LR) in the volume for 1779.

Year	Master	Owner	Trade	Source
1779	J.Gibbons	P.Baker & Co.	London transport	LR

Lloyd's List reported in February 1780 that Carnatic and several other vessels had come into Cork in distress. Carnatic was on her way back to Britain from the West Indies.

== Loss ==
A gale in the night between 1 and 2 August 1781 at Jamaica drove Carnatic, Gibbons, master, on shore. Although the initial expectation was that she and most of the other vessels that also were driven on shore would be gotten off, the next report had Carnatic and numerous other vessels totally lost; it was hoped that some cargo could be saved.
