= Doe (1782 ship) =

Slave ship

History

Great Britain
- Name: Doe
- Owner: 1787: Moss & Co.; 1789: John Dawson
- Launched: 1780, Thirteen Colonies
- Acquired: 1782 by purchase of a prize
- Renamed: Ellen (1787)
- Captured: 1793

General characteristics
- Tons burthen: 120, or 134, or 152 (bm)
- Length: 60 ft 0 in (18.3 m)
- Beam: 22 ft 4 in (6.8 m)
- Notes: Two decks and three masts

Doe was built in 1780, in the Thirteen Colonies, possibly under another name. She was taken in prize. Between 1783 and 1786 Doe made three complete voyages as a slave ship in the triangular trade in enslaved people. New owners in 1787 renamed Doe to Ellen. Ellen was registered in Liverpool in 1787. Between 1789 and 1792, she made two complete voyages transporting enslaved people. A French privateer captured her in 1793 as she was on her way to the West Indies having embarked captives in Africa on her sixth voyage transporting enslaved people.

== Career ==
One source, drawing on the Liverpool registry of merchant ships for 1787 and 1788, reported that Ellen was a prize taken from the Americans in 1782; the High Court of Admiralty condemned her on 3 July 1782.

Doe first appeared in Lloyd's Register (LR), in the volume for 1783.

| Year | Master | Owner | Trade | Source & notes |
|---|---|---|---|---|
| 1783 | Sutton | Mcleod | Liverpool–Africa | LR; raised and thorough repair 1782 |

1st voyage transporting enslaved people (1783): Captain Thomas Sutton sailed from Liverpool on 1 March 1783. He acquired captives at New Calabar and delivered them to Antigua in August. Doe sailed from Antigua on 1 September and arrived at Liverpool on 29 October. She had left Liverpool with 31 crew members and had suffered five crew deaths on her voyage.

2nd voyage transporting enslaved people (1784–1785): Captain Sutton sailed from Liverpool on 7 March 1784. He acquired captives at Iles de Los. Doe arrived at Charleston on 8 September with 350 captives. She arrived back at Liverpool on 11 January 1785.

On the way from Charleston back to Leverpool, Doe, Sutton, master, rescued the crew of Friendship, Hale, master, which had foundered. Friendship too had been on her way from Charleston to Leverpool.

3rd voyage transporting enslaved people (1785–1786): Captain William Allanson sailed from Liverpool on 2 April 1785. He acquired captives at New Calabar. On her way to the West Indies, Doe stopped at Princes Island. On her way she spoke Princess Royal, Sherwood, master. She arrived at Dominica on 3 October with 232 captives. Allanson was master when she arrived at Dominica. At some point Captain Peter Rome replaced him. Doe sailed for Liverpool on 6 November and arrived there on 18 January 1786. She had left Liverpool with 32 crew members and had 26 crew members when they reached Dominica. She had suffered two crew deaths on her voyage.

On his return, Captain Peter Rome took command of Jemmy. He died on 31 December 1787, during the subsequent voyage transporting enslaved people.

Ellen first appeared under that name in Lloyd's Register in the volume for 1786. Prior to that time her name was Doe.

| Year | Master | Owner | Trade | Source & notes |
|---|---|---|---|---|
| 1786 | W.Skell | T.Moss | Liverpool–Providence | LR; raised and thorough repair 1782, & good repair 1786 |
| 1787 | W.Skell; W.Jackson | T.Moss | Liverpool–Providence | LR; raised and thorough repair 1782, & good repair 1786 |
| 1789 | W.Jackson; John Ford | T.Moss; J.Dawson | New Providence–Liverpool; Liverpool Africa | LR; raised and thorough repair 1782, good repair 1786, & new sides 1788 |

On 19 October 1789 John Dawson purchased Ellen.

4th voyage transporting enslaved people (1789–1790): Captain John Ford sailed from Liverpool on 19 November 1789. He started acquiring captives on 3 February 1790, at Cape Coast Castle. Next, he acquired a captives at Lagos, Onim. Ellen sailed from Africa on 1 May, having embarked 300 captives. She arrived at Jamaica on 10 August, with 194 captives, for a 35% mortality rate in the Middle Passage between Africa and the West Indies. Ford was still master as Ellen approached the West Indies; at some point Captain Benjamin Hull may have replaced him. Ellen sailed from Jamaica on 20 September and arrived back at Liverpool on 23 November. She had left Liverpool with 25 crew members and had suffered six crew deaths on her voyage.

| Year | Master | Owner | Trade | Source & notes |
|---|---|---|---|---|
| 1791 | J.Ford; J.Irving | J.Dawson | Liverpool–Africa | LR; raised and thorough repair 1782, good repair 1786, & new sides 1788 |

Between her return to Liverpool in November and mid-December, Ellen underwent modifications that increased her burthen from 134 to 152, and so the number of captives that Dolben's Act permitted her to carry without penalty from 223 to 253.

5th voyage transporting enslaved people (1791–1792): Captain James Irving sailed from Liverpool on 3 January 1791. However, she was delayed on the coast of Lancashire for at least a month. Irving wrote a letter to his wife from the ship while moored near Ulverston in England. In the letter he wrote about his third mate, Bailey, who had "proved to be a rascal" because he had attempted to escape the ship with two other crew members. Irving wrote "on presenting a Pistol to his head he ran and I secured him". The decision to force three crew members to stay aboard represented a risk to the voyage.

On 4 April Irving started acquiring captives at Cape Coast Castle. From there he sailed to Anomabu to acquire more captives. For five months Ellen sailed between Anomabu and Benin. She sailed from Africa on 16 September. Ellen had embarked 253 captives, the maximum number she was permitted to carry without penalty under Dolben's Act.

Captain Irving died on 24 December; at the age of 32. He was the sixth, and last, crew member to die on the voyage. The chief mate had died about a month earlier, on 28 November. The second mate had been discharged on 25 May. Consequently it was the third mate, James Bailey, who had tried to escape the ship before it had left England, that brought the ship back.

Ellen arrived at Trinidad and Tobago on 11 January 1792, with 206 captives, for a 19% mortality rate on the Middle Passage. She sailed on 30 March and arrived back at Liverpool on 15 May. She had left Liverpool with 16 crew members and had suffered six crew deaths on her voyage.

6th voyage transporting enslaved people (1792–loss): Captain Molyneux sailed from Liverpool in October 1792.

== Fate ==
The French captured Ellen as she was approaching the West Indies and took her and her captives into Les Cayes.

In 1793, 17 British enslaving ships were lost. Nine of those were lost in the Middle Passage, sailing between Africa and the West Indies. During the period 1793 to 1807, war, rather than maritime hazards or resistance by the captives, was the greatest cause of vessel losses among British slave vessels.
