= Goodrich (1799 schooner) =

History

Great Britain
- Name: Goodrich
- Builder: Liverpool
- Launched: 1799
- Captured: July 1808

General characteristics
- Tons burthen: 91 (bm)
- Sail plan: Schooner
- Complement: 10
- Armament: 1805:10 × 6-pounder guns; 1808:4 × 9&3-pounder guns

Goodrich (or Goodrick) was a schooner launched in Liverpool in 1799. Between 1799 and 1807, she made seven voyages as a slave ship in the triangular trade in enslaved people, two of them while being owned by Americans. After the Slave Trade Act 1807 ended the British slave trade she became a merchantman sailing from Guernsey. A French privateer captured her in July 1808.

== Career ==
=== 1st enslaving voyage (1799) ===
Joseph Peers, owner and master, sailed Goodrich from Liverpool, bound for Gambia. (Note: In 1795–1797 and 1797–1798 Peers had been master of the slave ship Goodrich.) She arrived at Demerara on 22 June and landed 147 captives. She left on 12 July, to return to Africa. She had left Liverpool with 22 crew members and suffered one crew death on the voyage.

=== 2nd enslaving voyage (1799–1800) ===
Captain Peers had sailed from Demerara on 12 July and purchased captives in Gambia. Goodrich arrived back at Demerara on 18 November 1799. There she landed 147 captives. She left Demerara on 17 January 1800 and arrived back at Liverpool on 3 March. She had left Demerara with 22 crew members and suffered 12 deaths on the voyage. Goodrich's master on her return was McGuire. It is not clear when he replaced Peers or why. He was one of her owners on her next voyage.

=== 3rd enslaving voyage (1800–1801) ===
Captain Archibald Galbraith sailed from Liverpool on 6 April 1800. (Note: Earlier, Galbraith had been captain of the slave ships Union, which a French squadron had captured before she could embark any slaves, and Chaser, which was condemned in West Africa on her first voyage before she could embark any enslaved people. The Liverpool merchant John Dawson was the owner of Chaser, and Union. Between 1783 and 1792, the firm of Peter Baker and John Dawson was the largest firm in the slave trade. Dawson was declared bankrupt in 1793, but afterwards returned to enslaving.) Goodrich gathered her captives at Gambia and arrived at Demerara on 21 July 1801, where she delivered 111 captives. Her owners sold her in the Americas. (Note: Galbraith went on to captain the Liverpool enslaving ship Bess.)

=== 4th enslaving voyage (1801–1802) ===
Captain John Singleton sailed from Liverpool on 21 September 1801. Goodrich acquired captives on the Gold Coast. She arrived at Demerara on 4 May 1802 with 114 captives. She sailed from Demerara on 20 October and arrived back at Liverpool on 4 December. She had left Liverpool with 15 crew men and she suffered four crew deaths on the voyage.

Goodrick or Goodrich first appeared in Lloyd's Register (LR) and the Register of Shipping (RS), respectively, in 1805.

Year	Master	Owner	Trade	Source
1805	J.Wilkie	Hume & Co.	Liverpool–Africa	LR
1805	Singleton	R.Hume	Liverpool–Africa	RS

=== 5th enslaving voyage (1804–1805) ===
Captain Gabriel Sinclair sailed from Liverpool on 19 August 1804. Goodrich acquired captives at Bassa (Note: The location of Bassa is uncertain. There are two settlements in Nigeria called Bassa, but both are inland. One possibility is Bassa Cove, named for the Bassa people, in modern Liberia.) and delivered 110 captives to Suriname on 2 January 1805. She sailed from Suriname on 17 March and arrived back at Liverpool on 11 June. She had left Liverpool with 20 crew members and she suffered five crew deaths on her voyage.

=== 6th enslaving voyage (1805–1806) ===
Captain James Wilkie sailed from Liverpool on 10 November 1805. Goodrich left Africa on 11 November and arrived at Saint Vincent on 7 January 1806. Goodrich sailed from Saint Vincent on 24 April. Wilkie died on 10 May, supposed drowned. Captain John Steel replaced Wilkie. Goodrich arrived back at Liverpool on 3 July. She had left Liverpool with 20 crew members and she lost one man on her voyage.

=== 7th enslaving voyage (1806–1807) ===
Captain James Willie sailed from Liverpool on 23 September 1806. Goodrich acquired captives at Bassa and arrived at Grenada on 22 March 1807. She sailed from Grenada on 18 April and arrived back at Liverpool on 15 June. She had left Liverpool with 19 crew members and she suffered two crew deaths on the voyage.

=== Post-slave trade ===
LR for 1808 showed Goodrick with W. Simes, master, Hume & Co., owners, and trade Liverpool−Montevideo.

Goodrich, of 91 tons (bm), entered the Guernsey registry in 1807. On 17 November 1807, Daniel Maillard received a protection, prior to embarking on a cruise. On 18 November, he acquired a letter of marque from Guernsey. It showed her owners as Peter Le Lacheur of Guernsey, Charles H. Hunt, John Cheeseborough, and Samuel Knipe of Liverpool. In 1808, Goodrich underwent alterations that resulted in the cancellation of her registration, and the issuance of a new registration. On 27 March 1808 she arrived at Madeira from Guernsey.

Then on 21 June 1808 Philip Nicole acquired a letter of marque. On 9 July Captain P. Nichol received a pass for Gibraltar.

== Fate ==
In June 1808 Antoine-Joseph Preira (aka Balidar), took command of Point du Jour, a lugger-rigged barge with a 34-man crew, armed with a 2-pounder gun and two swivel guns. He captured Goodrich, which he brought to Saint-Malo. Lloyd's List (LL) reported on 22 July 1808 that Goodrich, Nicolle, master, had been taken by a privateer while sailing from Guernsey to Gibraltar, but that some of her crew had been able to return to Guernsey. A report a month later stated that Goodrich had been taken into Rostoff.
