= Chaser (1786 ship) =

British merchant and whaling ship (1771–1796)

History

Great Britain
- Name: 1776: Lord North; 1782: Cotton Planter; 1784: Planter; 1786: Chaser
- Owner: Various
- Launched: 1771, Philadelphia
- Captured: 1794 (and recaptured)
- Fate: Condemned 1796

General characteristics
- Tons burthen: 200, 201, or 202 (bm)
- Armament: 1778: 4 × 4-pounder + 10 × 3-pounder guns; 1796: 10 × 6-pounder guns

Chaser (or Chacer) first appeared under that name in British records in 1786. She had been launched in 1771 at Philadelphia under another name, probably Lord North. Lord North became Cotton Planter, and then Planter, before she became Chaser. Between 1786 and 1790 Chaser made four voyages as a whaler in the British southern whale fishery. She then became a merchantman. In 1794 a privateer captured her but the Spanish recaptured her. She became a Liverpool-based Slave ship in the triangular trade in enslaved people. In 1796 she was condemned in West Africa on her first voyage in the triangular trade before she could embark any enslaved people.

== Lord North ==
Lord North first appeared in Lloyd's Register (LR), in 1776.

Year	Master	Owner	Trade	Source & notes
1776	Geo. Rose	T.Scott & Co.	London–Antigua	LR
1779	G.Rose; A.Kidd	T.Scott & Co.	London–Antigua	LR
1780	G.Rose; A.Kidd; W.Jordan	T.Scott & Co.	London–Antigua	LR
1781	W.Jordan; J.Young	Captain & Co.	London–Barbados	LR

== Cotton Planter ==
Lord North became Cotton Planter.

Year	Master	Owner	Trade	Source & notes
1782	J.Young	Chrighton & Co.	London–Tobago	LR

On 24 August 1782 a gale drove Cotton Planter, Young, master, onto safe ground at "Isle Varow Point", in the River Shannon.

Year	Master	Owner	Trade	Source & notes
1783	J.Young	Captain & Co.	London–Tobago	LR

== Planter ==
Cotton Planter became Planter.

Year	Master	Owner	Trade	Source & notes
1784	G.Grieve	Graham & Simpson	London–Georgia	LR; some repairs 1784
1786	G.Grieve	Graham & Co. Simpson & Co.	London–Georgia	LR; some repairs 1784

== Chaser ==
Planter became Chaser. Chaser first appeared in Lloyd's Register (LR), in 1786.

Year	Master	Owner	Trade	Source & notes
1786	S.Skiff	Stephens & Co.	London-Southern Fishery	LR; some repairs 1784

1st whaling voyage (1786–1787): Captain Stephen Skiff sailed for the Brazil Banks in 1786. On 1 April 1787 Chaser, Skiff, master, was at Island Trinidada with four tuns of spermaceti and 40 tuns of whale oil. She returned to England on 2 July 1787 with five tuns of sperm oil, 70 tuns of whale oil, and 42 cwt of whale bone.

Year	Master	Owner	Trade	Source & notes
1787	S.Skiff; W. Blanchford	Stephens & Co.	London-Southern Fishery	LR; some repairs 1784, & raised and repaired 1787

2nd whaling voyage (1787–1788): Captain C. Blandford sailed from England on 17 September 1787. Chaser returned on 27 June 1788 with 20 tuns of sperm oil, 80 tuns of whale oil, and 70 cwt of whale bone.

3rd whaling voyage (1788–1789): Captain C. Blanchford sailed from England on 6 September 1788. Chaser returned on 21 July 1789 with 25 tuns of sperm oil, 70 tuns of whale oil, and 58 cwt of whale bone.

4th whaling voyage (1789–1790): Captain Blanchford (or Blackford) sailed from England on 24 September 1789. Chaser returned on 8 December 1790.

Year	Master	Owner	Trade	Source & notes
1791	Blanchard; R.T.Funter	Murry & Co.	London–Southern Fishery	LR; repaired 1784, raised and repaired 1787, & good repair 1789
1794	R.T.Funter; G.King	Murry & Co.	London–Southern Fishery; London–Monserrat	LR; repaired 1784, raised and repaired 1787, & good repair 1789

Although Lloyd's Register showed Chaser as continuing in the southern fishery, and one source accepts this information, there is no evidence in Lloyds List's ship arrival and departure data to support it. On 4 March 1791 Lloyd's List showed Chacer, Funter, master, sailing from Deal to Africa. Within the month it reported that she had arrived at Dunkirk. There were no further mentions of Chacer until June 1794.

In June 1794 Chacer, King, master, sailed to Martinique. From there she sailed on to Jamaica. Lloyd's List reported in January 1795 that the French privateer Libertie had taken Chacer and Dorset, Edmonds, late master. (Note: The captor may have been the corvette Liberté, of sixteen 4-pounder guns that had been commissioned as a privateer in February 1794 at Bordeaux. She was sold at Guadeloupe in June, and recommissioned there in July as a privateer. The French Navy requisitioned her in early 1795. HMS Alarm sank Liberté on 5 May 1795, off Puerto Rico.) (Note: Dorset, of 274 tons (bm), had been launched at Bristol in 1794. In the engagement Edmonds, her master, had been killed, and two men had been wounded.) However, a Spanish frigate had retaken the two British vessels and taken them into Havana.

Year	Master	Owner	Trade	Source & notes
1795	G.King; A.Galbraith	Bridgeman; Dawson & Co.	London–Martinique	LR; repaired 1784, raised and repaired 1787, & good repair 1789

Chaser, Galbraith, master, sailed from Havana on 13 May 1795, in company with Sarah, M'Gee, master, and Amacree, Hewan, master. (Note: Earlier, Galbraith had been captain of the slave ship Brothers, which the French-American privateer Brutus, from Charleston, had captured in mid-March at Cape San Antonio, Cuba. Brutus sold Brothers to a Spaniard, who took her into Havana.) Both Sarah and Amacree had delivered enslaved people to Havana and were on their way home. Sarah separated from Chaser on the 20th through the Gulf of Mexico, and from Amacree on the 29th, north of Bermuda. Lloyd's List reported in July 1795 that Chaser had returned to Liverpool.

Year	Master	Owner	Trade	Source & notes
1796	A.Galbraith	Dawson & Co.	Liverpool–Africa	LR; repaired 1784, raised and repaired 1787, good repair 1789, & repairs 1789

== Fate ==
Owner John Dawson next intended to sail Chaser in the trade in enslaved people. Captain Galbraith sailed from Liverpool on 20 November 1795. Lloyd's List reported in February 1796 that she had returned to Liverpool from westward of Newfoundland.

In 1796, 103 vessels sailed from British ports, bound for Africa in the slave trade; 94 of the vessels sailed from Liverpool.

From Liverpool Chacer sailed to Cork. Then on 15 April 1796 she was at Iles de Los. She had been on shore and sustained much damage; her cargo had been landed.

Chaser was condemned at Iles de Los before embarking any captives.

In 1796, 22 vessels were lost while sailing in the slave trade. Five vessels were lost on the coast of Africa. Chaser is not listed among these. Still, during the period 1793 to 1807, war, rather than maritime hazards or resistance by the captives, was the greatest cause of vessel losses among British vessels in the slave trade.

After Chaser, Galbraith went on to be captain of Union, which the French also captured, and then Goodrich on the third of her seven voyages transporting enslaved people. The Liverpool merchant John Dawson was the or an owner of Brothers, Chaser, and Union. (Note: Between 1783 and 1792, the firm of Peter Baker and John Dawson was the largest firm in Great Britain in the slave trade. Dawson went bankrupt in 1793, but afterwards returned to the slave trade.)
