= Orange Grove (1790 ship) =

British slave ship and merchantman (1790–1794)

History

Great Britain
- Name: Orange Grove
- Owner: J.Dawson & Co.
- Launched: 1790, Liverpool
- Captured: 1794

General characteristics
- Tons burthen: 140

Orange Grove was launched in 1790 at Liverpool. She made two complete voyages as a slave ship in the triangular trade in enslaved people. She became a West Indiaman, but the French Navy captured her in 1794.

== Career ==
Orange Grove first appeared in Lloyd's Register (LR) in 1790.

Year	Master	Owner	Trade	Source
1790	A.Irvin	J.Dawson & Co.	Liverpool−Africa	LR

1st voyage transporting enslaved people (1790–1791): Captain Andrew Irving sailed from Liverpool on 27 November 1790. (Note: Irving had arrived at Liverpool in July as captain of another Dawson vessel, Young Hero) He started acquiring captives on 7 February 1791, first at some unknown port in the Bight of Benin, and then at Lagos, Onim. Irwin died on 2 March 1791. Orange Grove sailed from Africa on 28 May. She was under the command of Captain John K. Williams when she arrived in the West Indies. She arrived at Cartagena, Colombia on 29 July with 230 captives. She landed some there and then sailed on to Havana where she landed the rest. She sailed for Liverpool on 24 October and arrived back at Liverpool on 8 December. She was an Irwing's command when she arrived at Liverpool from Savannah. She had left Liverpool with 16 crew members and had suffered two crew deaths on her voyage.

2nd voyage transporting enslaved people (1792–1793): Captain William Carrol sailed from Liverpool on 25 February 1792. Captain Carrol died on 5 August. Orange Grove arrived at Kingston, Jamaica on 28 December with 236 captives. She left Kingston on 1 February 1793 and arrived back at Liverpool on 30 March. She was under Captain William Lawson's command when she stopped at Beaumaris on her way home. She had left Liverpool with 25 crew members and she had suffered three crew deaths on her voyage.

Orange Grove made no more voyages transporting enslaved people. Instead, she sailed as a West Indiaman, i.e., directly between Great Britain ad the West Indies.

Year	Master	Owner	Trade	Source
1795	Robinson	J.Dawson & Co.	Liverpool−Barbados	LR

== Fate ==
Lloyd's List reported in September 1794 that a French squadron on its way to Guadeloupe had captured Orange Grove, Henderson, master, and that it was believed that the French had taken her there with them.
