= Mosley Hill (1782 ship) =

Liverpool slave ship (1782–1790

History

Great Britain
- Name: Mosley Hill
- Namesake: Mossley Hill
- Owner: Peter Baker & John Dawson (Note: At the time, Baker and Dawson were the largest firm of slave traders in England.)
- Launched: 1782, Liverpool
- Fate: Lost; last listed 1790

General characteristics
- Tons burthen: 376, or 400 (bm)
- Length: 104 ft 8 in (31.9 m)
- Beam: 29 ft 3 in (8.9 m)
- Armament: 20 × 9-pounder guns
- Notes: Two decks & three masts

Mosley Hill (or Mosely Hill, or Moseley Hill, or Mossley Hill), was launched in 1782 at Liverpool as a slave ship. Between 1782 and 1790 she made eight complete voyages in the triangular trade in enslaved people. For the voyages between 1785 and 1789, she sailed under an asiento that gave her a right to bring and sell captives in Spanish territories. She was last listed in 1790; reportedly she had been lost.

== Career ==
Mosely Hill first appeared in Lloyd's Register (LR) in 1782.

Year	Master	Owner	Trade	Source
1782	J.Gibbons	Baker & Co.	Liverpool–Africa	LR

1st voyage transporting enslaved people (1782–1783): Captain John Hewan sailed from Liverpool on 9 June 1782. He acquired captives at Bonny, and Mosley Hill arrived at Tortola on 18 October with 730 captives. She sailed from there on 30 November, and arrived back at Liverpool on 10 January 1783. She had left Liverpool with 76 crew members and she had suffered six crew deaths on her voyage.

In October Lloyd's List reported that an outward-bound French Indiaman had arrived at Tortola. She was a prize to Mosely, Hill, master, which had captured the Indiaman while sailing from Liverpool to Africa.

Another source reports that Moseley Hill, Ewing, master had captured a Toulon East Indiaman, put a prize crew on board, and sent her into Tortola. Moseley Hill arrived after the prize with 723 captives. The same source reports that during the war she was the only enslaving ship to visit Bonny.

2nd voyage transporting enslaved people (1783): Captain Hewan sailed from Liverpool on 1 March 1783. He arrived at Kingston, Jamaica with 794 captives on 3 October. Mosley Hill left Kingston on 4 November and arrived back at Liverpool on 24 December. She had left Liverpool with 65 crew members and had suffered five crew deaths on her voyage.

3rd voyage transporting enslaved people (1784): Captain Hewan sailed from Liverpool on 7 May 1784. He acquired captives at Bonny and arrived at Trinidad on 8 October with 587 captives. Mosley Hill arrived back at Liverpool on 30 November. She had left Liverpool with 51 crew members and had suffered five crew deaths on her voyage.

4th voyage transporting enslaved people (1785): Captain Hewan sailed from Liverpool on 15 January 1785. Mosley Hill acquired captives at Bonny and arrived at Havana in June with 404 captives. She arrived back at Liverpool on 11 August. She had left Liverpool with 51 crew members and had suffered six crew deaths on her voyage.

Mosley Hill's owners, Baker and Dawson, had received an asiento that gave them a right to bring and sell captives in Spanish territories.

5th voyage transporting enslaved people (1785–1786): Captain Joseph Fayrer sailed from Liverpool on 9 September 1785. Mosley Hill acquired captives at Bonny and arrived at Trinidad in May 1786 with 650 captives. She arrived back at Liverpool on 31 July. She had left Liverpool with 47 crew members and had suffered seven crew deaths on her voyage.

6th voyage transporting enslaved people (1786–1787): Captain Joseph Fayrer sailed from Liverpool on 21 September 1786. Mosley Hill acquired captives at Bonny and arrived at La Guaira on 15 April 1786 with 674 captives. Mosley Hill had embarked 736 captives at Bonny, and she delivered eight captives to Havana. One may infer that the mortality rate among the slaves in the Middle Passage between Bonny and Havana was 7%. Mosley Hill arrived back at Liverpool on 22 June. She had left Liverpool with 51 crew members and had suffered three crew deaths on her voyage.

Captain Fayrer reported seeing, on 4 June 1787, at 45°00′N 46°59′W, some huge icebergs.

7th voyage transporting enslaved people (1787–1788): Captain John Simmons sailed from Liverpool on 19 August 1787. Mosley Hill acquired captives at Bonny and arrived at Havana in April 1788 with 504 captives. She arrived back at Liverpool on 2 September. She had left Liverpool with 52 crew members and had suffered seven crew deaths on her voyage.

The Slave Trade Act 1788 (Dolben's Act) limited the number of enslaved people that British slave ships could transport without penalty, based on the ships' tons burthen. It was the first British legislation passed to regulate slave shipping. At a burthen of 400 tons, the cap would have been 539 captives.

8th voyage transporting enslaved people (1788–1790): Captain Joseph Fayrer sailed from Liverpool on 10 October 1788. He acquired captives in the Bight of Benin. Mosley Hill arrived at La Guaira 17 May 1789 with 453 captives, by one account all of whom she landed. On 28 February 1789 the Spanish had liberalized the slave trade, with the result that Baker and Dawson's asiento had ended. The Intendente of Caracas, Juan Gillelmi, confirmed to Fayrer and the owners' representative at Caracas that as Mosley Hill had left Europe before the end of the asiento, the terms of their asiento would still hold. However, the local landowners in La Guaira could not offer terms acceptable to Fayrer and so he decided to take his captives to Havana. Mosley Hill arrived back at Liverpool on 13 January 1790. She had left Liverpool with 44 crew members and had suffered 12 crew deaths on her voyage. On her way back to Liverpool she had put into Galway leaky.

== Fate ==
Mosley Hill was last listed in Lloyd's Register in 1790. By one report she had been lost and her certificate of registry had been given up.
