= Mentor (1778 ship) =

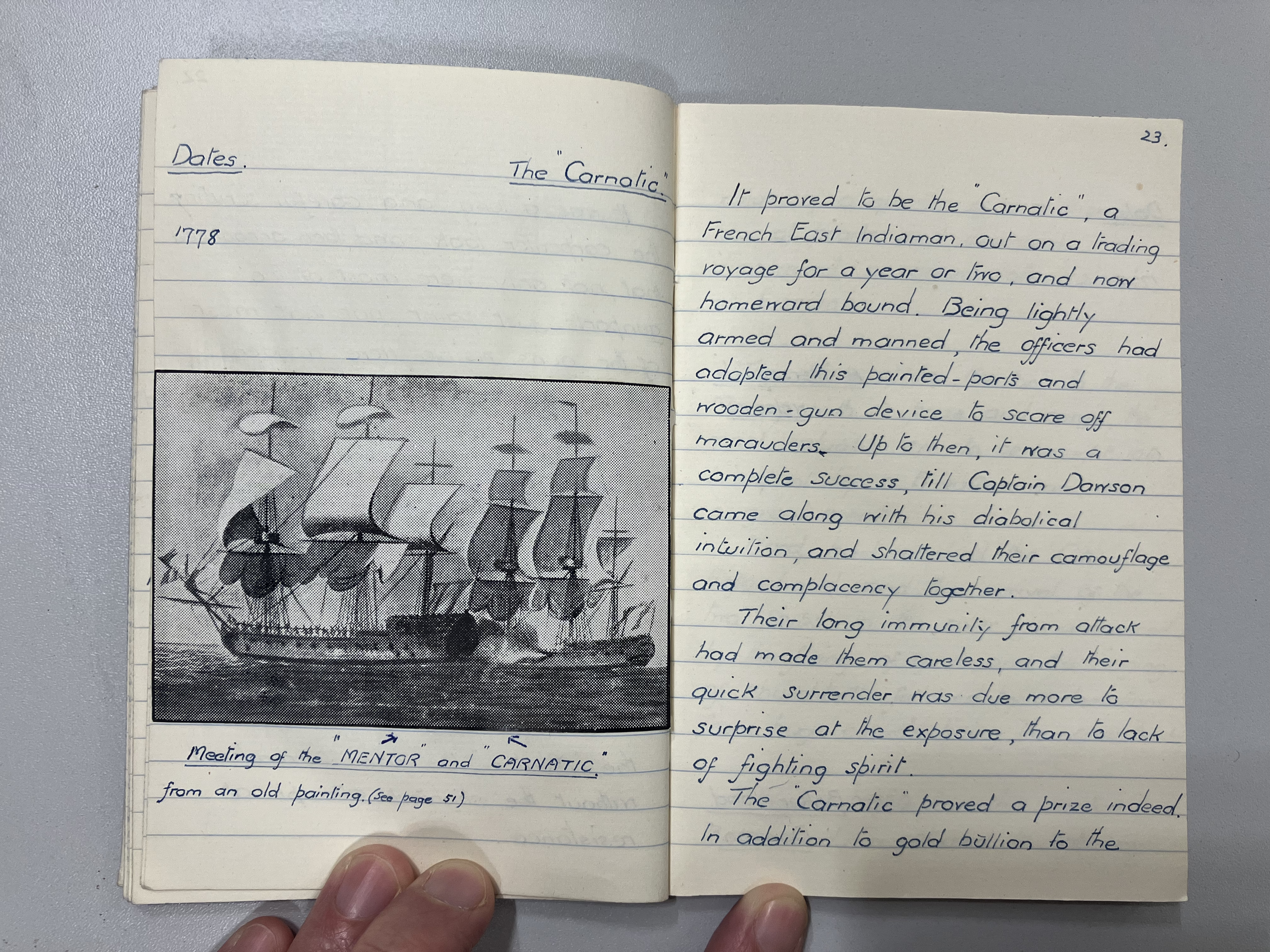
- Newspaper photograph copied into A Liverpool Family: Three Generations of Liverpool Shipbuilders (H.S. Phillips, 1953). The original oil painting was lost in the destruction of the Liverpool Museum authorities' Ship Models room during World War II.

History

Great Britain
- Name: Mentor
- Owner: Peter Baker
- Launched: 1778, Chester
- Fate: Wrecked 1782

General characteristics
- Tons burthen: 400, or 500 (bm)
- Complement: 1778: 102; 1782: 34
- Armament: 1778: 20 × 6-pounder guns, or 24 guns; 1779: 20 × 12-pounder + 8 × 4-pounder guns

Mentor was launched in 1778 at Chester as a West Indiaman. She captured three vessels, including a valuable East Indiaman belonging to the French East India Company. She had an inconclusive single ship action with a French warship in 1779. She was wrecked in 1782.

== Career ==
Mentor first appeared in Lloyd's Register (LR) in the volume for 1778.

Year	Master	Owner	Trade	Source
1778	J.Dawson	P.Baker & Co.	Liverpool–Jamaica	LR

The British Admiralty gave notice in April 1777, that they were ready to issue letters of marque for privateers against the Americans. In March 1778, Great Britain broke off relations with France. War between Britain and France had broken out in April 1778. Captain John Dawson acquired a letter of marque on 1 September 1778.

=== Capture of The Carnatic ===
Along with owner Peter Baker and ship's carpenter John Baxter, Dawson sailed Mentor south in a privateering cruise to attempt to intercept French vessels coming from the Indian Ocean that were not aware of the outbreak of hostilities. On 28 October 1778 Mentor encountered the French East Indiaman Carnatic, which was sailing from India to France.

Dawson was initially hesitant to pursue the Carnatic, which on first impression vastly outgunned Mentor 74 to 28. Continuing to surveil, however, Dawson suspected that many gun ports were simply painted on. Passing his telescope to Baxter, after some scrutiny, Baxter confirmed the suspicion per his own judgement, and that many of the guns were wooden dummies meant to camouflage Carnatic. The crew of Mentor captured Carnatic with almost no resistance, to the surprise of the crew on Mentor.

When Carnatic came into Liverpool, she was said to be carrying a box of diamonds and pearls worth £135,000 and a total value worth £400,000 to £500,000 after additional bullion and jewels. This made Carnatic the richest prize ever taken and brought safe into port by a Liverpool privateer. Baker, Mentor's owner, retained ownership of Carnatic afterward. Prize money was paid on 1 November 1779. (Note: Baker and Dawkins purchased the Mossley Hill Estate. In 1782 they launched a new slave ship that they named Mosley Hill.)

=== Later missions and end ===
Year	Master	Owner	Trade	Source
1779	J.Dawson; J.Whiteside	P.Baker & Co.	Liverpool–Jamaica	LR

On 26 October 1779 Mentor, John Whiteside, master, was in 44°N 11°W when she sighted four vessels, and sailed towards them. There were two ships, one flying Dutch colours and the other English, a sloop, and a schooner. As Mentor came closer Whiteside saw that one of the ships was a frigate, and sailed away. The frigate raised French colours, fired some shots, and set off in chase. The chase continued, off-and-on until 29 October, when she caught up with Mentor. At one p.m., an engagement commenced. Then at 2:10 p.m. the frigate broke off the action and sailed away. The frigate was armed with 36 guns, twenty-eight of them 12-pounders on one deck.

Late in the afternoon two privateers from Bristol, Lyon and Tyger, came up and together with Mentor they set off after the French vessel, but without consulting with Whiteside. Mentor, because of the damage to her masts, sails, and rigging, could not fully keep up. By mid-day the next day the three caught up with the frigate, and a brig. The frigate was disguised as a merchantman, as she had been when Mentor first saw her some days earlier. Lyon set off after the brig, and Tyger sailed towards the frigate, but when she got closer and realized the deception, broke off and joined Lyon.

Mentor could not keep up and sailed for Ireland. She put into Cork to refit.

A gale in the night between 1 and 2 August 1781 at Jamaica drove Mentor and a number of other vessels, including Carnatic, Gibbons, master, on shore. Although the initial expectation was that she and most of the other vessels that also were driven on shore would be gotten off, the next report had Carnatic and numerous other vessels totally lost; it was hoped that some cargo could be saved. Mentor, however, survived.

== Loss ==
During the 1782 Central Atlantic hurricane in September 1782, Mentor foundered in the Grand Banks of Newfoundland with the loss of 31 of her 34 crew. Sarah rescued the three survivors: Captain Whiteside, his second mate, and a boy. Mentor had been sailing from Jamaica to Liverpool, Lancashire.
