= James Irving (slave trader) =

Scottish slave trader (1759–1791)

James Irving (15 December 1759 – 24 December 1791) was a Scottish slave trader, sea captain and surgeon. In 1789, Irving was captured and enslaved himself. After he was freed, Irving returned to slave trading as a career and died on his next slaving voyage.

== Early life ==
James Irving was the third child of John Irving (c. 1731–1787), a blacksmith and innkeeper in the Scottish border town Langholm, by his wife, Isobel, née Little (c. 1725–1791). He was born at Langholm on 15 December 1759. In the 1780s he moved to Liverpool with his cousin.

== Surgeon ==
In January 1782, Irving was working as a surgeon on Prosperity, a British slave ship owned by John Dawson.

== Captain ==
Dawson went on to give Irving his first captaincy on Anna, a slave ship that was registered in Liverpool in April 1789. (Note: Anna was a small schooner of 50 tons (bm), launched at Liverpool in 1789.)

== Enslavement ==
In 1789, Anna became shipwrecked off the coast of Africa while travelling to collect captives. Irving and its crew were themselves captured and enslaved. He wrote to a British vice-consul, John Hutchinson, pleading for his release. He said we are "in the hands of Arabs and Moors in a Condition miserable beyond Conception’. And later in his correspondence "rescue us speedily from the most intollerable Slavery".

He also wrote:

"O I hope you can feel for us, first Suffering shipwreck, then seized on by a party of Arabs with outstretched Arms and Knives ready to stab us, next stripped to the skin, suffering a Thousand Deaths daily, insulted, spit upon, exposed to the Sun and Night Dews".

After 14 months of enslavement Irving was released, the exact circumstances of the release are unknown. Irving along with 10 other crew from Anna were handed over to Hutchinson and set sail to return to England.

== Death ==
Irving arrived back in England in October 1790. In December 1790, he had become the captain of another of Dawson's slave ships, Ellen, which set sail for Africa on 3 January 1801 from Liverpool. She started acquiring captives on 4 April, first at Cape Coast Castle, and then at Anomabu. She sailed from Africa on 16 September. The ship's log records Irving's death on 24 December 1791 but does not indicate how he died. James Baillie, her third mate, but by then the ranking officer, replaced Irving as master, and Ellen arrived at Trinidad and Tobago on 11 January 1792. She had embarked 253 enslaved people and she arrived with 206. The loss of 47 captives represented a 19% mortality rate. Ellen sailed for Liverpool on 30 March and arrived home on 15 May. She had left Liverpool with 16 crew members and had suffered six crew deaths (including Irving), on her voyage.

Schwarz writes that Irving had likely been too sickly after his own enslavement to survive the rigors of the trip.

== Letters of Irving ==
Irving sent a series of letters to his wife Mary that have been recorded. The letters, intended only for private consumption, offer a unique account of life aboard slave ships in the 18th century.
