= Ann (1805 ship) =

History

United States
- Launched: 1800, America
- Fate: Transferred to UK in 1805

United Kingdom
- Name: Ann
- Acquired: 1805
- Captured: (1):21 April 1813; (2):16 May 1813; (3):23 May 1813
- Notes: One source confuses Ann with Ann.

General characteristics
- Tons burthen: 175, or 180 (bm)
- Sail plan: Brig
- Armament: 1808: 8 × 4-pounder guns; 1813:6 or 10 guns

Ann was launched in America in 1800, possibly under another name. She transferred to the United Kingdom in 1805. Between 1810 and 1813 she became a temporary packet operating out of Falmouth, Cornwall for the Post Office Packet Service. American privateers twice captured her in 1813 in single ship actions.

== Career ==
Ann first appeared in Lloyd's Register (LR) in 1805.

Year	Master	Owner	Trade	Source
1805	J.Harland	O'Leary	London-Shields	LR
1806	J.Harland	O'Leary	London-Shields	LR
1807	J.Harland; Prit_on	O'Leary; Britton	London–Shields; Malta	LR
1808	Britten; Arties	P.Britten	London–Malta	LR
1809	Arties; Britton	Hunter & Co.	London–Stockholm	LR
1810	Small; J.Britton	Hunter & Co.	London–Malta	LR

Packet The Post Office in 1810 took on Ann as a temporary packet. Her first captain was John Britton, whose appointment date was 6 August 1810.

On 12 January 1811 Ann came into Plymouth. She had been returning from Cadiz when she had had to repel an attack by a French privateer.

Ann, Britton, master, sailed from Falmouth on 9 March and arrived in Bermuda on 16 April. She sailed form Bermuda on 21 April and arrived in New York on 29 April

While Ann was in New York and observed vessels coming from Ireland, Liverpool, and Bristol with passengers, mostly "emigrant mechanics". These men could, 24 hours after arriving, acquire certificates of American citizenship. However, many found it difficult to find work. Many then joined the US Navy. Britton visited the USS President where he identified several who were British, including some who were Cornishmen that had not rejoined their packets in time. Although he believed that they would be glad to desert and come to Ann, he did not take them as he was afraid that the Americans would accuse him of "harbouring their seamen." Two Englishmen did jump from President to swim to Ann; one was believed to have drowned and the other succeeded in reaching her. Ann took him aboard and back to England. The seaman testified on his return that he had been a quarter-gunner aboard President for the Little Belt affair. Man further testified that out of President's crew of some 500 men, some 300 were English, Scots, or Irish, and that President had fired the first shot in the affair. The man was impressed into HMS Experiment, then serving as a guardship at Falmouth.

On 8 June Ann sailed from New York and on the 17th she arrived at Halifax, Nova Scotia. She left Halifax on 30 June and arrived back at Falmouth on 21 July. (Note: One source states that Captain Peter Pell Snell was appointed to replace Britton on 2 December 1811, though it is not clear that he ever did so as Britton continued as her master well into 1813.)

== Fate ==
Ann, Captain Peter Hill (acting), sailed from Falmouth on 12 April 1813, bound for the Leeward Islands and Jamaica. The American privateer Yorktown, of 380 tons (bm), 16 guns, and 180 men, captured Ann off the Western Isles on 21 April after an action of two hours. In the engagement Ann had one man killed and three wounded. The Americans kept Captain Hill, the surgeon, and the steward, and put the rest of the crew aboard a "licensed" American vessel, bound for Lisbon. There the packet Duke of Marlborough took them on and brought them back to Falmouth.

On 16 May HMS Hogue recaptured Ann near Sandy Hook and sent her to Halifax, Nova Scotia. However, on 23 May 1813 the American privateer Young Teazer again captured Ann. She had a prize crew of a midshipman and some 15 sailors aboard who resisted until they had suffered two men lightly wounded and had their rigging and sails shot up. The action and chase had lasted from 8am to 7pm. Young Teazer sent Ann into Young Teazer's home port of Portland, Maine. (Note: Lloyd's List misidentified the captor as Teazer, and Ann's destination as Portsmouth, New Hampshire. However, the Royal Navy had destroyed Teazer in January. Hogue was present when Young Teazer's mate blew her up in June.)

Niles' Weekly Register reported on 5 June 1813, that Young Teazer had sent the "packet Ann, of 10 guns", a valuable prize, into Portland.
