= Ann (1801 Fowey ship) =

History

United Kingdom
- Name: Ann
- Builder: Fowey
- Launched: 1801
- Notes: At least one source confuses this Ann with the Falmouth packet Ann

General characteristics
- Tons burthen: 123 (bm)
- Sail plan: Brig
- Armament: 2 × 4-pounder guns + 4 × 6-pounder carronades (1815)

Ann was launched at Fowey in 1801. She did not appear in the registers before 1808, though there were mentions of her in ship arrival and departure data before that. She traded widely and was effectively last listed in 1815.

== Career ==
Ann first appeared in Lloyd's Register (LR) in the volume for 1808, and in the Register of Shipping (RS) in 1809.

Year	Master	Owner	Trade	Source
1808, 1809, & 1810	T. or J.Ball	Captain & Co.	London–Malta	LR & RS
1811	T.Ball	Ball & Co.	Liverpool–Cork; London–Mogador	LR
1812	T.Ball; M.M'Leod	Ball & Co.	London–Gibraltar	LR
1813	M.M'Leod	Ball & Co.	London–Gibraltar	LR
1814	M'Cleod; H.Doran	Captain & Co.	London–Limerick; Liverpool–Quebec	RS
1815	H.Doran	M'Cleod	Liverpool–Lubeck	RS

== Fate ==
Ann was last listed in LR in 1815, and in RS in 1822, with data stale since 1815. She was last surveyed in 1814.
