= Princess Royal (1783 ship) =

History

Great Britain
- Name: Princess Royal
- Owner: Peter Baker & John Dawson, Liverpool merchants
- Builder: Liverpool
- Launched: 15 August 1783
- Fate: Condemned 1789 after grounding

General characteristics
- Tons burthen: 596, or 600 (bm)
- Length: 127 ft 0 in (38.7 m)
- Beam: 33 ft 6 in (10.2 m) (above the wales)
- Depth of hold: 6 ft 0 in (1.8 m)
- Sail plan: Full-rigged ship
- Complement: 47, or 83
- Armament: 10 × 9-pounder guns
- Notes: Frigate-built ship of two decks and three masts; coppered in 1783

Princess Royal was a large, frigate-built ship launched at Liverpool in 1783. She made four voyages as a slave ship in the triangular trade in enslaved people before she grounded in 1789 and was condemned.

== Career ==
Princess Royal entered Lloyd's Register in 1783 with J. Forbes, master. However, Captain William Sherwood was Princess Royal's master for the entirety of her career as a slaver. In a list of leading slave captains over the period 1785–1807, he placed fifth. He made 12 enslaving voyages for four owners, and in six vessels.

Sherwood made four voyages in Princess Royal in which he acquired captives primarily at the Bight of Biafra and Gulf of Guinea islands and took them to Havana.

1st voyage transporting enslaved people (1785): Sherwood sailed from Liverpool on 27 March 1785. He acquired captives at Bonny Island and delivered 480 to Havana in October. Princess Royal had started the voyage with 50 crew men, 13 of whom died on the voyage. She arrived back at Liverpool on 1 December.

On her way, between Bonny and Princes Island, she had spoken Doe, Sutton, master.

2nd voyage transporting enslaved people (1786): Sherwood sailed from Liverpool on 20 March 1786. He again gathered his captives at Bonny and delivered 700 to Havana in October. Nine of Princess Royal's 52 crew members died on the voyage. She left Havana on 28 October and arrived at Liverpool on 9 December.

3rd voyage transporting enslaved people (1787): Sherwood sailed from Liverpool on 14 April 1787 and arrived at Bonny on 29 May. Princess Royal arrived at Havana on 27 September, where she landed 731 captives. Of her crew of 54 men, eight died on the voyage. She arrived back at Liverpool on 21 December.

The Slave Trade Act 1788 (Dolben's Act) limited the number of enslaved people that British enslaving ships could transport without penalty, based on a ship's burthen. At a burthen of 600 tons, the cap for Princess Royal would have been 739 captives. The Act was the first British legislation passed to regulate slave shipping.

3rd voyage transporting enslaved people (1788–1789): Sherwood sailed from Liverpool on 10 April 1788 and arrived at Havana in September. He had embarked 771 captives, and landed 706, for a loss rate of 8.4%. Lloyd's List had reported that on 28 August 1788 Princess Royal had arrived at Trinidad with about 800 captives for Havana. Eight of Princess Royal's 67 crew members died on the voyage. She sailed from Havana on 27 November, and arrived at Liverpool on 22 January 1789.

== Fate ==
As Princess Royal returned from Havana a heavy gale on 24 January 1789, drove her from her moorings on to the shore, where she filled with water. She was surveyed and condemned.
