= Brothers (1782 ship) =

British slave ships (1782–1795)

History

Great Britain
- Name: Brothers
- Launched: 1782, Liverpool
- Captured: April 1795

General characteristics
- Tons burthen: Originally: 110, or 119 (bm); 1790: 130 or 131

Brothers was launched in 1782 at Liverpool as a Guineaman. She made seven complete voyages as a slave ship in the triangular trade in enslaved people. A French privateer captured her in 1795, on her eighth voyage after she had embarked her captives. In a highly unusual move, the privateer sold Brothers and the captives she was carrying to the master of a Spanish vessel that the privateer had captured. The purchaser then took Brothers into Havana.

== Career ==
Brothers first appeared in Lloyd's Register (LR), in the issue for 1783.

Year	Master	Owner	Trade	Source
1783	R.Kendal	Kewley & Co.	Liverpool–Africa	LR

1st voyage transporting enslaved people (1783–1784): Captain Robert Kendall sailed from Liverpool on 18 April 1783. He acquired captives in the Sierra Leone estuary. On 1 January 1784 Brothers was reported on the coast of Africa, together with several other slave ships, including Bloom. Brothers arrived at Grenada on 2 April 1784 with 180 captives, and landed 179. She sailed from Grenada on 11 May and arrived back at Liverpool on 14 June. She had left Liverpool with 23 crew member and had suffered eight crew deaths on her voyage.

2nd voyage transporting enslaved people (1784–1785): Captain Kendall sailed from Liverpool on 28 July 1784. He acquired captives in the Sierra Leone estuary. Brothers arrived at Grenada on 9 March 1785 with 253 captives and landed 248. She sailed from Grenada on 29 March and arrived back at Liverpool on 17 May. She had left Liverpool with 27 crew members and had suffered one crew death on her voyage.

3rd voyage transporting enslaved people (1785–1786): Captain Joshua Pugmor (or Pugmore), sailed from Liverpool on 29 June 1785. Pugmore died on 1 October 1785. Captain Joseph Clarke replaced Pugmore. Brothers acquired captives at Cape Mount. Brothers, late Pugmore, master, was reported to have been there on 2 December with 207 captives. Brothers arrived at Dominica on 18 April 1786 with 220 captives. She arrived back at Liverpool on 29 June. She had left Liverpool with 26 crew members and had suffered five crew deaths on her voyage.

4th voyage transporting enslaved people (1786–1788): Captain Richard Kendall sailed from Liverpool on 27 August 1786. He acquired captives in the Sierra Leone estuary. Brothers arrived at Barbados on 9 February 1788 with 230 captives. She sailed from Barbados on 6 March and arrived back at Liverpool on 12 April. When she arrived her master was again Joseph Clark. It is not clear when the substitution occurred. She had left Liverpool with 27 crew members and had suffered seven crew deaths on her voyage.

5th voyage transporting enslaved people (1788–1789): Captain Joseph Clark sailed from Liverpool on 14 September 1789. He acquired captives in the Sierra Leone estuary. Brothers arrived at Grenada on 5 June 1789 with 188 captives. (Note: Brothers had sailed after the passage of the Slave Trade Act 1788 (Dolben's Act), which permitted her to carry without penalty only up to 184 or 199 captives (depending on what burthen measurement was used for the calculation). On three of her four prior voyages Brothers had carried more than 200 captives.) She arrived back at Liverpool on 18 September. She had left with 23 crew members and had suffered three crew deaths on her voyage.

6th voyage transporting enslaved people (1790–1792): Captain Alexander Finley sailed from Liverpool on 14 November 1790. He started acquiring captives at Cape Mount on 1 January 1791. Brothers sailed from Africa on 3 August and arrived at Montego Bay on 25 September. She had embarked 211 captives and arrived with 209, for a mortality rate of 1%. (Note: Dolben's Act mandated a bonus of £100 to captains who achieved a mortality of under 2% on a voyage.) (Note: Brothers may have undergone lengthening in 1790 as her burthen now was reported as 130-131 tons. This gave her a cap of 217 captives.) She arrived back at Liverpool on 16 January 1792. She had left with 17 crew members and had suffered three crew deaths on her voyage.

The Liverpool merchant John Dawson became co-owner of Brothers with Thomas Clarke. (Note: Between 1783 and 1792, the firm of Peter Baker and John Dawson was the largest firm in Great Britain in the slave trade. Dawson went bankrupt in 1793, but afterwards returned to the trade in enslaved people.)

7th voyage transporting enslaved people (1792–1793): Captain Thomas Payne sailed from Liverpool on 6 May 1792. (Note: Captain Payne was a leading captain of slave ships. Between 1792 and 1804 he made nine voyages in five ships, for three owners.) He started acquiring captives on 13 June at Iles de Los. He then went on to Cape Mount. Brothers sailed from Africa on 22 April and arrived at Montego Bay on 29 May. She had embarked 214 captives and she arrived with 212, for a mortality rate of 1%. She arrived back at Liverpool on 28 September. She had left Liverpool with 31 crew members and had suffered five crew deaths on her voyage.

8th voyage transporting enslaved people (1794–loss): In May 1795, Captain Archibald Galbraith sailed from Liverpool. At end-April 1795 Lloyd's List reported that Brothers, Galbraith, master, had arrived at Grenada from Africa.

== Fate ==
=== Initial report ===
The French privateer Brutus, from Charleston, captured Brothers in mid-March 1795 at Cape San Antonio, Cuba, as Brothers was on her way to Havana. Brutus sold Brothers to a Spaniard, who took her into Havana. (Note: Between 1793 and 1796, Charleston hosted numerous privateers built in the United States, equipped at Charleston, and sailing under French letters of marque. This involved a certain amount of subterfuge on the part of American owners and crew to avoid the restrictions of the Neutrality Act of 1794. For an example of a British merchant vessel that fell prey to such a Franco-American privateer, see Grenada Packet.)

=== Fuller story ===
Captain Ignacio Pica outfitted Nuestra Señora del Carmen with goods and provisions for a slaving expedition in 1794. (Note: Nuestra Señora del Carmen was a polacre, by some records sailing from Barcelona.) While sailing in the Caribbean, she encountered the French privateer Brutus, Jean Gariscan, master, in April 1795. (Note: Brutus had been launched in New York as Pulaski, and had become Pichgeru. She arrived at Charleston on 24 November 1794 and was immediately sold. By 8 April 1795 Pichgeru had returned to Charleston and was sailing under the name Brutus Francaise, or simply Brutus.)

Captain Pica, realizing that Brutus was more powerful than Nuestra Señora del Carmen, immediately surrendered. Brutus took her captive under tow and sailed back towards Charleston.

Five days later, Brutus encountered Brothers. (Note: Spanish records name Brothers Dos hermanos, or Two Brothers.) Galbraith resisted Brutus, but eventually was forced to strike after Brothers had suffered structural damage, had lost some of her provisions, and water, and had suffered a death among the captives she was carrying.

While Captain Gariscan was deciding what to do with his two prizes, Captain Pica made him an offer. Pica offered to buy Brothers and her 207 captives for a note worth "$25000 pesos". As France and Spain were at war, Gariscan could not take Brothers into Havana. The three vessels (Brutus, Nuestra Señora del Carmen, and Brothers), sailed to Charleston. From there Pica and Brothers sailed to Havana. (Note: The capture of Nuestra Señora del Carmen gave rise to a case before the US Supreme Court.)

Brothers arrived at Havana on 22 March 1795, under the command of Captain Pica. She had embarked 216 captives and arrived with 208, for a 4% mortality rate. Philip Allwood, an agent for Brothers, requested that the Merchant Tribunal in Havana issue an injunction returning the 207 captives to Brother's owners. (Note: The capture of Brothers ultimately gave rise to a case in Madrid.)

Galbraith became captain of Chaser, a vessel that John Dawson also owned. Galbraith sailed from Havana on 13 May and arrived at Liverpool in July. Chaser was in Havana as a French privateer had captured her but two Spanish frigates had recaptured her and taken her into Havana.
