= Slave Trade Act 1788 =

Act of the Parliament of Great Britain

- Act of Parliament
- Parliament of Great Britain
- Long title: An Act to regulate, for a limited Time, the shipping and carrying Slaves in British Vessels from the Coast of Africa.
- Citation: 28 Geo. 3. c. 54
- Territorial extent: Great Britain

Dates
- Royal assent: 11 July 1788
- Commencement: 1 August 1788 (Note: Section 1.)
- Expired: 1 August 1789 (Note: Section 20.)
- Repealed: 21 August 1871
Other legislation
Repealed by	Statute Law Revision Act 1871
Relates to	Slave Trade Act 1799

Status: Repealed

Text of statute as originally enacted

The Slave Trade Act 1788 (28 Geo. 3. c. 54), also known as the Regulated Slave Trade Act 1788, Slave Trade Regulation Act 1788 or Dolben's Act, was an act of the Parliament of Great Britain that limited the number of enslaved people that British slave ships could transport, based on the ships' tons burthen (bm). It was the first British legislation enacted to regulate slave shipping.

== Background ==
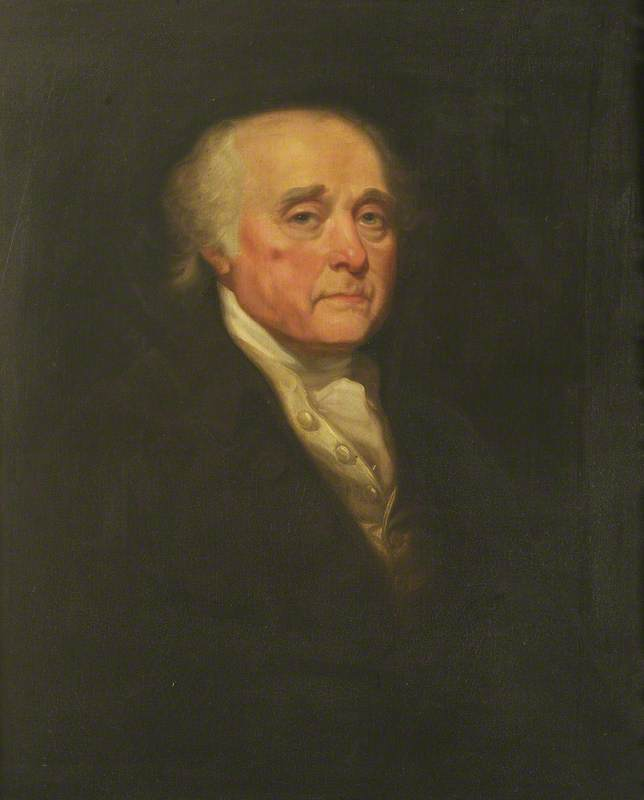
A c. 1802 portrait of Sir William Dolben, 3rd Baronet by Mather Brown

In the late 18th century, opposition to slavery was increasing. Many abolitionists were infuriated by the Zong massacre, whose details became known during litigation in 1783, when the syndicate owning the ship filed for insurance claims to cover 132–142 slaves who had been killed. Quakers had been active in petitioning Parliament to end the trade. To expand their influence, in 1787 they formed a non-denominational group, the Society for the Abolition of the Slave Trade, which included Anglicans of the established church (non-Anglicans were excluded from Parliament).

In 1788, Sir William Dolben led a group of his fellow Members of Parliament to the River Thames to board and examine a ship being fitted for a slaving voyage. Dolben had been in contact with the Abolition Society in the previous year. His visit to the slave-ship appears to have hardened his opposition to the slave trade.

The Society's campaigning led the Prime Minister, William Pitt, to order an investigation into the slave trade. He also asked William Wilberforce to begin a debate in the House of Commons on the issue. However, by May 1788, the trade committee of the Privy Council—which Pitt had tasked with investigating the slave trade—had not produced its report.

On 9 May 1788, Pitt introduced a motion to the House of Commons which asked whether parliament should delay its consideration of the slave trade until its next session. He argued that the great number of anti-slavery petitions that had been presented to the House on this topic meant that a proper consideration of the issue could not occur with so little time left in the current parliamentary session. Representatives from Liverpool, a city whose merchants controlled much of the British slave trade and whose economy was deeply tied to it, welcomed Pitt's motion. They argued for a debate to enable them to refute the accusations about the slave trade made in the petitions submitted to the House.

Sir William Dolben, representing Oxford University, eventually rose to speak. He argued that 10,000 lives would be lost if the House did not immediately intervene to curtail the abuses perpetrated during the Middle Passage. He said that immediate measures should be introduced to restrict the number of Africans that slave ship captains could take on board, as a means to reduce losses. This would reduce mortality due to the diseases of overcrowding and poor sanitation. Although Dolben opposed the slave trade, he did not at this time propose abolishing it or the institution of slavery.

Dolben's speech was disputed by Lord Penrhyn, one of the two MPs for Liverpool. He claimed that captains were highly motivated to preserve the lives of as many slaves as possible, so that they could profit from their sale.

Encouraged by Pitt, Dolben drafted a bill and submitted it to the House on 21 May. The bill passed its second reading on 17 June, and its third reading the following day. It was sent to the House of Lords, where it was approved in its first, second, and third readings, the last of which occurred on 2 July. However, because the Lords had amended the bill—adding a compensation clause, which the Commons felt infringed its right to deal exclusively with money matters—a new bill was drafted, passed, and resubmitted to the Lords. This was passed by them on 10 July, and received royal assent soon after. It was the first British legislation to regulate slave ships.

== Provisions ==
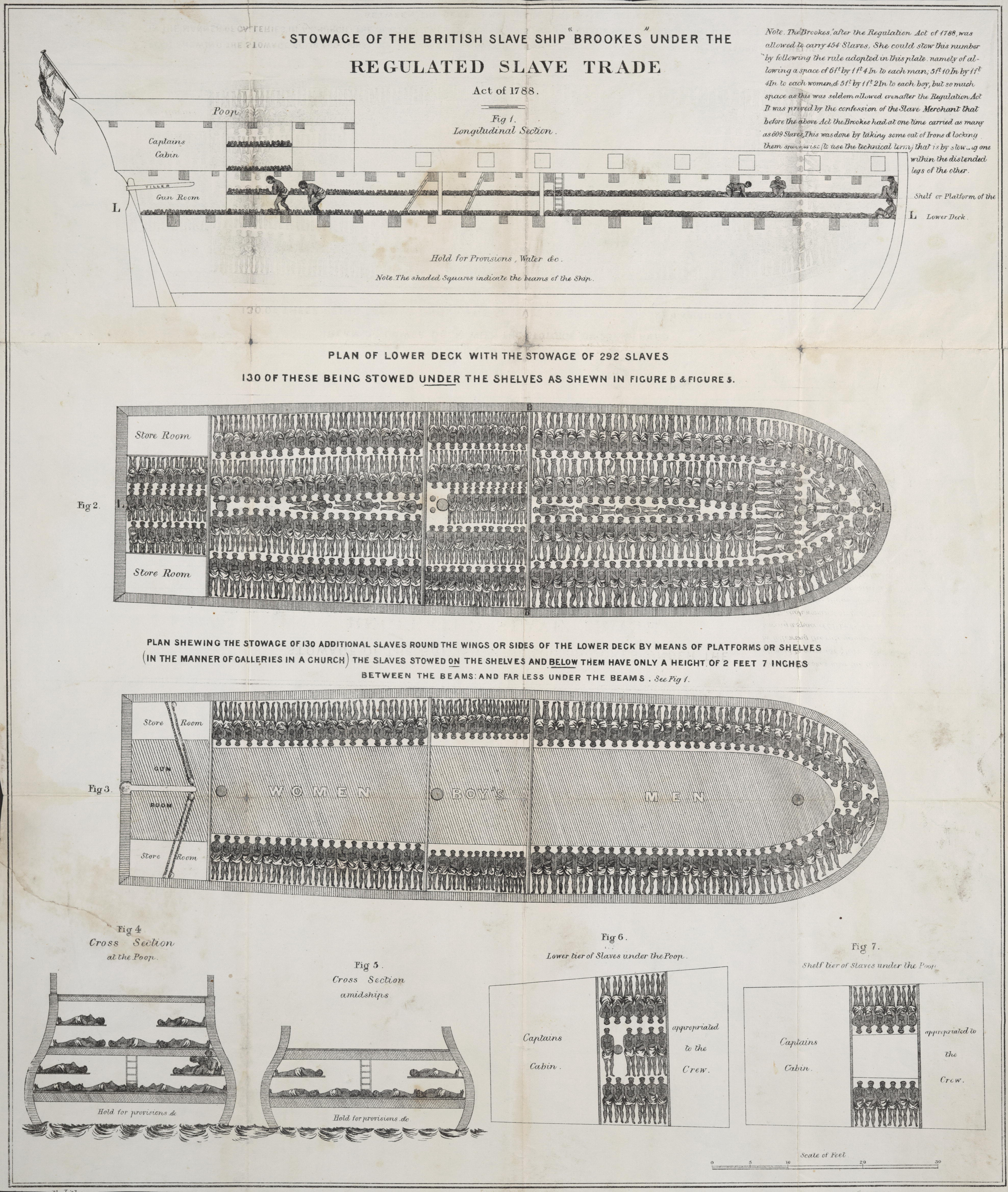
Plan of the slave ship Brookes, carrying 454 slaves after the Slave Trade Act 1788. Previously it had transported 609 slaves and was 267 tons burden, making 2.3 slaves per ton.

The act held that ships could transport 1.67 slaves per ton up to a maximum of 207 tons burthen, after which only 1 slave per ton could be carried.

Slave Trade Act 1799
- Act of Parliament
- Parliament of Great Britain
- Long title: An act for better regulating the manner of carrying slaves, in British vessels, from the coast of Africa.
- Citation: 39 Geo. 3. c. 80
- Territorial extent: Great Britain

Dates
- Royal assent: 12 July 1799
- Commencement: 1 August 1799
- Repealed: 6 August 1861
Other legislation
Repealed by	Statute Law Revision Act 1861
Relates to	Slave Trade Act 1788

Status: Repealed

Text of statute as originally enacted

The provisions of the 1788 act expired after one year, meaning that the act had to be renewed annually by Parliament. Dolben led the effort to do this in subsequent years, so he regularly spoke against the slave trade in Parliament. The act was renewed between 1789 and 1795 and between 1797 and 1798. In 1799 the provisions of the previous acts were made permanent through the Slave Trade Act 1799.

=== Support and opposition ===
The act was supported by some abolitionists, including Olaudah Equiano, an African who was a former slave. But, some abolitionists, such as William Wilberforce, feared that the act would establish the idea that the slave trade was not fundamentally unjust, but merely an activity that needed further regulation. In the House of Commons, John Hamilton opposed the act on abolitionist grounds and claimed that "by such a bill that House would, for the first time, sanction that most abominable traffic, unauthorized by divine law, and so repugnant to human feeling."

== Effects ==
The mortality of slaves on British ships declined during the 1790s. This act helped to lower the overall mortality rate of British ships during the 1790–1830 time period. Due to the lower density of slaves, illnesses could be controlled and food rations would last longer. During this period, ship captains were also given incentives for lower mortality rates. As their incentives would grow, their mortality rates would continue to lower. This information could have been manipulated by greedy captains but the research shows a general downward trend.

The historian Roger Anstey has suggested that this decline might be explained by the restrictions of the act, but the research of several other historians has suggested that there is no demonstrable relationship between reduced crowding and lower mortality rates amongst slaves. More recent research suggests that early work was plagued with measurement error by bad record-keeping, and the act reduced crowding-related mortality. Slave mortality on Dutch ships, which were not subject to restrictions on the number of slaves carried, did not decline during the same period.

== Subsequent developments ==
The whole act was repealed by section 1 of, and the schedule to, the Statute Law Revision Act 1871 (34 & 35 Vict. c. 116), which came into force on 21 August 1871.

== Bibliography ==
- Anstey, Roger; Hale, P. F. H., eds. (1989). Liverpool, the African Slave Trade and Abolition. Historic Society of Lancashire and Cheshire. ISBN 978-0950359151.
- Anstey, Roger (1975). The Atlantic Slave Trade and British Abolition 1760–1810. Prometheus Books.
- Nigel Aston, ‘Dolben, Sir William, third baronet (1727–1814)’, Oxford Dictionary of National Biography, Oxford University Press, 2004.
- Cobbett's Parliamentary History of England [Feb. 1788 – May 1789]. Vol. 27. London: Hansard. 1816.
- Cohn, Raymond (1985). "Deaths of Slaves in the Middle Passage". The Journal of Economic History. 45 (3): 685–692. doi:10.1017/s0022050700034604. JSTOR 2121762. PMID 11617312. S2CID 21327693.
- Drummond, Mary M. (1964). "HAMILTON, John James (1756-1818).". In Namier, Sir Lewis; Brooke, John (eds.). The House of Commons 1754–1790. The History of Parliament Trust.
- Eltis, D.; Engerman, S. L. (1993). "Fluctuations in Sex and Age Ratios in the Transatlantic Slave Trade, 1663–1864". The Economic History Review. 46 (2): 308. doi:10.1111/j.1468-0289.1993.tb01335.x.
- Haines, R.; Shlomowitz, R. (2000). "Explaining the mortality decline in the eighteenth-century British slave trade". The Economic History Review. 53 (2): 262–283. doi:10.1111/1468-0289.00160.
- Hochschild, Adam (2005). Bury the Chains. London: Pan Books.
- Garland, Charles; Klein, Herbert (1985). "The Allotment of Space for Slaves aboard Eighteenth-Century British Slave Ships". William and Mary Quarterly. 42 (2): 238–248. doi:10.2307/1920430. JSTOR 1920430.
- Klein, H. S.; Engerman, S. L.n; Haines, R.; Shlomowitz, R. (2001). "Transoceanic mortality: The slave trade in comparative perspective". The William and Mary Quarterly. 58 (1): 93–117. doi:10.2307/2674420. JSTOR 2674420. PMID 18629973.
- LoGerfo, James (1973). "Sir William Dolben and "The Cause of Humanity": The Passage of the Slave Trade Regulation Act of 1788". Eighteenth-Century Studies. 6 (4): 431–451. doi:10.2307/3031578. JSTOR 3031578.
- Oldfield, J. R. (2010). "The London Committee and mobilization of public opinion against the slave trade". The Historical Journal. 35 (2): 331–343. doi:10.1017/S0018246X00025826. S2CID 155017321.
- Sanderson, F. E. (1972). "The Liverpool Delegates and Sir William Dolben's Bill". Transactions of the Historic Society of Lancashire and Cheshire. Vol. 124. pp. 57–84.
- Sheridan, R. B. (1981). "The Guinea surgeons on the middle passage: The provision of medical services in the British slave trade". The International Journal of African Historical Studies. 14 (4): 601–625. doi:10.2307/218228. JSTOR 218228. PMID 11632197.
- Steckel, R. H.; Jensen, R. A. (2009). "New Evidence on the Causes of Slave and Crew Mortality in the Atlantic Slave Trade". The Journal of Economic History. 46 (1): 57–77. doi:10.1017/S0022050700045502. PMID 11617310. S2CID 29092089.
- Walvin, James (2011). The Zong: A Massacre, the Law and the End of Slavery. New Haven & London: Yale University Press. ISBN 978-0-300-12555-9.
- Webster, J. (2007). "The Zong in the Context of the Eighteenth-Century Slave Trade". The Journal of Legal History. 28 (3): 285–298. doi:10.1080/01440360701698403. S2CID 144216755.
