= Caroline (1794 ship) =

History

Great Britain
- Name: Caroline
- Builder: France
- Launched: 1792
- Acquired: 1794 by purchase of a prize
- Fate: Foundered 2 February 1801

General characteristics
- Tons burthen: 286, or 290 (bm)
- Complement: 35
- Armament: 2 × 6-pounder guns + 16 × 12-pounder carronades

Caroline was a ship launched in France in 1792, possibly under another name. She was taken in prize in 1794 and sailed first as a West Indiaman, then as a whaler in the British southern whale fishery, and finally as a slave ship in the triangular trade in enslaved people. She was lost in 1801, after she had delivered her captives to Kingston, Jamaica on her second voyage from Africa.

== Career ==
Caroline first appeared in Lloyd's Register (LR) in 1794.

Year	Master	Owner	Trade	Source
1794	M'Clanahan	F.Hall	London-Guadeloupe	LR
1797	M'Clanahan; G.Quested	F.Hall; S.Enderby	London-Marinique; London–South Seas	LR

Whaler: Samuel Enderby & Sons purchased Caroline in 1796 and sent her to whale in the British southern whale fishery. Captain George Quested sailed in 1796, bound for the Pacific. In mid-1797 Caroline was at the Galapagos Islands. She returned to London on 21 October 1798.

During the voyage Caroline's master changed from Quested to Bristow, and it was Bristow who brought her into Gravesend. In 1799, Quested had replaced Abraham Bristow as master of Speedy. Bristow had been master of Speedy between 1797 and 1798. Both Speedy and Caroline were sailing for Enderby.

Caroline's ownership changed. Her new owners sailed her from Liverpool to carry captives from West Africa to the West Indies.

Year	Master	Owner	Trade	Source
1800	W.Finlay	S.Clarke	Liverpool–Africa	Register of Shipping (RS)

1st voyage transporting enslaved people (1799–1800): Captain William Findlay (or Finlay) acquired a letter of marque on 17 April 1799. He sailed for West Africa on 14 May 1799. In 1799, 156 vessels sailed from English ports to acquire and transport enslaved people; 134 of these vessels sailed from Liverpool. Caroline acquired captives at Bonny and arrived at Kingston, Jamaica, 9 November with 426 captives. She sailed from Kingston on 10 December and arrived back at Liverpool 27 January 1800. She had left Liverpool with 41 crew members and suffered three crew deaths on the voyage.

2nd voyage transporting enslaved people (1800–1801): Captain Findlay sailed from Liverpool on 6 May 1800, bound for West Africa. In 1800, 133 vessels sailed from English ports to acquire and transport enslaved people; 120 of these vessels sailed from Liverpool. Caroline left with 43 crew members. Caroline arrived at Kingston with 302 captives and 35 crew members. She had suffered four crew deaths on her voyage.

== Fate ==
On 2 February 1801 Caroline, Finlay, master, was lost at Jamaica. Her crew were saved, as were the mails. Caroline had developed a leak as she set out that immediately overwhelmed the pumps, forcing the crew to abandon her. The packet Princess Amelia took the mails to Falmouth. Princess Amelia, Captain Bryant, sailed from Jamaica on 8 February and arrived at Falmouth on 22 March.

A key source reports that in 1801, 23 British vessels in the triangular trade were lost, though it does not report any as having been lost on the last or homeward leg of their voyage. It would take detailed research into vessels' individual histories to identify vessels lost homeward bound from the West Indies as Guineamen, or not. Although Caroline was lost to the perils of the sea, during the period 1793 to 1807, war, rather than maritime hazards or resistance by the captives, was the greatest cause of vessel losses among British vessels engaged in the transportation of enslaved people.
