= Rockingham (ship) =

Several vessels have borne the name Rockingham:

- Rockingham (1767 ship) was launched in America in 1767, and was of 189, or 200 tons (bm). Samuel Enderby & Sons, the whaling company, purchased her perhaps as early as 1767 or 1768; she made eight whaling voyages for them between 1775 and 1782. In 1782 she underwent a good repair and Enderbys renamed her Swift. She then performed whaling voyages on the Brazil Banks and off Africa until 1793. She was still listed in Lloyd's Register as whaling until at least 1795.
- Rockingham (1785 EIC ship) was launched in 1785 at Deptford. She made seven voyages for the British East India Company (EIC) before she was sold in 1802 for breaking up.
- Rockingham (1818 ship), of 42710/94 tons (bm), was launched in 1818 at Sunderland by James Laing. In 1823 she made one voyage for the EIC. She continued trading until 1830 when she was surveyed and then condemned for breaking up.

== See also ==
- HMS Rockingham (G58)
- Marquis of Rockingham (ship)
- USS Rockingham (APA-229)
- Wreck of the Rockingham, 1775
