= Enderby (surname) =

Enderby is a surname. Notable people with the surname include:

- Samuel Enderby (1717–1797), founder of the whaling company Samuel Enderby & Sons
- Samuel Enderby Junior (1756–1829), son of the founder of the whaling company Samuel Enderby & Sons
- Charles Enderby (1798–1876), grandson of the founder of the whaling company Samuel Enderby & Sons
- John Enderby (1931–2021), British physicist
- Kep Enderby (1926–2015), Australian Esperantist and former politician
- Pamela Enderby (born 1949), British speech therapist and academic
