= Alexander Champion =

Alexander Champion may refer to:

- Alexander Champion (East India Company officer) (died 1793), Commander-in-Chief, India, 1774
- Alexander Champion (snr) (died 1795), London based merchant
- Alexander Champion (businessman) (1751–1809), his son, London based merchant and whaler
