= Enderby =

Enderby may refer to:

== Places ==
Antarctica and subantarctic

- Enderby Islands (Islas Enderby), Chile, Magallanes y Antártica Chilena islands
  - Enderby Island (Chile) (Isla Enderby), principal island of the Islas Enderby group
- Enderby Land, a projecting land mass of East Antarctica
- Enderby Plain, an abyssal plain located off the coast of Enderby Land, East Antarctica
- Enderby Point, Falkland Islands

Australia

- Enderby Island (Australia), Western Australia
- Enderby Reef, Western Australia

Canada

- Enderby, British Columbia, a city

Ecuador

- Enderby Island (Ecuador) (Isla Enderby), Galápagos Islands

England

- Enderby, Leicestershire, a civil parish
- Enderby's Wharf, Greenwich Peninsula, London Borough of Greenwich

Federated States of Micronesia

- Enderby Bank, a coral reef near Alet Island, Poluwat Atoll, Chuuk state
- Enderby Island (Micronesia), also known as Poluwat Atoll, Chuuk state

New Zealand

- Enderby Island
- Mount Enderby
- Point Enderby

== Other ==
- Enderby (surname)
- Enderby (fictional character), the protagonist in a series of novels by Anthony Burgess
