= Charles Enderby =

One of three sons of Samuel Enderby Junior

Charles Enderby (1797–1876) was one of three sons of Samuel Enderby Junior (1756–1829). He was the grandson of Samuel Enderby (1717–1797), who founded the Samuel Enderby & Sons company in 1775. Samuel Enderby & Sons was one of the most prominent English sealing and whaling firms, active in both the Arctic and Southern Oceans. Charles and his two brothers, Henry and George, inherited Samuel Enderby & Sons when their father Samuel Junior died in 1829. They moved the company headquarters in 1830 from Paul's Wharf to Great St. Helens in London.

== Role of Samuel Enderby & Sons in exploration of Antarctica and the Southern Ocean ==
Also in 1830, Charles became a founding member of the Royal Geographical Society (RGS). He served on the council of the RGS on several occasions between 1842 and 1847. Charles encouraged masters of Enderby vessels to report geographical discoveries and had notable successes with John Biscoe and John Balleny, who between them discovered Enderby Land, Graham Land, the Balleny Islands and the Sabrina Coast. Another Enderby captain, Abraham Bristow, discovered the Auckland Islands in 1806, naming one of the islands Enderby Island. In January, 1841 he was elected a Fellow of the Royal Society

== Effect of exploratory voyages on viability of Samuel Enderby & Sons ==
These many voyages of exploration, while fruitful in terms of geographical discovery, were not financially profitable for the Enderby family business. While the exploratory voyages were slowly sapping the company's resources, the destruction of Enderby's Hemp Rope Works, the company's rope-making factory on the Greenwich Peninsula in the London Borough of Greenwich, triggered an immediate need for a change in the company business plan.

== Auckland Islands and the Enderby Settlement ==
Looking for a way to revive the firm's fortunes, Charles Enderby successfully petitioned for government backing to establish a settlement on the Auckland Islands 'for the purpose of the whale fishery, as a station at which to discharge the cargoes and refit vessels'. In 1846, Charles founded the Southern Whale Fishery Company in England. In December 1849, he established the Enderby Settlement in Erebus Cove, Port Ross, at the north-eastern end of Auckland Island, close to Enderby Island. This was the beginning of the community named Hardwicke. The Hardwicke settlement was based on agriculture, resupply and minor repair of ships, and whaling. However, the cold, damp climate and acid soils made agriculture impossible, and the eight whaling ships attached to the station caught very few whales. Ultimately unsuccessful, the colony was abandoned in August 1852.

== Final years ==
Charles Enderby returned to London in 1853. The ill-fated Enderby Settlement finally bankrupted the Enderby family business, which was liquidated in 1854. He lived for a time in Northfleet in a house owned by friend and former whaling entrepreneur Thomas Sturge. Charles Enderby died in poverty in London on 31 August 1876.
