= Sarah (1800 ship) =

British whaling vessel

History

United Kingdom
- Name: Sarah
- Builder: Hartlepoole
- Launched: 1800 or 1801
- Fate: Last listed in 1826

General characteristics
- Tons burthen: 290 (bm)
- Propulsion: Sail
- Armament: 2 × 3-pounder guns + 2 × 12-pounder carronades

Sarah was launched at Hartlepool in 1800. Between 1807 and 1813 Sarah made two voyages as a whaler in the British southern whale fishery. On her first whaling voyage her captain claimed the Auckland Islands for Britain. As she was coming home a French privateer captured her, but a British privateer recaptured her. After her whaling voyages Sarah became a transport, a West Indiaman, and traded with North America. She was last listed in 1826.

== Career ==
Susan entered Lloyd's Register in 1801 with G. Robson, master and owner. The next year her master changed from Robson to Lightley, and her trade from London–Jamaica to London–St. Domingo.

J. Lightly sold Sarah to Samuel Enderby & Sons c. 1807. The information did not get into the Register of Shipping until 1809, and later into Lloyd's Register. The registers were only as accurate as shipowners chose to keep them, and in this case they carried stale data for some time. The 1809 register showed Sarah with A. Bristow, master, Enderby, owner, and trade London–South Seas.

Sarah, Abraham Bristow, master, sailed from England on 24 March 1807, bound for New Zealand. Bristow had discovered the Auckland Islands in 1806 as master on the whaler Ocean. When he visited again in October 1807 on Sarah he claimed the archipelago for Britain. During 1808 Sarah gathered a full cargo fur and seal pelts.

On 26 October 1809, the French privateer Revenge captured Sarah, Bristow, master, at 48°12′N 10°0′E. (Note: Revanche (French for revenge), was a 112-ton (French; "of load") privateer brig from Saint-Malo, commissioned in August 1809 under Etienne-Pierre Laurent, with 74 men and 6 guns. The British captured her in October 1809.) Sarah was returning to Britain from the South Seas. The British letter of marque Enterprize, Bateman, master, recaptured Sarah on 10 November and sent her to Cadiz or Lisbon. (Note: William Bateman had acquired a letter of marque on 24 May 1808. Enterprize, of 398 tons (bm), carried twenty 9–pounder guns and a crew of 45 men.) On 22 November Sarah had arrived at Cadiz after her recapture.

On 15 December Sarah was in the Downs when a gale developed. She lost her anchors and was blown into Margate Roads.

Sarah returned on 20 April 1810.

Enderby sold Sarah to Mather & Co., who sent her on a second whaling voyage. Captain William Davey sailed from England on 24 July 1810. Sarah returned on 9 January 1813.

Lloyd's Register for 1814 showed Sarah with Weatherly, master, Mather & Co., owners, and trade London transport. She had undergone repairs in 1813.

Year	Master	Owner	Trade	Source & notes
1815	Weatherly	Mather & Co.	London transport	Lloyd's Register (LR); good repair 1813
1820	Harland	Captain & Co.	London–St Thomas	LR; good repair 1813
1825	Harland	Captain & Co.	London–St Thomas	LR; good repair 1813; last listing in LR
1825	Weatherby	Weatherby	London–Merimac	Register of Shipping (RS); small repairs 1813
1826	Weatherby	Weatherby	London–Merimac	RS; small repairs 1813; last listing in RS
