= Marquis of Rockingham (ship) =

Numerous ships have been named Marquis of Rockingham, or Marquess of Rockingham, named for British prime minister Charles Watson-Wentworth, 2nd Marquess of Rockingham:

- Marquis of Rockingham was a vessel British built in 1764, of 100 tons (bm), Heywood and Co., owners. This may be the Marquis of Rockingham (1764), of 160 tons (bm), that became the Reina de Portugal.
- Marquis of Rockingham was a vessel of 400 tons (bm). 22 guns, and 60 crew. She made a voyage from Britain in 1769 to Bombay, via Johanna and Tellicheri, to remain in the East Indies.
- Marquis of Rockingham, Captain Isaac Pocock, was a transport that an American privateer, possibly the Sturdy Beggar, captured on 14 November 1777. HMS Perseus, HMS Roebuck, and HMS Camilla recaptured her.
- Marquis of Rockingham was a transport that on 17 December 1778 was sailing from Newport, Rhode Island, to New York City to with a cargo of hay when she wrecked at Gardiner's Island, New York. The American privateers American Revenue and Governor Turnbull rescued the five survivors of her crew of 22.
- Marquis of Rockingham (1771 EIC ship), an East Indiaman that made one voyage for the East India Company before she sank off Madras in May 1777 during her second voyage.
- HMS Adventure, a barque launched in 1769 under the name Marquis of Rockingham, that the Royal Navy purchased and that sailed with Cook in the early 1770s. The navy sold her in 1783 and she traded as a merchantman until she was wrecked in 1811.

== See also ==
- Wreck of the Rockingham, 1775
- Rockingham (ship)
