= Southern Whale Fishery Company =

Former whaling company

The Southern Whale Fishery Company was established by the granting of a royal charter in 1846 to Charles Enderby, for the purpose of operating a permanent whaling station on the Auckland Islands. Charles Enderby was the grandson of Samuel Enderby, founder of the prominent sealing and whaling firm, Samuel Enderby & Sons.

The Enderby family business had been in decline following losses made by several ambitious expeditions to the Southern Ocean, and especially since 1845, when Enderby's Hemp Rope Works, its rope-making factory on the Greenwich Peninsula in the London Borough of Greenwich was destroyed by fire. Looking for a way to save the family business, Charles Enderby successfully petitioned for government backing to establish a settlement on the Auckland Islands 'for the purpose of the whale fishery, as a station at which to discharge the cargoes and refit vessels'.

== Auckland Islands settlement ==
Enderby was appointed lieutenant governor of the Auckland Islands. In December 1849, he led an expedition comprising three ships carrying 150 settlers and stores to the Auckland Islands and established the Enderby Settlement in Erebus Cove, Port Ross, at the north-eastern end of Auckland Island, close to Enderby Island.

Land was cleared for the colony and whaling station, and the community of Hardwicke was established. The settlement was based on agriculture, resupply and minor repair of ships, and whaling. However, the cold, damp climate and acid soils made agriculture impossible, and the eight whaling ships attached to the station caught very few whales. Ultimately unsuccessful, the colony was abandoned in August 1852.

Charles Enderby returned to London in 1853. The ill-fated Enderby Settlement finally bankrupted the Enderby family business, which was liquidated in 1854. Charles Enderby died in poverty in London on 31 August 1876.
