= Samuel Enderby Junior =

English whaling and sealing company head (1755–1829)

Samuel Enderby (1755–1829) was a British whaling merchant, significant in the history of whaling in Australia.

== Family background ==
His father, Samuel Enderby (1717–1797), founded the firm named after him in 1775, when he assembled a fleet of whaling vessels on the Greenwich Peninsula, on the south bank of the Thames just downstream of the City of London. Samuel Enderby & Sons was a prominent whaling and sealing firm between 1775 and 1854. He was in partnership with a man named Buxton at St Paul's Wharf, i.e. near the cathedral of the City of London. Samuel junior, like his father, was apprenticed to a cooper as a young man.

The senior Samuel Enderby married Mary Buxton, a daughter of his partner, and they had three sons, Charles, Samuel, and George, to whom he eventually bequeathed his estate. The younger Samuel Enderby was baptised, as recorded in the protestant Dissenters Registry, on 4 June 1755.

Charles married Elizabeth Goodwyn, and had an orphanage in Coombe Hill, Blackheath. This couple had no children of their own but they raised Maria King, daughter of Philip Gidley King (later governor of New South Wales), until she married Hannibal Hawkins Macarthur, a prominent early colonist of Australia, on 14 February 1813. Mrs. Charles Enderby left her money to a niece, Caroline Hawkins.

George Enderby married Henrietta Samson. They lived in Coombe House near Croydon, Surrey. They had no children.

== Career ==
In 1800, with his partner Alexander Champion, Enderby successfully petitioned that his whalers should be allowed to take provisions for the New South Wales colony to compete with American merchants. He sent cargoes 'well adapted for the inhabitants' in the Greenwich, which reached Sydney Cove in May 1801, and then in the Britannia. Enderby's friend, Governor Philip Gidley King, was instrumental in facilitating the whaling and trading activities of the Enderby Brothers firm.

The vessels of the Enderby Brothers company helped to explore and chart the Southern Ocean. The Enderby captain Abraham Bristow discovered the Auckland Islands in 1806, naming one of the islands Enderby Island.

== Marriage and children ==
The younger Samuel Enderby married Mary Goodwyn, sister of his brother's wife Elizabeth, on 2 April 1787 at St Botolph's Aldgate in the City of London. They had eight children. Their daughter Elizabeth (1792–1873) married Henry William Gordon (1786–1865) and became the mother of 12 children, one of whom was Gordon of Khartoum. Their three sons, Charles, Henry and George, inherited the firm on his death in 1829. Sons Samuel IV & William were cut out of the firm all their life. Charles became a member of the Royal Society and died in poverty in 1876. Charles, Henry, and George never married and had no legitimate children, Samuel IV is reputed to have been married four times. He had a daughter, Georgina Mary, who inherited through her mother Mary (née Whyte), his third wife, the estates of the Whytes of Redhills in County Cavan. William Enderby is the only one to have male children.
