= Princess Amelia (1799 packet) =

Packet boat captured by the US Navy

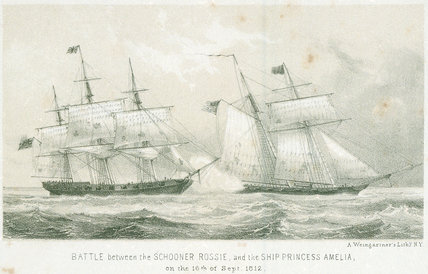
- Rossie capturing Princess Amelia, 1812

History

United Kingdom
- Name: Princess Amelia
- Namesake: Princess Amelia of the United Kingdom
- Launched: 1799
- Fate: Captured September 1812

United States
- Name: USS Georgia
- Namesake: Congressman George Troup of Georgia
- Acquired: By purchase of a prize
- Renamed: USS Troup
- Fate: Sold, 1815

General characteristics
- Type: Brig
- Tons burthen: 179 (bm)
- Sail plan: Brig
- Complement: 28 (British service)
- Armament: British service: 4 × 6-pounder guns + 2 × 9-pounder guns; US service: 4 × 18-pounder carronades + 4 × 12-pounder carronades + 4 × 6-pounder carronades

Princess Amelia was launched in 1799 and became a packet for the British Post Office Packet Service, sailing from Falmouth, Cornwall. She sailed to North America, the West Indies, Mediterranean, and Brazil. In 1800 a French privateer captured her, but she returned to the packet service later the same year. Joshua Barney, in the American privateer Rossie, captured her on 16 September 1812, at the start of the War of 1812. The United States Navy took her into service as HMS Georgia, but then renamed her USS Troup. She served as a guardship at Savannah; the Navy sold her in 1815.

== Packet ==
As a packet, Princess Amelia sailed from Falmouth on numerous voyages to Jamaica, to the Mediterranean, and to Brazil.

On 14 May 1800 a French privateer captured Princess Amelia packet, Richard Stevens, master, as she was returning from the Leeward Islands, and took her into Bordeaux. The privateer was Decide, or Grande Decide of Bordeaux. (Note: Grand Decide, of eighteen or twenty-two 12-pounder guns and 150, or 220 men, was a privateer from Bordeaux commissioned in February 1799 under Duchêne, also spelled Duchesne-Lasalle (who went by the nickname of "Black Privateer".) On 12 October 1800 the Danish vessel Two Sisters, Gardrund, master, came into Falmouth from Bordeaux, in ballast. Two Sisters was the former Princess Amelia packet. The Packet Service took Princess Amelia back into service. On 17 December 1800 Princess Amelia, G. Bryant, master, sailed from Falmouth for Jamaica.

On 18 December 1800 Grantham Packet, Bull, master, was going to Jamaica from Falmouth was wrecked on the Mendham Shoals off Barbados. The people aboard her were rescued. The Post Office hired Caroline to carry the passengers and mail that Grantham Packet was to carry to England, but Caroline was wrecked at Jamaica before she could leave for England. Princess Amelia Packet, Bryant, master, took the passengers and mail to Falmouth, leaving Jamaica on 8 February and arriving at Falmouth on 22 March.

Princess Amelia twice had to go into quarantine at Falmouth because of deaths due to fever. Princess Amelia, Richard Stevens, master, left Tortola on 19 January 1805 and arrived at Falmouth on 10 February. Because two crew members had died of fever on the passage she went into quarantine on her arrival. In 1807 Captain Stevens and eight crew members died of yellow fever at Jamaica. Princess Amelia arrived at Falmouth on 11 January 1808.

Princess Amelia Packet arrived in Falmouth on 2 July 1811, having sailed from Jamaica in April. In August 1812 she left Bridgetown, Barbados, for St. Thomas. From there she sailed for England. It was on this voyage back to Falmouth that she encountered Rossie.

Rossie was armed with ten 12-pounder guns and one long 9-pounder on a pivot, and had a crew of 95; Princess Amelia was armed with four 6-pounders and two 9-pounders, and had a crew of 27 or 28. Princess Amelia had to strike after she had lost three men killed, including her captain, Isaac Moorsom, and her sailing master, John Nankivell, and 11 men wounded. (Some of the wounded may have died later as a report on her arrival in Savannah gives her casualties as six dead and six or seven wounded.) American casualties were seven men wounded, one of them, the first lieutenant, severely. (Note: The merchant ship Hibernia apparently repatriated Princess Amelia's mate and crew. Rossie's first lieutenant later died of his wounds.) (Note: The gross proceeds for Princess Amelia amounted to $3284.03. Barney received a 10% commission, and Kemp's agent received 21/2%. The crew's half share was worth $1440.87. The total number of shares was 3083/4, with most crew members owning more than one share. The value of one share was $4.66. The owners received a half share too, i.e., $1440.87.)

Rossie sent her prize into Savannah, Georgia. American sources reported that Princess Amelia's passengers had expressed their thanks for the polite treatment they received from Captain Barney. (Note: After Barney left Rossie to join the US Navy, Rossie became a letter of marque. The Royal Navy captured her on 6 January 1813 in the Basque roads. She was carrying coffee from Baltimore to Bordeaux.)

== USS Troup ==
At Savannah the United States Navy bought Princess Amelia Packet and named her Georgia. The US Navy then changed her name to Troup, naming her after Congressman George Troup of Georgia who had written to Secretary Hamilton urging her purchase.

The US Navy used Troup as a guard and receiving ship at Savannah for the remainder of the War of 1812, under the command of a Captain Walpole. She was sold at Savannah in 1815.

== Sources ==
- Brannan, J. (1823). Official Letters of the Military and Naval Officers of the United States, During the War with Great Britain in the Years 1812, 13, 14, & 15: With Some Additional Letters and Documents Elucidating the History of that Period. Library of American civilization. Way & Gideon.
- Demerliac, Alain (1999). La Marine de la Révolution: Nomenclature des Navires Français de 1792 A 1799 (in French). Éditions Ancre. ISBN 2-906-38124-1.
- Dudley, W.S.; Crawford, M.J.; Hughes, C.F.; Naval Historical Center (U.S.) (1985). The Naval War of 1812: A Documentary History. The Naval War of 1812: A Documentary History. Naval Historical Center, Department of Navy. ISBN 978-0-945-27406-3.
- Garitee, Jerome R. (1977). The Republic's Private Navy: The American Privateering Business as Practiced by Baltimore During the War of 1812. Mystic Seaport.
- Good, Timothy S., ed. (2012). American privateers in the war of 1812: the vessels and their prizes as recorded in Niles' weekly register. McFarland. ISBN 978-0-786-46695-5.
- Norway, A.H. (1895). History of the Post-office Packet Service Between the Years 1793-1815. Macmillan and Company.
- Olenkiewicz, John S (2018). "British Packet Sailings West Indies" (PDF).
- Silverstone, P.H. (2006). The Sailing Navy, 1775-1854. The U.S. Navy warship series. Routledge. ISBN 978-0-415-97872-9.
