= Abraham Bristow =

British explorer

- Born: c. 1771; Begbroke, Oxfordshire
- Died: October 1846
- Occupation: Mariner
- Years active: 1793–1820
- Known for: Discovery of the Auckland Islands

Abraham Bristow (c. 1771–1846) was a British mariner, sealer and whaler. In August 1806, he was the first European to discover the Auckland Islands.

== Life and early maritime career ==
Bristow was baptised 22 March 1771 at Begbroke, Oxfordshire; the fifth child and third son of Abraham Bristow Senior and Rachael Johnson. He had four brothers and four sisters. When he was about 16 years of age Abraham was bound as an apprentice seaman in the Southern Whale Fishery to Messers Enderby of London. He first enters the public record as the chief officer (first mate) aboard the Enderby owned vessel Speedy (Captain Thomas Melville) which left London in December 1793 for Australia, under charter as a government store ship, arriving at Sydney in June 1794 with much needed provisions for the colonists at Port Jackson. After landing its cargo Speedy went whaling off the coast of New South Wales, before crossing the Tasman to New Zealand. The vessel then sailed east across the Pacific to South America. Supplies were obtained at Chile before Speedy cruised for whales off the Galapagos Islands in company with the whaler Emilia. During this voyage they discovered a new whaling ground near the coast of Ecuador, close to the equator, that came to be known as the "On Shore Ground." Speedy returned to London 19 October 1796 with 185 tuns of sperm whale oil and 6,703 seal skins.

Abraham Bristow was in command of Speedy on its next whaling voyage, that began in 1796. By November that year, the vessel was reported in the Pacific between the Juan Fernandez Islands and Easter Island. She returned to London 2 July 1799.

His next command was the Enderby-owned whaler Ocean (243 tons) which departed Britain in May 1800. He called at Sydney on 7 April 1801, with 270 barrels of sperm whale oil aboard, plus casks of salt for salting seal skins. After a few weeks there he departed Port Jackson for the eastern Pacific, returning to London in November 1802.

On 27 April 1797, Bristow married Elizabeth Jones at Bermondsey in London. He departed soon after on another whaling voyage in command of the Ocean, returning in January 1805.

== Discovery of the Auckland Islands ==
After three months at home he sailed again for the South Seas as master of the same vessel, departing London 2 April 1805. By 13 August they were at Adventure Bay near Hobart with 70 tuns of right whale oil, one of the first whalers to exploit the recently discovered right whale fishery in the Derwent Estuary. From there they departed for the sperm whale fishery off New Zealand. They returned to Adventure Bay off Tasmania in May 1806, and departed for Britain on 4 August. Two weeks later, on 18 August 1806, they discovered the Auckland Islands. Bristow wrote in his log,

... being the first discoverer, I shall call the island or islands Lord Auckland's (my friend through my father). They are situated in latitude 50 degrees 48 minutes South, and longitude 166 degrees 42 minutes East ... The land is of moderate height, and from its appearance I have no doubt but it will afford a good harbour in the north end ... This place I should suppose abounds with seals, and sorry I am that the time and the lumbering state of my ship do not allow me to examine them.

The "lumbering state" of Ocean meant the vessel did not reach London till February 1807.

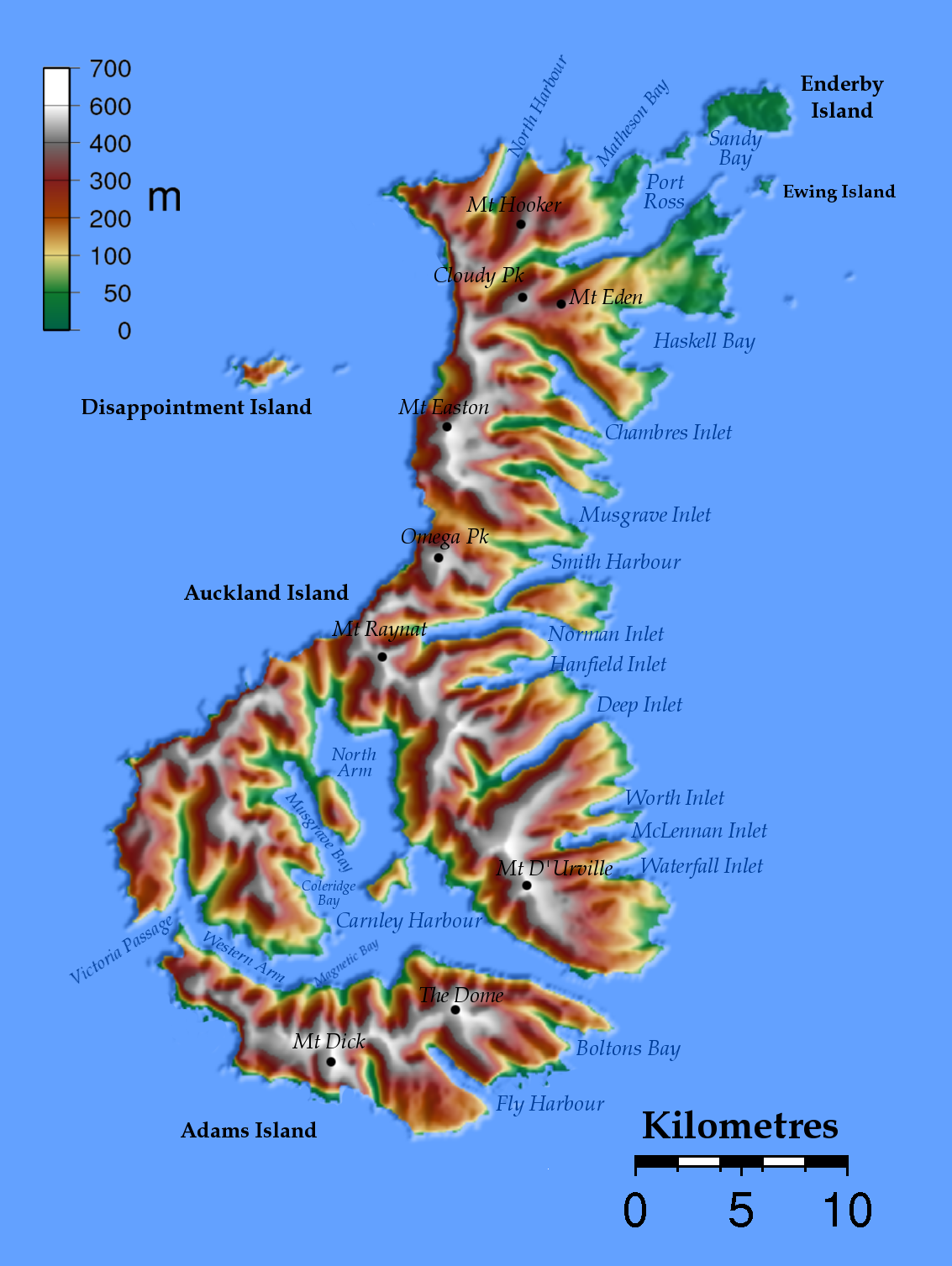
Topographical map of the Auckland Islands.

Bristow's next commanded the Enderby-owned whaler Sarah. She departed London in April 1807 and arrived at the Auckland Islands in October, for a more detailed examination, and to claim the islands for Britain. The group consisted of six separate islands with a total area of 240 square miles (620 km^{2}).

I arrived at them in the Sarah the 20th October 1807. The mountains were then covered with snow, the weather exceptionally cold, with almost continual storms of wind. The atmosphere was uncommonly thick and heavy, and until the end of October much snow fell. November produced heavy rain, and in fact till I left the island on 19th December scarce a day passed without wet and the most tempestuous weather for a continuance I ever experienced in any port. Although the seasons appeared to be late, yet vegetation is very rapid ...Animals I saw none but the amphibious kind, such as hair seals and elephants [seals], and they are not very numerous ... For the benefit of future navigators, I left a breed of hogs on Enderby Island.

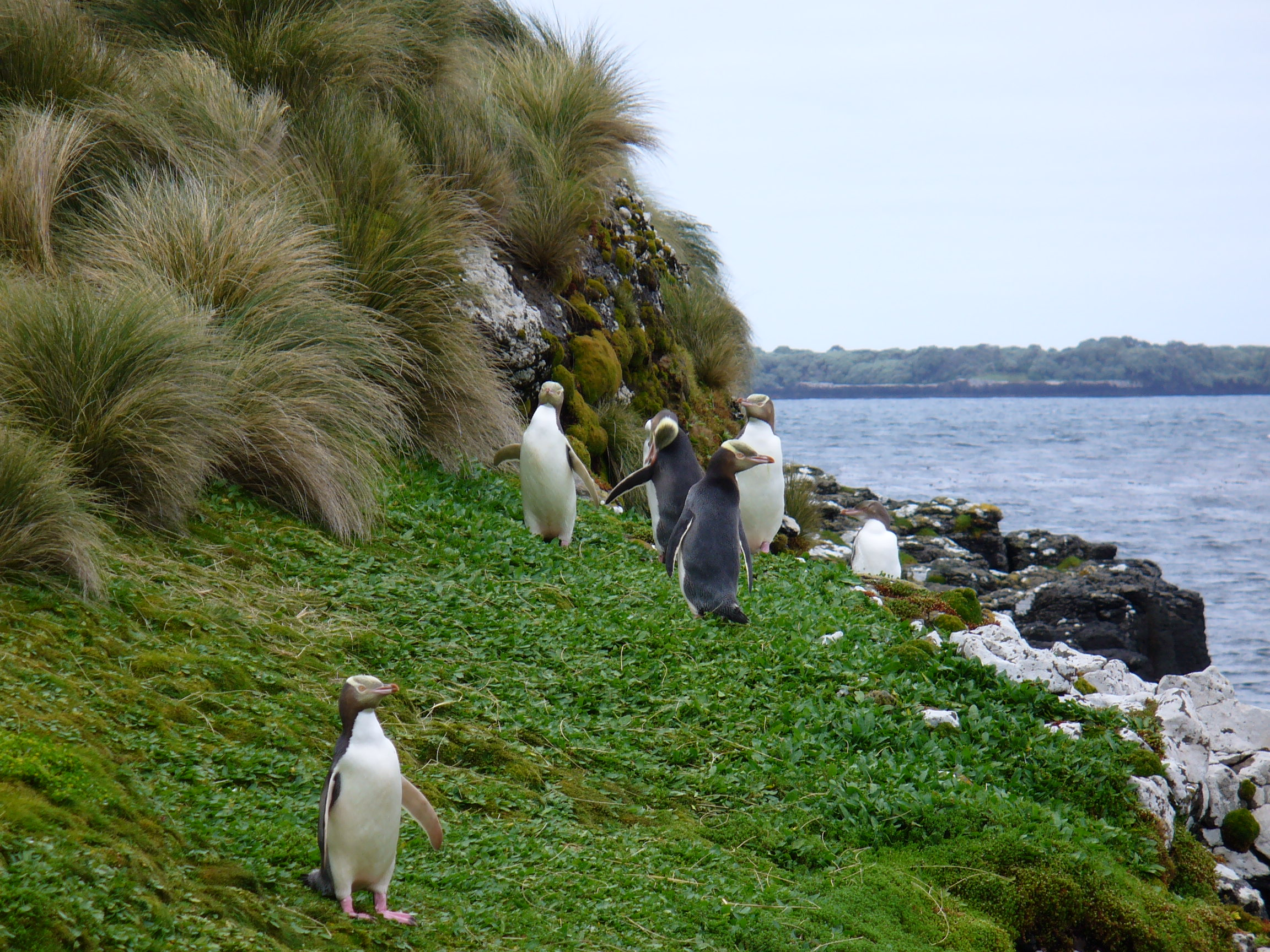
Yellow-eyed penguins on Enderby Island, Auckland Islands.

Although Bristow took possession of the Auckland Islands for the British Crown they proved of little value during the 19th century. Charles Enderby, whose father owned the ship on which Bristow discovered the islands, established a whaling settlement that lasted from 1849 to 1852. Another attempt to colonize the islands, by a mixed group of Maori and Moriori natives from the Chatham Islands, lasted a little longer (1843 to 1856).

== Later maritime career ==
After leaving the Auckland Islands in December 1807, Sarah resumed sperm whaling, calling at Norfolk Island for provisions. Captain Bristow seems to have formed a friendship with the commandant of the penal colony on the island, Joseph Foveaux. They remained in contact and are reported dining together in London in the 1820s. Sarah next went to Sydney, arriving in June 1808. The vessel then departed for the north, cruising among the Solomon Islands, off Bougainville and Papua New Guinea. Bristow refined and corrected observations made by earlier navigators in these waters, later publishing his findings, which were described by Purdy as, "certainly more accurate than those before obtained." Bristow also pioneered a new route along the north coast of Papua New Guinea to the Moluccas in Indonesia. The cruise also took them to the Solomon Islands, Bougainville and among the hazardous islands and reefs of the Louisiade Archipelago. By May 1809 they were between Makassar and Timor. On the way home, Sarah was captured by a French privateer on 26 October 1809. Three weeks later she was retaken by a British vessel and sent to either Lisbon or Cádiz. Bristow was back in London by January 1810. He reported to Lord Auckland he had named a group of islands in his honour. He also reported the discovery to the Hydrographer of the Admiralty and to the main cartographers in London. Purdy published a new chart in 1810 that showed routes from Sydney to China, including Captain Bristow's new track from Port Jackson through Dampier Strait to the Moluccas.

Bristow's next command was the Yarmouth brig Minerva (101 tons). She was a twenty-year-old vessel in poor condition and he remained in charge for a year, in the coasting trade.

His next command was the 377-ton vessel Thames, a South Sea whaler owned by William Mellish & Co. of London. The vessel left London on 3 June 1811 and reached Hobart on 30 October. They were reported at Norfolk Island in April 1812 and were later off New Caledonia, where several unchartered reefs and low islands were discovered. These were named Mellish Reef and Cay and still bear that name today. They next called at the Solomon Islands where yams, bananas and coconuts were obtained by barter with the natives. They did more trading off Bougainville and Bouka for fresh food. From there they headed toward New Ireland, Bristow frequently recording navigational observations he used to correct the charts of Dampier, Bougainville and Labillardiere. North along the coast of New Guinea they sailed and past Durville Point where on 21 September they anchored in a harbour Bristow named Thames Roads. They traded with the natives for yams, pumpkins and sweet potatoes. A boats sent to sound between Mellish Island and Jobi was chased by seven canoes, which fired arrows, but caused no casualties. In October the ship was embayed during rough weather and spent four days "in danger of shipwreck on a coast where if we escaped with our lives, we had to expect only to become a prey to the savage inhabitants." They next crossed into the islands of the Indonesian archipelago and on to the Moluccas. They anchored at Kemar where they obtained good water and provisions, in exchange for iron knives and handkerchiefs. From there they went to Dili in Timor. The ship turned then for home, reaching London 21 December 1813. There, Captain Bristow again reported his discoveries to the Admiralty and leading independent chartmakers.

His next command seems to have been another Mellish-owned South Sea whaler, Sir Andrew Hammond (302 tons). This vessel departed London in 1816 and by January 1818 was reported at Timor. The vessel called at St Helena on the return journey, arriving London in May 1818 with 560 casks of whale oil. Jones says Bristow made one more South Sea voyage in this vessel and was at the Galapagos Islands by April 1820. But this and his latter years are shrouded in uncertainty.

A vessel called the Minstrel left London for the South Seas under a Captain Bristow in December 1819 and was reported sealing at the New South Shetland Islands, but by then under the command of a Captain McGregor. A Captain Bristow commanded the Venus which sailed for South America in October 1822. And a Captain Bristow was in command the whaler Duke of Argyll when it was spoken off the Cape of Good Hope in October 1834. But there is no certainty any of these last three reports relate to Abraham Bristow.
