= Britannia (1783 whaler) =

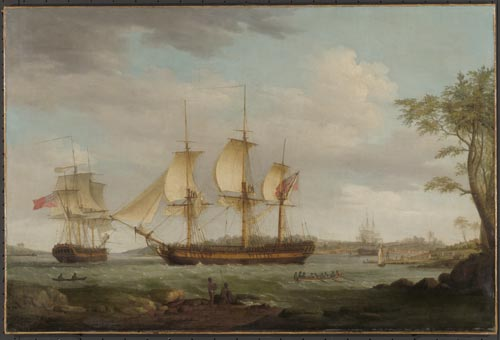
- "Departure of the whaler Britannia from Sydney Cove, 1798", Thomas Whitcombe; National Library of Australia

History

Great Britain
- Name: Britannia
- Owner: Samuel Enderby & Sons
- Launched: 1783, Bridport, England
- Fate: Wrecked 25 August 1806

General characteristics
- Type: Whaler
- Tons burthen: 301, or 520 (Note: This burthen is not supported in any source but Bateson, who stated that at the time of his writing little or nothing was known of Britannia and her origins.) (bm)
- Sail plan: Full-rigged
- Complement: 26
- Armament: 6 cannons
- Notes: During the period 1790-1800, or so, six or seven vessels named Britannia engaged in whaling in the South Seas, or visited Australia. Separating them out is a non-trivial task as records appear to conflate them.

Britannia was a 301 burthen ton full-rigged whaler built in 1783 in Bridport, England, and owned by the whaling firm Samuel Enderby & Sons. She also performed two voyages transporting convicts to Port Jackson. She was wrecked in 1806 off the coast of New South Wales.

== Career ==
=== First convict voyage (1791) ===
Under the command of Thomas Melvill (not Melville), Britannia was one of 11 ships that departed from the United Kingdom in early 1791 as part of the Third Fleet, bound for the Sydney penal settlement. Britannia departed Portsmouth, England, on 27 March 1791 and arrived in Sydney Cove on 14 October 1791. She embarked 150 prisoners, of whom 21 died during the course of the voyage.

=== First whaling voyage (1791–1793) ===
She afterwards went whaling in the South Seas, (Note: Letter from Thomas Melville to Messrs. Samuel Enderby and Sons, 29 Nov 1791.) leaving on 24 October. She returned to Port Jackson on 10 November. On her first day out she was in company with William and Mary. They killed seven whales, but were only able to retrieve two. Britannia's share of the takings amounted to 12 barrels of oil. Britannia went out again, but returned in December, not having been able to catch anything. Melvill was awarded a trophy for shooting the first whale in the South Sea.

Britannia left on 7 January 1792, intending to cruise for three months, and then either sail back to Port Jackson, or for England, depending on her fortunes. She arrived home on 9 August 1793, with 118 tuns sperm oil plus 1900 seal skins. In 1793 Tysack (or Tyzack) Hullock became her master, and in 1795 James Wilkie replaced him.

=== Second convict voyage (1798–1799) ===
Britannia, under command of Robert Turnbull, departed England in early 1798 and arrived in Port Jackson on 18 July 1798. She embarked 96 female convicts two of whom died during the voyage. On 7 October 1798, she left Port Jackson, ostensibly for England.

=== Second whaling voyage (1798) ===
However, she actually went whaling just off the coast of New South Wales. She spent a little over two months at sea, perhaps some 30 leagues off shore, and returned on 29 December with 60 tons of spermaceti oil. She then left for England.

=== Third whaling voyage (1801–1802) ===
Britannia sailed from Britain on 21 November 1800, with Turnbull, master. Britannia arrived Sydney 26 March 1801. While at Port Jackson Captain Turnbull was one of three South Sea whaling masters interviewed by Governor King about the best route to Australia and the relative merits of the whale fishery offshore compared with that off the west coast of South America. Britannia departed Sydney in May with a few tuns of sperm oil aboard. Britannia returned on 9 July 1801 with 550 barrels of sperm oil and departed 3 November.

By 10 December she was at the island of Mocco. She returned to Port Jackson 12 May 1802, and reported to Governor King at New South Wales that she had gathered 1300 barrels of oil. Left Sydney 12 June and returned to England on 7 December 1802.

=== Fourth whaling voyage (1803–1806) ===
Captain George Quested sailed Britannia from England on 7 May 1803, bound for New Zealand. She stopped in Rio de Janeiro in June for refreshment and repairs. In May 1804 she was "all well" off the coast of New Zealand.

Britannia sailed again on 17 September 1804, for the Pacific Ocean, with Nathaniel Goodspeed (or Godspied, or Godsped), master. She was on the coast of Peru 10 April 1805, in ballast. She was reported to have been well in May 1805. She returned to Britain on 9 December 1805. She was at Sydney from the coast of California 22 June 1806 after having been out 22 months. She had gathered 16,000 to 20,000 seal skins plus at least 95 tons of sperm oil.

== Fate ==
Britannia was wrecked at 0200 on the morning of 25 August 1806. The wrecking occurred on either Middleton Reef or Elizabeth Reef, some 297 miles east of the Clarence River Heads in New South Wales. She struck the reef several times before waves lifted her onto the reef where her back was broken. When the crew lowered the lifeboats, one was immediately smashed but the two others, with nineteen men in all aboard, got away. Five men stayed aboard Britannia. Two were rescued the next day while the other three found another boat, put water and biscuits on board, and launched it. The three boats with their 24 men aboard headed for Newcastle. On 29 August, one of the boats, with eight men on board, separated from the other two in a gale and was never seen again. The survivors reached Newcastle on 8 September, and Port Jackson on 13 September 1806.
