= Alexander Champion (Senior) =

London based merchant

Alexander Champion (snr) was a London based merchant who was in business in the eighteenth century, trading to many parts of the world, with a number of partners over the years.

Alexander was born around 1725, the son of another Alexander Champion and his wife Mary. His ancestors came to London from Berkshire in the early eighteenth century. He was the father of another Alexander Champion (a businessman) who succeeded him in both business and whaling

== A London-based merchant ==
In 1742, he was taken on as partner in Samuel Storke’s firm and headed up the firm in 1753 when Samuel Storke died of a sudden stroke. The firm was based at Great Ayliffe Street, Goodman’s Field. In 1764, he left that firm and went into business with a new partner, Thomas Dickason, who was still his partner at the time of his death, at 117 Bishopsgate. Champion and Dickason had considerable trade with America and, it seems, Rhode Island and Boston in particular. In 1773, they are said to have sent the tea cargoes that were dumped in Boston Harbour in the Boston Tea Party.

In 1778, Alexander Champion was listed as an underwriter in Lloyd’s Register. He retired in 1789. He died on 28 April 1795 at his home in Walthamstow, Essex.

== Family ==
Alexander Champion married a wife called Christiana who died in January 1770. They had at least six sons and a daughter, as noted in his will.

I. Alexander Champion (businessman) was born on 11 November 1751 and died on 6 April 1809
II. Benjamin was born in 1753. He was a merchant, resident of New Broad Street, London, when he died on 13 June 1817
III. Samuel was a merchant also resident in New Broad Street, London and also died in 1817
IV. William was resident of Walthamstow, Essex, at the time of his death in 1819
V. James
VI. Thomas served in the Honourable United East India Company at Bombay and was resident in London at his death in 1796
I. Mary, baptised in 1758 at the Presbyterian chapel in Goodmans Field

His second wife was Sarah Fuller whom he married on 6 April 1771 at St Martin Outwich, London. She died after May 1777.
