= Enderby Plain =

Abyssal plain located off the coast of Enderby Land, East Antarctica

Enderby Plain Enderby Abyssal Plaine, East Abyssal Plain
- Abyssal plain
- Interactive map of Enderby Plain
- Location: East Antarctica (Enderby Land and Queen Maud Land)
- Etymology: Enderby Brothers

Enderby Plain (also known as Enderby Abyssal Plain or East Abyssal Plain) (60°S 40°E) is an undersea plain (or abyssal plain), located off the coast of Enderby Land and Queen Maud Land, East Antarctica. The name was approved by the U.S. Board on Geographic Names Advisory Committee on Undersea Features in June 1988.

This submarine terrain feature is named after the Enderby Brothers, owners of a 19th-century whaling company based in London, England. The company sponsored several expeditions to Antarctica in the mid-19th century.
