= Alexander Champion (businessman) =

Merchant and whaler (1751–1809)

Alexander Champion (jnr) (11 November 1751 – 6 April 1809) was a London-based merchant and was active as a whaler in the late 18th century. His father was especially significant in the history of whaling in the United Kingdom. The Champion family was from Berkshire and moved to London in the early 18th century.

== The father of British whaling ==
Alexander Champion was heavily involved with his partners in whaling and is credited as “the founder of British whaling” about 1775. An embargo had been placed on whale oil exports from New England in 1775, as a result of the American Revolutionary War. Samuel Enderby was Alexander's business partner, and he elected to pursue the whaling trade in the South Atlantic. When James Cook returned to Britain from his voyage into the South Atlantic in 1775, during which he crossed the Antarctic Circle for the first time, he reported that the seas were full of whales and seals. This was timely. Samuel Enderby founded the Samuel Enderby & Sons company the following year, when he and his business partners Alexander Champion and John St. Barbe assembled a fleet of twelve whaling vessels on the Greenwich Peninsula, in the London Borough of Greenwich.

By November 1784 Alexander Champion had accepted to deal with US whaler Francis Rotch and Mary Hayley (widow of two of Alexander's father's partners), possibly to accept from Rotch sea otter furs from Nootka Sound. In 1786 Alexander Champion and his brother Benjamin sent the first British whaler, The Triumph, east of the Cape of Good Hope. Later in 1786, in the Council Chamber at Whitehall, Samuel Enderby and Alexander Champion and others, were examined regarding the southern whale-fishery. They were asked whether they had any reason to believe that great quantities of Spermaceti whales might be found east of the Cape, and they replied: “Yes, we have very good information from captains and mates of East Indiamen." In proof of it they produced ‘quantities of ambergris which is part of the dung of the whales.’ This is a quaint way of expressing the nature of ambergris which is worth more than its weight in gold. Ambergris is a waxy substance secreted by the sperm whale used in making perfumes. In his whaling exploits he was often referred to together with his brother Benjamin.

== A prominent personality in London ==
In the 1780s he was recorded as living at 3, Great Winchester Street, London. Alexander Champion was a London alderman. He was also one of the directors of the Bank of England, and of the London Dock Company. Alexander died on 6 April 1809 at his house on Battersea-rise, Surrey, after two days illness, having been taken ill at the Bank on the 4th. He was buried in Bromley, Kent.

== Family ==
He married Ann Platt on 8 February 1774 also at St Martin Outwich, London. Ann outlived Alexander by many years and died on 8 April 1837 in her 85th year.

Alexander and Ann had four daughters

I. Ann born in 1775 in London, baptised at St Peter Le Poer on 29 March 1775 – she died on 9 February 1788

II. Harriet was born on 1 March 1776 and died on 10 Nov 1814. She married Rev Thomas Streatfeild the antiquarian

III Maria was born on 8 February 1778 and one reference says she died 10 May 1822 though another she was still alive in 1861 census!

IV Elizabeth was born 21 February 1781 and died on 26 June 1870.

== Ancestry ==
Ancestors of Alexander Champion (businessman)

16. John Champion
8. George Champion
17. Mary Pleydell
4. Alexander Champion
9. Marjory
2. Alexander Champion
5. Mary Sward
1. Alexander Champion
6. William Cook
3. Christiana Cook
7. Martha
