= Whaling in the United Kingdom =

Commercial hunting of whales in the United Kingdom

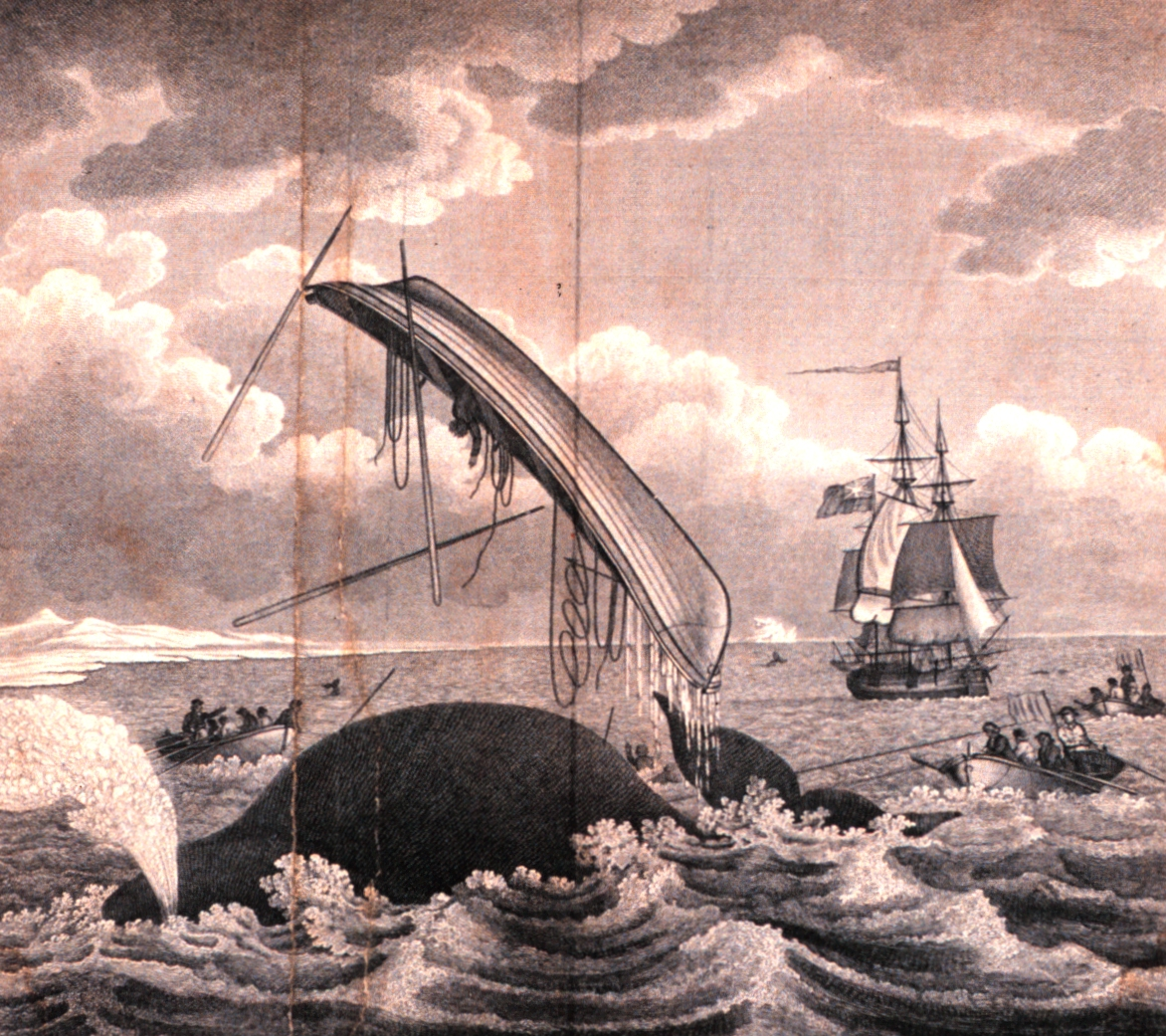
Dangers of the Whale Fishery, 1820. One whaleboat is up-ended, and another has a taut line, showing that the whale it harpooned may take the sailors on a Nantucket sleighride.

Commercial whaling in Great Britain began late in the 16th century and continued after the 1801 formation of the United Kingdom and intermittently until the middle of the 20th century.

The trade was broadly divided into two branches. The northern fishery involved hunting the bowhead whale off the coast of Greenland and adjacent islands. The southern fishery was activity anywhere else, including in the Atlantic, Pacific and Indian Oceans and off the Antarctic. The sperm whale, the southern right whale and humpback whale were the main target species in South Sea whaling. The industry went on to become a profitable national enterprise and a source of skilled mariners for the Royal Navy in times of war.

Modern whaling, using factory ships and catchers fitted with bow-mounted cannons that fired explosive harpoons, continued into the 20th century and was mainly focused on the Antarctic and nearby islands where shore stations had been established. The collapse of whale stocks in the 1960s, due to overfishing, saw the UK abandon the industry after three and a half centuries of involvement.

== Early history ==
Stranded whales, or drift whales that died at sea and washed ashore, provided meat, oil (rendered from blubber) and bone to coastal communities in pre-historic Britain. A 5,000 year old whalebone figurine was one of the many items found in the Neolithic village of Skara Brae in Scotland after that Stone Age settlement was uncovered by a storm in the 1850s. Whalebone weaving combs from the middle and late Iron Age have been found on archaeological digs in Orkney and Somerset.

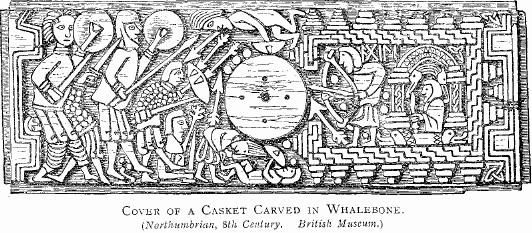
The carved lid of a whalebone casket, Northumbria, 8th century, British Museum

A charter granted to Hilary, Bishop of Chichester in 1148 gave him the right to "any whale found on the land of the church of Chichester, except the tongue, which is the King's." The English king had asserted the right to the entire whale by 1315 when Edward II reserved "to himself the right of all whales cast by chance upon the shore." Whales came to be known as "Royal fish", the disposal of which was an exclusive right of the monarch, or his local representative. Indeed, to this day, the Crown Estate asserts that "theoretically The king can claim ownership" of beached whales and other "Royal fish".

The first tentative interest in commercial whaling may have occurred in 1576 when a British vessel sailed "to the country called Labrador, which joins Newfoundland, where the Biscay men go in search of whales." The Basques had whaled in the Bay of Biscay from the twelfth century and by the middle of the sixteenth century were crossing the Atlantic each year to the coast of Labrador and Newfoundland where they established temporary whaling settlements. Sustained British interest in the trade began in 1577 when the Muscovy Company in London was granted a Crown monopoly to hunt whales "within any seas whatsoever." It may have been further stimulated when in 1579, for political reasons, parliament banned whale oil imports from the Spanish Basque country, the main exporters of whale oil.

== The northern whale fishery ==
A vessel owned by the London-based Muscovy Company discovered in 1610 and began to exploit the Spitsbergen (Svalbard) whaling grounds in 1611. By 1617 at least fifteen British vessels were whaling off Spitsbergen each season. Ongoing participation in the fishery proved elusive. It was due, in part, to costly competition between rival chartered companies as they tried to exclude each other, and their foreign rivals, from the region. In the meantime, the Dutch had entered the fishery and soon became dominant. By the 1660s, there were hundreds of Dutch and German vessels active off Spitsbergen, while in some years not a single British vessel.

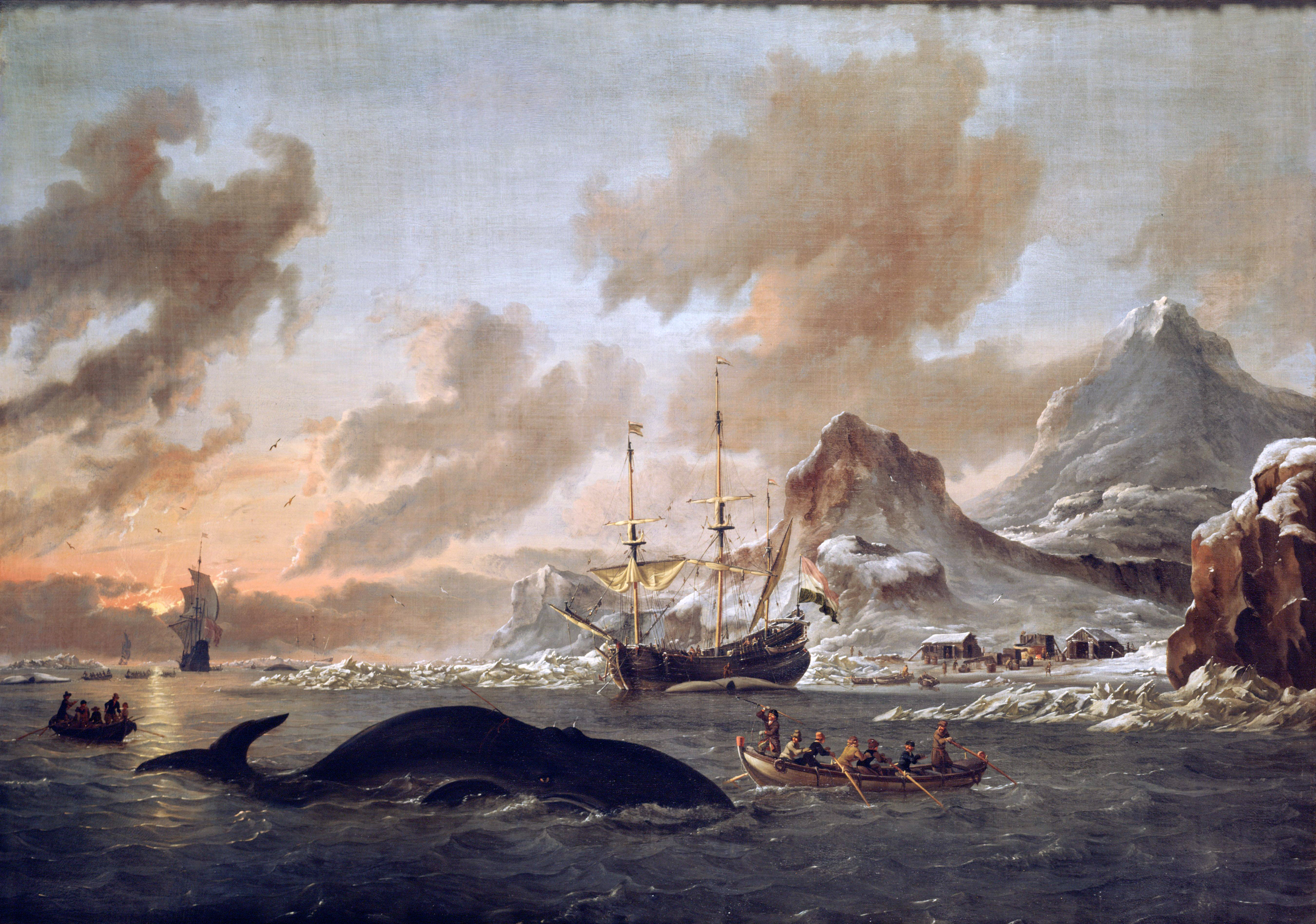
Whaling off the Coast of Spitsbergen, by Abraham Storck

Parliament tried to revive British involvement late in the 17th century. It began with the Trade Act 1672 (25 Cha. 2. c. 7) that allowed British whaling crews to be composed of up to half foreign nationals, such as the skilled Dutch. The act also exempted British-caught oil from customs duty, and imposed a £9 a tun duty on oil and £18 on "whale fins" (baleen) imported from other national fleets. It was not till Dutch involvement began to falter in the 1690s, due to political turmoil and warfare in Holland, that the British saw an opportunity, which led to the creation of the Greenland Company. The initiative was unsuccessful and the losses incurred were so large they discouraged further British involvement in the trade till the 1720s, when Henry Elking persuaded the South Sea Company to try the Spitsbergen fishery. Two dozen new vessels were built and equipped and sent forth under the direction of Elking as agent and superintendent for the Greenland Fishery on a salary of £100 a year plus 1.5% of gross sales. This initiative too was unsuccessful and spelled the end of chartered company involvement in the trade in Britain.

Parliament wanted to revive whaling to reduce the trade imbalance with Holland and at the same time build up a naval reserve of ships and men that could be easily mobilised in times of war. The Whale Fishery Act 1732 (6 Geo. 2. c. 33) offered an annual bounty of twenty shillings (one pound sterling) a ton for all whaling vessels over 200 tons fitted out in Great Britain, the relevant legislation coming into force in 1733. The bounty was increased to thirty shillings a ton in 1740, but even then only four or five British vessels sailed north each year. Most of these were owned by merchants who imported whale oil.

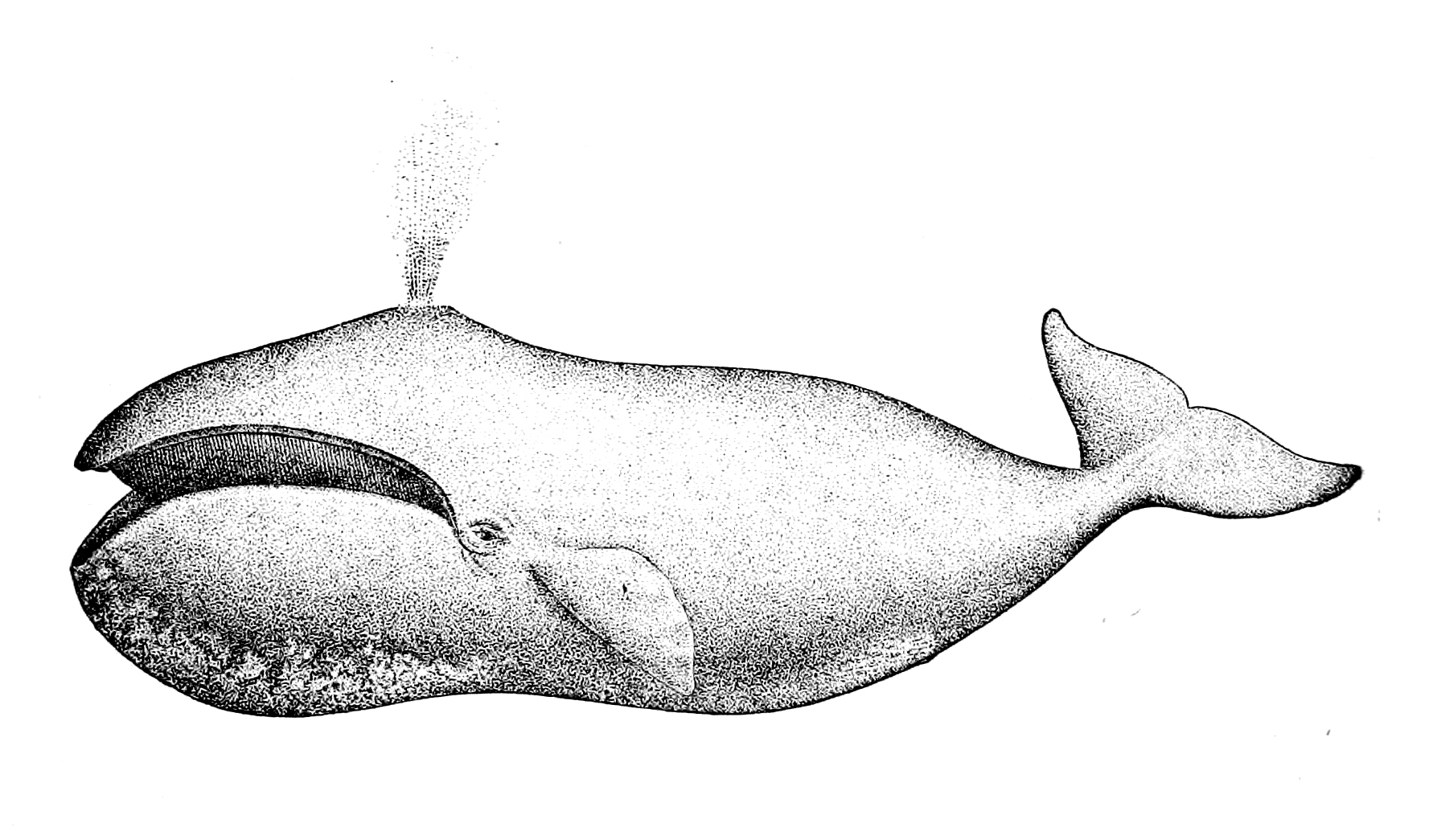
Drawing of an adult bowhead whale

The government increased the bounty to forty shillings a ton in 1750 and this proved the tipping point for a take off in the trade. Just two ships were fitted out in 1749, increasing to twenty in 1750, and eighty-three by 1756. The forty shillings a ton bounty represented a subsidy of £600 for the average-sized 300-ton ship in the trade. Also important was a jump in demand for whale oil. The manufacture of woollen textiles was increasing and right whale oil was widely used to clean wool before it was spun. The Industrial Revolution needed lubricants for machinery, and growing urbanization increased the demand for lamp fuel, including in street lighting. London was the best lit city in the world, with 5,000 street lamps by the 1740s. The building industry also used whale oil as an ingredient in paint, varnish and putty. All of this increase in demand led to a rise in price. The average wholesale price was £14 7s a tun early in the 1740s and this rose to £27 a tun in 1754. At the same time Dutch had started to withdraw from the fishery.

Scottish ports were well placed to participate in the growth of the fleet. They were closer to the northern whaling grounds and sent forth more whalers to the Arctic than English outports early in this revival of interest in the trade. Scottish ports involved in the trade, in order of importance, were, Leith, Dunbar, Borrowstounness (Bo'ness), Dundee, Aberdeen, Montrose, Glasgow, Anstruther, Greenock, Kirkcaldy and Alloa.

London remained the single most important port dispatching 71% of British whalers in 1753. Other English ports involved include Hull (from 1598), Newcastle (1752), Whitby (1753), Exeter (1754), Ipswich (1786) and Peterhead (1788). Additional English and Welsh ports participating during the "bounty period" (1733–1824) were Berwick, Bristol, Dartmouth, Grimsby, Liverpool, Lynn, Milford, Scarborough, Stockton, Sunderland, Whitehaven and Yarmouth.

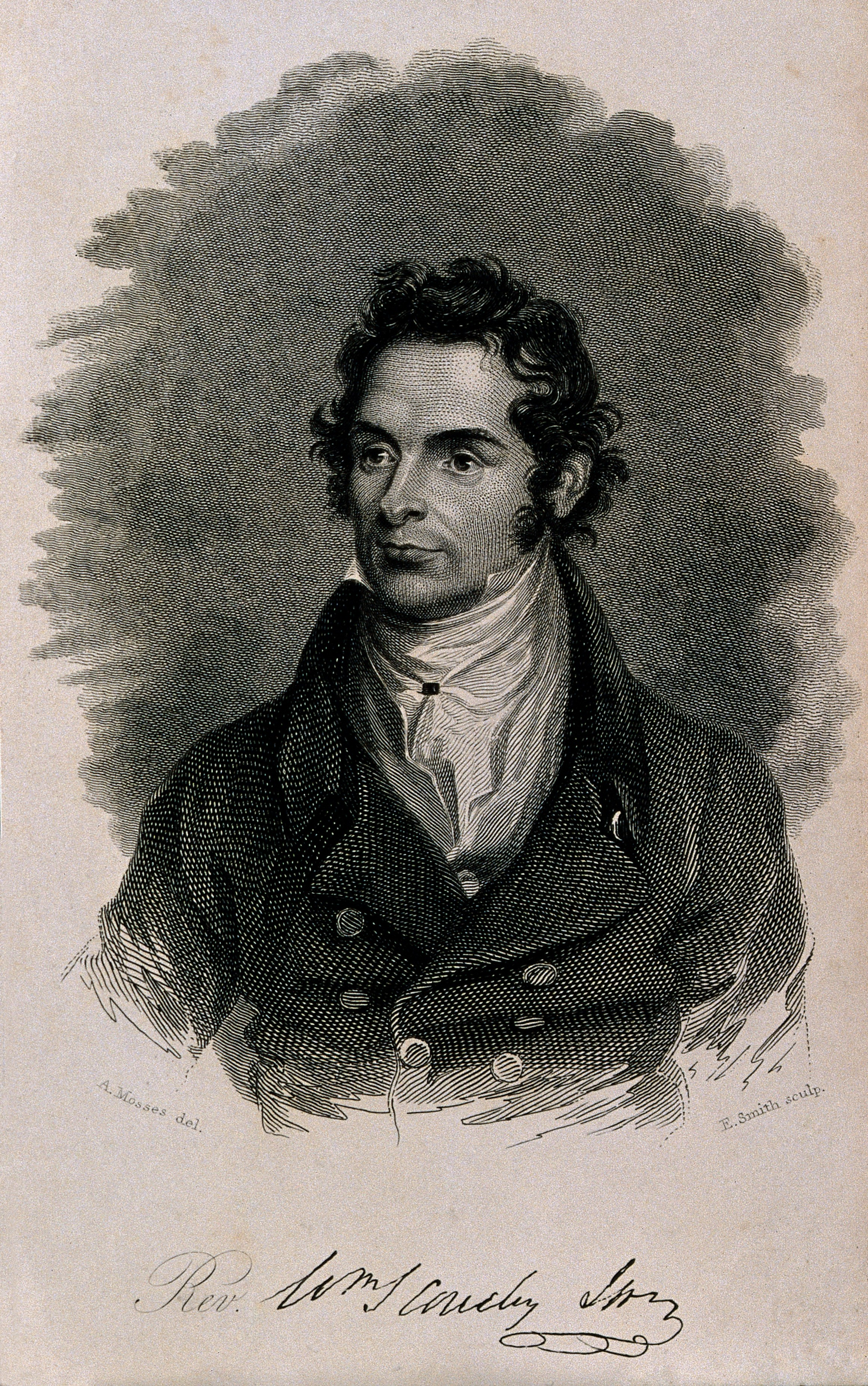
Captain William Scoresby jnr. (1789–1857) was a noted Arctic whaler, explorer, scientist, author and clergyman.

There were setbacks along the way. These included war in Europe in 1756, which saw the crews of some northern whalers depleted by the press-gangs, regardless of exemptions granted to harpooners, line-managers and boatsteerers A fall in the price of oil at the same time also impacted the industry and led shipowners to leave the trade. There were eighty-three vessels involved in 1759, and just forty when the war ended in 1763. Whaling remained at a low ebb for the next decade with some ports, such as Whitby and Hull, leaving the trade entirely for a time. Numbers slowly increased till there were fifty vessels involved by 1770.

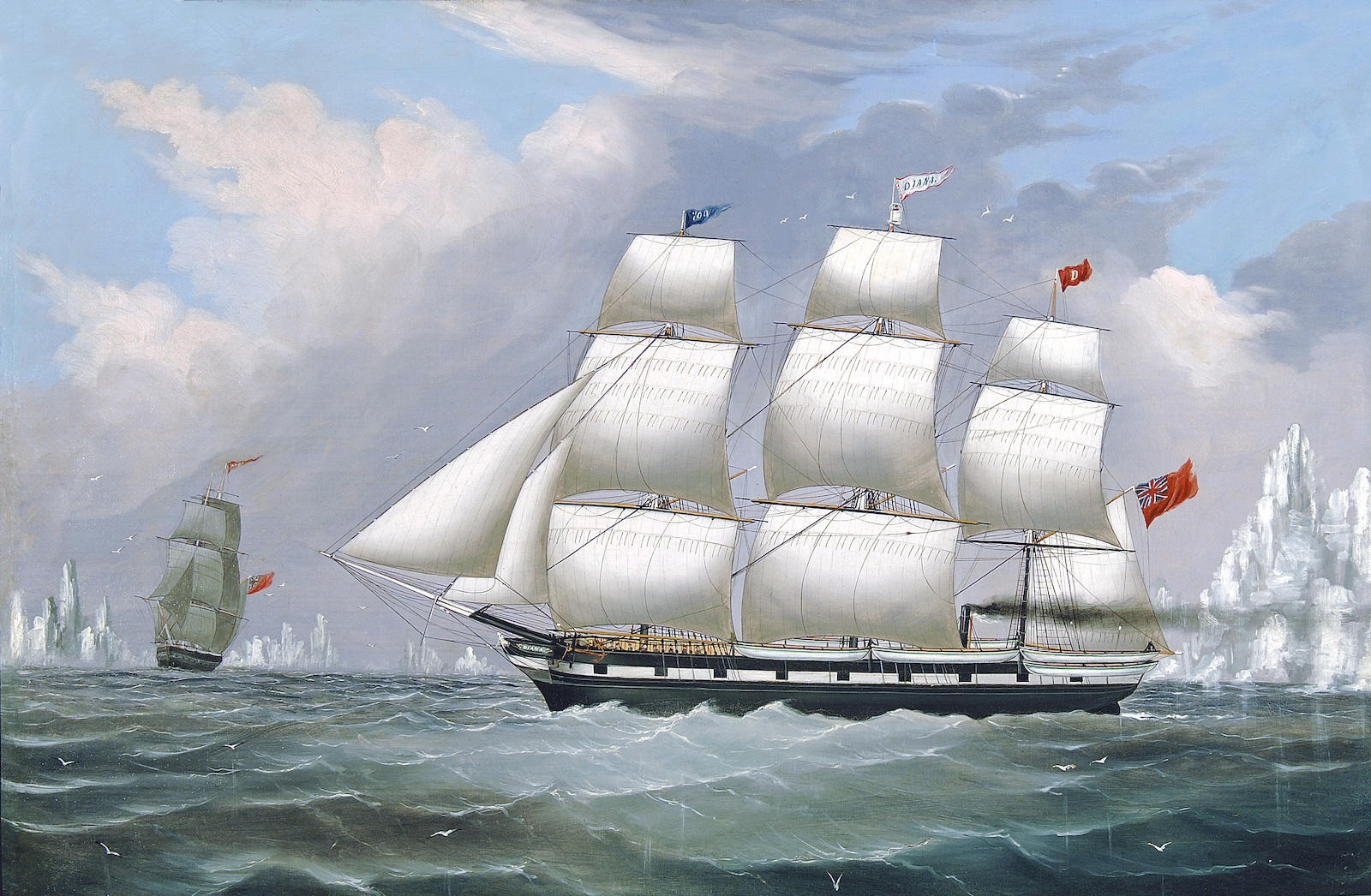
Whaling ships Diana and Anne in the Arctic, James H. Wheldon (1830–1895)

The American Revolutionary War (1775–1783) acted as another break on northern whaling. When peace came in 1783 it was followed by an expansion in the British economy and a renewed demand for whale oil. America had been a major supplier to Britain, especially of sperm whale oil. Britain started to participate in the sperm whale fishery in 1775 and imposed a heavy duty on oil imported from elsewhere. The high tariff barrier remained after peace was declared and acted as an accelerant to British involvement in South Sea whaling. British activity in the Arctic also began to increase. The number of Greenland whalers rose from 44 in 1782 to 102 in 1784. The Greenland fishery peaked in 1786–1788 when 250 British vessels were involved with an aggregate tonnage of 73,000 and employing about 10,000 men. Those vessels came from 23 different ports, with London alone sending 91 vessels, followed by Hull with 36 and Whitby and Newcastle with twenty each. The year 1788 was also one of massive loss with the fleet as a whole recording a deficit of £199,371, the London vessels by themselves losing £40,000. Vessels began to leave the trade and by 1790 only eleven ports were still involved.

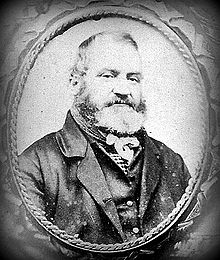
Captain John Parker (whaling master) (1803–1867) of Hull

The number of vessels involved in northern whaling slowly picked up as the turn of the century approached, largely unaffected by the French Revolutionary period and Napoleonic Wars. The price of oil and bone was volatile and the latter ranged in price from £400 a ton to just £30 between the 1760s and 1815. Prices began to improve as the new century progressed and the Davis Strait fishery began to develop. The size of the fleet peaked in 1821 after which it began a long slow decline that lasted until the end of the century.

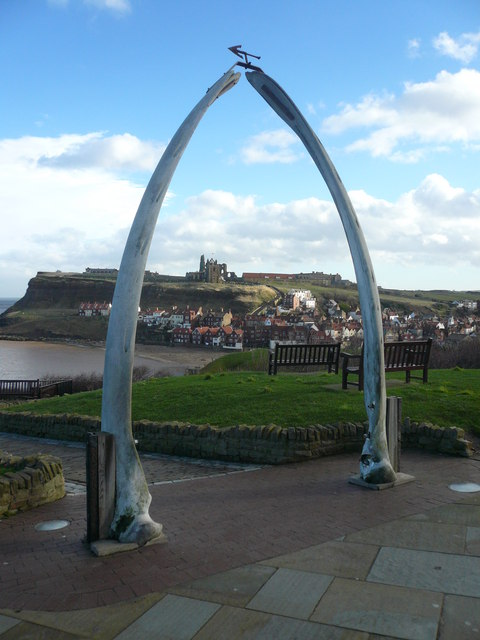
The whalebone arch on the West Cliff at Whitby commemorates the port's historic link with the whaling industry.

The decline began when the Board of Trade introduced free trade legislation that removed the bounty in 1824. Also significant was a fall in the price of whale oil to just £18 in 1820–21 season, in response to weak demand caused by a rise in imports of seed oil. More free trade legislation in 1844 saw the high duty on American-caught whale oil reduced from £27 18s 7d per tun to just £6 6s, and the duty on sperm oil fall to £15 15s. The duty reduction benefited consumers of whale oil but it exposed the whaling industry to the cold winds of competition, and it withered in response.

Poor seasons became more common as whale stocks declined, further hastening the exit from the industry. The vessels still engaged stayed longer on the whaling grounds to achieve better results and in the process were sometimes trapped by the ice. Forced to over-winter, some ships were crushed by the ice and their crewmen had to evacuate the ship. If there was no vessel nearby to take them aboard they would soon freeze to death. Even those taken aboard another vessel faced scurvy or starvation in crowded unsanitary conditions till the ice began to break up and the vessel could begin the journey home.

== The southern whale fishery ==
William John Huggins, "The ships Vigilant and Harpooner offshore", 1832

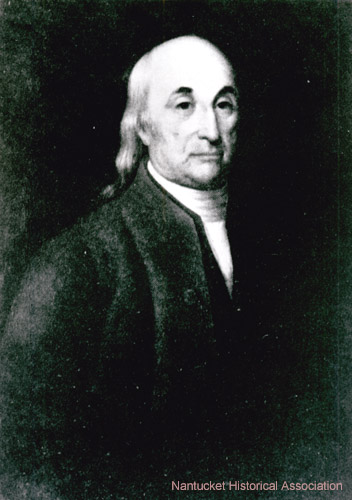
William Rotch senior (1734–1828), American owner of British South Sea whalers

Sperm whale oil – a valuable commodity worth two or three times more than northern right whale oil – had been imported from Britain's New England Colonies till the American War of Independence curtailed supply. This prompted British entrepreneurs, particularly those who had previously imported the oil, to send their own ships into the South Seas to obtain this high-value commodity. Ten whalers left Britain in 1775, including nine from London, and crossed the equator into the South Atlantic in search of sperm whales. London alone sent 76 whaling vessels into the south Atlantic between 1776 and 1783. British vessels went on to make around 2,500 voyages whaling and sealing voyages to the South Seas between 1775 and 1859. These voyages were made by over 930 vessels owned by 300 principal shipowners. Some of these vessels in the South Atlantic also engaged in clandestine trading on the coast of Brazil. A group of American Quaker whalers, led by William Rotch, senior (1734–1828) of Nantucket, then the hub of the American whaling industry, sought to evade British naval blockades of American ports, and the high duty on imported foreign whale oil, by relocating, first to France, and then to Britain. The Rotch family owned at least ten British South Sea whalers between 1775 and 1794.

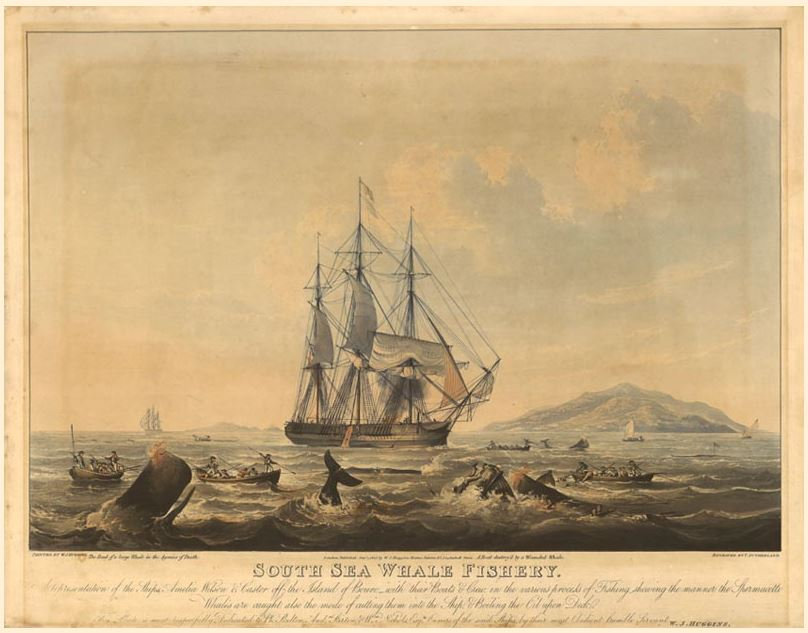
"South Sea Whale Fishery, Amelia Wilson and Castor off the Island of Buru," a coloured aquatint engraving by T. Sutherland of a painting by William John Huggins, 1825

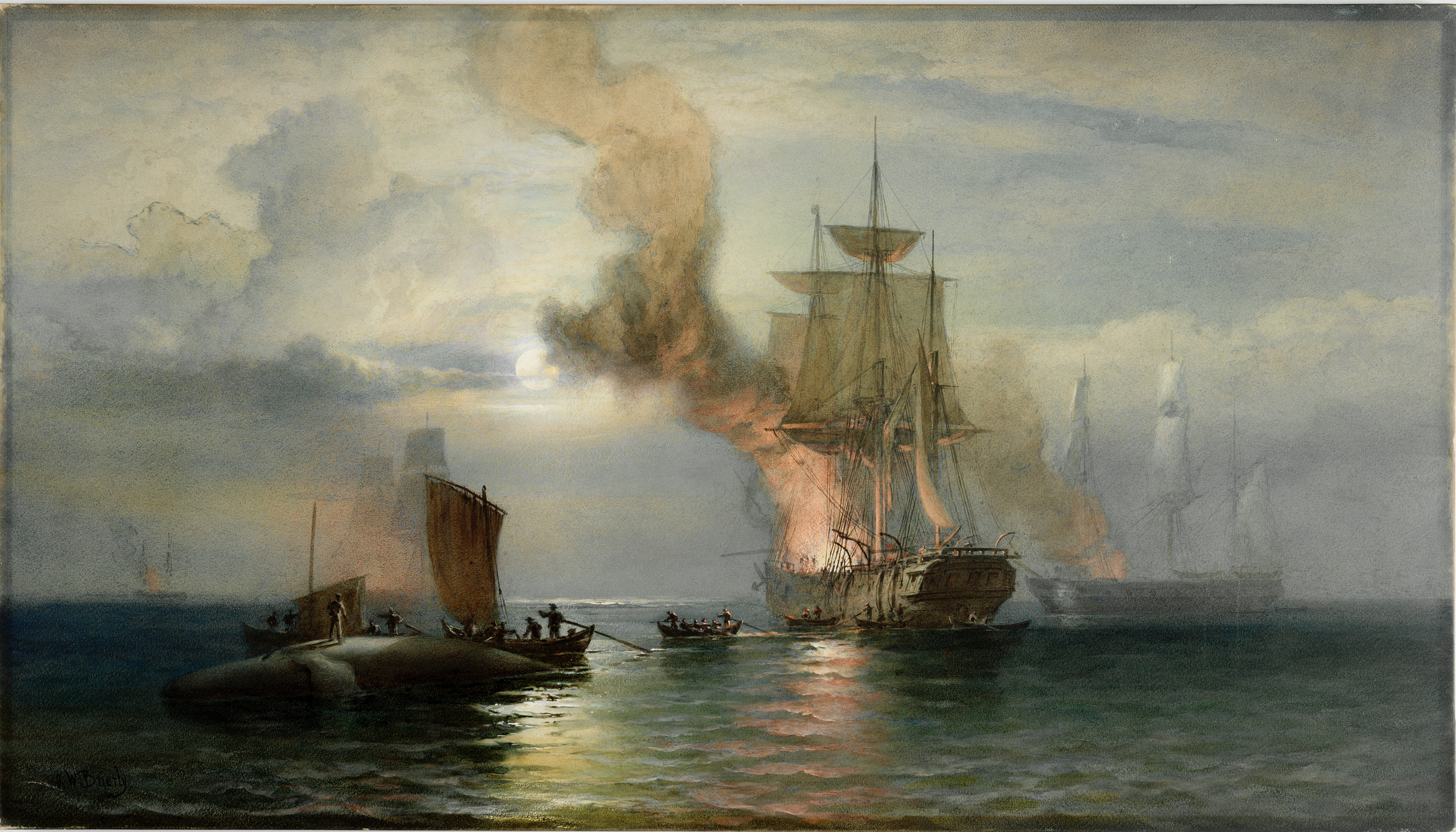
Oswald Brierly, South Sea whalers boiling blubber, c. 1876, Dixon Galleries, State Library of New South Wales

The British ships initially "fished" in the mid and south Atlantic, spreading into the Pacific and Indian Oceans in the 1780s. The government bounty of forty shillings a ton paid to northern whalers was extended to the southern fishery in 1776. A heavy import duty that applied to oil imported from other countries was not lifted even after hostilities between Britain and America ceased in 1783 and was an additional incentive for shipowners to remain involved in the trade. The first British whaler to enter the Pacific was the Emilia, owned by Samuel Enderby & Sons and commanded by Captain James Shields. This vessel sailed from London in September 1788 and fished the Peru Grounds before returning to London in March 1790 with 139 tons of sperm whale oil.

International conflict became inevitable, spilling over all the continents of the New World. Spain resented the intrusion of British vessels into the Pacific, especially when they engaged in clandestine trading at Spanish colonies in South America. In 1789, rising tension over the issue saw Spanish warships, thousands of miles away on the west coast of what is now Canada, seize British vessels engaged in the maritime fur trade in Nootka Sound on Vancouver Island. The resulting Nootka Crisis was an international incident that brought both nations to the brink of war. War was averted but tensions remained high. Australia was also in their sights. In 1793 a Spanish naval captain with recent knowledge of the area submitted a plan to invade New South Wales, destroy Sydney and carry away the 7,000 colonists to labour in Spain's own South American colonies.

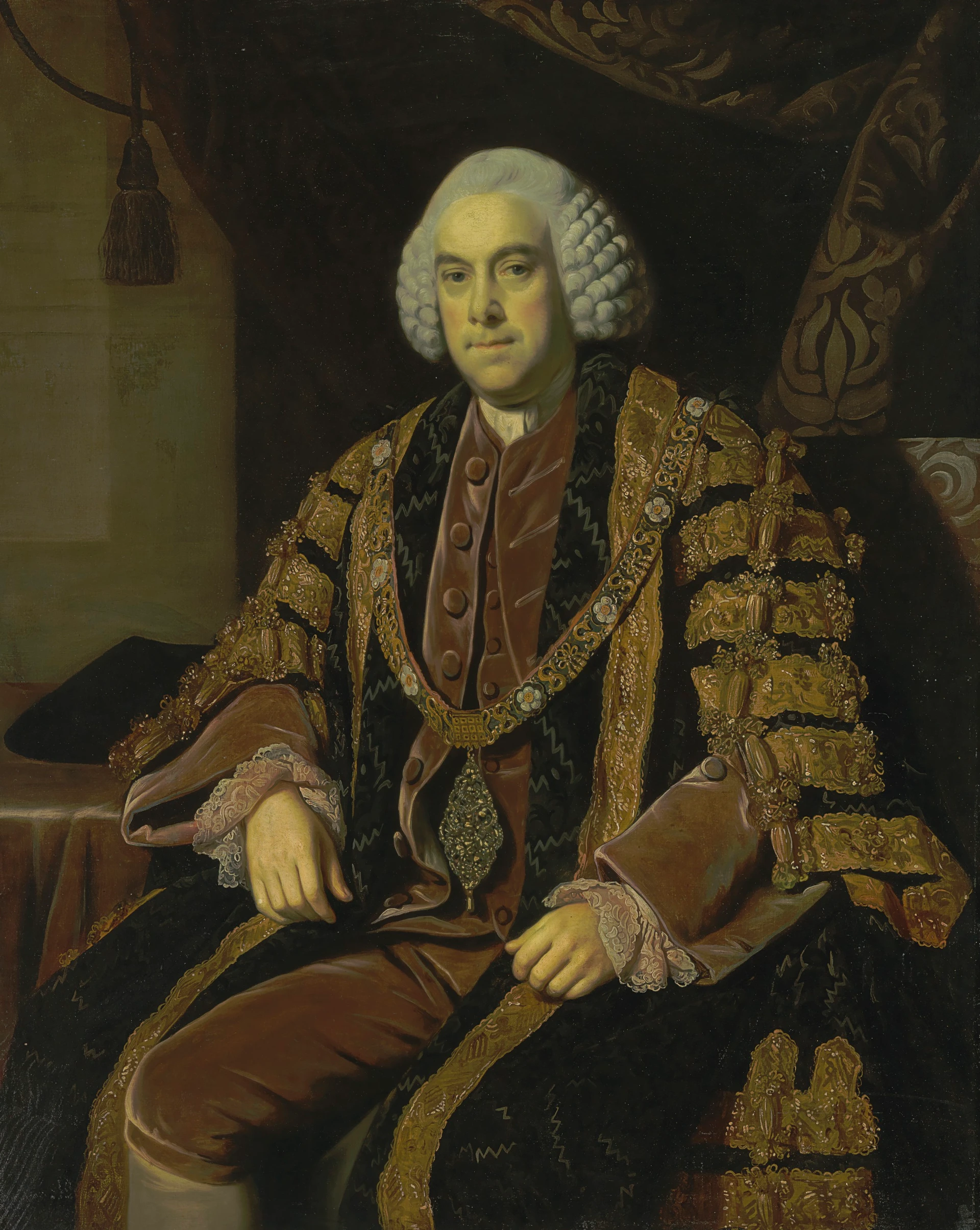
Sir Brook Watson (1735–1807) was a fourteen-year old apprentice seaman when a shark removed his lower right leg in 1749. He was later a British merchant, owner of South Sea whalers, Lord Mayor of London and member of parliament. He was made a baronet in 1803.

British whaling continued in the Pacific, with occasional setbacks along the way. These include the Anglo-French War (1778-1783), the Anglo-Spanish War (1796-1808) and the War of 1812 between Britain and the United States. These conflicts forced vessels to travel to and from the whaling grounds in convoys protected by Royal Navy warships. This was not always enough and in 1797 a number of the British whalers were captured when they called at ports on the coast of Chile and Peru for supplies, unaware that war had broken out between Spain and Britain. The US warship Essex captured a dozen British whalers in the Pacific in 1812, the loss in ships and cargo estimated at $2.5 million. As well as a problem, these conflicts also presented opportunities for British whalers. Many of them sailed for the Pacific with Letters of Marque obtained from the government, allowing them to attack, capture and plunder enemy-owned trading vessels.

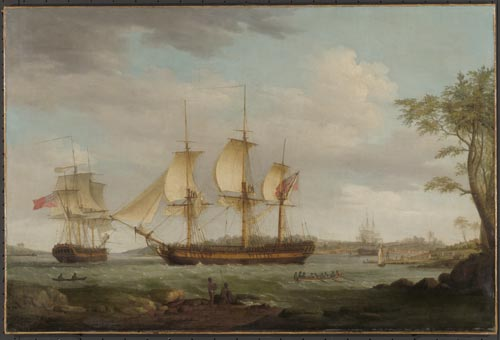
Thomas Whitcombe, "Departure of the whaler Britannia from Sydney Cove, 1798", National Library of Australia, Canberra

Another significant barrier to expansion were Crown monopolies granted to the East India Company and the South Sea Company which restricted British maritime activity in the Pacific and Indian Oceans to ships owned or licensed by the Companies. Pressure exerted by the London whaling lobby saw these restrictions gradually lifted between 1786 and 1813, after which British whalers had unrestricted access to all whaling grounds.

Some whaling shipowners, such as Samuel Enderby & Sons and Mather & Co., chartered their vessels to serve as convict transports and store ships to the Australian colonies on the outward voyage to the South Seas. Others took with them trade goods they sold in the colonies, or at ports in South America. Contraband trading at South American ports and bays could be lucrative but, if detected by the Spanish colonial authorities, might result in confiscation of the ship and a lengthy period of imprisonment for the crews.

In the years between 1800 and 1809 the British South Sea whaling fleet averaged 72 vessels with 30 ships returning each year. The annual average catch during this period was 1,634 tuns of sperm and 3,300 tuns of southern right whale oil, with an average annual value of £122,000. British involvement in the South Seas fishery reached its peak, in terms of the number of vessels involved, in the years between 1820 and 1822. The end of subsidy payments in 1824 played a part in the decline, as did the reduction in the duty on imported foreign-caught oil in 1843, and its total abolition in 1849. A decline in whale stocks was also a significant factor and caused a steady increase in the length of voyages. By 1843, only 36 vessels were still involved in the trade, and just 20 by 1850. The last British vessel involved in South Sea whaling in the Age of Sail was the Cowlitz (Captain Bushell) which returned to London in 1859. As well as the Enderby family, other prominent shipowners in the southern whale fishery included Daniel Bennett, Alexander Champion, John St Barbe and Thomas Sturge.

== Modern whaling ==
The development of harpoons went hand in hand with the development of commercial whaling. Harpoon guns were trialed by the South Sea Company in 1737 and hand-held guns that discharged rocket harpoons were in general use by American and other national whalers in the second half of the 19th century. Further experimentation at that period by Svend Foyn at Tonsberg in Norway resulted in a safer and more efficient harpoon cannon that was patented in 1870. These cannon were mounted on the bow of steam-powered metal-hulled catchers and allowed faster whale species to be hunted. The introduction of factory ships that could winch the captured whales up a stern ramp and onto the deck meant further advances in efficiency and safety for those employed in the industry.

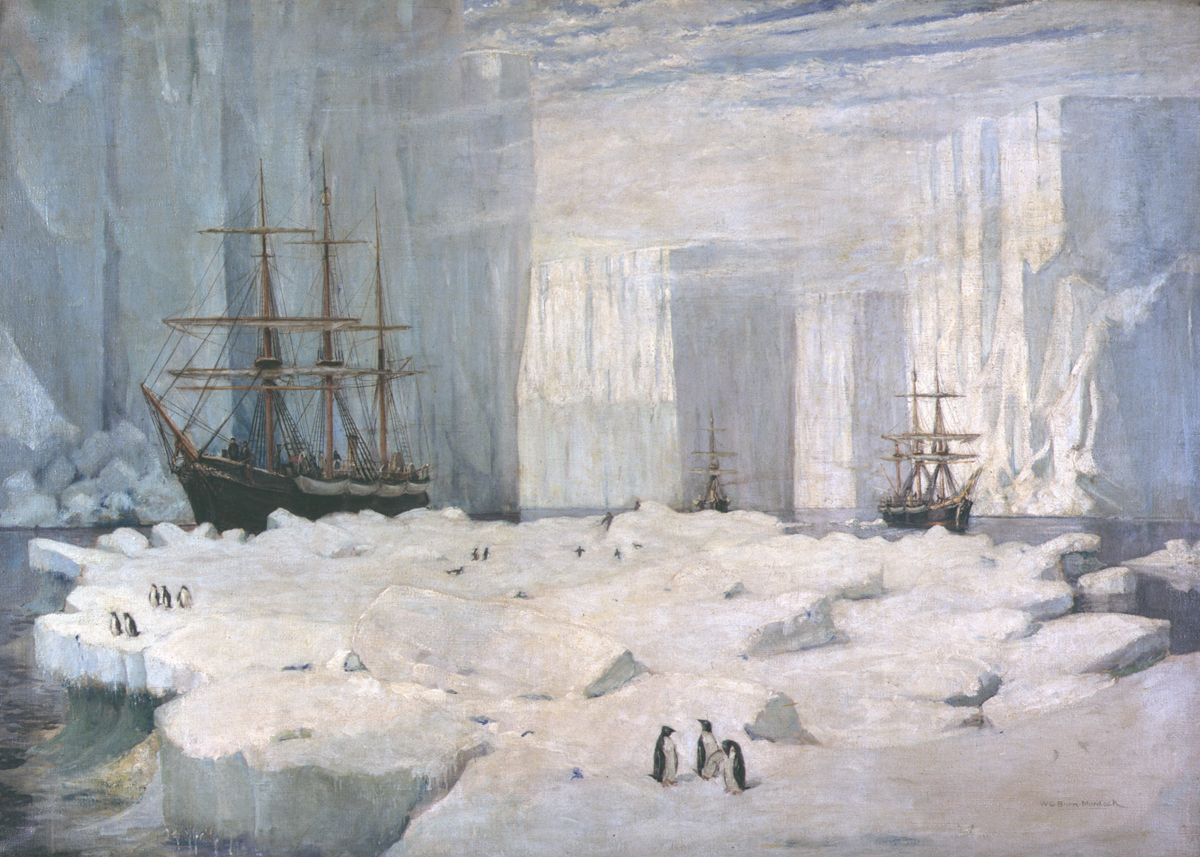
The Dundee Antarctic Whaling Expedition by William Gordon Burn Murdoch

Modern whaling in Britain can be dated from 1904, when Norwegian expatriate Christian Salvesen at Leith in Scotland established the Olna Whaling Company. Shore-based whaling stations established at Olna Firth and elsewhere in Scotland were highly productive, taking 2,418 Fin and 1,283 Sei whales between 1908 and 1914, inclusive. After the oil was extracted, the meat and bone was ground into a meal used as an animal food supplement. Salvesen later established other stations at Thorvig in the Faroe Islands and at Hellisford in Iceland. Modern whaling methods soon depleted whaling stocks in European waters and companies began to look further afield. The Dundee whaling expedition set out from Scotland and ventured to the Antarctic in 1892–93 to look for whaling grounds that might be worth fishing.

The settlement at Grytviken was established on 16 November 1904 by the Norwegian sea captain Carl Anton Larsen, as a whaling station for his Compañía Argentina de Pesca (Argentine Fishing Company). There were nineteen whaling firms in the region by 1914, most of them owned or staffed by Norwegians. Christian Salvesen established a new whaling company in 1908 which began operations at West Falkland in January 1909 and, later in the year, at South Georgia. The latter operation was based at Leith Harbour and it continued to function till the 1960s. The official language there was Norwegian, indicating the main source of labour. A second British firm, the Southern Whaling and Sealing Company of North Shields, was established in 1911 to operate at Prince Olav Harbour on South Georgia.

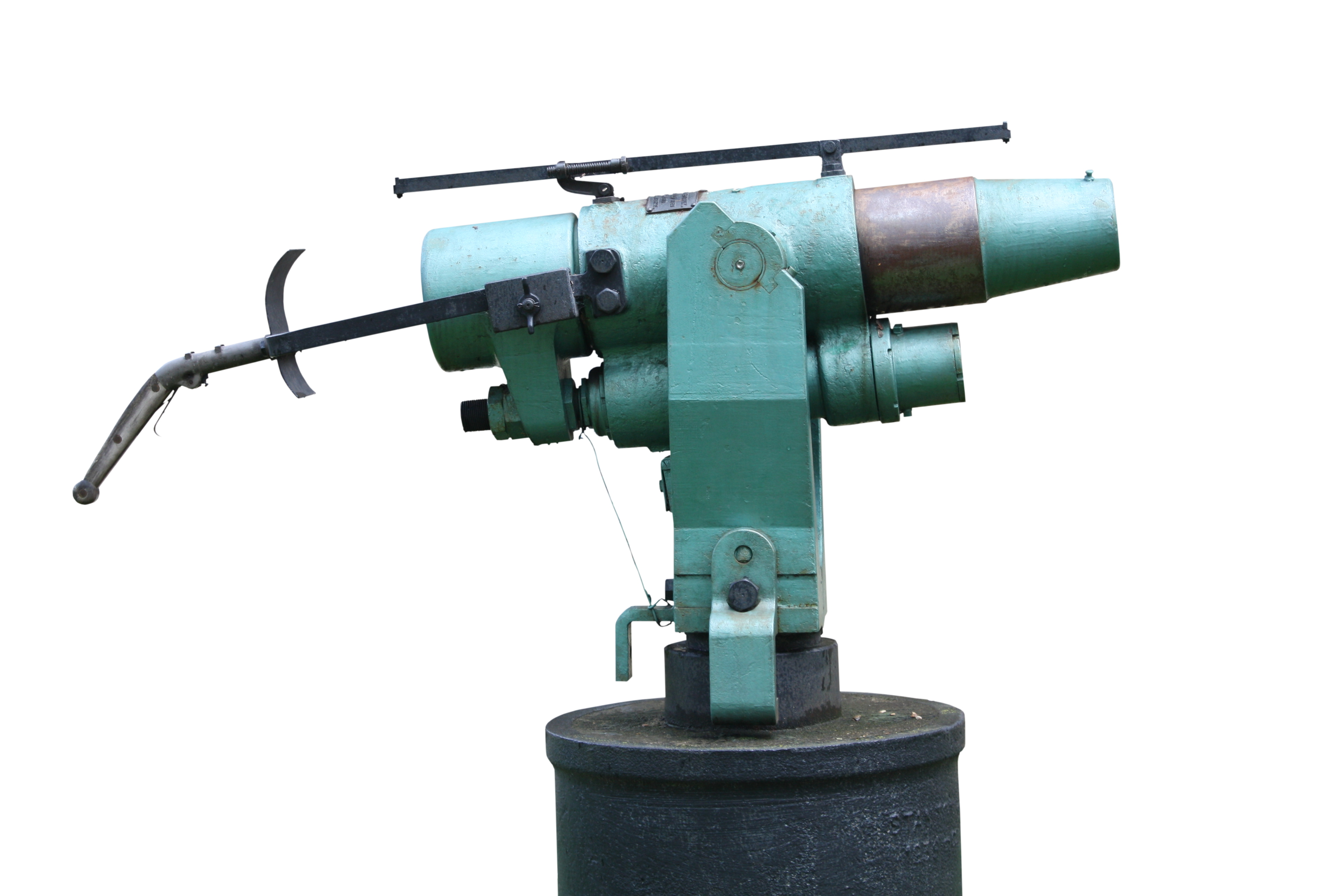
Harpoon cannon outside the Scott Polar Research Institute, Cambridge

Old merchant vessels of 2000–3000 tons were brought into service as rudimentary factory ships by the Norwegians in 1905, and by the British in 1911. These vessels allowed the whole whale to be processed with less waste. The start of World War I led to an increased demand for whaling products, and catches by the two British firms in the Antarctic increased in response. Advances in hydrogenation allowed the oil from baleen whales to be hardened to make margarine, a substitute for butter, in short supply due to the war. The hardened whale oil was also used to make soap, with Lever Brothers the major user of whale oil in Britain.

A major event in the post-war years was the purchase of the Southern Whaling Company by Lever Brothers for £360,000 in September 1919. The Southern Whaling and Sealing Company and Christian Salvesen were the two main producers of whale oil from shore-based whaling stations and floating factory ships in the Antarctic in the early 1920s. Other significant developments were the introduction of larger catchers, that could range further, and a switch in target species from fin whales to blue whales.

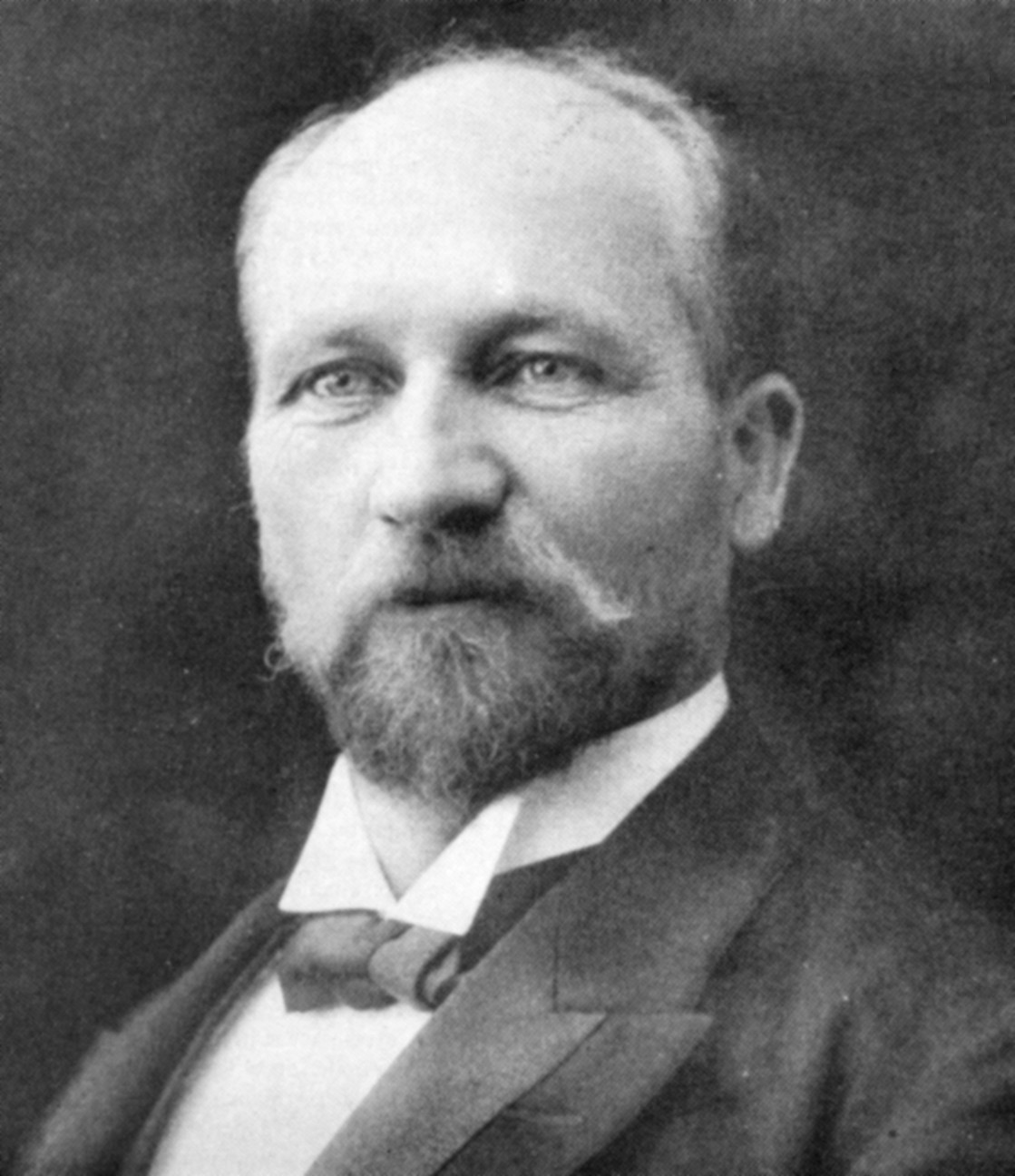
Captain Carl Anton Larsen (1860–1924)

The depletion of South Georgia waters by the 1920s saw British companies invest in new factory ships that could be sent to whaling grounds further afield during the brief three month long Antarctic whaling season. The waters around the South Shetland Islands and South Orkney Islands were tried but the major development in the 1920s was the discovery by the Norwegian, Captain Carl Anton Larsen in the 1923–24 season, of a passage through the pack ice to the ice-free waters of the Ross Sea. The difficult conditions in the Ross Sea called for larger factory ships and more powerful catchers. Christian Salvesen took delivery of six new catchers in 1924, the first of forty catchers commissioned and built at Middlesbrough for them during the inter-war years. The profits in the industry saw the creation of a third British firm in 1928, the Hector Whaling Company, with a nominal capital of £250,000.

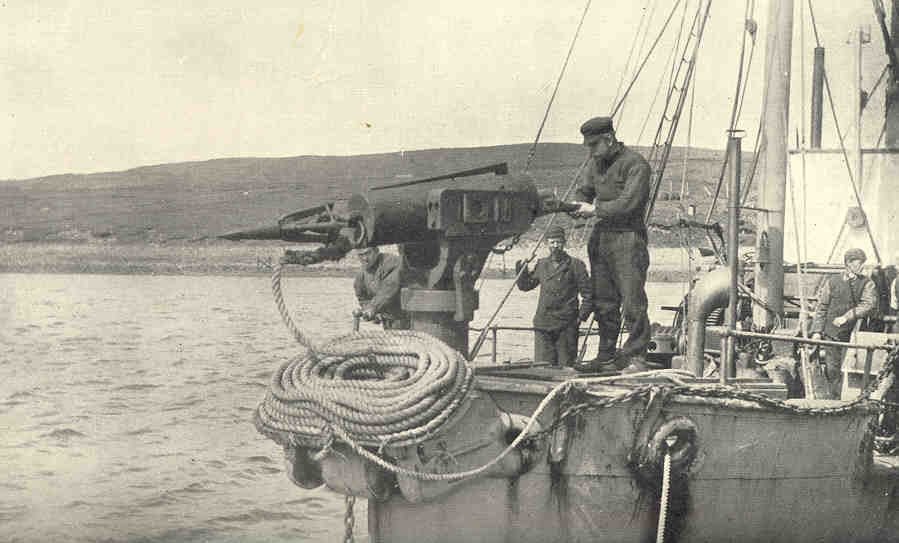
Photo from circa 1920, showing a whaling cannon loaded with a harpoon and ready to fire

An increase in the number of factory ships from 17 to 41, most of them deployed to the Ross Sea, saw total world whale oil production explode from 145,394 tons in 1926–27 to 601,392 tons in the 1930–31 season, while the British component went from 61,781 tons to 120,533 tons during the same period. This massive oversupply led to a rise in inventories and a dramatic fall in price which resulted in the decision by the Norwegians to keep their vessels in port for the 1931–32 season. British producers responded by closing two unprofitable shore-based stations in Scotland and another in South Africa.

Continued overfishing and the resulting depletion of whale stocks in Antarctic waters turned thoughts to greater regulation and how the industry might be made sustainable. Efforts were made to further limit the length of the whaling season and quotas were introduced on the number of whales that could be taken. More effective in limiting the catch was the ongoing surplus of oil in storage and the resulting low price that continued to restrict the number of factory ships at sea. This continued until 1935, when a rise in the price of oil saw an increase in the number of ships to sail. Some of these "fished" the whaling grounds off Western Australia, Peru and Madagascar. The old cycle was soon repeated with overproduction and the inevitable crash in the oil price.

The oil surplus of the 1935–36 season was the result of good weather in the Antarctic and the activity of new whaling factories and catchers, including some from Japan, Germany and Denmark, new entrants into modern whaling. It also reflected the creation of a number of new small whaling companies in Britain during the 1930s. These included Anglo-Norse Ltd, Polar Whaling Company and Star Whaling. There were still nine British shore-based whaling stations operating in the 1930s. To maintain production levels, the target species broadened, with fin, humpback and sperm whales taken in increasing numbers. Even so, on the eve of world war in 1939 the industry was facing difficult times with declining whale stocks, rising costs and falling demand as manufacturers switched to whale oil substitutes, such as palm oil.

The Second World War devastated the whaling industry. The European market for British-caught oil disappeared almost overnight. But a new market opened up as the British government began to buy and stockpile any whale oil they could lay their hands on. When the Minister of Food, Sir Frederick Marquis heard rumours the Germans were negotiating to buy whale oil from the Norwegians, to be made into margarine, he made contact with the traders and agreed the first price quoted and bought their entire stock and had it transported to Britain. Whale catchers and factory ships were requisitioned for military purposes and a number were sunk by enemy action. Whale numbers around the world recovered slightly during the conflict. When the Second World War ended, the war on the whales began again.

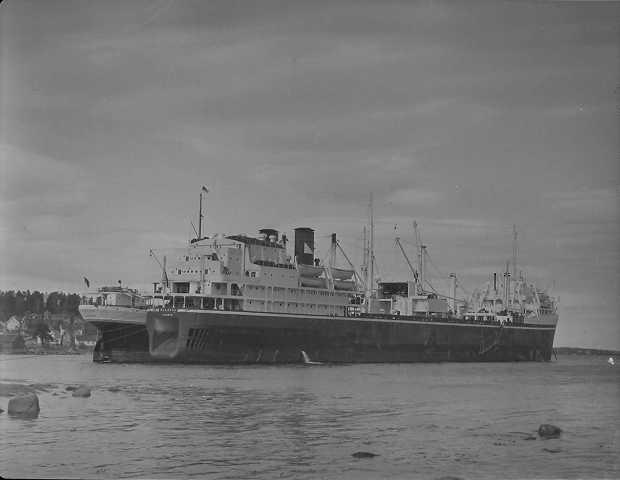
The British whaling factory ship Balaena, May 1949, was operated by the Hector Whaling Company.

An urgent need for edible oils of all kinds in the post-war period saw the price of whale oil reach £100 a ton on several occasions between 1945 and 1952 and prompted a resurgence in the industry. Some of the vessels sent south had been seized from Germany as enemy property while other factories and catchers were newly built. British companies produced 39,708 tons of oil in the 1945–46 season, rising to 89,012 tons in 1948–49. The renewed activity by British, Norwegian and other producers postponed any plans for regulations to limit the number of whales taken and make the industry sustainable.

The International Whaling Commission reduced the length of the whaling season in the late 1940s, and also introduced catch limits. The quotas were set too high and, in any case, were ignored by some operators. Attempts were made to expand the market for whale meat in Britain by marketing it for human consumption, but were unsuccessful. After the oil was extracted most of the residue continued to be processed into low-value meat meal to feed livestock.

The value of whale oil peaked in 1950–1952, in anticipation of strong demand during the Korean War, and then began to decline. The British share of the catch fell after 1954 and companies based in the United Kingdom started to think about how to exit the industry. Hector Whaling did so in 1960 and Salvesen in 1963, bringing to an end three and a half centuries of British involvement. Whaling product imports were banned in Britain in 1973. A massive decline in whale numbers had made the industry uneconomic and the International Whaling Commission introduced a moratorium on commercial whaling in 1982. Britain was one of 25 members of the Commission to successfully approve the moratorium, which went into effect in 1986.

== Whaling vessels ==
- Albion (1798)
- Alexander (1801)
- Amelia Wilson (1809)
- Britannia (1783)
- Butterworth (1785)
- Cadmus (1813)
- Canada (1786)
- Catherine (1811)
- Cumberland (1800)
- Diana (1840)
- Eliza (1789)
- Eliza (1802)
- Harpooner (1791)
- Lively (1796)
- Lynx (1794)
- Mary Ann (1772)
- Rockingham (1767)
- SS Runic (1900)
- Seringapatam (1799)
- Sir Andrew Hammond (1800)
- Speedy (1779)
- Tiger (1773)
- Truelove (1764)
- William (1770)

== In literature ==
Novels about British whaling in polar regions include, W.H.G. Kingston, Peter the whaler, his early life and adventures in the Arctic regions (1851); R.M. Ballantyne, The world of ice, or, the whaling cruise of the Dolphin, and the adventures of her crew in the Arctic regions (1859); Frank Bullen, The Bitter South (1909); Hammond Innes, The White South (1949); Mark Adlard, The Greenlander (1978); Jessica Blair, The Red Shawl (1992); Ian McGuire, The North Water (novel) (2016). The Captain of the Pole-Star (1883) and Life on a Greenland Whaler (1897) are short stories by Arthur Conan Doyle which draw on his experiences as doctor on the Arctic whaler Hope in 1880.

Novels about British whaling in other regions include, R.M. Ballantyne, Fighting the Whales (1863); The South Sea Whaler (1875) by W.H.G. Kingston; Friedrich Gerstacker, Die Nacht auf dem Walfisch (1875); The Far Side of the World (1984) by Patrick O'Brian, tells of a British warship is sent into the Pacific to protect British South Sea whaling ships from an American privateer.

== See also ==
- Greenland Dock, London
- Grytviken, a whaling station in the South Atlantic
- Leith Harbour, another southern whaling station
- Sperm whaling
- Whaling in Scotland
- Dundee Whaling Expedition
- Category:British people in whaling, a list of captains, shipowners and others involved in the industry
