= Mary Ann (1772 ship) =

History

France
- Launched: 1772
- Captured: c.1778

Great Britain
- Name: Ariadne
- Owner: 1786: Hattersley & Co.; 1786:Stephens & Co.; 1791:Calvert & Co.
- Acquired: c.1778 by purchase of a prize
- Renamed: Mary Ann (1786)
- Captured: November 1801

General characteristics
- Tons burthen: 298, or 300 (bm)
- Sail plan: Ship rig
- Complement: 40
- Armament: 1797: 18 × 12&9&3-pounder guns; 1797: 2 ×3 + 14 × 9-pounder guns + 2 × 12-pounder carronades; 1800: 18 × 9&12-pounder guns

The ship that became Mary Ann (or Mary Anne) was built in 1772 in France and the British captured her c. 1778. Her name may have been Ariadne until 1786 when she started to engage in whaling. Next, as Mary Ann, she made one voyage transporting convicts to New South Wales from England. In 1794 the French captured her, but by 1797 she was back in her owners' hands. She then made a slave trading voyage. Next, she became a West Indiaman, trading between London or Liverpool to Demerara. It was on one of those voyages in November 1801 that a French privateer captured her.

== Whaling ==
Mary Ann entered Lloyd's Register (LR) in 1786 with J. Calwell, master. Her owner was Stephens, and trade London—Greenland. (Note: The entry in Lloyd's Register indicates that her name had changed to Mary Ann from Ariadne.) Under Captain Stewart she was in the Greenland Fishery.

Alternatively, in 1786 her owners were Hattersley & Co., and her master was Captain Stephen Skiff. That year she engaged in whaling in the South Seas Fishery.

Lloyd's Register for 1787 had her master changing to Stewart, and then Stephen Skiff. It showed her trade changing from London—Greenland to London—South Seas.

In 1787 she sailed to the Brazil Banks. She was under Captain S. Skiff, with owners Stephens & Co, or Hattersley & Co. She returned on 19 July 1789 with 20 tuns sperm oil, 180 tuns whale oil, and 140 cwt bone.

In 1790 Mary Ann was again in the Fishery. Then in 1791 she underwent a "good repair".

== Convict transport ==
In 1791 she transported convicts from England to Australia and was under the command of Captain Mark Munroe. (Note: She appeared in Lloyd's Register for 1791 as the Mary & Ann, and her master appears as "Munrow". Her owners at the time were Calvert & Co.) She departed Portsmouth on 16 February 1791 and arrived on 9 July in Port Jackson, New South Wales. She sailed independently, her voyage taking place between the second and the third fleets. She embarked 150 female convicts, nine of whom died during the voyage.

She sailed from Port Jackson in November and sailed as far as 45° South, but returned, not having seen any whales.

On her return to New South Wales Governor Arthur Phillip chartered her for voyages to Norfolk Island. She then sailed to the coast of Peru and Chile on a whaling voyage, calling at Valparaíso. From there she returned to England via Rio de Janeiro, where she stopped in March 1793, before arriving at London in on 24 May. She returned with 25 tons of sperm oil, eight tons of whale oil, and 1,900 seal skins.

From 1792 on, Lloyd's Register gives Mary Ann's owner as "Capt & Co."

== Subsequent career ==
Lloyd's Register continues to show Munroe as master and her trade as London—Botany Bay until 1797. In 1797 Mary Ann's master changes to Curry, her owner changes to Calvert & Co., and her trade becomes London−Africa.

=== Capture ===
It is likely that actually Currie assumed command much earlier. On 14 October 1794 Lloyd's List reported that the French frigate Druid had captured Mary Ann at 49°30′N 12°40′W on 13 August. Mary Ann had been on her way from Tobago to London. (Note: There was no French frigate named Druid at the time. The name may have been Dryade.)

It is not clear when and how Mary Ann was restored to her owners, but it is clear from the data in Lloyd's Register for 1797 that she was.

=== Enslaving voyage ===
Captain Robert Currie received a letter of marque on 16 October 1797. Currie sailed Mary Ann from London on 5 November 1797, bound for the Gold Coast. In 1797, 104 vessels sailed from British ports bound on voyages to transport enslaved people; 12 of these vessels sailed from London.

Mary Ann embarked captives at Cape Coast Castle. She arrived at Demerara on 27 September 1798, with 407 captives.

=== Merchantman ===
The 1800 volume of the Register of Shipping shows May Ann's owner changing to A.M.McNab, her master to Jones, and her trade becoming London and Liverpool to Demerara.

== Fate ==
Lloyd's Register for 1803 shows Mary Ann's master as F. Paul, with her trade still Liverpool—Demerara.

Lloyd's List for 5 February 1802 reported that on 13 November 1801 the French 14-gun privateer Brilliant captured Mary Ann, Paul, master, at 7°N 51°W and took her into Guadeloupe. Mary Ann had been sailing from Liverpool via Madeira to Demerara.

== See also ==
- Mary Ann
