= Rockingham (1767 ship) =

History
- Name: Almsbury
- Owner: Enderby & Co.
- Builder: America
- Launched: 1767
- Renamed: Rockingham (1768); Swift (1782)
- Fate: No longer listed after 1795

General characteristics
- Tons burthen: 170, 189, or 200 (bm). (bm)
- Sail plan: snow
- Armament: 4 × 4-pounder guns (1782)

Rockingham was launched in America in 1767 as Almsbury. By 1768 Samuel Enderby & Sons were her owners and her name was Rockingham. At least from 1773, Enderbys used her as a whaler, and she made eight whaling voyages for them under that name. On 4 July 1773, she met the Phipps' expedition by Shpitzbergen. In 1782 Enderbys renamed her Swift, and as Swift she then performed ten whaling voyages on the Brazil Banks and off Africa until 1793. She was still listed in Lloyd's Register as whaling until 1795.

== Rockingham ==
Rockingham entered Lloyd's List in 1768 as Almsbury, renamed to Rockingham. Her owner was Enderby & Co., her master was John Reed, and her voyages were Newfoundland-London and New England–London.

In 1774 Rockingham, Reed, master, was sailing from Liverpool to Lisbon. She received extensive damage in the Bay of Biscay and had to put back to Plymouth for repairs.

She made eight whaling voyages for Enderby between 1775 and 1782. For her first whaling voyage Captain Elihu L. Clark sailed from Britain on 11 November 1775 for the Brazil Banks. Rockingham returned the next year with 19½ tuns of sperm oil and 20½ tuns of whale oil.

Rockingham left on 10 October 1776 for the Brazil Banks under the command of Captain Tristram Barnard (or Barnet). She returned from her second whaling journey on 8 July 1777 with 26 tuns of sperm oil and 33 tuns of whale oil. She underwent repairs in 1777.

Barnard sailed her again in 1777 on her third whaling voyage. She returned with 24½ tuns of sperm oil and 46 tuns of whale oil. She again underwent repairs in 1778.

Rockingham sailed on her fourth whaling voyage under the command of W. Gardner and later under Barnabas Ray to the southward of Greenland Seas and the Davis Strait. She returned on 8 August 1779 with 21½ tuns of whale oil.

In 1779 Barnabas Ray sailed Rockingham for the Brazil Banks and Africa on her fifth whaling voyage. She returned with 33¼ tuns of sperm oil.

Captain William Goldsmith sailed Rockingham on her sixth whaling voyage on 3 April 1780 with the destination of the Brazil Banks and Africa. She returned on 25 October 1781.

In 1781-82 Rockingham made two trips, one with William Folger as master, and the other with Peearce (or Pease) as master.

== Swift ==
In 1782 Rockingham underwent a good repair and Enderbys renamed her Swift. She then went on to perform another nine whaling voyages.

In 1782 Captain William Goldsmith sailed Swift on her first whaling voyage under that name. She returned on 21 March 1783 with 74 tuns of sperm oil. She underwent a good repair on her return.

In 1783 Goldsmith sailed Swift to the Brazil Banks on her second whaling voyage. She returned on 28 April 1784 with 80 tuns of sperm oil from 27 fish (whales).

Captain P. Pease left for the Brazil Banks on 21 June 1784. Swift returned from her third whaling voyage with 76 tuns of sperm oil.

Swift's fourth whaling voyage, in August 1785, again took her to the Brazil Banks and Africa, again under the command of Captain Pease. She returned on 8 September 1786 with 28 tuns of sperm oil and eight tuns of whale oil.

Captain Simon Paul sailed Swift on her fifth whaling voyage, leaving Britain on 16 December 1786 for the Brazil Banks. Swift and Paul were reported to have been "all well" at Cape Verde on 8 January 1787. He returned on 21 September 1787 with 95 tuns of whale oil and 75 cwt of whale bone (baleen).

George Hales was Swift's master on her sixth whaling voyage. She left in 1787 and returned on 18 August 1788 with 86 tuns of whale oil, 69 cwt of whale bone, and 3009 seal skins.

Hales was again master on Swift's seventh whaling voyage. She left in 1788 and was "all well" at "St Hellen's Bay" on 9 March 1789. On 10 September she was at 14°54′N 23°26′W. She returned to Britain on 20 September 1789 with nine tuns of sperm oil, 98 tuns of whale oil, and 70 cwt of whale bone.

Captain Blatchford was master on Swift's eighth whaling voyage. She left in 1791 and returned on 8 June 1792.

Blachford (or Blackford) sailed for the Brazil Banks in 1792. Swift returned from her ninth whaling voyage on 14 July 1793 with 125 tuns of whale oil and 90 cwt of whale bone.

For her tenth whaling voyage Swift for Africa on 1793. She returned with 32 tuns of sperm oil, 100 tuns of whale oil, and 75 cwt of whale bone.

== Fate ==
Swift was last listed in Lloyd's Register in 1797 with Blanchard, master, S. Enderby, owner, and trade London–South Seas. The information had not changed since 1794, suggesting that it was stale.
