= Samuel Enderby & Sons =

British sealing and whaling company

- Industry: Whaling; Sealing
- Founded: 1776; 250 years ago
- Founder: Samuel Enderby
- Defunct: 1854
- Fate: Liquidation
- Headquarters: London, England

Samuel Enderby & Sons was a whaling and sealing company based in London, England, founded circa 1775 by Samuel Enderby (1717–1797). The company was significant in the history of whaling in the United Kingdom, not least for encouraging their captains to combine exploration with their business activities, and sponsored several of the earliest expeditions to the subantarctic, Southern Ocean and Antarctica itself.

== History of the company: 1773–1800 ==
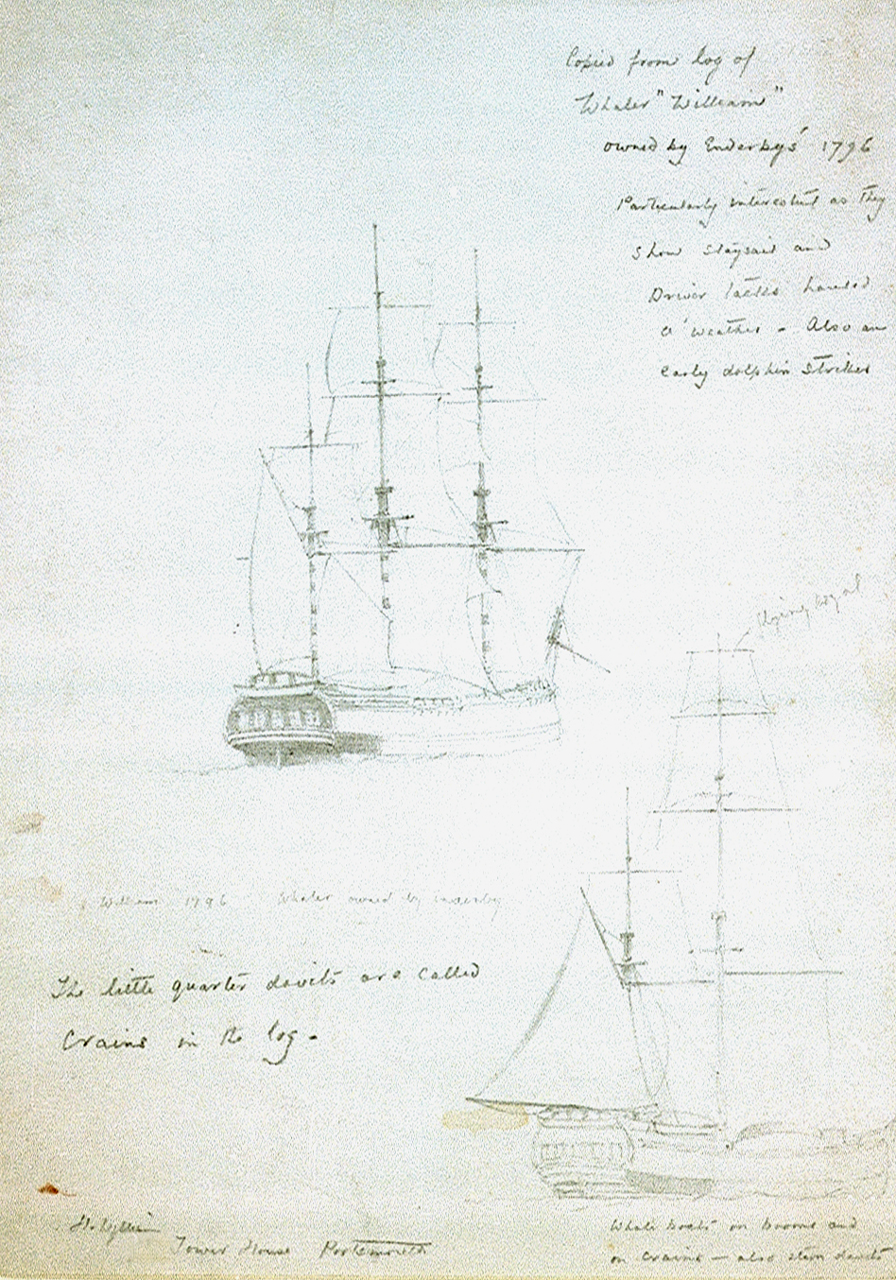
Whaler William 1796 owned by Enderby's, with notes on rigging etc.

Enderby had acquired at least one ship, Almsbury, c. 1768, renamed Rockingham, that he used as a trader. In 1773 Enderby began the Southern Fishery, a whaling firm with ships registered in London and Boston. All of the captains and harpooners were American Loyalists. The vessels transported finished goods to the American colonies, and brought whale oil from New England to England. Some of Enderby's ships were reportedly chartered for the tea cargoes that were ultimately dumped into Boston Harbor during the Boston Tea Party incident.

An embargo was placed on whale oil exports from New England in 1775, as a result of the American Revolutionary War. Enderby therefore elected to pursue the whaling trade in the South Atlantic. Rockingham embarked on her first whaling voyage on 11 November 1775 when Captain Elihu L. Clark sailed her from Britain for the Brazil Banks.

Samuel Enderby founded the Samuel Enderby & Sons company the following year. He and his business associates Alexander Champion and John St Barbe assembled a fleet of twelve whaling vessels on the Greenwich Peninsula, on the River Thames just downstream from the City of London.

By 1785, Samuel Enderby & Sons controlled seventeen ships engaged in this business. All were commanded by American Loyalists. That year, whales in the South Atlantic had become nearly extinct due to pressure from the whaling industry. The Enderby family therefore shifted its focus to the seas around New Zealand, with the Bay of Islands as its main base of operations.

In early 1786, the Enderby family lobbied the government for the right to go into the South Pacific (an area in which the East India Company had historically enjoyed a monopoly). The lobbying efforts were eventually successful, and on 1 September 1788, the 270 ton whaling vessel Amelia, owned by Samuel Enderby & Sons and commanded by Captain James Shields, departed London. The ship went west around Cape Horn into the Pacific Ocean to become the first ship of any nation to conduct whaling operations in the Southern Ocean. A crewman, Archelus Hammond of Nantucket, killed the first sperm whale there off the coast of Chile on 3 March 1789. Amelia returned to London on 12 March 1790 with a cargo of 139 tons of sperm oil. The Amelia voyage marked the beginning of a new era for the company—one in which many great voyages of oceanographic and geographic exploration were accomplished, but which would ultimately prove to be a drain on company profits.

By 1791, the company owned or leased 68 whaling ships operating in the subantarctic region and the Southern Ocean. Whaling vessels owned by Samuel Enderby & Sons were part of the Third Fleet taking convicts to New South Wales in 1791. These vessels included Britannia, William and Ann, Mary Ann, Matilda, and Active. Captain Eber Bunker, the enterprising American captain of William and Ann, not wanting to return to England with an empty vessel, became the first to hunt whales in New Zealand waters in December 1791. From this time forward, Enderby's ships Speedy, Britannia, and Ocean made frequent whaling voyages from Port Jackson.

Over the next decade the area became more attractive as the East India Company's monopoly on fishing in South Pacific waters was progressively lifted, and Governor Phillip Parker King of New South Wales (Phillip Parker King's father Philip Gidley King was governor of NSW) worked to attract the whaling industry.

From January 1793 to November 1794, Enderby sent Rattler to survey whaling grounds in the southeastern Pacific, under the command of Lieutenant James Colnett, Royal Navy. Colnett surveyed the Galapagos Islands on this expedition.

Samuel Enderby died in 1797, leaving the company to his three sons, Charles, Samuel, and George.

== History of the company: 1800–1854 ==
By 1801, Governor Phillip King of New South Wales reported six ships engaging in the whaling industry off the northeast coast of New Zealand, and in 1802 he declared that whaling was established in that area.

On 18 August 1806, Captain Abraham Bristow, commander of Ocean, a whaling ship owned by Samuel Enderby & Sons, discovered the Auckland Islands archipelago in the Southern Ocean, south of New Zealand. Finding them uninhabited, he named them "Lord Auckland's" after his father's friend William Eden, 1st Baron Auckland. Bristow returned on Sarah in 1807 in order to claim the archipelago for England.

On 3 August 1819, the whaling vessel Syren, owned by Samuel Enderby & Sons and commanded by Captain Frederick Coffin of Nantucket, Massachusetts, visited the whaling grounds off Japan. The ship returned to London on 21 April 1822 with a cargo of 346 tons of sperm oil.

In 1830, after the death of their father, Samuel Enderby Junior (1756–1829), Samuel Enderby's grandsons, Charles and George Enderby, bought a site on the Thames River which became known as Enderby's Wharf. This site became the new headquarters of the Messrs Enderby company. There they built a ropewalk and a factory, known as Enderby's Hemp Rope Works, for the production of sail canvas and rope from hemp and flax.

From 1830 to 1833, Samuel Enderby & Sons sponsored the Southern Ocean Expedition as part of an effort to locate new sealing grounds in the Southern Ocean. This expedition, involved two company-owned vessels: the whaling brig Tula, and the cutter Lively. The expedition, led by Captain John Biscoe of the Tula, was the third ever to circumnavigate the Antarctic continent. (Captain James Cook being the first, and Fabian von Bellingshausen being the second.) The expedition discovered and charted a large coastal land mass in East Antarctica which Biscoe named Enderby Land. Biscoe also charted many other terrain features, including Cape Ann, Mount Biscoe, Adelaide Island, the Biscoe Islands, and Graham Land. Despite the loss of several men to scurvy and the wreck of the Lively at the Falkland Islands in July 1832, the expedition successfully returned to London in early 1833.

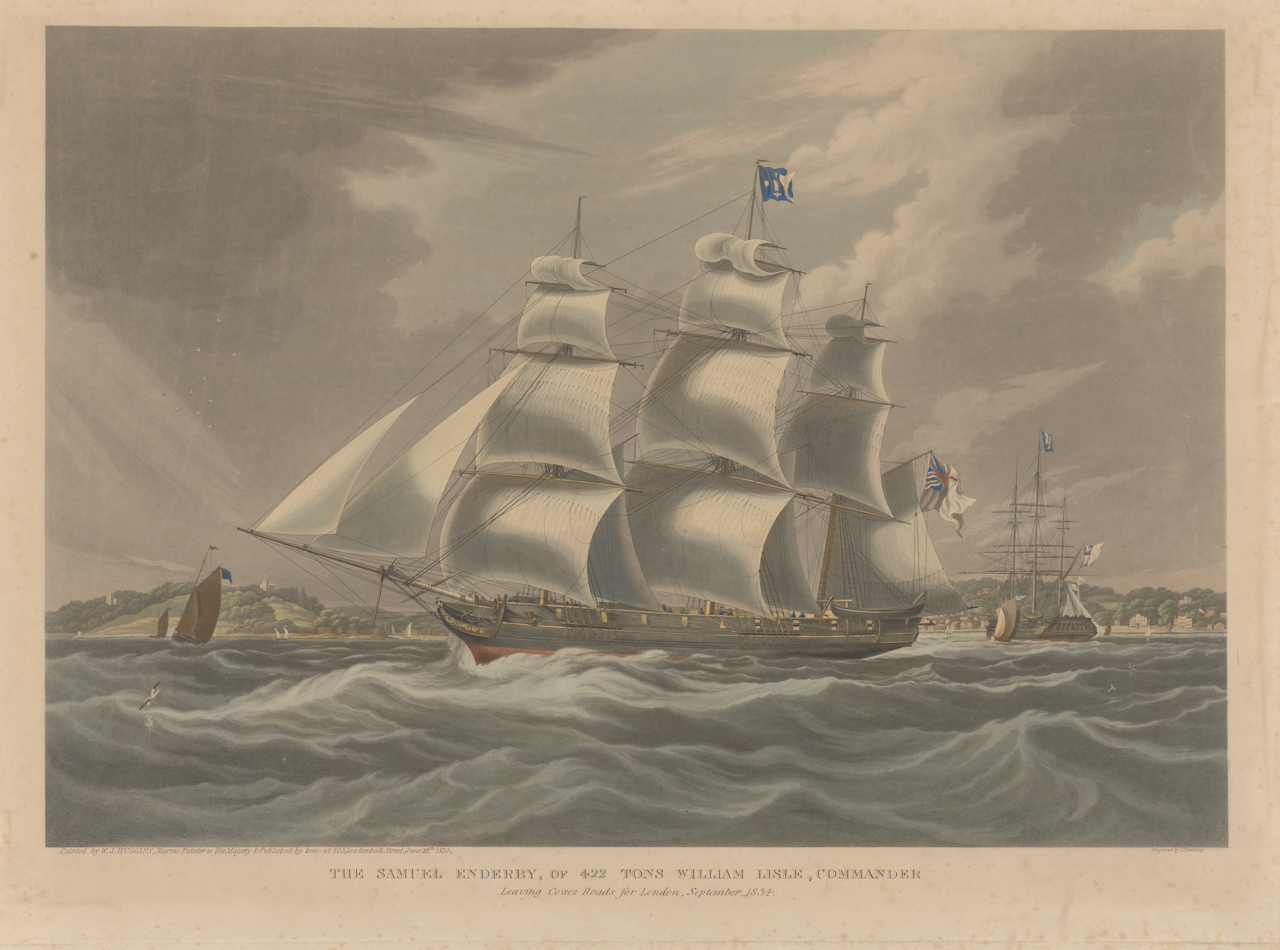
The Samuel Enderby - leaving Cowes Roads for London, September 1834

From 1838 to 1839, Captain John Balleny led another expedition to the Southern Ocean. Commanding the Eliza Scott, another whaling schooner, this expedition led to the discovery of the Balleny Islands.

In 1846, Samuel Enderby's grandson Charles Enderby founded the Southern Whale Fishery Company in England. In December 1849, he established the Enderby Settlement in Erebus Cove, Port Ross, at the north-eastern end of Auckland Island, close to Enderby Island. This was the beginning of the community named Hardwicke. The Hardwicke settlement was based on agriculture, resupply and minor repair of ships, and whaling. Ultimately unsuccessful, the colony was abandoned in August 1852.

Charles Enderby returned to London in 1853. The ill-fated Enderby Settlement finally bankrupted the Enderby family business, which was liquidated in 1854. Charles Enderby died in poverty in London on 31 August 1876.

== Terrain features named after the Enderby family ==
Terrain features named after the Enderby family include:

- Enderby Land, a large coastal land mass located in East Antarctica extending from Shinnan Glacier at 44°0′S 38°0′E to William Scoresby Bay at 59°0′S 34°0′E.
- Enderby Island, part of the uninhabited Auckland Islands archipelago in New Zealand.
- Enderby Plain, an undersea plain located at 60°0′S 40°0′E.

== Fictional References ==
- In Chapter 100 of the novel Moby-Dick, Pequod of Nantucket meets a whaling ship of London named Samuel Enderby, which has also encountered the White Whale. Samuel Enderby was a real ship and was in fact among the three Enderby company ships (the other two were Fancy and Brisk) from England that arrived at Port Ross in 1849 carrying the 150 colonists for the new Enderby Settlement. Chapter 101 of Moby Dick discusses Samuel Enderby & Sons whaling company in further detail.
- In the novel The Far Side of the World (chapter 3) by Patrick O'Brian a character describes the voyages of Shields in Amelia and Colnett in Rattler.

== See also ==
- List of Antarctic expeditions
- History of whaling
- Whaling in the United Kingdom
