= Speedy (1779 ship) =

History

Great Britain
- Name: Speedy
- Owner: 1779-1805:Samuel Enderby & Sons; 1805 to c.1814: Swansby, Swansea, or Swanzy
- Launched: 1779, Thames
- Fate: Captured 1807; no longer listed after 1814

General characteristics
- Tons burthen: 313 or 320 (bm)
- Armament: 1799: 2 × 3-pounder guns; 1809: 14 × 6-pounder carronades

Speedy was a whaler launched on the Thames in 1779. She also made voyages to New South Wales, transporting female convicts in 1799. She made two voyages transporting enslaved people in 1805 and 1806, and was captured in January 1807, on her way into London after having delivered her captives to Antigua in 1806.

== Whaler and convict transport ==
Speedy was under the command of Captain John Locke in 1791, when she sailed to the British southern whale fishery. She was reported at the Cape Verde islands in January 1792, Rio de Janeiro in February, and off the coast of Peru in November. She was back in Britain in August 1793.

She was mentioned in the Protection Lists in 1793, 1794, and 1796. (Note: The Protection List listed vessels whose crews were exempt from naval service, i.e., impressment.)

Captain Thomas Melville sailed in late 1793, to transport stores to Port Jackson and then engage in whaling. However, he was reported to have had to return to Rio de Janeiro in February 1794, to undertake repairs.

Melville had been captain on Britannia, also a whaler belonging to Samuel Enderby & Sons, in 1791, when she had been one of 11 ships of the Third Fleet, bound for the Sydney penal settlement. He had seen sperm whales off Van Diemen's Land and Port Jackson, and after delivering the convicts, Britannia had gone whaling; her crew killed the first four whales taken off the coast of Australia. Melville then wrote to his employers about the prospects for whaling in the region.

On this second voyage, Melville sailed Speedy to the coast of Chile, where she was reported "well" in November. She stopped at Rio in January 1796, and arrived back in Britain in October.

Between 1797 and 1799, Speedy was under the command of Captain Abraham Bristow, serving in the South Seas Whale Fisheries. At this point she was armed, though with only two 3-pounder guns. She was back in Britain by July 1799.

Captain George Quested replaced Bristow later in 1799. Speedy is on the Protection List for 1799. She then sailed from England on 24 November 1799, and arrived at Port Jackson on 15 April 1800. She had embarked 53 female convicts, three of whom died on the voyage.

Speedy left Port Jackson in July 1800, to whale off New Holland. She returned to Sydney on 1 January 1801, with 300 barrels of oil and a crew of 24. While at Port Jackson, Captain Quested was one of three South Sea whaling masters Governor King interviewed about the best route to Australia and the relative merits of the whale fishery offshore compared with that off the west coast of South America. The vessel departed Sydney in 4 February. Returned 11 July 1801, with 72 tuns of oil. Speedy departed Sydney on 8 August, and arrived back in London in November 1802, with 150 tons of sperm oil.

== Subsequent career ==
From 1801 to 1807, Lloyd's Register continued to carry her with "Questade" as master, S. Enderby as owner, and her trade as a transport operating out of London. She also was no longer armed. Between 1801 and 1804, however, she was listed as Speed, only reverting to the name Speedy in 1805.

The Register of Shipping for 1805 showed Speedy with H. Aitkins, master, Swansby, owner, and trade London-Africa.

Then in 1805 and 1806 Speedy made two voyages as a slave ship, gathering captives on the Gold Coast, and carrying them to the West Indies. Henry Atkins sailed on 23 October 1804. Speedy started gathering captives at Cape Coast Castle and Accra on 11 February 1805. Speedy arrived at Demerara on 11 June, with 284 captives. The Essequebo and Demerary Gazette published on 15 June the following advertisement: "William Mackenzie & Co. will expose for Sale, on Wednesday the 19th Instant; - 250 Prime Gold Coast Negroes, the Cargo of the Ship Speedy, Capt. Henry Atkins from Cape Coast.... N.B. The Speedy will take Freight for London by the July Convoy."

At some point Captain C.C. Sall replaced Atkins. Speedy returned to London on 13 December.

Henry Atkins sailed for Cape Coast Castle on 6 March 1806, and arrived on 14 June. She left Africa on 3 March, and arrived at St John, Antigua, on 1 October. At some point John Laten replaced Atkins as captain.

== Capture ==
The French captured Speedy after she had disembarked her captives. Lloyd's List for 27 January 1807, stated that the reports that Speedy, Laten, master, had arrived in the Thames were premature. She had parted from the fleet on 27 December, and had not since been heard from. Then on 17 February, Lloyd's List reported that the privateer Glaneur, of Saint-Malo had captured Speedy, from Antigua to London, and taken her into Île de Ré on 19 January. (Note: Glâneur was a 60-ton (of load), 14-gun privateer built in Saint-Malo in 1806 and commissioned in November 1806. She did a cruise under Louis-Joseph Quoniam with 65 men between November 1806 and March 1807. Circa September 1807, she departed under Fabre for the cruise during which HMS Scorpion captured her.)

In 1806, 33 British slave ships were lost; in 1807, 12 were lost. The source for this information did not report any vessels being lost on the homeward leg of their triangular voyage. However, that may be due to nothing more than not identifying when a vessel sailing from the West Indies was a slave ship returning home. During the period 1793 to 1807, war, rather than maritime hazards or resistance by the captives, was the greatest cause of vessel losses among British slave vessels.

The registers both carried relatively unchanging information for some years thereafter. Speedy was no longer listed in the Register of Shipping after 1813 and in Lloyd's Register after 1814. As the registers often carried stale information, a failure to update is the most likely explanation.
