= Wreck of the Rockingham, 1775 =

In 1775 a vessel variously named Rockingham, Castle Rockingham, or Marquis of Rockingham wrecked on the Irish coast with loss of life.

== Vessel ==
Some records refer to the vessel as the "Rockingham transport".

Regimental histories of the 32nd Regiment of Foot or its successor regiment refer to the vessel as Castle Rockingham.

Yet other records refer to the vessel as Marquis of Rockingham. There were two vessels by that name that served the British East India Company, but neither vessel appears to be the one that was wrecked.

== Wreck ==
In late 1775, Rockingham was hired to transport three companies of the 32nd Regiment of Foot, along with a number of their families, to Ireland en route to British North America as part of a force under General Cornwallis. On 21 November it was reported that all baggage was loaded, and she was ordered to Gravesend; she sailed in a convoy of six transports on 10 December, but was driven back by heavy wind.

On the night of 23 December 1775, making for the Cove of Cork in a heavy gale, she mistook Robert's Cove for the entrance to the harbour, and was driven onto a lee shore at Reannie's Bay, a few miles distant.

The master and crew of the ship were drowned, as were about ninety of the passengers. A number of officers and soldiers managed to escape in a flat-bottomed boat; the numbers are unclear, but were variously reported as five officers and twenty men, four officers and thirty men, or three officers, thirty men, and two of the ship's crew. The regimental pay chest and records were also lost in the wreck.
