= Samuel Enderby =

British whaler and merchant (1719–1797)

Samuel Enderby (17 January 1719 – 19 September 1797) was an English whale oil merchant, significant in the history of whaling in the United Kingdom. In the 18th century, he founded Samuel Enderby & Sons, a prominent shipping, whaling, and sealing company.

== Family ==
The Enderby family had been tanners (leather workers) at Bermondsey, and supported Oliver Cromwell. Daniel Enderby I raised money for the army in the Long Parliament, as recorded in Hansard. The family was granted forfeited estates at Lismore, County Waterford, Ireland, which were sold in 1660. After that time, the family was active in the 'oil and Russia trade' and traded with the New England colonies.

Samuel was apprenticed to a cooper in the 1730s.

On 2 June 1752, Samuel Enderby II married Mary Buxton, a daughter of his business partner, at St Paul's Wharf in London. Enderby died in 1797, leaving the company to his three sons Charles, Samuel III, and George.

Samuel Enderby III (1755-1829) owned Britannia, the ship that made the first successful whale catch off Australia (10 November 1791). He was the grandfather of Major-General Charles George Gordon.

== Fictional references ==
- In Chapter 100 of the novel Moby-Dick, the Pequod of Nantucket meets a whaling ship of London named the Samuel Enderby, which has also encountered the White Whale. The Samuel Enderby was a real ship, which was in fact among the three Enderby company ships (the other two were the Fancy and the Brisk) from England that arrived at Port Ross in 1849 carrying the 150 colonists for the new Enderby Settlement. Chapter 101 of Moby Dick discusses Samuel Enderby & Sons whaling company in further detail.
