= HMS Dart =

Ten ships of the Royal Navy have borne the name HMS Dart, after the River Dart in Devon:

- HMS Dart (1796) was a 28-gun sloop-of-war launched in 1796 and broken up in 1809.
- HMS Dart (1803) was an 8-gun lugger, previously the British privateer Dart, built in 1796, captured by the French in 1798, recaptured from the French by HMS Apollo in 1803, and sold in 1808.
- HMS Dart (1810) was a 10-gun cutter, the mercantile Belerina or Ballerina, which had been building at Mevagissey in 1809; the Royal Navy purchased her in 1810 and she was lost at sea in between October and December 1813.
- HMS Dart (1847) was a 3-gun Pandora-class brig launched in 1847, converted to a coastguard vessel and renamed WV.26 in 1863 and broken up in 1875.
- HMS Dart (1860) was a wooden Philomel-class gunvessel launched in 1860. She was renamed HMS Kangaroo in 1882 and broken up in 1884.
- HMS Dart (1882) was the ex-colonial yacht Cruiser, transferred in 1882, lent to the New South Wales government in 1904 and sold in 1912.
- HMS PC.73 (1918), a PC-class sloop launched in 1918, was renamed HMS Dart in 1925. She was sold for breaking in 1938.
- HMS Dart (minesweeper), an auxiliary minesweeper that struck a mine and sank in the Suez Canal on 8 March 1941
- HMS Dart was the original name of the Flower-class corvette HMS Godetia, launched in 1941, transferred to the Belgian forces in exile in 1942 and scrapped in 1947.
- HMS Dart (K21) was a River-class frigate launched in 1942 and sold for breaking in 1956.

== Also ==
- HM hired armed cutter Dart (1803–1805)
