= Camden, Calvert and King =

London slave-trading company

Camden, Calvert and King was an eighteenth-century partnership that traded in London from 1760 to 1824, transporting slaves and later convicts. The partners' profits from slave trading created capital to fund other ventures including the East Indies trade, supplying the British army and navy with food, insurance underwriting and the status to obtain positions in important London organisations including the Corporation of London, Bank of England, East India Company, African Company of Merchants and Trinity House.

== Activities ==
The partners owned whalers, merchant vessels trading to the East and West Indies, slave ships, and vessels transporting convicts to Australia.

The partners became involved in the transportation of English convicts first to America and later to Australia. The firm had the contracts for the Second and Third Fleets transporting convicts to Australia in 1790 and 1791 respectively.

They were the largest company in London involved in the triangular trade in enslaved people. Between 1776 and 1807, either together or separately, the firms partners launched 93 slave voyages and at its peak Camden, Calvert and King was responsible for a fifth of all slaving voyages sailing from London. After the British Parliament passed an Act for the abolition of the slave trade in 1807, the company continued to put its know-how in transporting people to work transporting convicts to Australia.

The principal partners were William Camden (1730s–1796), Anthony Calvert (1735–1809) and Thomas King (1735?–1824).

The business of the firm also extended to insurance and finance. Thomas King became a subscriber to the Lloyd's insurance market in 1798. He had been underwriting slaves ships in the market from at least 1794. Calvert became a subscriber to Lloyd's in 1800.

== Addresses ==
- 12 Red Lion Street, Wapping
- Limehouse Shipyard
- The Crescent and 14 America Square, Minories
- 24 Burr Street, Wapping
- Alie (Ayliffe) Street, Aldgate

== Vessels ==
- Active (1764 ship)
- Admiral Barrington (1781 ship)
- HMS Albemarle (1779)
- Argus (1807 ship)
- Duke of Bronte (1800 ship)
- Lion (1796 ship)
- Matilda (1790 ship)
- Mary Ann (1772)
- Neptune (1780 ship)
- Prince (1787 ship)
- Queen (1773 ship)
- Salamander
- Surprize (1780 ship)
