= Experiment (1789 ship) =

History

Great Britain
- Name: Experiment
- Owner: Calvert & Co. (Note: The owners were the partners Anthony Calvert, Thomas King, and William Camden. Anthony Calvert was the managing partner from 1783 until the partnership was dissolved in 1800.)
- Builder: River Thames
- Launched: 1789
- Captured: 1795

General characteristics
- Type: Brig
- Tons burthen: 143, or 145 (bm)
- Propulsion: Sail
- Armament: 8 × 4-pounder guns

Experiment was launched on the River Thames in 1789. She made seven voyages for Calvert & Co. as a slave ship in the triangular trade in enslaved people, carrying captives from the Gold Coast to Jamaica. A French squadron captured her in 1795.

== Career ==
Experiment appears in Lloyd's Register for 1789 with R. Owen, master, Calvert & Co., owners, and trade London—Africa. A database of slave trading voyages shows Experiment making seven voyages.

1st enslaving voyage (1789–1790): Richard Owen was her master for the first, with Diederick Woolbert replacing him at some point in the venture. Experiment sailed from London on 13 July 1789 for the Gold Coast. She started gathering captives at Cape Coast Castle on 16 September. She then sailed from Africa on 30 April 1790, and arrived at Jamaica in June 1790. She had embarked 242 captives and disembarked 240, for an unusually low loss rate of 0.8%.

After the passage of Dolben's Act in 1788, masters received a bonus of £100 for a mortality rate of under 2%; the ship's surgeon received £50. For a mortality rate between two and three per cent, the bonus was halved. There was no bonus if mortality exceeded 3%.

In June 1790, the Daily Advertiser (at Kingston) carried an advertisement for 200 prime Gold Coast slaves, imported from Anomabu in the brig Experiment, to be sold on behalf of Calvert & Co. by their agents, Shaw and Inglis.

2nd enslaving voyage (1790–1791): Captain Diederick Woolbert sailed from Jamaica in August, straight back to Africa. Experiment starting to gather captives on 9 November, first at Cape Coast Castle and then at Anomabu. She left on 8 December, and arrived back at Kingston 5 February 1791. She had embarked 238 captives and she landed 232, for a still low loss rate of 2.5%. She arrived back in England on 20 May 1791.

3rd enslaving voyage (1791–1792): Captain Woolbert sailed from London 28 June 1791. Experiment started gathering her captives, again at Cape Coast Castle and then Anomabu, from 14 September. She left Africa on 10 October and arrived at Kingston, Jamaica, on 13 February 1792. She had embarked 239 captives and she landed 238, for a loss rate of 0.4%.

4th enslaving voyage (1792): Captain John Marman sailed straight back to Africa from Jamaica in April. He returned to Jamaica on 2 August 1792. Experiment had embarked 206 convicts and she landed 191, for a loss rate of 7.3%, which is in the more normal range.

5th enslaving voyage (1792–1793): Captain Marman sailed from Jamaica on 28 August 1792, and started gathering captives at Cape Coast Castle and then Anomabu. Experiment left Africa on 23 May 1793 and arrived at Kingston on 16 July. She had embarked 238 captives and she disembarked 231, for a loss rate of 2.9%. Before arriving at Kingston she reportedly had touched at Grenada. Experiment, Manning, master, arrived at Dover in early November from Jamaica.

6th enslaving voyage (1794–1795): Captain William Mechan sailed from England on 14 January 1794. Experiment arrived at the Gold Coast on 26 June and started gathering captives at Cape Coast Castle and Anomabu. She arrived at Kingston 2 February 1795. She had embarked 270 captives and she landed 251, for a loss rate of 7%.

7th enslaveing voyage (1795–loss): Captain Mechan sailed from Kingston on 19 April. Experiment gathered slaves at Cape Coast Castle. Before she could deliver them she was captured.

== Loss ==
Lloyd's List reported on 8 September 1795 that a French squadron coming from Africa had captured Experiment, Mitchan, master, as she was sailing from Jamaica to Africa, and took her into Rochefort. The squadron had captured four vessels, taking two in Rochfort (one of them Experiment), and sinking two.

The Trans-Atlantic Slave Trade database reports that Experiment was recaptured or released subsequently, but as of November 2022, it has not been verified.

In 1795, 50 British slave ships were lost, the highest number for the entire 1793–1807 period. Forty were lost on their way to Africa. During the period 1793 to 1807, war, rather than maritime hazards or resistance by the captives, was the greatest cause of vessel losses among British slave ships.
