= Diligence (ship) =

Several vessels have been named Diligence:

- Diligence (1799 ship) was a Spanish prize that British owners acquired in 1799. She initially traded as a West Indiaman. Then in 1801–1802 she made one complete voyage as a slave ship in the triangular trade in enslaved people. On her second voyage as a slave ship, the French captured her in 1804 before she had embarked any slaves.
- Diligence (1800 ship) or Diligent was launched in Spain in 1795 and came into British ownership as a French prize acquired in 1800. She became a slave ship in the triangular trade in enslaved people. She made three complete voyages as a slave ship. She was wrecked in 1804 on her fourth journey before she had embarked any slaves. During her third voyage she captured three French vessels.

== See also ==
- HMS Diligence – one of several vessels of the Royal Navy
