= Diligence (1799 ship) =

British merchant and slave ship (1799–1804)

History

Great Britain
- Name: Diligence
- Owner: Calvert & Co. (Note: The owners were the partners Anthony Calvert, Thomas King, and William Camden. Anthony Calvert was the managing partner of Camden, Calvert, and King from 1783 until the partnership was dissolved in 1800. Calvert then established a new partnership, this time with his employee and nephew Thomas Morton. This new partnership owned Diligence.)
- Launched: Spain
- Acquired: 1799, by purchase of a prize
- Captured: 1804

General characteristics
- Tons burthen: 98, or 100 (bm)
- Armament: 2 × 3-pounder guns

Diligence was a Spanish prize that British owners acquired in 1799. She initially traded as a West Indiaman. Then in 1801–1802 she made one complete voyage as a slave ship in the triangular trade in enslaved people. On her second voyage transporting enslaved people, the French captured her in 1804 before she had embarked any captives.

== Career ==
Diligence first appeared in the Register of Shipping in 1800.

Year	Master	Owner	Trade	Source & notes
1800	J.M'Iver	Calvert & Co.	London–Demerara	RS; new wales, deck, & sides, and thorough repair 1799
1802	Higgins	Calvert & Co.	London–Demerara	RS; new wales, deck, & sides, and thorough repair 1799

Captain E. Higgins sailed from London on 2 October 1801. Diligence arrived at St Vincent in June 1802.

Year	Master	Owner	Trade	Source & notes
1804	T.Bolland	Calvert & Co.	London–Africa	RS; new wales, deck, & sides, and thorough repair 1799 & 1803

Captain Thomas Boland sailed from London on 4 October 1803. In 1803, 99 vessels sailed from English ports, bound for the trade in enslaved people; 15 of these vessels sailed from London.

In April 1804, Lloyd's List reported that the French had captured Diligence, Bowland, master, and had taken her into Gorée. She had been on her way from London to Africa. (Note: Gorée was in French hands between 18 January 1804 and 17 March.)

In 1804, 30 British slave vessels were lost; six were captured on their way to Africa. During the period 1793 to 18047, war, rather than maritime hazards or slave resistance was the greatest cause of vessel losses among British slave vessels.
