= William King (merchant) =

- Born: c.1785 Middlesex
- Died: 26 April 1861; London
- Occupation: West Indies merchant
- Board member of: Thomas & William King
- Parent: Thomas King

William King (c.1785 - 26 April 1861) was an English merchant with interests in estates in British Guiana, Trinidad, and Dominica. He was the son of the slave trader Thomas King.

== Early life and family ==
William King was born around 1785 in Middlesex to the slave-trader Thomas King of Camden, Calvert & King and his wife Sarah. His wife was Elizabeth A. King, born around 1825.

== Career ==
King was a partner in Thomas & William King, merchants of London. He was awarded compensation for the loss of slaves on the Friendship, Sarah, Good Success and Good Interest estates in British Guiana and the Union estate in Trinidad. He also received compensation as a bond creditor in respect of the Geneva estate in Dominica.

He owned the Friendship estate in Demerara, British Guiana, that included over 300 slaves in the early nineteenth century, and the Sarah estate in Demerara with over 170.

He was a director of the London Dock Company.

== Death ==
King died on 26 April 1861. His address at the time of his death was 16 Sussex Square, London, and he was buried at All Souls, Kensal Green, on 3 May 1861. He left an estate that did not exceed £140,000. His wife, Elizabeth, died in 1868 at 134 Westbourne Terrace, London, but left only £10,000.
