= Active (1764 ship) =

History

Great Britain
- Owner: Calvert & Co.
- Builder: Shoreham, Sussex
- Launched: 1764
- Captured: May 1793 by a French privateer

General characteristics
- Tons burthen: 350 (bm)
- Sail plan: Ship rig

Active was a ship built in 1764. Active was almost rebuilt in 1785. The next year her trade was given as London-Jamaica. She transported convicts to Australia in 1791. She returned home via Bombay, carrying a cargo for the British East India Company (EIC). A French privateer captured her in May 1793 as she was returning to Britain.

== Convict transport ==
She served the EIC from 1791 until 1793. Under the command of John Mitchinson, master, she departed Plymouth on 27 March 1791 as part of the Third Fleet, and arrived on 26 September 1791 in Port Jackson in the Colony of New South Wales. She embarked 175 male convicts, 21 of whom died during the voyage. The prisoners disembarked at Port Jackson between 27 September and 1 October.

Governor Phillip discovered that Active and some of the other vessels of the Third Fleet (Admiral Barrington, Albemarle, and Queen) had on board considerable cargoes of copper, lead, iron, cordage, and other commodities destined for a Portuguese settlement in India. Sydney at the time was short of food and other necessities and Phillip pointed out in despatches to Lord Grenville and the Commissioners of the Navy that in future vessels under charter to the government as convict transports and storeships should have their entire cargo space allocated for provisions and other necessities for the colony rather than allowing them to engage in private trade. He also asked that it should be made clear to the contractors in their charter-party agreements that they were required to deliver part of their cargoes to Norfolk Island as well as Port Jackson. In the meantime Phillip was obliged to charter one of the transports to sail to Calcutta for flour and other necessities, and to hire another to go to Norfolk Island.

Active left Port Jackson on 3 December 1791, in company with Albemarle.

== Fate ==
Active left Bombay on 23 December 1792, again in company with Albemarle. French privateers captured Active in May 1793. One source states that she was coming from Canton and that her captor took her to Morlaix, France. A contemporary report in Lloyd's List reports Active as having come from Bombay, and her captor taking her into Brest. The same issue has a separate report of a privateer having taken Albemarle and having sent her into France. A later report has Albemarle going into Morlaix.
