= Nathaniel Carver =

- Born: 24 September 1740; Plymouth, Massachusetts Bay, British America
- Died: 1 May 1815 (aged 74); Plymouth, Massachusetts, U.S.
- Resting place: Old Burial Hill, Plymouth, Massachusetts, US
- Occupation: Merchant sailor

Captain Nathaniel Carver (24 September 1740 – 1 May 1815) was a prosperous merchant of British America. Near the end of the American Revolutionary War, he was captured by a British naval frigate, HMS Albemarle, commanded by Horatio Nelson, whom he later assisted in escaping a superior French force.

== Biography ==
Carver was born on 24 September 1740 in Plymouth in the then-British Province of Massachusetts Bay. He played an active part in town affairs and served on many juries and committees.

=== Encounter with Horatio Nelson ===
Nelson was patrolling the bay now known as Massachusetts Bay, when on 14 July 1782, he stumbled upon and captured the Plymouth schooner Harmony. Lacking knowledge of the dangerous shoals in the area, Nelson 'invited' the schooner's master, Carver, to act as pilot. Carver agreed to help the British, even though he was a prominent citizen of Plymouth and had previously signed the Plymouth Petition, drawn up in 1773 in opposition to British tyranny.

Carver had been aboard the Albemarle for a month when she encountered a squadron of four French ships of the line and a frigate. Carver's knowledge allowed Nelson to run his ship among the shoals of St George's bank. The four larger ships abandoned the pursuit but the frigate continued to follow. With the odds evened, Albemarle backed sail. The French frigate declined the challenge and returned to her squadron.

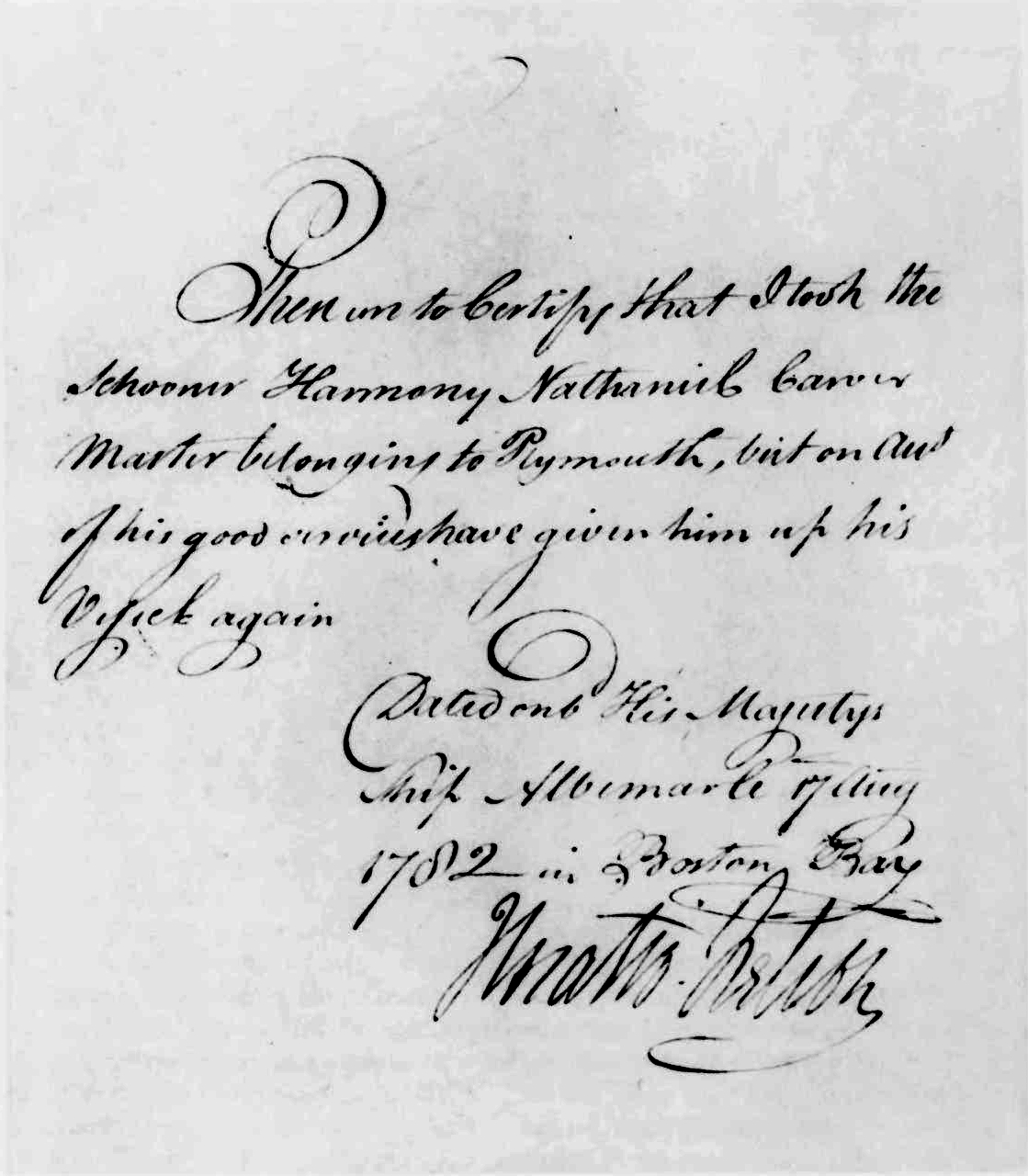
Certificate given by Horatio Nelson to Nathaniel Carver, master of the schooner Harmony of Plymouth

Nelson decided to reward Carver's invaluable assistance. "You have rendered us, sir, a very essential service and it is not the custom of English seamen to be ungrateful", Nelson explained as he presented Carver with his ship and a letter intended to protect him from further harassment. It stated, "These are to certify that I took the schooner Harmony, Nathaniel Carver, master, belonging to Plymouth, but on acc't of his good services have given him up his vessel again. Dated on b'd His Majesty's ship Albemarle, 7 Aug., 1782, in Boston Bay. Horatio Nelson".

Carver took his vessel and returned home to Plymouth but realising that having helped the enemy, he would be viewed as a traitor, he concocted a story to explain his good fortune. Carver claimed that he had borrowed another boat and sailed out to Albemarle with sheep and fresh vegetables which he then exchanged for his schooner. Nelson, Carver went on, was so overwhelmed with his kindness that he not only returned the vessel, he presented him with the letter noting his 'good services'.

This story apparently convinced his fellow countrymen, and indeed, when Nelson died in 1805, a letter from Boston arrived in England, which repeated Carver's version of events.

Nathaniel Carver died on 1 May 1815 at the age of 74. He is buried on the southeasterly side of Old Burial Hill in Plymouth, Massachusetts.
