= Duke of Bronte (1800 ship) =

British slave ship

History

Great Britain
- Namesake: Lord Nelson, Duke of Bronte
- Builder: Calcutta
- Launched: 1793, or 1794
- Renamed: Duke of Bronte (Note: King Ferdinand III of Sicily only created the title Duke of Bronte in 1799 for Admiral Lord Nelson. As of September 2023, it has proved impossible to track down Duke of Bronte's previous name via online resources. One listing of vessels built at Calcutta has no vessel launched there between 1790 and 1800 that fits her description.)
- Captured: March 1804
- Notes: Teak-built

General characteristics
- Tons burthen: 160, or 165, or 16545/94, or 168, or 170 (bm)
- Sail plan: Snow, then Ship-rigged
- Armament: 12, or 10 × 4-pounder guns
- Notes: Teak-built

Duke of Bronte (or Duke of Bronti, or Duke de Brunte) was launched in 1793 (or 1794), in India, under another name. She was renamed in 1800, in London. She then made two voyages as a slave ship in the triangular trade in enslaved people before a French privateer captured her in 1804.

== Career ==
Duke of Bronti was admitted to the Registry of Great Britain on 17 November 1800. She first appeared in Lloyd's Register in the supplemental pages to the 1800 volume. Her master was R. Beal, her owner Morton, and her trade London−Africa. She first appeared in the Register of Shipping in 1801, with R. Beale, master, and T. Morton, owner.

=== 1st voyage transporting enslaved people (1800–1801) ===
Captain Richard P. Beale sailed from London to the Rio Pongo on 1 December 1800. In 1800, 133 vessels sailed from English ports, bound for Africa to acquire and transport enslaved people. Only ten sailed from London.

Duke of Bronte took the captives she gathered to Demerara (what is now British Guiana), where she arrived in September 1801.

Between her next voyage transporting enslaved people, T. Moreton had sold her to Anthony Calvert, of Camden, Calvert and King.

=== 2nd voyage transporting enslaved people (1802–loss) ===
On 16 August 1802, Captain Beale sailed Duke of Bronte from London on her second voyage transporting enslaved people. In 1800, 155 vessels sailed from English ports, bound for Africa to acquire and transport enslaved people. Thirty sailed from London.

It is not clear where Beale and Duke of Bronte acquired captives, but on 18 July 1803, she delivered 168 to Kingston, Jamaica. (Note: Lloyd's List reported in September 1803, that Duke of Bronte had stopped at St Croix, before sailing for Havana.) She sailed from Jamaica, bound for London, on 16 November.

== Fate ==
On 3 February 1804, Lloyd's List reported that Duke of Bronti, bound for London, had to put back to Jamaica. Then on 22 June, Lloyd's List reported that a French privateer had captured Duke of Bronti as she was sailing from Jamaica to London and took her into Santiago de Cuba.

In 1804, 30 British slave ships were lost; only one was lost on her way back to Britain after having landed her captives. During the period 1793 to 1807, war, rather than maritime hazards or resistance by the captives was the greatest cause of vessel losses among British slave vessels.
