= List of shipwrecks in November 1828 =

The list of shipwrecks in November 1828 includes all ships sunk, foundered, grounded, or otherwise lost during November 1828.

== 3 November ==
List of shipwrecks: 3 November 1828
Ship	State	Description
Susanna	United Kingdom	The smack departed from Limerick for Liverpool, Lancashire. No further trace, presumed foundered in the Irish Sea with the loss of all hands.
Twee Gebroeders	(Denmark)	Duchy of Holstein: The ship departed from Kiel for King's Lynn, Norfolk, United Kingdom. No further trace, presumed foundered with the loss of all hands.

== 4 November ==
List of shipwrecks: 4 November 1828
Ship	State	Description
Snapper	(United Kingdom) New South Wales	The schooner was wrecked on Sandlewood Island, New Zealand with the loss of most of her crew.

== 7 November ==
List of shipwrecks: 7 November 1828
Ship	State	Description
Ann	United Kingdom	The ship was wrecked in Cloughey Bay. Her crew were rescued. She was on a voyage from Liverpool, Lancashire to Londonderry.
George Canning	United Kingdom	The brig was wrecked on Anticosti Island, Quebec City, Lower Canada, British North America with the loss of eight of her thirteen crew. She was on a voyage from Quebec City to Cork.
Hibernia	United Kingdom	The brig was wrecked on Anticosti Island. She was on a voyage from Quebec City to Portaferry, County Down.
Jane	United Kingdom	The ship was wrecked near Worms Head, Glamorgan. She was on a voyage from Chester, Cheshire to Carmarthen.
Speculator	(United Kingdom) British North America	The ship was wrecked at Broad Cova, Cape Breton Island, Nova Scotia. Her crew were rescued. She was on a voyage from Halifax, Nova Scotia to Prince Edward Island.
Yarm	United Kingdom	The ship was driven ashore and wrecked on the Spanish Battery Rocks, Tynemouth, Northumberland. Her crew survived. She was on a voyage from Whitby, Yorkshire to South Shields, County Durham.

== 8 November ==
List of shipwrecks: 8 November 1828
Ship	State	Description
Renown	United Kingdom	The ship sank on the Heaps Sand, in the North Sea off the coast of Essex. Her crew were rescued. She was on a voyage from Hamburg to London.

== 9 November ==
List of shipwrecks: 9 November 1828
Ship	State	Description
HMS Ariel	Royal Navy	The Cherokee-class brig-sloop departed from Falmouth, Cornwall. She was subsequently wrecked on Sable Island, Nova Scotia, British North America with the loss of all hands.
Hope	United Kingdom	The ketch foundered in the Atlantic Ocean 7 nautical miles (13 km) off Mizen Head, County Cork. Her crew survived. She was on a voyage from Newport, Monmouthshire to Cork.
Lady Williamson	United Kingdom	The ship was abandoned in the Atlantic Ocean. She was on a voyage from Liverpool, Lancashire to Seville, Spain. Her crew were rescued by Canning (United Kingdom).
Lorione Condue Fratello	Portugal	The ship was driven ashore and wrecked at Falmouth, Cornwall, United Kingdom. Her crew were rescued.
Voyager	United Kingdom	The ship was wrecked 20 nautical miles (37 km) from Ystad, Sweden. Her crew were rescued. She was on a voyage from Saint Petersburg, Russia to London.
Wifsta	Sweden	The ship was wrecked on North Ronaldsay, Orkney Islands, United Kingdom. She was on a voyage from Sundsvall to Cádiz, Spain.
William	United Kingdom	The smack ran aground on the Shipwash Sand, in the North Sea off the coast of Suffolk and consequently sank. Her crew were rescued.

== 10 November ==
List of shipwrecks: 10 November 1828
Ship	State	Description
John Pirie	United Kingdom	The ship was driven ashore at Calais, France. She was on a voyage from Hull, Yorkshire to Lisbon, Portugal.

== 11 November ==
List of shipwrecks: 11 November 1828
Ship	State	Description
Industry	United Kingdom	The ship wrecked on the Pladdy Lug, at the mouth of the Strangford River. She was on a voyage from Portaferry, County Down to Greenock, Renfrewshire.
Swift	United Kingdom	The ship was wrecked at Pittenweem, Fife. Her crew survived. She was on a voyage from Leith, Lothian to Pittenweem.

== 12 November ==
List of shipwrecks: 12 November 1828
Ship	State	Description
Alert	United Kingdom	The ship was in collision with Addison (United Kingdom) in the English Channel off Dunnose, Isle of Wight and foundered. Her crew were rescued by Addison. She was on a voyage from Poole, Dorset to Hamburg.
Anna Maria	United Kingdom	The sloop foundered off the coast of Cornwall. Her crew were rescued by Oakwell (United Kingdom).
Janet	United Kingdom	The ship was wrecked on Oronsay, Inner Hebrides.
Two Brothers	United Kingdom	The smack was wrecked at Dumfries with the loss of two lives. She was on a voyage from Donaghadee, County Down to Port Nessock, Wigtownshire.

== 13 November ==
List of shipwrecks: 13 November 1828
Ship	State	Description
Fullwood	United Kingdom	The ship was wrecked on Langlade Island, Saint Pierre and Miquelon with the loss of nine lives. She was on her maiden voyage, from Quebec City, Lower Canada, British North America to London.
Hayle	United Kingdom	The ship was wrecked on the Cannon Rock. She was on a voyage from Quebec City, Lower Canada, British North America to Belfast, County Antrim.
Janet	United Kingdom	The sloop was driven ashore on "Bona Island".
Union	United Kingdom	The ship was driven ashore at Aldeburgh, Suffolk.

== 14 November ==
List of shipwrecks: 14 November 1828
Ship	State	Description
Hoyle	United Kingdom	The ship ran aground on the Cannon Rock and was severely damaged. She was on a voyage from Quebec City, Lower Canada, British North America to Belfast, County Antrim.
Ibe	United Kingdom	The ship was wrecked near Soldier's Point, Anglesey. Her crew were rescued.
Lively	United Kingdom	The brig was run down and sunk in the North Sea off Huntcliff, Yorkshire by Nancy (United Kingdom). Her crew were rescued by Nancy.
Sir Thomas Cochrane	United Kingdom	The ship was lost off Cape St. Francis, Newfoundland, British North America.

== 15 November ==
List of shipwrecks: 15 November 1828
Ship	State	Description
John and Nancy	United Kingdom	The ship was wrecked on Sandhammer Point, Norway. She was on a voyage from Saint Petersburg, Russia to Newcastle upon Tyne, Northumberland.

== 16 November ==
List of shipwrecks: 16 November 1828
Ship	State	Description
Neptune	United Kingdom	The ship foundered in the North Sea off Aldeburgh, Suffolk. Her crew were rescued.
Pacific	United Kingdom	The ship was wrecked on Nickman's Ground, in the Baltic Sea off Hiiumaa, Russia. She was on a voyage from Vyborg, Grand Duchy of Finland to Hull, Yorkshire.

== 17 November ==
List of shipwrecks: 17 November 1828
Ship	State	Description
Zufreedenheit	Hamburg	The ship was wrecked on Baltrum, Kingdom of Hanover. Her crew were rescued. She was on a voyage from Hamburg to Hull, Yorkshire, United Kingdom.

== 18 November ==
List of shipwrecks: 18 November 1828
Ship	State	Description
Ceres	United Kingdom	The ship capsized in the Bristol Channel off Bridgwater, Somerset.
Lady McKenzie	United Kingdom	The ship struck a rock and sank in Killala Bay. Her crew were rescued. She was on a voyage from Killala, County Mayo to Liverpool, Lancashire.
William & Jane	United Kingdom	The ship was lost off the coast of Essex with the loss of all hands.

== 19 November ==
List of shipwrecks: 19 November 1828
Ship	State	Description
Christopher & William	United Kingdom	The ship foundered in the North Sea off Robin Hoods Bay, Yorkshire. Her crew were rescued.
Concordia	Netherlands	The galiot was driven ashore and wrecked at Wembury, Devon, United Kingdom. Her crew survived. She was on a voyage from Danzig, Prussia to Nantes, Loire-Inférieure, France.
Halcyon	United Kingdom	The ship was wrecked on the coast of Denmark. Her crew were rescued. She was on a voyage from Hull, Yorkshire to Saint Petersburg, Russia.
Mary	United Kingdom	The brig was driven ashore and severely damaged at Queen Anne's Battery, Plymouth, Devon. She was on a voyage from Cádiz, Spain to London.

== 20 November ==
List of shipwrecks: 20 November 1828
Ship	State	Description
Edward	United Kingdom	The ship was abandoned in the Irish Sea. She was on a voyage from Whitehaven, Cumberland to Dublin.
Psyche	United Kingdom	The ship was wrecked near Portrush, County Antrim. She was on a voyage from Belfast, County Antrim to Londonderry.

== 21 November ==
List of shipwrecks: 21 November 1828
Ship	State	Description
La Jeune Emma	France	The ship was wrecked on the Cefn Sidn Sands, in the Bristol Channel with the loss of thirteen lives. She was on a voyage from Martinique to Havre de Grâce, Seine-Inférieure.

== 22 November ==
List of shipwrecks: 22 November 1828
Ship	State	Description
Rapid	United Kingdom	The ship was lost near Varberg, Sweden. Her crew were rescued.

== 23 November ==
List of shipwrecks: 23 November 1828
Ship	State	Description
Cherub	United Kingdom	The ship was wrecked on "Steven's Head". She was on a voyage from Saint Petersburg, Russia to London.

== 24 November ==
List of shipwrecks: 24 November 1828
Ship	State	Description
Hunter	United States	The ship was wrecked at the mouth of the Garonne, France. She was on a voyage from Philadelphia, Pennsylvania to Bordeaux, Gironde, France.

== 25 November ==
List of shipwrecks: 25 November 1828
Ship	State	Description
Resolution	United Kingdom	The ship was wrecked at Teignmouth, Devon.

== 26 November ==
List of shipwrecks: 26 November 1828
Ship	State	Description
Edmund	Russia	The ship was lost on the Knock John sandbank. Her crew survived. She was on a voyage from Arkhangelsk to London, United Kingdom.
Felix	United Kingdom	The ship departed from Quebec City, Lower Canada, British North America for Liverpool, Lancashire. No further trace, presumed foundered with the loss of all hands.

== 27 November ==
List of shipwrecks: 27 November 1828
Ship	State	Description
Providence Increase	United Kingdom	The ship was wrecked on the Goodwin Sands, Kent. She was on a voyage from the Charente, France to London.
Princess of Wales	United Kingdom	Lloyd's List for 9 June 1829 reported the ship as missing since 27 November 1828.

== 28 November ==
List of shipwrecks: 28 November 1828
Ship	State	Description
La Jeune Emma	France	The West Indiaman was driven ashore and wrecked in Carmarthen Bay with the loss of thirteen of the nineteen people on board. She was on a voyage from Martinique to Havre de Grâce, Seine-Inférieure.

== 30 November ==
List of shipwrecks: 30 November 1828
Ship	State	Description
Diana	United Kingdom	The sloop was wrecked on Devar Island, Argyllshire with the loss of four of her five crew. She was on a voyage from Campbeltown, Argyllshire to Dublin.
Henry	United Kingdom	The ship was wrecked near "Owich" with the loss of all hands. She was on a voyage from Riga, Russia to London.
Martin	United Kingdom	The ship departed from Rotterdam, South Holland, Netherlands for Hull, Yorkshire. No further trace, presumed foundered in the North Sea with the loss of all hands.
William and Sarah	United Kingdom	The ship was driven ashore and wrecked at Waxholme, Yorkshire with the loss of three of the five people on board. Survivors were rescued by rocket apparatus.

== Unknown date ==
List of shipwrecks: Unknown date in November 1828
Ship	State	Description
Anne	United Kingdom	The ship struck the North Rock, off Strangford, County Down and was wrecked. Her crew were rescued. She was on a voyage from Liverpool, Lancashire to Londonderry.
Atwick	United Kingdom	The ship was driven ashore on Öland, Sweden. She was on a voyage from Saint Petersburg, Russia to London.
Prosperous	United Kingdom	The ship was wrecked on The Skerries, County Down with the loss of a crew member She was on a voyage from Whitehaven, Cumberland to Dublin.
Thomas Farrell	United Kingdom	The ship was driven ashore near Wexford.
Venus	United Kingdom	The ship was wrecked on The Skerries. Her crew were rescued by Fly (United Kingdom) She was on a voyage from Whitehaven to Cardiff, Glamorgan.
