= French capture of Gorée (1804) =

A French force from Cayenne under the command of lieutenant de vaisseau Jean-Michel Mahė recaptured Gorée from the British on 18 January 1804.

The vessels consisted of a naval schooner Vigie and three privateers. The troops consisted of a contingent from the 8th Demi-Brigade and another from the Cayenne Volunteers.

The French force stopped at Dakar, Senegal, on its way. At Dakar it added the schooner Rosalia and a detachment of troops from the 46th Brigade, and requisitioned the privateer Mon Oncle Thomas, from Rochelle, to join the expedition. Mon Oncle Thomas had put into Dakar to request an extension of her letter of marque. The Commandant promised to renew the letter on condition that Mon Oncle Thomas joined the expedition.

The French force of some 500–600 men anchored off the island late in the evening of 17 January. Next morning 240 troops in eight boats landed east of the town. They met resistance from the 40–70 men of the British garrison and civilians. The British suffered 9 men killed and 10 wounded; the French suffered 43 men killed and 32 wounded. Facing an overwhelming force, Colonel John Frazer, the British commander, surrendered and signed terms of capitulation. The French then occupied the town.

The French put the garrison aboard a sloop and sent them to Dakar. There the French made a cartel of the schooner Marengo and put their British captives on board. Marengo stopped at Teneriffe to replenish her supplies and arrived at Falmouth on 17 April.

In April 1804, Lloyd's List reported that the French had captured the British slave vessel Diligence, Bowland, master, and had taken her into Gorée. She had been on her way from London to Africa.

Recapture: The British recaptured Gorée on 7 March when Lieutenant Charles Pickford and a landing party from the 36-gun frigate HMS Inconstant forced the French garrison to surrender. Pickford had only been sent ashore to report on why the French held the island, and Inconstant returned on 8 March with an invasion force in four transports, not expecting the garrison to have been taken.

== The French vessels ==
| Vessel | Type | Captain | Guns | Complement (crew and troops) |
|---|---|---|---|---|
| Vigie | Schooner | lieutenant de vaisseau Mahé | 2 + 14 swivels | 90 |
| Renommée | Schooner | Citizen Renaud | 14 | 87 |
| Les Amis | Schooner | Citizen Baudrier | 14 | 85 |
| Oiseau | Schooner | | 10 | 80 |
| Rosalia | Schooner | ensign de vaisseau Ducraneau | 2 | 30 |
| Mon Oncle Thomas | Ship | One time capitaine de vaisseau Auguste Papin; acting Commodore | 20 | 230 |
