= Prince (1787 ship) =

British slave ship

History

Great Britain
- Name: Alexander
- Builder: Bristol
- Launched: 1785
- Renamed: Prince (1787)
- Fate: Foundered 13 March 1800

General characteristics
- Tons burthen: 273, or 300, or 301 (bm)
- Complement: 1794:30; 1797:30; 1799:25
- Armament: 1794:14 × 4-pounder guns; 1797:16 × 6-pounder guns; 1799:16 × 6&9-pounder guns

Prince was launched at Bristol in 1785 as Alexander and then made two complete voyages as a slave ship in the triangular trade in enslaved people. Her owners changed her name to Prince in 1787. As Prince, she made six more complete voyages as an enslaving ship. She sailed on enslaving voyages for owners in Bristol, Liverpool, and London. She foundered in 1800 as she was returning to England from her ninth, having delivered captives to Jamaica.

== Career ==
Alexander first appeared Lloyd's Register (LR) in 1786, there being no online issue for 1785.

Year	Master	Owner	Trade	Source & notes
1786	M'Tagart; Engeldue	M'Tagart	Bristol–Africa	LR

By then Alexander had already made one voyage as a slave ship.

1st voyage transporting enslaved people (1785–1786): Captain John McTaggart sailed from Bristol on 28 April 1785. Alexander acquired captives at Bonny and sailed from Africa on 15 September. She arrived at Grenada on 14 September with 307 captives. There she landed 273. Also, she had left Bristol with 49 crew members and had only 33 when she reached Grenada. She sailed from Grenada on 7 December, and arrived back at Bristol on 10 February 1786.

Alexander enlisted two more crew members at Bonny on 5 August; still, she arrived at Grenada with 33 crew members. There she discharged 13; six seamen enlisted on 15 December. She arrived back at Bristol with 25 crew members, one having died on the way.

Campbell, Baillie & Co., were the owner's agents at Grenada. They reported selling 273 captives at an average price of £35 5s 5d each. In addition, 34 captives were sickly and meagre and so had been sold at "vendue", i.e., for whatever little they could bring. That suggests that all 307 captives that arrived at Grenada had been sold. Although reportedly a great many captives had died, this appears, therefore, to have been on the Middle Passage.

On this voyage, Alexander's surgeon was Alexander Falconbridge. This was the third of four voyages that he made on board slave ships, the last being in 1787. He became an abolitionist and in 1788 published An Account of the Slave Trade on the Coast of Africa, an influential account of the trade in enslaved people.

2nd voyage transporting enslaved people (1786–1787): Captain William Engledue sailed from Bristol on 4 August 1786. Alexander acquired captives at Bonny. She arrived at Grenada 12 February 1787 with 350 captives and she landed 342. She had left Bristol with 45 crew members and she arrived at Grenada with 32. She left Grenada on 20 March, and arrived back at Bristol on 3 May.

Of the original crew of 45, 32 reached Grenada, where six were discharged. Six replacements were enlisted on 21 March 1787. Campbell, Baillie & Co. reported selling 342 captives for an average price of £30 11s 8d. Alexander sailed from Grenada in ballast.

Prince first appeared in Lloyd's Register (LR) in 1787, with her entry showing the name change from Alexander.

Year	Master	Owner	Trade	Source & notes
1787	Engledue; Durg	M'Tagert	Bristol–Africa	LR

3rd voyage transporting enslaved people (1787–1788): Captain James Clurg sailed from Bristol on 28 July 1787. Prince acquired 427 captives at Bonny and arrived at Buenos Aires and Montevideo in February 1788 with 355 captives, for a 17% mortality rate. She had left Bristol with 47 crew members and she arrived at South America with 34. She arrived back at Bristol on 28 July 1788.

On her way back from Buenos Aires, Prince stopped at Cadiz. She arrived back at Bristol with the same crew she had arrived at Buenos Aires with. On her return, her owners advertised her for sale, describing her as being of 270 tons burthen, sheathed with copper, and built for the enslaving trade.

Year	Master	Owner	Trade	Source & notes
1790	J.Clegg; Anstey	M'Taggert	Cadiz–Bristol; Bristol–Africa	LR; repairs 1790

4th voyage transporting enslaved people (1790–1791): Captain Micheal Hainsley (or Hansby, or Hansley, or Hensley) sailed from Bristol on 27 April 1790 to acquire captives at Bonny. Prince arrived at Port Royal on 22 November with 363 captives. (Note: A report in a local newspaper stated that she had arrived with 400 captives.) She had left Bristol with 40 crew members and she arrived at Port Royal with 35. She left Port Royal on 4 January 1791 and arrived back at Bristol on 10 February.

At the time Prince sailed Thomas Jones was her sole owner. Of her original crew, 35 were still on board when she reached Jamaica. Between 2 November and 6 December 1790 her captain discharged 22 crew members. The on 4 January 1791, she enlisted 13 new crew members.

Year	Master	Owner	Trade	Source & notes
1791	Anstey; Robson	T.Jones & Co.	Bristol–Africa	LR; repairs 1790

5th voyage transporting enslaved people (1791–1792): Captain Samuel Roscow (or Roscoe), sailed from Bristol on 29 July 1791. Prince acquired captives at Bonny and arrived at Jamaica on 1 April 1792. She had left Bristol with 37 crew members and she arrived with 31. She left Jamaica on 21 May, and arrived back at Bristol on 9 July. (Note: Samuel Roscow received a commission as a lieutenant in the Royal Navy on 25 January 1796.)

Prince had departed Bristol with 37 crew members; she returned with 19. While she was at Bonny, four of her original crew died. One man enlisted on Ceres. Prince arrived at St Vincent with 31 crew members. She discharged 17 there or at Jamaica. One man had died on 28 March, while she was on her way from St Vincent to Jamaica. Before she left for Bristol she enlisted six new crew members.

Year	Master	Owner	Trade	Source & notes
1792	Illegible; T.Jones	Jones & Co.	Bristol–Africa	LR; repairs 1790

6th voyage transporting enslaved people (1792–1794): Captain James Gordon, or possibly Jones, sailed from Bristol on 2 November 1792. Prince acquired captives at Bonny and delivered 285 to Kingston, Jamaica, on 19 August 1793. She had sailed with 32 crew members and she had 23 when she arrived at Kingston. She sailed from Kingston on 4 February 1794 and arrived at London on 7 May.

On her way to Jamaica, Prince stopped at Nevis. She sailed from there on 12 August 1793, in a hurricane. She arrived at Jamaica with 23 crew members and discharged 19 there. She enlisted nine new crew members before she left Jamaica. She discharged one man in Dover Roads on her way home and arrived at London with 12 crew members.

Thomas Jones sold Prince to Camden, Calvert and King, of London.

Year	Master	Owner	Trade	Source & notes
1795	R.Bebby	Calvert & Co.	London–Africa	LR; repairs 1790, & damages repaired 1794

While Prince was returning from her sixth enslaving voyage war with France had broken out. Captain Robert Bibby acquired a letter of marque on 28 October 1794.

On 4 November 1794, Prince, Bibby, master, was on her way from London to Africa when a gale pushed her aground in the Thames near Limehouse. She received so much damage that she would have to unload to repair.

7th voyage transporting enslaved people (1795–1796): Captain Robert Bibby sailed from London on 17 February 1795. In 1795, 79 vessels sailed from English ports, bound for Africa to acquire and transport enslaved people; 14 of these vessels sailed from London.

Prince started trading in Africa on 12 July, first at Cape Coast Castle and then at Anomabu. She sailed from Africa on 20 December, and arrived at Kingston on 2 February 1796 with 360 captives. She had suffered only one captive death on the passage from Africa. At some point Captain John Adams replaced Robert Bibby. Prince sailed from Kingston on 10 June and arrived back at London on 2 September.

After the passage of Dolben's Act in 1788, masters received a bonus of £100 for a mortality rate of under 2%; the ship's surgeon received £50. For a mortality rate between two and three per cent, the bonus was halved. There was no bonus if mortality exceeded 3%. (Note: At the time the monthly base wage for a captain of a slave ship out of Bristol was £5 per month.)

Year	Master	Owner	Trade	Source & notes
1796	R.Bebb; J.Kendall	Calvert & Co.	London–Africa	LR; raised and damages repaired 1794

8th voyage transporting enslaved people (1798): Captain John Kendall acquired a letter of marque on 23 November 1797. Prince sailed from Bristol on 2 February 1798, bound for West Africa. In 1798, 160 vessels sailed from English ports, bound for Africa to acquire and transport enslaved people. This was the largest number of vessels during the period 1795–1804. Three of these vessels sailed from Bristol.

Prince arrived at Barbados with 430 captives on 6 August. She sailed from Barbados on 4 September and arrived at Liverpool on 21 November. She had left Bristol with 48 crew members and she suffered four crew deaths on the voyage.

Year	Master	Owner	Trade	Source & notes
1799	J.Kendall; T.Smith	Smith & Co.	Liverpool–Africa	LR; raised and damages repaired 1794

9th voyage transporting enslaved people (1799–1800): Captain Thomas Smith acquired a letter of marque on 27 March 1799. Prince sailed from Liverpool on 5 May. In 1799, 156 vessels sailed from English ports, bound for Africa to acquire and transport enslaved people; 134 of these vessels sailed from Liverpool.

Prince acquired captives at Calabar and New Calabar, and arrived at Kingston on 26 November with 391 captives. She had left Liverpool with 46 crew members and she suffered six crew deaths on the voyage. She sailed from Kingston on 25 January 1800.

== Fate ==
On 13 March 1800, Prince sprang a leak in the Atlantic Ocean while returning to Liverpool from Jamaica. She had 8 feet (2.4 m) of water in her hold when Manilla, Glover, master, from Savannah, rescued the crew. After her crew abandoned Prince and her cargo of rum, coffee, and sugar, she sank. Manilla arrived at Falmouth on 31 March 1800.

In 1800, 34 British enslaving ships were lost. Of these, four were lost on the homeward leg of their enslaving voyages. Although Prince was lost to the perils of the sea, during the period 1793 to 1807, war, rather than maritime hazards or resistance by the captives, was the greatest cause of vessel losses among British slave vessels.
