= Molly (1778 ship) =

Liverpool slave ship and merchantman (1778–1832)

History

Great Britain
- Name: Molly
- Launched: 1778, Liverpool
- Fate: Last listed 1832

General characteristics
- Tons burthen: 221, or 239, or 260, or 279, o 2791/64, or 292, or 302, or 306 (bm)
- Length: 98 ft 0 in (29.9 m)
- Beam: 25 ft 9 in (7.8 m)
- Complement: 1778: 35; 1793: 30; 1796: 20; 1799: 25; 1804: 50; 1808: 30
- Armament: 1778: 14 × 6-pounder guns + 4 × 6-pounder coehorns; 1793: 12 × 6&9-pounder guns; 1796: 16 × 6&9-pounder guns; 1799: 16 × 6&9-pounder guns; 1804: 20 × 6&9-pounder guns; 1808: 18 × 12&9-pounder guns; 1808: 4 × 9-pounder guns + 16 × 9-pounder carronades; 1813: 12 × 9-pounder carronades; 1815: 10 × 12-pounder guns
- Notes: Two decks & three masts

Molly was launched at Liverpool in 1778 as a slave ship. Between 1778 and 1807 she made 18 complete voyages in the triangular trade in enslaved persons. During this period she also suffered one major maritime incident and captured two ships. After the end of Britain's involvement in the trans-Atlantic slave trade, Molly became a merchantman trading with the West Indies, Africa, Brazil, Nova Scotia, and Africa again. She was last listed in 1832, giving her a 54-year career.

== Career ==
Molly first appeared in Lloyd's Register (LR) in 1778.

| Year | Master | Owner | Trade | Source |
|---|---|---|---|---|
| 1778 | J.Kendall | W.Gregson | Liverpool–Africa | LR |

The British Admiralty had given notice in April 1777, that they were ready to issue letters of marque for privateers against the Americans. In March 1778, Great Britain broke off relations with France. Captain John Kendall acquired a letter of marque on 27 June 1778. He then sailed to Africa.

1st voyage transporting enslaved people (1778–1779): Molly's first slave trading voyage does not appear in the database of the Trans-Atlantic Slave Trade. On his way to Africa, in August 1778, Captain Kendall captured Venturane, which was on her way from Port-au-Prince to Le Havre with a valuable cargo of sugar, coffee, cotton, indigo, etc. Kendall then turned around, intending to escort Venturane to Liverpool. On the way, between Holyhead and the Tuskar Rock, Ireland, they encountered HMS Stag. Stag took over Venturane, which arrived at Liverpool on 17 December.

Lloyd's List reported in August 1779 that Molly, Kendall, master, had arrived at Jamaica from Africa with 412 captives. She had also captured a vessel on her way that had sold in Jamaica for £12,000. Molly, Kendall, master, arrived back at Leverpool in September.

2nd voyage transporting enslaved people (1780–1781): Captain John Kendall sailed from Liverpool on 24 March 1780. Moly began acquiring captives at Cape Coast Castle on 9 June. She acquired more captives at Anomabu, and then sailed from Africa on 3 November. She arrived at Kingston, Jamaica on 24 December, with 514 captives. She had buried 106 captives at sea on the Middle Passage, for a mortality rate of 17%. Molly arrived back at Liverpool on 15 June 1781. She had left Liverpool with 67 crew members and had suffered 13 crew deaths on her voyage.

3rd voyage transporting enslaved people (1781–1783): Captain Kendall sailed from Liverpool on 9 November 1781. Molly started acquiring captives at Anomabu on 6 February 1782. She sailed from Africa on 24 August, and arrived at Kingston on 23 October. She had embarked 670 captives, arrived with 629, and landed 611, for a 9% mortality rate. Molly sailed from Kingston on 2 February 1783, and arrived back at Liverpool on 7 March. She had left Liverpool with 70 crew members and had suffered four crew deaths on the voyage.

| Year | Master | Owner | Trade | Source & notes |
|---|---|---|---|---|
| 1783 | J.Kendall; J.Aspinall | Gregson & Co. | Liverpool–Africa | LR; thorough repair 1783 |

4th voyage transporting enslaved people (1783–1784): Captain James Aspinall sailed from Liverpool on 2 June 1783. Molly left the Gold Coast on 17 April 1784, and arrived Kingston on 29 May, having come via Barbados. She had embarked 550 captives and she arrived with 522, for a 5% mortality rate. Molly left Jamaica on 5 July, and arrived back at Liverpool on 17 August. She had left Liverpool with 52 crew members and had suffered three crew deaths on her voyage.

5th voyage transporting enslaved people (1784–1786): Captain Aspinall sailed from Liverpool on 18 November 1784. Molly started acquiring captives at Anomabu on 18 January 1785. She then gathered more captives at Cape Coast Castle, before leaving Africa on 28 June. She passed Barbados with 560 captives and arrived at Kingston on 22 August. She had embarked 570 captives and she arrived with 540, for a mortality rate of 5%. The Guineaman Molly, Aspinall, master, was driven ashore on 28 August at Jamaica in a hurricane. She was gotten off. She sailed from Kingston on 4 November and arrived back at Liverpool on 11 January 1786. She had left Liverpool with 50 crew members and she had suffered 14 crew deaths on her voyage.

| Year | Master | Owner | Trade | Source & notes |
|---|---|---|---|---|
| 1787 | R.Bibby | Gregson & Co. | Liverpool–Africa | LR; thorough repair 1783 & good repair 1785 |

6th voyage transporting enslaved people (1786–1788): Captain Robert Bibby sailed from Liverpool on 20 September 1786. Molly acquired her captives at the Cameroons and arrived at Dominica on 2 May 1788, with 320 captives. She sailed from Dominica on 30 May and arrived back at Liverpool on 4 July. She had left Liverpool with 45 crew members and had suffered 12 crew deaths on her voyage.

After the passage of Dolben's Act in 1788, masters received a bonus of £100 for a mortality rate of under 2%; the ship's surgeon received £50. For a mortality rate between two and three per cent, the bonus was halved. There was no bonus if mortality exceeded 3%.

7th voyage transporting enslaved people (1789–1790): Captain Robert Bibby sailed from Liverpool on 3 January 1789. Molly started acquiring her captives at Cape Coast Castle on 23 March, and sailed from Africa on 30 August. She arrived at Kingston on 31 October. She had embarked 410 captives and she arrived with 410, but landed 404, for a 2% mortality rate. She sailed from Kingston on 24 November and arrived back at Liverpool on 10 January 1790. She had left Liverpool with 42 crew members and had suffered no crew deaths on her voyage.

8th voyage transporting enslaved people (1790–1791): Captain Bibby sailed from Liverpool on 6 May 1790. Molly started acquiring her captives at Cape Coast Castle on 27 August, and sailed from Africa on 8 June 1791. She arrived at Kingston in July with 320 captives. She sailed from Kingston on 16 August, and arrived back at Liverpool on 8 October. She had left Liverpool with 35 crew members and had suffered two crew deaths on her voyage.

9th voyage transporting enslaved people (1792–1793): Captain Bibbi sailed from Liverpool on 2 March 1792. Molly started acquiring captives on 23 May, first at Fort Apollonia, then at Cape Coast Castle, and lastly at Anomabu. She left Africa on 1 January 1793, and arrived at St Vincent on 18 February 1793. She had embarked 390 captives and she arrived with 387, for a mortality rate of less than 1%. She arrived back at Liverpool on 19 April. Between her arrival at St Vincent and her return to Liverpool her master may have changed to John Bellis. Molly had left Liverpool with 34 crew members and she had suffered five crew deaths on her voyage.

| Year | Master | Owner | Trade | Source & notes |
|---|---|---|---|---|
| 1793 | R.Bibby; W.Grice | Case & Co. | Liverpool–Africa | LR; repairs 1791 & 1793 |

War with France had broken out shortly before Molly returned from her previous voyage. Her next captain, William Grice, acquired a letter of marque on 4 November 1793.

10th voyage transporting enslaved people (1793–1794): Captain William Grice sailed from Liverpool on 22 December 1793, bound for West Africa. Molly started gathering captives on 18 February 1794, and sailed from Africa on 16 April. She arrived at Kingston on 5 June. She had embarked 426 captives and she arrived with 418, for a 2% mortality rate. She arrived back at Liverpool on 12 October. She had left Liverpool with 34 crew members and she had suffered five crew deaths on her voyage.

| Year | Master | Owner | Trade | Source & notes |
|---|---|---|---|---|
| 1796 | W.Grice; E.Jackson | G.Case & Co. | Liverpool–Africa | LR; repairs 1791 & 1793, & almost rebuilt 1796 |

It is not clear what Molly did during 1795 and that part of 1796 before she underwent a rebuild. On 3 October 1796, Captain John Tobin acquired a letter of marque.

11th voyage transporting enslaved people (1796–1797): Captain John Tobin sailed from Liverpool on 16 October 1796, bound for West Africa. In 1796, 103 vessels sailed from English ports, bound for Africa to acquire and transport enslaved people; 94 of these vessels sailed from Liverpool.

On his way to Africa Tobin captured a Spanish ship of 300 tons that had been on her way from Cadiz to the River Plate. Molly arrived at Kingston on 10 July 1797, with 420 captives. She sailed for Liverpool on 1 September, and arrived there on 3 November. She had left Liverpool with 53 crew members and had suffered three crew deaths on her voyage.

12th voyage transporting enslaved people (1798–1799): Captain John Tobin sailed from Liverpool on 27 May 1798. In 1798, 160 vessels sailed from English ports, bound for Africa to acquire and transport enslaved people; 149 of these vessels sailed from Liverpool.

Molly acquired captives at Anomabu and arrived at Demerara on 18 December, with 432 captives. (She may have embarked 436 captives.) She arrived back at Liverpool on 18 March 1799, She had left Liverpool with 43 crew members and had suffered one crew death on her voyage.

Captain Thomas Tobin, John Tobin's younger brother, acquired a letter of marque on 18 May 1799.

13th voyage transporting enslaved people (1799–1800): Captain Thomas Tobin sailed from Liverpool on 2 June 1799. In 1799, 156 vessels sailed from English ports, bound for Africa to acquire and transport enslaved people; 134 of these vessels sailed from Liverpool.

Molly acquired captives at Bonny, and arrived at Kingston on 4 January 1800 with 430 captives. She sailed for Liverpool on 23 February and arrived there on 29 April. She had left Liverpool with 49 crew members and had suffered four crew deaths on her voyage.

14th voyage transporting enslaved people (1800–1801): Captain Thomas Tobin sailed from Liverpool on 14 July 1800. In 1800, 133 vessels sailed from English ports, bound for Africa to acquire and transport enslaved people; 120 of these vessels sailed from Liverpool.

Molly acquired captives at Bonny and arrived at St Vincent on 10 January 1801, with 280 captives. She sailed for Liverpool on 1 March, and arrived there on 9 April. She had left Liverpool with 47 crew members and had no crew deaths on her voyage.

15th voyage transporting enslaved people (1801–1802): Captain Thomas Tobin sailed from Liverpool on 2 July 1801. In 1801, 147 vessels sailed from English ports, bound for Africa to acquire and transport enslaved people; 122 of these vessels sailed from Liverpool.

Molly acquired captives at Bonny and sailed from there in company with Diligence and some other slave ships. Molly arrived at Kingston 10 January 1802, with 279 captives. (On the way she stopped at Demerara and possibly St Vincent.) She sailed from Kingston on 10 February, and arrived back at Liverpool on 6 April. She had left Liverpool with 43 crew members and had suffered four crew deaths on her voyage. (Although the Trans-Atlantic Slave Trade database shows Captain Thomas Livesley as having replaced Captain Thomas Tobin at some point, Lloyd's List's ship arrival and departure data shows Captain Tobin throughout the voyage.)

On 24 March 1804 Captain John Bean acquired a letter of marque.

16th voyage transporting enslaved people (1804–1805): Captain Bean sailed from Liverpool on 3 May 1804. In 1804, 147 vessels sailed from English ports, bound for Africa to acquire and transport enslaved people; 126 of these vessels sailed from Liverpool.

Molly acquired captives at Calabar and arrived at Suriname on 22 November, with 279 captives. She sailed from Suriname on 24 January 1805, and arrived back at Liverpool on 28 March. She had sailed from Liverpool with 48 crew members, and she had suffered 18 crew deaths on her voyage.

17th voyage transporting enslaved people (1805–1806): Captain Bean sailed from Liverpool on 28 June 1805. Molly arrived at Zion Hill, Tobago on 14 January 1806. She had been at St Kitts. She sailed for Liverpool on 10 February, and arrived there on 11 April, from Tobago. She had left Liverpool with 55 crew members and had suffered five crew deaths on her voyage. Molly arrived at Liverpool with 120 casks of palm oil, 20 tons of barwood, one ton of ivory, 80 hogsheads and 13 barrels of sugar, 12 puncheons of rum, 3 puncheons of lime juice, one puncheon of shrub, and five bales of cotton.

| Year | Master | Owner | Trade | Source & notes |
|---|---|---|---|---|
| 1807 | J.Bean; W.Richards | Case & Co. | Liverpool–Africa | LR; almost rebuilt 1796 & large repair 1806 |

18th voyage transporting enslaved people (1806–1807): Captain Bean sailed from Liverpool on 17 April 1806. Molly acquired captives at Calabar. She arrived at Trinidad on 3 March 1807, with captives. She sailed from Trinidad on 14 April and arrived back at Liverpool on 2 June.

Molly had arrived back after 1 May 1807, the day the Slave Trade Act 1807 took effect, which ended British involvement in the trans-Atlantic slave trade. Her next voyage was as a West Indiaman, sailing to Trinidad.

Captain William Richards acquired a letter of marque on 4 March 1808.

| Year | Master | Owner | Trade | Source & notes |
|---|---|---|---|---|
| 1808 | Richards; W.Price | G.Case | Liverpool–Trinidad | LR; almost rebuilt 1796, & large repair 1806 |
| 1809 | W.Price | Aspinall & Co. | Liverpool–Africa | LR; almost rebuilt 1796 & large repair 1806 |
| 1810 | H.Baldwin | Aspinall & Co. | Liverpool–Africa | LR; almost rebuilt 1796 & large repair 1806 |
| 1812 | H.Baldwin; R.Jackson | Aspinall & Co. | Liverpool–Africa | LR; almost rebuilt 1796 & large repair 1806 |

In December 1812, Lloyd's List reported that Molly, of Liverpool, Jackson, master, had on 25 November run into a large ship. Molly had sustained so much damage that she had had to put back to repair.

| Year | Master | Owner | Trade | Source & notes |
|---|---|---|---|---|
| 1813 | R.Jackson | Seller & Co. | Liverpool–Africa | LR; almost rebuilt 1796, & large repair 1806 & 1812 |
| 1814 | R.Jackson; J.Garner | Seller & Co. | Liverpool–Africa | LR; almost rebuilt 1796, & large repair 1812 |
| 1815 | A.Scotland | Henderson | Liverpool–Brazils | LR; almost rebuilt 1796, & large repair 1812 |
| 1816 | A.Scotland; Stonehouse | Henderson | Liverpool–Brazils | LR; almost rebuilt 1796, & large repair 1812 |
| 1819 | Stonehouse; J.Boggie | Henderson | Liverpool–Madeira; Liverpool-Nova Scotia | LR; almost rebuilt 1796, & large repair 1812 |
| 1820 | J.Boggie; Barnes | Captain & Co. | Liverpool-Nova Scotia | LR; almost rebuilt 1796, & large repair 1812 |
| 1821 | T.Barnes; A.Elliot | J.Bozzie | Liverpool-Portsmouth | LR; almost rebuilt 1796, & large repair 1812 |
| 1822 | A.Elliot | J.Tobin | Liverpool-Africa | LR; almost rebuilt 1796, & small repairs 1821 |
| 1823 | A.Elliot; J.Brown | J.Tobin | Liverpool-Africa | LR; almost rebuilt 1796, & small repairs 1821 |
| 1824 | J.Brown; Towne | J.Tobin | Liverpool-Africa | LR; almost rebuilt 1796, & small repairs 1821 |
| 1826 | P.Sinclair | J.Tobin | Liverpool-Africa | LR; almost rebuilt 1796, & small repairs 1821 |

In 1826 Molly brought back to Liverpool 783 casks of palm oil, 524 elephant teeth (ivory tusks), and 15 tons of dunnage wood.

== Fate ==
Molly was last listed in 1832.
