= Suzanne Bambridge =

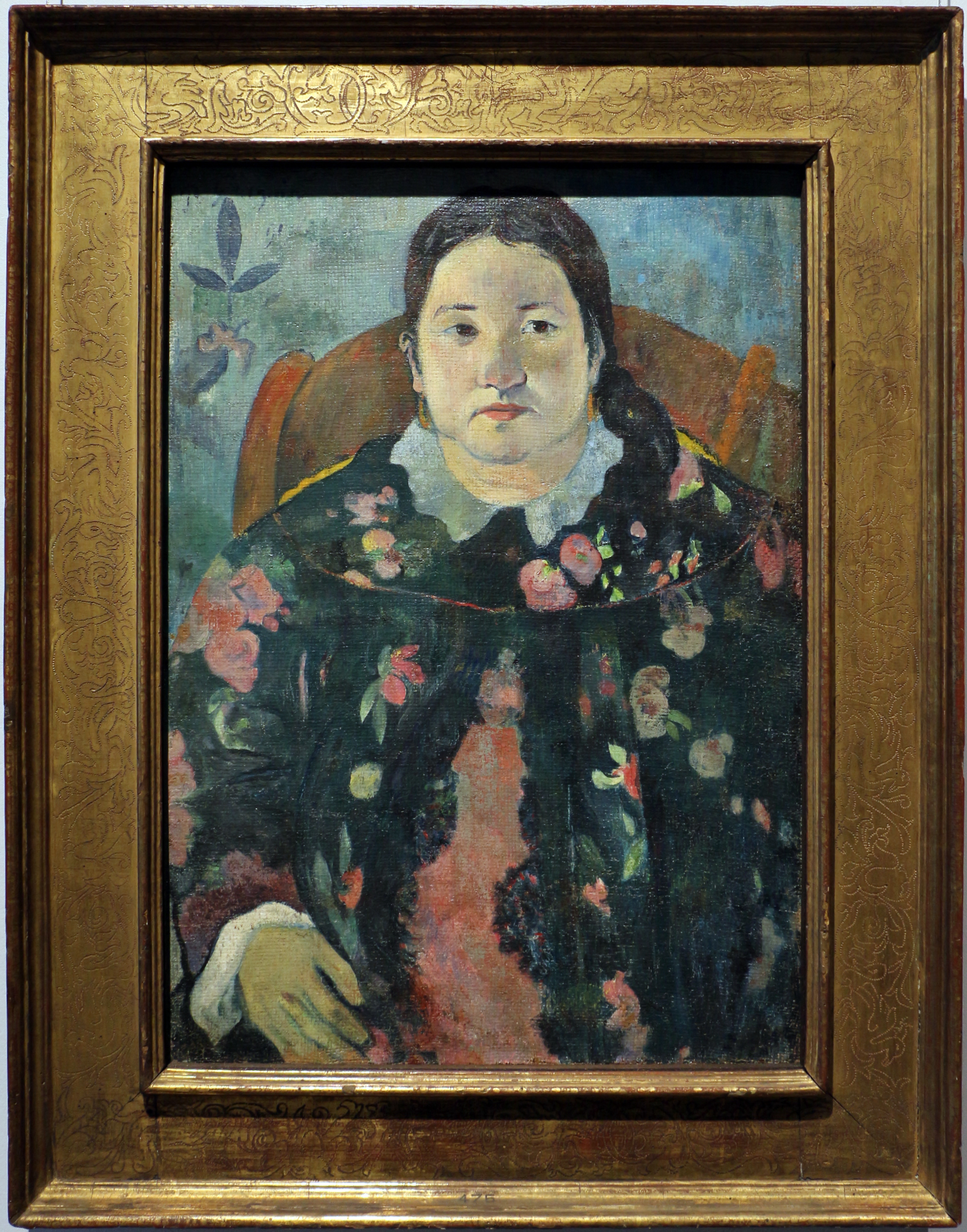
Gauguin's portrait of Suzanne Bambridge, 1891

Suzanne Teriimarama Bambridge (1844–1911) was a leading social figure in Tahiti in the late nineteenth century.

== Life ==
Bambridge was the daughter of Thomas Bambridge and Maraea Haumani O'Connor. Her English father was a missionary in Papeete and Tahitian-Irish O'Connor was his second wife. In 1891 French artist Paul Gauguin, recently arrived in Papeete, secured a commission to paint Bambridge's portrait.

Her great-grandfather, James O'Conner, had been a sailor aboard the whaler Matilda, which had wrecked on Moruroa on 25 May 1792. The crew had survived and reached Tahiti on 5 March. O'Conner and a handful of other survivors declined later opportunities to return to Britain, preferring to settle in Tahiti.
