= Malouin (1803 ship) =

History

France
- Name: Malouin
- Commissioned: June 1803
- Captured: July 1803

General characteristics
- Tons burthen: 92 (bm)
- Complement: 61
- Armament: 4 guns

Malouin was a schooner commissioned as a privateer in Saint-Malo in June 1803 under Captain Loriot (or L'Orient). A British privateer captured her in July 1803.

== Career ==
Malouin may have twice cruised with some success during the French Revolutionary Wars, though that may have involved a different vessel. The Saint-Malo merchant Thomazeau armed Malouin in 1803.

In July 1803 Lloyd's List reported that the frigate HMS Apollo had captured Demerara Packet, but that the French privateer Malouin had re-captured her. Then HMS Isis re-captured Demerara Packet. (Note: Demerara Packet was a Dutch ship. Malouin had captured Demerara Packet at 46°16′N 15°8′W.)

Malouin had also captured Little Jane, which had been sailing from Jamaica to London and sent Little Jane into Passage.

Lloyd's List reported on 12 July 1803, that a French privateer had captured Princess of Wales, Griegg, master, as she was sailing from Jamaica to London. However, the British privateers Lord Nelson and Trimmer had retaken her and sent her into Plymouth. The French privateer Malwan or Malouin, of four guns, out from Saint-Malo 15 days, had captured Princess of Wales on 2 July. The two British privateers recaptured her on 6 July. Princess of Wales was carrying a valuable cargo of 580 hogsheads of sugar and 150 logs. Princess of Wales had only two guns, and the French prize master had only 10 men to man them and sail her, but he fought for eight hours before striking. (Note: Lord Nelson was a schooner of 69 tons (bm), whose master, William Crowe, had received a letter of marque on 27 May 1803. She had a crew of 40 men and was armed with eight 3&4-pounder guns and two swivel guns. Trimmer, of Portsmouth, was armed with two or four 4-pounder guns and eight swivels. She had a crew of 20 men under the command of Henry Haskell, who had received a letter of marque on 8 June 1803.) Captain Gregg was surprised to discover Princess of Wales in the Catwater; he had assumed that her captor had taken her to France. He had been a prisoner on Malouin, and had come into Plymouth on 16 July when the privateer brig Speedwell had captured Malouin a few days earlier and brought her into Plymouth. The capture had taken place at 43°40′N 15°00′W. (Note: Speedwell, of London, "Cromer, John L.", master, was of 152 tons (bm). She was armed with twelve 4-pounder guns and had a crew of 30 men. Her letter of marque was dated 1 June 1803.) (Note: Princess of Wales was said to be worth £36,000. Lord Nelson and Trimmer would have been entitled to a portion of the value as marine salvage.)

Speedwell would have been unable to capture Malouin if Malouin had been able to get her sweeps out. However, there were 46 English prisoners aboard Malouin and they hindered her maneuvers.
