= Argus (1807 ship) =

UK slave and merchant ship 1807–1810

History

United Kingdom
- Name: Argus
- Owner: Camden, Calvert and King
- Acquired: 1807 by purchase of a prize
- Fate: Condemned March 1810

General characteristics
- Tons burthen: 190 (bm)
- Armament: 8 × 9-pounder carronades

Argus was launched in 1797 in the United States, possibly under another name, and taken as a French prize circa 1807. She entered United Kingdom records in 1807 when she became a slave ship in the triangular trade in enslaved people. After her one slave trading voyage she continued trading with Africa. She was condemned in March 1810.

== Career ==
Argus first entered Lloyd's Register (LR), in 1807.

Year	Master	Owner	Trade	Source
1807	Fraser	Calvert & Co.	London–Africa	LR

Captain Peter John Fraser sailed from London on 14 April 1807. The Slave Trade Act 1807, which banned British participation in the slave trade, took effect on 1 May, but as Argus had cleared customs outbound before the deadline her voyage was still legal. She started acquiring captives on 8 July, first at Cape Coast Castle, and then at Accra. She arrived at Kingston on 28 January 1808 with 243 captives. She left Kingston on 17 March and arrived back at London on 15 May.

== Fate ==
Argus continued to trade with Africa. In 1809 she was reported at Africa, still with Frazer, master. On 23 March 1810 she arrived at Kinsale from Africa with Campbell, master, who apparently had replaced Frazer. On 18 May Ant, Welch, master, arrived at Gravesend from Kinsale with part of Argus's cargo. Argus had been condemned at Kinsale.
