= Baron de Binder (1782 ship) =

History

France
- Name: Baron de Binder
- Owner: Pierre-Jacques Meslé de Grandclos (1782– )
- Launched: 1782
- Renamed: 1793: Duguay-Trouin; 1795: Calypso; 1797: Duguay-Trouin
- Captured: 2 February 1798

General characteristics
- Tons burthen: 400, or 500, or 602 (bm)
- Complement: 160 (French Navy)
- Armament: 22 × 6-pounder guns (French Navy)

Baron de Binder (or Baron Bender) was launched in 1782. She made two voyages as a slave ship in the triangular trade in enslaved people. Then in 1793, she became the privateer Duguay-Trouin. After one cruise, the French Navy requisitioned her, and she served as a corvette for almost three years. The navy returned her to her owners, who sailed her as a privateer again. In 1798. the British Royal Navy captured her.

== Career ==
=== Slave ship ===
1st voyage transporting enslaved people (1782–1783): Captain Daniel Deslands sailed from Saint-Malo on 31 December 1782. Baron de Binder gathered 840 captives at Cabinda and sailed from Africa on 22 July 1783. She arrived at Cap Français on 13 September with 804 captives.

It is currently not clear what Baron de Binder did between her two voyages transporting enslaved people.

2nd voyage transporting enslaved people (1789–1790): On 15 June 1789, Captain Toussaint Le Forestier sailed from Saint-Malo. Baron de Binder gathered 463 captives on the French Gold Coast. She arrived at Cap Français on 30 May 1790 with 463, and landed 458 captives.

=== Privateer ===
In March 1793, two Saint Malo merchants fitted her out and commissioned her as the privateer corvette Duguay-Trouin. A 1793 prospectus from her owners advertised her as having "steel sheathing", which Demerliac conjectures might have been an armour belt at her waterline. On her first cruise in 1793 under Captain Dufresne Le Gué, (Note: Demerliac says J. Pinon.) she captured two merchant vessels, Bonne Espérence and the 520 ton (bm) Albemarle of London. Albemarle was returning to London from Bombay and Duguay-Trouin set her into Morlaix.

These two vessels yielded livres 1,501,848 in prize money.

=== Navy corvette ===
In May 1794, the French Navy requisitioned Duguay-Trouin and commissioned her as a corvette of 22 guns. On 23 December, she was under the command of lieutenant de vaisseau Eudes-Dessaudrais. Her role was to escort convoys between Breast and Île-d'Aix Roads.

The Navy renamed her Calypso in May 1795. It returned her to her owners around February 1797.

=== Privateer ===
On her second cruise as a privateer, in the winter of 1797, Duguay-Trouin was under the command of Captain Nicholas Legué and had a crew of 172 men.

== Captured ==
Shannon captured Duguay-Trouin on 2 February 1798. At the time of her capture Duguay-Trouin was armed with 24 guns and had a crew of 150 men.
