= Matilda (1790 ship) =

British convict transport, merchant ship, and whaler 1790–1792

History

Kingdom of France
- Launched: 1779

Great Britain
- Name: Matilda
- Acquired: 1790
- Fate: Wrecked in 1792
- Notes: Three decks. Copper sheathing. Underwent a good repair in 1791

General characteristics
- Tons burthen: 460 (bm)
- Draft: 18 ft (5.5 m)
- Sail plan: Full-rigged ship

Matilda was a ship built in France and launched in 1779. She was captured by the British and put into the Grenada trade. In 1787 she was sent to the Malabar coast of India.

She became a whaling ship for the British company Camden, Calvert and King, making a whaling voyage while under the command of Newcastle master mariner Matthew Weatherhead to New South Wales and the Pacific in 1790.

She enters Lloyd's Register in 1791 with Weatherhead as master, Calvert & Co., as owners, and trade London—Botany Bay. That year, either owned or leased by Samuel Enderby & Sons, she transported convicts from England to Australia as part of the third fleet.

She departed Portsmouth on 27 March 1791 and arrived on 1 August in Port Jackson, New South Wales. She had embarked 250 male convicts in England, 25 of whom died during the voyage. Nineteen officers and men of the New South Wales Corps provided the guards. On her arrival at Port Jackson the ship required repairs.

After he had delivered his convicts, Weatherhead took Matilda whaling in the New South Wales fishery or off Van Diemen's Land.

She sailed on 28 December for Peru via the Marquesas Islands in company with another third fleet transport and whaler the Mary Ann. The two ships arrived at Tahiti and touched briefly at Oaitepeha Bay on the eastern side of the island. They departed together but parted company several days later.

== Loss ==
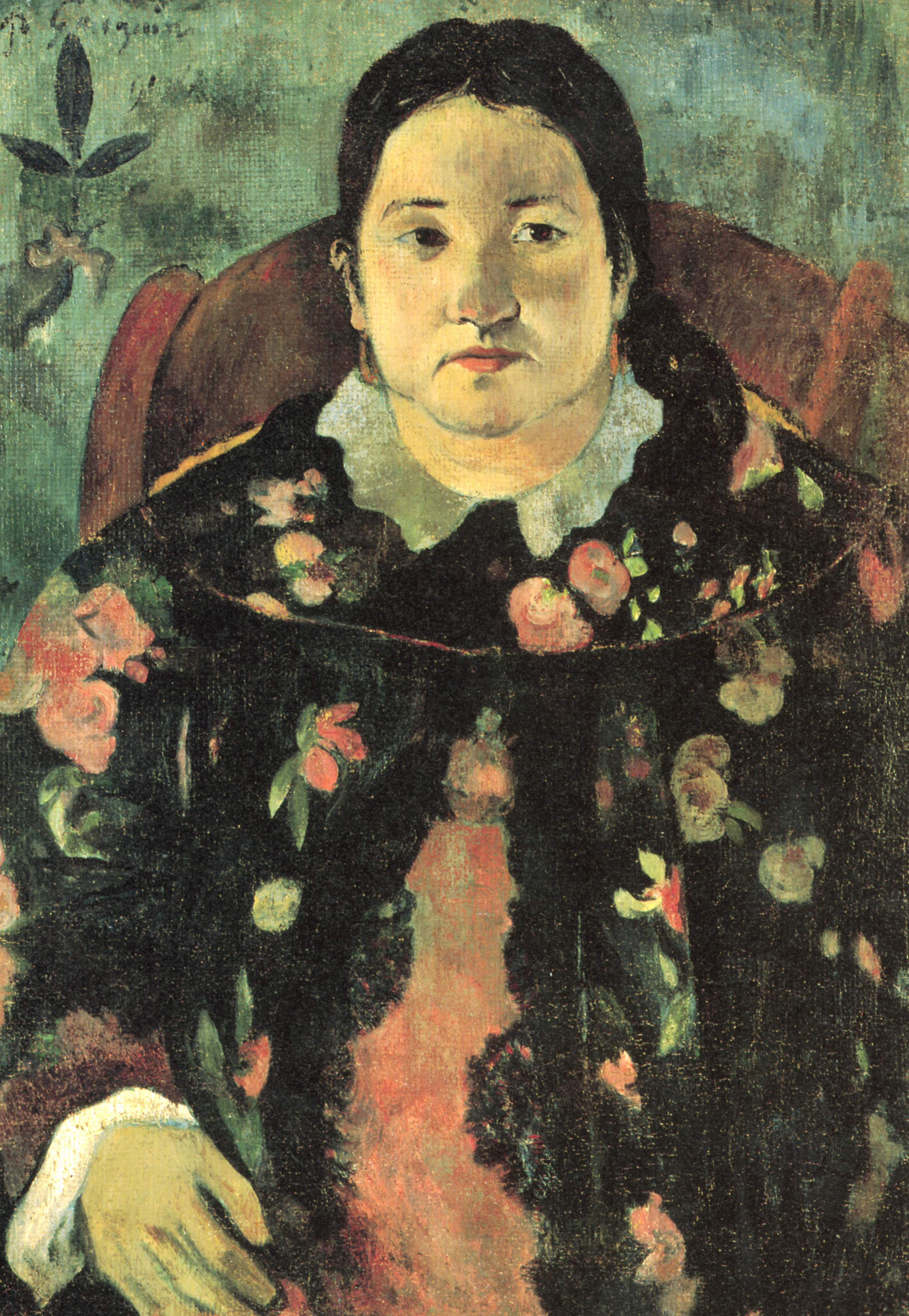
Suzanne Bambridge, great-granddaughter of James O'Connor, painted by Paul Gauguin in 1891.

Matilda was wrecked on 25 February 1792 on a shoal, later named Matilda Island. (Note: Frederick Beechey of HMS Blossom, who discovered the wreckage in 1826, confirmed that Matilda Island was actually Moruroa.) The crew were saved and returned to Tahiti on 5 March 1792.

The survivors, 21 crew members and one convict stowaway, were later rescued. Captain William Bligh, on HMS Providence, picked up some at Matavai Bay, while Jenny and Britannia rescued others. Six (James O'Connor, James Butcher, John Williams, William Yaty, Andrew Cornelius Lind and Samuel Pollend) refused to return, and chose to settle in Tahiti.
