= Admiral Barrington (1781 ship) =

British merchant ship (1781–1797)

History

France
- Launched: 1781
- Fate: Captured 1782

Great Britain
- Name: Admiral Barrington
- Namesake: Samuel Barrington
- Owner: Godfrey Thornton; Calvert & Co. (Note: The owners were the partners Anthony Calvert, Thomas King, and William Camden. Anthony Calvert was the managing partner of Camden, Calvert, and King from 1783 until the partnership was dissolved in 1800.)
- Acquired: 1783
- Fate: Captured by a privateer in 1797

General characteristics
- Tons burthen: 527 (bm)
- Length: 119 ft (36.3 m) (overall); 94 ft 10 in (28.9 m) (keel)
- Beam: 32 ft 4 in (9.9 m)
- Depth of hold: 13 ft 9 3/4 in (4.2 m)
- Sail plan: Ship
- Complement: 84 (Indiaman)
- Armament: 18 guns (Indiaman)
- Notes: Copper sheathed in 1798

Admiral Barrington was a ship built in 1781, in France and was employed as a French West Indiaman, though under a different name. She was captured in 1782, and was later sold to Godfrey Thornton. Thornton renamed her Admiral Barrington. She then made one full voyage for the East India Company (EIC) from 1787 till 1788. Her most notable voyage was as a convict ship in the third fleet to Australia. On her return voyage in 1793, pirates attacked her near Bombay and murdered almost her entire crew. She was apparently recovered, only to have a French privateer capture her in the West Indies in 1797. The privateer took her to Bordeaux, where she was sold.

== EIC extra ship ==
At the time of Admiral Barrington's first voyage for the EIC, her principal managing owner was Godfrey Thornton. She served as an extra ship, meaning that the EIC had chartered her. Under the command of Captain Charles Lindegreen she sailed for China, leaving Portsmouth on 21 February 1787. She reached False Bay, South Africa, on 11 May, and Whampoa on 21 August. On her return trip to Britain she reached Macao on 7 January 1788, Saint Helena on 22 April, and Deptford on 1 August.

In mid-December 1788, news reached London that Admiral Barrington was frozen up at Cronstadt and would winter there. Lloyd's Register for 1789 gives her master's name as J. Arnott, her owner as G. Thornton, and her trade as London-Copenhagen.

== Third Fleet ==
Under the command of Robert Abbon Mash, she sailed from Portsmouth, England, on 27 March 1791, as part of the third fleet and arrived in Port Jackson, New South Wales on 16 October. She brought with her Captain William Paterson, three noncommissioned officers, and 24 privates of the New South Wales Corps. They served as guards for the 300 male convicts on board. In addition, four free women accompanied their convict husbands, together with two children. Ninety-seven persons were sick on board the ship when she arrived. Thirty-six convicts died during the voyage, i.e., she delivered 264 alive. She was the last of the eleven ships to arrive in Sydney. On arrival Admiral Barrington and three of the other transports were found to have aboard, “a very considerable quantity of copper, lead, iron and cordage,” which Governor Phillip thought had been brought for the purposes of illicit trade.

== Pirate attack ==
Admiral Barrington left Port Jackson on 6 January 1792, to whale off the coast of Australia. At some point she visited Norfolk Island.

Originally, before she left for Botany Bay, her captain's intent was to go to China to pick up a back-haul cargo for the EIC. Instead, from New South Wales she sailed to Batavia. Before leaving Sydney, she is thought to have taken aboard “200 tons of red hardwood described as ‘mahogany’”. This cargo may have been Australia’s first exports.

She left Batavia and reached the coast of India near Bombay. However, a gale of wind forced her on shore on one of the "Malouine Islands" (sic). (Note: Other accounts give the name of the island as Malwan. There is a Malwan on the Indian coast, with an offshore island that is the locus of Sindhudurg Fort. However, the town and fort are some 500 kilometers south of Bombay.) There the natives on the island are reported to have murdered her crew, except for the master, chief mate, and surgeon, who swam to the safety of a British East India Company country ship that was anchored near the island. (Note: Captain Robert Abbon Mash went on to command Princess of Wales.) But recent research suggests the crew were not murdered, although the vessel and her cargo were captured by pirates.

== Fate ==
Although the Bombay papers in 1793, reported that Admiral Barrington had been taken by Malwan pirates and never recovered, apparently Admiral Barrington was salvaged as she returned to commercial service. In 1797, she was sailing in the West India trade when the French privateer Diede captured her and sent her into Bordeaux. (Note: There is no trace in standard reference sources of any privateer named Diede. It is more probable that the privateer's name was Décidé, which was a rather common name for privateers and French naval vessels. Among the two privateers named Décidé in service in 1797, the most likely Diede is a 180-ton 16-gun brig nicknamed "the black corsair". She was under Captain Beck (or Beeck) until June 1797, then Lanthomme until August, and eventually under Michel Noel until December 1797, when she was sold.)
