= HMS Albemarle (1779) =

British sailing frigate (1779–1784)

History

France
- Name: Ménagère
- Builder: Toulon shipyard
- Acquired: Purchased in May 1779
- Captured: 24 September 1779, by the Royal Navy

Great Britain
- Name: HMS Albemarle
- Acquired: Captured on 24 September 1779
- Commissioned: 22 November 1779
- Fate: Sold on 1 June 1784

Great Britain
- Name: Albemarle
- Owner: Calvert & Co.
- Operator: East India Company, 1791–1793
- Acquired: 1784 or 1790-1 by purchase
- Captured: May 1793
- Fate: Subsequent fate is currently unknown

General characteristics
- Tons burthen: 520, or 530, or 543 (bm)
- Length: 125 ft (38.1 m)
- Beam: 31 ft 7 in (9.6 m)
- Depth of hold: 13 ft 7 1/2 in (4.15 m)
- Propulsion: Sails
- Sail plan: Full-rigged ship
- Complement: At capture:160; British service: 200
- Armament: As built: 28 × 8-pounder guns; At capture: 30 guns; After fitting in 1781: Upper deck: 24 × 9-pounder guns; QD: 4 × 3-pounder guns

HMS Albemarle was a 28-gun sixth rate frigate of the Royal Navy. She had been built as the French merchantman Ménagère, which the French Navy purchased in 1779. A British squadron captured her in September and she was commissioned into service with the Royal Navy. Amongst her commanders in her short career was Captain Horatio Nelson, who would later win several famous victories over the French. The Navy sold her in 1784. She subsequently became a merchant vessel again. In 1791 she transported convicts to Port Jackson as part of the third fleet. She then sailed to India where she picked up a cargo on behalf of the British East India Company. As she was returning to England a French privateer captured her.

== Career ==
Ménagère was launched in 1776 as a merchant vessel. The French Navy purchased her at Bordeaux in May 1779.

The French government despatched her from Bordeaux for Cap-François, together with other transport vessels. On 22 and 23 September, a Royal Navy squadron under William Hotham, captured seven members of the convoy off San Domingo. The actual captor may have been HMS Albion, though supporting evidence is scarce.

Vessel	Tons (bm)	Guns	Complement	Cargo
President Le Berthun, or Président le Berthon	550	30	160	Provisions
Menagere, or Ménegère	600	30	160	Provisions
Hercule	550	30	160	Provisions
Marechal de Brissac, or Maréchal de Mouchy	400	22	150	Provisions
Juste	200	10	35	Provisions
Cherie	180	8	35	Provisions
Jeanne Henriette	160	2	30	Merchandise

The prize court at Barbados condemned Ménagère on 17 November. At that point the Royal Navy acquired her, the only one out of the seven vessels that the squadron had captured that it wanted to keep. (Note: The Ménagère that James Luttrell's HMS Mediator captured at the action of 12 December 1782, is sometimes confused with this ship.)

Captain John Thomas commissioned Ménagère on 22 November, and brought with him the officers and crew from his previous command, the sloop HMS Barbadoes. An additional 44 men transferred from Hotham's flagship HMS Grafton; Albemarle was duly assigned to serve off the Leeward Islands. Captain Thomas Taylor succeeded Thomas on 12 June 1780. Under Taylor, Albemarle was part of Sir George Rodney's fleet during the Battle of Martinique in April 1780, but did not herself take part in the battle.

Albemarle remained in the Caribbean and was in Carlisle Bay, Barbados, when a hurricane that began on 11 October damaged her. Taylor remained in command while repairs were carried out that allowed her to sail for Britain as a convoy escort. She was paid off in February 1781.

=== Under Nelson ===
Albemarle was then fitted and coppered at Woolwich between 3 July and 12 October 1781. The work cost £7,302 4s 1d. While Albemarle was undergoing this fitting, the 22-year-old Captain Horatio Nelson commissioned her on 15 August 1781 for the North Sea and the English Channel.

Nelson was initially enthusiastic about his new command, comparing her to HMS Enterprize, which was also refitting, and declaring in a letter:

Yesterday I went down to Woolwich with Maurice, and hoisted my Pendant; and I am perfectly satisfied with her, as a twenty-eight gun Frigate. She is in dock, alongside the Enterprize, and in some I think, excels her. She has a bold entrance and a clean run.

Nelson's companion and former commanding officer, Captain William Locker, was more experienced and privately doubted Albemarle's capabilities. Nelson sailed as a convoy escort to Denmark with the Enterprize and Argo on 31 October 1781. While returning to Britain, the convoy ran into heavy weather, and was forced to seek shelter in Yarmouth Roads. On 26 January one of the merchants collided with the Albemarle, an accident that nearly caused the loss of both ships. On her return Albemarle again underwent fitting between February and April 1782, this time at Portsmouth.

Next, Albemarle sailed on 7 April 1782 as escort to a convoy to Quebec. The convoy arrived on 27 May 1782, after which Nelson continued to operate off the North American coast. He narrowly escaped capture when on 14 August a French squadron under Louis-Philippe de Vaudreuil chased him off Boston.

Nelson did however capture a number of prizes during his cruise, including the French storeship Reine de France. Nelson then requested and received a transfer to the squadron under Admiral Samuel Hood, with whom he sailed to Jamaica. Notable amongst Nelson's services in the West Indies in this period was his unsuccessful attack on the French garrison at Turk's Island on 7 and 8 March 1783.

== Sale ==
Nelson was HMS Albemarle's third and last commander. She was paid off on 3 July 1783 and subsequently sold at Portsmouth for the sum of £370 on 1 June 1784.

== Merchant vessel ==
Albemarle then disappears from readily accessible records for some years. In 1791 she reappears in the supplemental pages to Lloyd's Register. Albemarle, French-built, of 530 tons, appears with Js. Boulton, master, Calvert & Co., owner, and trade, London-Botany Bay. Calvert & Co. then chartered her to the British East India Company (EIC), who in turn chartered her to the British government to transport convicts to Australia.

Under the command of George Bowen, master, she departed Portsmouth on 27 March 1791 as part of the third fleet. By 9 April Albemarle had separated from the other vessels of the Portsmouth group. Some convicts then attempted to capture her, but the guards and the ship's company quickly suppressed the uprising. Captain Bowen hanged the two convicts that appeared to be the ringleaders. The remaining recaptured convicts revealed that two sailors had instigated the uprising and Bowen had the two restrained until he could land them at Madeira where a British warship collected them and took them back to England.

On 13 October 1791 Albemarle arrived in Port Jackson, New South Wales. She had embarked 282 male convicts, 32 of whom died during the voyage; two of these were the men executed for the mutiny. An additional six female convicts, of uncertain origin, were found on board upon arrival. Albemarle left Port Jackson on 3 December 1791, in company with Active, bound for India.

The EIC had instructed the masters of Albemarle, Active, Admiral Barrington, and Queen to sail to India after disembarking their convicts. It had also provided them with money with which to purchase cargoes on behalf of the company for carriage back to England.

== Fate ==
Albemarle left Bombay on 23 December 1792, again in company with Active. The French privateer Duguay-Trouin captured Albemarle in May 1793 and took her into Morlaix, France. A contemporary report in Lloyd's List reports Albemarle as having come from Bombay, and her captor taking her into France. The same issue has a separate report of a privateer having taken Active and having sent her into Brest. A report from three weeks later has Albemarle being taken into Morlaix.
