= HM hired armed cutter Dart =

History

United Kingdom
- Name: HMS Dart
- In service: 15 June 1803
- Out of service: 10 January 1805

General characteristics
- Tons burthen: 5583/94 (bm)
- Sail plan: Cutter
- Complement: 21
- Armament: 6 × 3-pounder guns

HM hired armed cutter Dart was a hired armed vessel that served the Royal Navy between 15 June 1803 and 10 January 1805.

Dart was under the command of Lieutenant Norton on 3 July when she arrived at Torbay, together with he hired cutter Venus. Their role was to be to escort the Torbay fishing vessels. Still, on 6 September 1803 Dart brought into Dartmouth the smuggling cutter Dart and the smuggling lugger Clenk with 220 and 62 casks of foreign spirits.

Ann was sailing from Teignmouth to Shields when a French privateer of 14 guns captured her. Dart recaptured Ann, which arrived at Dartmouth on 2 June 1804. Dart fired on the privateer, which had a crew of 60 men, but declined the opportunity to engage Dart.

Dart detained St Andre, Salvo, master, which was sailing from Cadiz to Dieppe. St Andre arrived at Dartmouth on 10 July.

On 11 September Dart brought into Dartmouth the smuggling lugger Hope, of Beer, with 130 casks of spirits and some tobacco.
