= HMS Dart (1803) =

History

Great Britain
- Name: Dart
- Launched: 1796
- Captured: December 1798

France
- Name: Dart (or Dard)
- Acquired: 1798 by capture
- Captured: 29 June 1803

United Kingdom
- Acquired: 1803 by purchase of a prize
- Fate: Sold March 1808

General characteristics
- Displacement: 120 tons (French)
- Tons burthen: 81 (bm)
- Armament: French Navy: 6 × 4 or 2-pounder guns; Royal Navy: 8 guns

HMS Dart was an 8-gun lugger, reportedly previously the British privateer Dart, built in 1796, captured by the French in 1798, recaptured from the French in 1803, and sold in 1808.

== Career ==
French records refer to her as the lugger Dart (or Dard), and state that she was a former British privateer named Dart, captured when she grounded at Calais in 1798. (Note: There is no record of a privateer or letter of marque of that name and her description. There was a merchantman Dart, Eales, master, that had been sailing from Leith to Leghorn when she was reported in December 1798 to have been lost at Calais. Unfortunately, Dart, Eales, master, does not appear in the volume of Lloyd's List for 1797.)

The French refloated her and placed Dart in service in January 1799.

In 1802, after the Treaty of Amiens, she was under the command of enseigne de vaisseau Fayolle when she transported troops from Dunkirk to re-occupy the island of Gorée.

On 29 June 1803, HMS Apollo captured in the Bay of Biscay the French navy brig Dart, which was sailing from Martinique to Lorient. She was armed with four guns and had a 45-man crew. She and several other vessels had been carrying cargo to Martinique. She was under the command of lieutenant de vaisseau Fayolle. Apollo sent Dart into Portsmouth.

The Royal Navy took her into service as HMS Dart. (Note: The maintenance of the name is anomalous as there was already a sloop named Dart in service, as well as a hired armed cutter named Dart. To avoid ambiguity and confusion the Royal Navy generally avoided having two vessels with the same name in service at the same time.)

There is no record of her being commissioned or in service, which suggests that she may never actually have served before she was sold.

== Fate ==
The "Principal Officers and Commissioners of His Majesty's Navy" on 18 March 1808 offered for sale "The Hull of His Majesty's Lugger Dart, lying in Hamoaze". She sold that month.
