= Princess of Wales (1795 ship) =

History

Great Britain
- Name: Princess of Wales
- Namesake: Caroline of Brunswick, Princess of Wales
- Owner: 1795:R. Webster & Co.; 1799:W. Vaughan; 1825:Pope
- Builder: Thomas Haw, Stockton
- Launched: 20 April 1795
- Fate: Probably foundered 1828; last listed 1830

General characteristics
- Tons burthen: 405, 406, or 408, or 434, (bm)
- Length: Overall:109 ft 6 in (33.4 m); Keel:87 ft 1 in (26.5 m)
- Beam: 29 ft 7 in (9.0 m)
- Depth of hold: 13 ft 9 in (4.2 m)
- Complement: 1795:40; 1798:40
- Armament: 1795:10 × 6-pounder guns; 1798:12 × 18&9-pounder cannons
- Notes: Two decks

Princess of Wales was launched at Stockton in 1795. She made three voyages as an "Extra ship", i.e., under charter, for the British East India Company (EIC). On her return she became a West Indiaman. A privateer captured her in 1803 as she was coming back to England from Jamaica, but British privateers immediately recaptured her. She continued sailing to Jamaica though later, under a new owner, she traded more widely. She probably foundered in 1828, and is last listed in 1830.

== Career ==
Princess of Wales entered Lloyd's Register in 1795 with R. Mash, master, R. Webster, owner, and trade London–India. The next volume of Lloyd's Register showed her master as R. Mash, and her trade as London–Bengal. The EIC had her measured and inspected in 1795. [Mash was born in Yarmouth, Norfolk in 1757 and died in 1803 in Mitcham, Surrey.]

=== EIC voyage #1 (1795-1796) ===
Captain Robert Abbon Mash acquired a letter of marque on 12 June 1795. (Earlier he had commanded Admiral Barrington.) He sailed from The Downs on 8 July 1795, bound for Bengal. Princess of Wales arrived at Culpee on 8 November. She was at Calcutta on 1 December. Homeward bound, Kedgeree on 7 February 1796. She was at the Cape of Good Hope on 12 April, reached St Helena on 5 May, and arrived at The Downs on 3 August.

=== EIC voyage #2 (1796-1797) ===
Captain Mash sailed from The Downs on 16 October 1796, bound for Madras. Princess of Wales arrived at Madras on 11 February 1797. Homeward bound, she was at Trincomalee on 13 April, and Simon's Bay on 13 July. She reached St Helena on 11 September, and arrived at The Downs on 14 December.

=== EIC voyage #3 (1799) ===
Captain Gilbert Mitchell acquired a letter of marque on 2 April 1798. He sailed Princess of Wales to Madras on 31 May. She left Madras on 1 March 1799, and was at the Cape on 30 April and St Helena on 21 May. She was off Beachy Head on 26 July. She returned to her moorings on 30 July.

=== Later career ===
Princess of Wales then appears to have become a West Indiaman, sailing to Jamaica. Lloyd's List reported on 12 July 1803, that a French privateer had captured Princess of Wales, Griegg, master, as she was sailing from Jamaica to London. However, the British privateers Lord Nelson and Trimmer had retaken her and sent her into Plymouth. The French privateer Malwan or Malouin, of four guns, out from Saint-Malo 15 days, had captured her on 2 July. The two British privateers recaptured her on 6 July. Princess of Wales was carrying a valuable cargo of 580 hogsheads of sugar and 150 logs. Princess of Wales had only two guns, and the French prize master had only 10 men to man them and sail her, but he fought for eight hours before striking. (Note: Lord Nelson was a schooner of 69 tons (bm), whose master, William Crowe, received a letter of marque on 27 May 1803. She had a crew of 40 men and was armed with eight 3&4-pounder guns and two swivel guns. Trimmer, of Portsmouth, was armed with two or four 4-pounder guns and eight swivels. She had a crew of 20 men under the command of Henry Haskell, who had received a letter of marque on 8 June 1803.) Captain Gregg was surprised to discover Princess of Wales in the Catwater; he had assumed that her captor had taken her to France. He had been a prisoner on Malouin, and had come into Plymouth on 16 July when the privateer brig Speedwell had captured Malouin a few days earlier and brought her into Plymouth. (Note: Speedwell, of London, "Cromer, John L.", master, was of 152 tons (bm). She was armed with twelve 4-pounder guns and had a crew of 30 men. Her letter of marque was dated 1 June 1803.) (Note: Princess of Wales was said to be worth £36,000. Lord Nelson and Trimmer would have been entitled to a portion of the value as marine salvage.)

On 23 November 1809 Princess of Wales, M'Kinley, master, was sailing for Jamaica when she ran down and sank Thomas & Hannah, Holman, master, which was sailing from Exeter to London. The crew was saved. (Note: Thomas & Hannah was of 41 tons (bm), French, and built in 1802. Her owner was Payne. Her entry in the Register of Shipping is marked "LOST".)

Later, Princess of Wales sailed to Quebec and Sierra Leone, and perhaps elsewhere.

Year	Master	Owner	Trade	Source
1799	Mitchell; James Grigg	R. Webster; W. Vaughan	London–Cape of Good Hope	Lloyd's Register (LR)
1800	J. Grieg	Vaughan	London-Jamaica	Register of Shipping (RS)
1805	J. Swan	Vaughan	London-Jamaica	RS
1810	M'Kinley	Vaughan	London-Jamaica	RS
1815	W.Syme	Vaughan	London-Jamaica "C."–London	RS; Good repair in 1812
1816	J.Syms	Vaughan	London–Jamaica	LR; thorough repair 1812

On 23 March 1817 Princess of Wales, Syms, master, arrived at Montego Bay. She was 28 days from Bath, Massachusetts. (Note: Maine was a part of the Commonwealth of Massachusetts until Maine seceded in 1820.) When she was on the SE end of San Domingo, the Venezuelan privateer schooner Alvida Duanda, John Peat, master, boarded her. Peat explained that he was part of a squadron under Admiral Brion, who had sailed on an expedition to capture Margarita Island. Alvida Duanda had earlier that day captured a Spanish schooner, whose master was now aboard the privateer. Peat and his crew treated Syms and his crew civilly and took nothing from them.

A Princess of Wales was reported lost in a snowstorm on 5 February 1818 on Seguin's Ledge as she was sailing from Jamaica to Bath. Seven of her crew drowned. However, on 15 August 1818 Princess of Wales, Syms, master, sailing from London to Bath to Jamaica was reported to have been at 43°10′N 53°30′W.

Year	Master	Owner	Trade	Source
1818	W.Syme	Vaughan	London-Jamaica	LR; thorough repair 1812
1820	W.Syme	Vaughan	London-Jamaica	RS
1825	Leatherby	Pope	Plymouth-Quebec	RS; damage repaired 1823
1830	Clymo	Pope	Plymouth–Sierra Leone	RS; large repair 1828

== Fate ==
Princess of Wales is last listed in both Lloyd's Register and the Register of Shipping in 1830. Lloyd's List for 9 June 1829 reported that Princess of Wales, Clyme, master, had been missing since 27 November 1828.
