= Diligence (1800 ship) =

British slave ship (1800–1804)

History

Great Britain
- Name: Diligent
- Launched: 1795, Spain
- Acquired: 1800, by purchase of a prize
- Fate: Wrecked October 1804

General characteristics
- Tons burthen: 378 (bm)
- Complement: 1801: 20; 1803: 30; 1804: 35
- Armament: 1801: 14 × 6-pounder guns; 1803: 16 × 6&9-pounder guns; 1804: 20 × 6&9-pounder guns

Diligence or Diligent was launched in Spain in 1795 and came into British ownership as a French prize acquired in 1800. She became a slave ship in the triangular trade in enslaved people. She made three complete voyages transporting captives. During her third voyage she captured three French vessels. She was wrecked in 1804 on her fourth journey before she had embarked any slaves.

== Origin and name ==
Diligence first appeared in Lloyd's Register (LR), and the Register of Shipping (RS), in 1802. Both agreed on the master, owner and trade. However, Lloyd's Register showed her origin as Spain and her launch year as 1795, whereas the Register of Shipping described her as a French prize taken in 1800.

Year	Master	Owner	Trade	Source
1802	Marshall	Hinde & Co.	Liverpool–Africa	LR & RS

Although the registers used the name Diligence, the Trans-Atlantic Slave Trade database uses the name Diligent, as do most press reports, particularly Lloyd's List.

== Career ==
1st voyage transporting enslaved people (1801–1802): Captain David Marshall acquired a letter of marque on 2 July 1801. He sailed from Liverpool on 25 July. In 1801, 147 vessels sailed from British ports on voyages to transport enslaved people; 122 of these vessels sailed from Liverpool.

Diligent acquired captives at Bonny Island and sailed from there in company with Molly and some other slave ships. Diligence arrived at St Vincent on 1 January 1802. She arrived back at Liverpool 16 March 1802. She had left Liverpool with 43 crew members and had suffered two crew deaths on her voyage.

2nd voyage transporting enslaved people (1802–1803): Captain Marshall sailed from Liverpool on 18 August 1802. In 1802, 155 vessels sailed from British ports on voyages to transport enslaved people; 122 of these vessels sailed from Liverpool.

Diligent acquired captives at Bonny and arrived at St Vincent with 329 captives. Diligent arrived back at Liverpool on 3 April 1803. She had left Liverpool with 34 crew members and had suffered two crew deaths on her voyage.

After the resumption of war with France, Captain David Marshall acquired a letter of marque on 23 May 1803.

3rd voyage transporting enslaved people (1803–1804): Captain Marshall sailed from Liverpool on 18 June 1803. In 1803, 99 vessels sailed from British ports on voyages to transport enslaved people; 83 of these vessels sailed from Liverpool.

In December 1803, Lloyds List reported that Diligent, Marshall, had captured two Dutch Guineamen, and carried them into Bonny. In January 1804, Lloyd's List reported that Aimable Julie, prize to Diligent, Marshall, master, had arrived at Barbados. Then Lloyd's List reported that Deux Amis, prize to Diligent, Marshall, master, had wrecked on the Bonny Bar. However, Diligent and Oliviere had rescued the crew and slaves and taken them to Barbados. Oliviere too was a prize to Diligent, Marshall, master. (Note: Olivier, of 176 tons, had been built at Nantes in 1802 by M. Mosneron-Dupin. She had a crew of 23 men and two boys, under the command of Captain Joseph-François Leglé. Oliver had sailed from Nantes on 6 March 1803 bound for the Gold Coast. On 6 August 1803 Diligent captured Olivier at Juda. After Diligent captured Oliver, Marshall appointed William Jordan prize master. The entry for Olivier in the Trans Atlantic Slave Trade database is unaware of her capture. It also mistakes her second captain and supercargo Charles-Coustant Bertrand for her captain. Deux Amis, of 380 or 395 tons, left Marseilles on 22 October 1802. She had a crew of 42 men under the command of captain Jean-Joseph Durbec. She stopped at Lisbon on 7 December, and on 18 February 1803 arrived at Fort Cormatin. Because the availability of captives was poor, Durbec sailed on to Juda, arriving there on the 20th. On 10 August 1803, i.e., four days after the capture of Oliver, Diligent captured Deux Amis. The entry for Deux Amis in the Trans-Atlantic Slave Trade database has minimal information and is unaware of her capture, assuming that she delivered her slaves to Martinique. Aimable Julie, Charles Rosse, master, was a schooner, from Lorient. The droits of Admiralty for Aimable Juliet, proceeds brought in on 8 February 1804, amounted to £173 12s 3d.)

Diligent arrived at Demerara on 17 December 1803 with 329 captives. She sailed for Liverpool on 16 March 1804 and arrived there on 2 May. She had left Liverpool with 50 crew members and had suffered four crew deaths on her voyage. She returned with a cargo of sugar, coffee, cotton, and six elephant teeth (ivory tusks).

4th voyage transporting enslaved people (1804–loss): Captain John Preston acquired a letter of marque on 13 July 1804. He sailed from Liverpool on 6 August. In 1803, 99 vessels sailed from British ports on voyages to transport enslaved people; 83 of these vessels sailed from Liverpool.

== Fate ==
Diligent was lost on 3 October 1804 going into Bonny, Nigeria. She was on a voyage from Liverpool to Bonny. (Note: One source incorrectly gives the year as 1805.) (Note: Captain John Preston died on 29 April 1807, while master of Triton.)

In 1804, 30 British slave ships were lost; eight were lost on the African coast. Still, during the period 1793 to 1807, war, rather than maritime hazards, as in the case of Diligent, or resistance by the captives, was the greatest cause of vessel losses among British enslaving vessels.
