= HMS Apollo (1799) =

Frigate of the Royal Navy

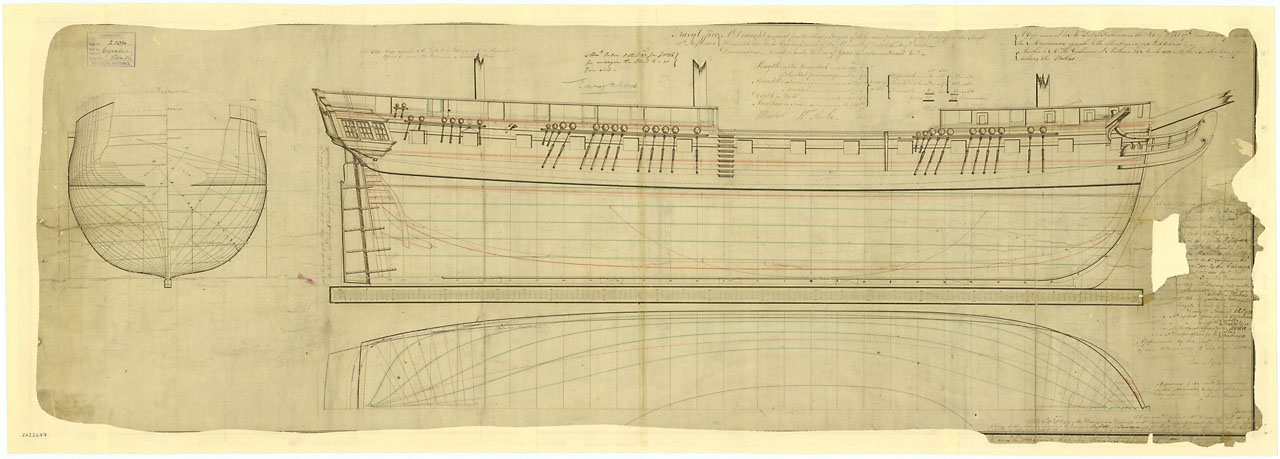
- Plan of Apollo-class frigate, dated 1803

History

United Kingdom
- Name: Apollo
- Ordered: 15 September 1798
- Builder: Dudman, Deptford Wharf
- Laid down: November 1798
- Launched: 16 August 1799
- Fate: Wrecked, 2 April 1804

General characteristics
- Class & type: Apollo-class frigate
- Tons burthen: 956 17/94 (bm)
- Length: 145 ft (44 m) (gundeck); 122 ft 4 in (37.29 m) (keel)
- Beam: 38 ft 4 in (11.68 m)
- Depth of hold: 13 ft 3 in (4.04 m)
- Sail plan: Full-rigged ship
- Complement: 264
- Armament: UD: 26 × 18-pounder guns; QD: 2 × 9-pounder guns + 10 × 32-pounder carronades; Fc: 2 × 9-pounder guns + 4 × 32-pounder carronades

HMS Apollo, the fourth ship of the Royal Navy to be named for the Greek god Apollo, was a fifth-rate frigate of a nominal 36 guns. She was the name ship of the Apollo-class frigates. Apollo was launched in 1799, and wrecked with heavy loss of life in 1804.

== French Revolutionary Wars ==
Apollo was built at Deptford Wharf in 1799, taking her name from the fifth-rate Apollo, which had been wrecked off Holland in January. She was commissioned in October under Captain Peter Halkett – who had commanded the previous Apollo when she was lost – and was posted to the West Indies, cruising there and escorting convoys to Britain.

While she was escorting a convoy on 11 January 1800 Apollo saw a suspicious vessel some distance away. After a four-hour chase she captured the Spanish warship Aquilla. Aquilla was pierced for 22 guns on the main deck but had only four mounted. She was under the command of Don Mariano Merino and was on a cargo voyage from Buenos Ayres to A Coruña. At the time, the sloop Hornet was in company with Apollo.

At daybreak on 15 January, Apollo sighted a vessel that proceeded to attempt to evade closer scrutiny. After a short chase Apollo recaptured Lady Harewood, which had been part of the convoy that Apollo was escorting, but which had gotten separated on 1 January at the onset of gale. On 13 January the French privateer ship Vautour, of 20 guns, had captured her.

Apollo captured Cantabria (or Cántabro), of 18 guns, off Havana on 27 January. In at least one account the vessel is described as the "Cantabrian Spanish ship of 18 guns".

Between 20 May and 19 September, Apollo captured two vessels: She was reportedly under command of Capt. Ellicott on 4 August, 1800 when she made contact with USS Ganges.

- Spanish warship of 18 guns and 110 men, with "a valuable cargo"; (Note: This may well be the same vessel as Cantabbria captured on 27 January, given the vagaries of record keeping at the time.) and a
- Spanish xebec sailing from Málaga to Vera Cruz.

On 10 November, Apollo chased a xebec and then, coming up on a brig, chased and captured her. The brig was Resolution, a sloop of war, of 18 guns and 149 men, under the command of Don Francisco Oarrichena. She was the former British navy cutter Resolution and had sailed from Vera Cruz three days earlier. After securing the prize, Apollo set out after the xebec, sighting her an hour after daybreak. Apollo finally captured the xebec Marte, of 75 tons, at three in the afternoon. She had been sailing from Vera Cruz for Havana. Apollo towed Resolution until 27 November, when she lost her mast. Resolution was in such an irreparable state Halkett destroyed her. Then on 7 December Apollo captured the schooner St Joseph, of 70 tons.

In addition to these three vessels, between 3 August 1800 and 3 January 1801, Apollo captured two other Spanish merchant vessels:

- brig Santa Trinidad, of 140 tons, carrying dry goods;
- polacre V. Del Carmen, of 100 tons, carrying dry goods.

On 18 February 1801, Apollo captured the French 14-gun privateer Vigilante.

Head money for Aquilla, Cantabria and Vigilante was paid in August 1828. (Note: First-class shares were worth £77 18s 3d (Aquilla), £163 18s 5 3/4d (Cantabria), and £61 18s 6d (Vigilante); fifth-class shares, the shares of an able seaman, were worth 4s 8d, 9s 10 1/2d and 4s 0 1/2d.)

In mid-July 1801, Apollo picked up the crew of Meleager from Vera Cruz. Meleager had wrecked on the Triangles Shoals in the Bay of Campeche on 9 June but the crew had been able to take to the boats in time and sail to Vera Cruz.

Apollo returned to Portsmouth in March 1802, to be paid off after the Peace of Amiens. However, she was rushed into commission again in October of that year, for service on the Irish station under Captain John William Taylor Dixon.

== Napoleonic Wars ==
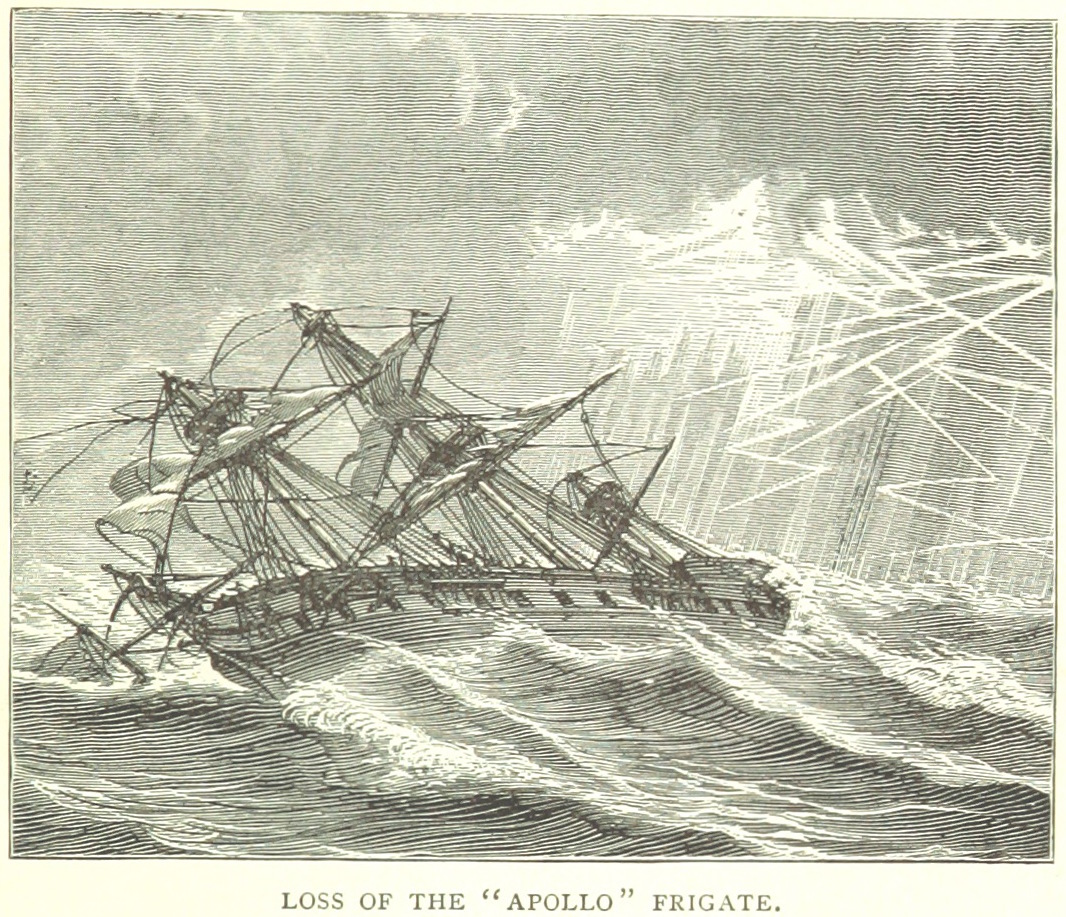
Apollo wrecked on 2 April 1804

On 21 June 1803, Apollo captured the French ship Bon Accord. Then on 29 June, Apollo captured the French navy brig Dart, which sailing from Martinique to Lorient. She was armed with four guns and had a 45-man crew. She and several other vessels had been carrying cargo to Martinique. The Royal Navy took her into service as HMS Dart. (Note: French records refer to her as the lugger Dard and state that she was a former British privateer named Dart captured when she grounded at Calais in 1798. However, there is no record of a privateer of that name.)

In July 1803 Lloyd's List reported that the frigate HMS Apollo had captured Demerara Packet, but that the French privateer Malouin had re-captured her. Then HMS Isis re-captured Demerara Packet.

=== Fate ===
On 27 March 1804, Apollo, under Captain John Dixon, sailed from Cork with a convoy of sixty-seven merchantmen, accompanied by HMS Carysfort. The convoy departed in strong gales but made good progress until 30 March when the wind backed westerly, forcing the ship and the convoy to steer south-east. The convoy estimated by dead reckoning that it was well out into the Atlantic, south-west of the Scilly Isles. However, at 03:00 in the morning of 2 April, Apollo unexpectedly ran aground on a shoal. In the morning Apollo discovered that she had run aground about nine miles south of Cape Mondego on the coast of Portugal. Twenty-five or six of the vessels in the convoy, traveling closely behind due to the low visibility and bad weather, were also wrecked. Next day some more vessels wrecked. In all, 29 vessels ran aground.

The six boats of the frigate were destroyed, and many of her complement were swept off and drowned. The rough seas meant it took two days to transfer Apollo's surviving crew to land. Sixty-two officers and men died; (Note: A list of the drowned was published in The Times of 2 May 1804. It included Captain Dixon, and one of his lieutenants.) around twenty of the crew died in the first few hours, but most perished of exposure waiting to be rescued. Some men died on shore from drinking spirits.

The number of dead in the merchant vessels is not known, but the Naval Chronicle reported that "dead bodies were every day floating ashore, and pieces of wreck covered the beach upwards of ten miles". Some vessels had lost their entire crews; others had lost from two to 12 men each. Carysfort had shifted course on the evening of 1 April, and so escaped grounding. She gathered the 38 surviving vessels and proceeded with the convoy.

Some of the survivors from Apollo had to walk 18 miles to Figuera. From there a schooner carried them to Lisbon. HMS Orpheus brought them back to Portsmouth.

At the time, accounts blamed strong currents. Other accounts blamed the carelessness of the Commodore. Later it was discovered that Apollo had taken on board an iron tank, but that no one had adjusted her compass for the influence of this large magnetic mass. Consequently, a small error in direction accumulated over the course of the five days; at the time Apollo struck Dixon thought she was forty or so miles out to sea. Because the convoy had endured bad weather since leaving Cork, no one had taken sightings that would have enabled them to correct their estimates of their position. Instead, they had relied on an approximately known speed and a biased heading for their estimate.

After the incident, the First Lord Henry Dundas, 1st Viscount Melville commissioned an investigative confidential report on the loss of the Apollo and the 27 merchantmen and on the sufficiency of shipbuilding timber in British ship construction.
