= HMS Dart (1810) =

Cutter of the Royal Navy

History

United Kingdom
- Name: HMS Dart
- Acquired: 1810 by purchase
- Fate: Foundered 1813

General characteristics
- Tons burthen: 127 (bm)
- Length: 62 ft 7 in (19.1 m)
- Beam: 22 ft 5 in (6.8 m)
- Depth of hold: 10 ft 1 in (3.1 m)
- Armament: 10 × 12-pounder carronades

HMS Dart was a mercantile cutter that the Royal Navy purchased on the stocks in 1810. She spent her career carrying dispatches and mails. She foundered without a trace in 1813.

== Career ==
The Royal Navy purchased Belerina or Ballerina in 1809 as she was being built at Mevagissey. It registered her on 10 March 1810 and commissioned her under Lieutenant Thomas Allen.

Dart's role was to carry mail and dispatches. On 25 October 1810 she sailed from Falmouth with mails for Cadiz and Malta. On 30 December 1811 she sailed from Tarifa with dispatches from Captain Edward Dickson on HMS Stately

On 10 May 1812 she was at Plymouth with dispatches from the Mediterranean and Gibraltar. On 1 August she was reported to have sailed Falmouth for the West Indies with dispatches. The next day she was reported to have sailed from Falmouth for Gibraltar and Malta. On 30 December she sailed from Tarifa with dispatches from Captain Edward Dickson on HMS Stately

On 5 May 1813 Dart put into Rio de Janeiro with her mast and bowsprit sprung. She had encountered a gust of wind in the River Plate. On 1 July she sailed from Rio de Janeiro for England as one of the escorts to a convoy.

On 7 October 1813 Dart arrived at Rio de Janeiro from London and Lisbon.

== Fate ==
Dart and Lieutenant Allen sailed from Halifax, Nova Scotia on 27 October 1813. She was not seen again. It was presumed that she had foundered with all hands. Other reports state that Dart was lost after she sailed from Pernambuco on 20 October, bound for England.
