= Third Fleet (Australia) =

1791 prisoner transport convoy to Australia

The Third Fleet comprised 11 ships that set sail from the Kingdom of Great Britain in February, March and April 1791, bound for the Sydney penal settlement, with more than 2,000 convicts aboard. The passengers comprised convicts, military personnel and notable people sent to fill high positions in the colony. More important for the fledgling colony was that the ships also carried provisions.

The first ship to arrive in Sydney was the Mary Ann with its cargo of female convicts and provisions on 9 July 1791. Mary Ann had sailed on her own to Sydney Cove, and there is some argument about whether she was the last ship of the Second Fleet, or the first ship of the Third Fleet, or simply sailing independently, as was HMS Gorgon. The vessels that unambiguously belong to the third fleet all left together.

The ships that make up each fleet, however, are decided from the viewpoint of the settlers in Sydney Cove. For them, the second set of ships arrived in 1790 (June), and the third set of ships arrived in 1791 (July–October). The Mary Ann was a 1791 arrival.

The next ship to arrive just over three weeks later, on 1 August 1791, was Matilda. With Matilda came news that there were another nine ships making their way for Sydney, and which were expected to arrive shortly. The final vessel, Admiral Barrington, did not arrive until 16 October, nearly 11 weeks after Matilda, and 14 weeks after Mary Ann.

== Ships of the Third Fleet ==
Ship	Master	Dep. England	Arr. Sydney	Duration	Male convicts: arrived [deaths] (boarded)	Female convicts: arrived [deaths] (boarded)
Mary Ann	Mark Munro	16 Feb 1791	9 Jul 1791	143 days		141 [9] (150)
HMS Gorgon	Commander John Parker, RN	15 Mar 1791	21 Sep 1791	190 days	30 [1] (31)	
Matilda	Matthew Weatherhead	27 Mar 1791	1 Aug 1791	127 days	225 [25] (250)	
Atlantic	Archibald Armstrong	27 Mar 1791	20 Aug 1791	147 days	202 [18] (220)	
Salamander	John Nichol	27 Mar 1791	21 Aug 1791	148 days	155 [5] (160)	
William and Ann	Eber Bunker	27 Mar 1791	28 Aug 1791	154 days	181 [7] (188)	
Active	John Mitchinson	27 Mar 1791	26 Sep 1791	183 days	154 [21] (175)	
Queen (came from Cork, Ireland)	Richard Bowen	19 Apr 1791	26 Sep 1791	160 days	126 [7] (133)	22 [-] (22)
Albemarle	George Bowen	27 Mar 1791	13 Oct 1791	200 days	250 [32] (282)	6 [-] (6) (arrival of females is a mystery)
Britannia	Thomas Melvill	27 Mar 1791	14 Oct 1791	201 days	129 [21] (150)	
Admiral Barrington	Robert Abbon Marsh	27 Mar 1791	16 Oct 1791	203 days	264 [36] (300)	
TOTAL					1716 [173] (1889)	169 [9] (178)

Atlantic, Salamander, and William and Ann departed from Plymouth; their naval agent was Lieutenant Richard Bowen. Albemarle, Active, Admiral Barrington, Britannia, and Matilda departed from Portsmouth; their naval agent was Lieutenant Robert Parry Young. Queen departed from Cork, Ireland; she had her own naval agent, Lieutenant Samuel Blow.

After having delivered their convicts, Active, Admiral Barrington, Albemarle, and Queen sailed for India. French privateers captured Active and Albemarle as they were almost home. Pirates murdered most of Admiral Barrington's crew near Bombay, but she was apparently recovered. A French privateer captured her in 1797.

Britannia, Mary Ann, Matilda, Salamander, and William and Ann went whaling. Britannia was wrecked off the coast of New South Wales some years later, in 1806. Matilda was wrecked on a shoal in February 1792.

== People of the Third Fleet ==
From the above table it can be seen that 173 male convicts and 9 female convicts died during this voyage. Though this death rate was high, it was nowhere near as high as that which occurred on the Second Fleet. Convict arrivals on the Third Fleet included:

- Simeon Lord, pioneer merchant and magistrate
- Isaac Nichols, first postmaster (1810)
- Joseph Luker, police officer
- James Underwood, shipbuilder

== See also ==
- First Fleet
- Fourth Fleet
- Penal transportation

== External sources ==
- Bateson, Charles, The Convict Ships, 1787-1868, Sydney, 1974. ISBN 0-85174-195-9
- Hughes, Robert, The Fatal Shore, London, Pan, 1988 ISBN 0-394-75366-6
- Keneally, Thomas (2006), A Commonwealth of Thieves, Sydney, Random House, ISBN 978-1-74166-121-7
