= William Camden (merchant) =

- Born: 1730s
- Died: 1796
- Occupations: Slave trader and merchant
- Known for: Sugar refining
- Board member of: Camden, Calvert and King

William Camden (1730s – 1796) was an English merchant who was a partner in the slave-trading partnership of Camden, Calvert and King. He was also in partnership with his brother, John Camden, in the family sugar-refining business, and had business connections with prominent German and Huguenot families in east London.

== Early life and family ==
William Camden was born in the 1730s, the son of John Camden, a sugar refiner. He had a brother, also John. The family were landowners in Oxfordshire.

== Career ==
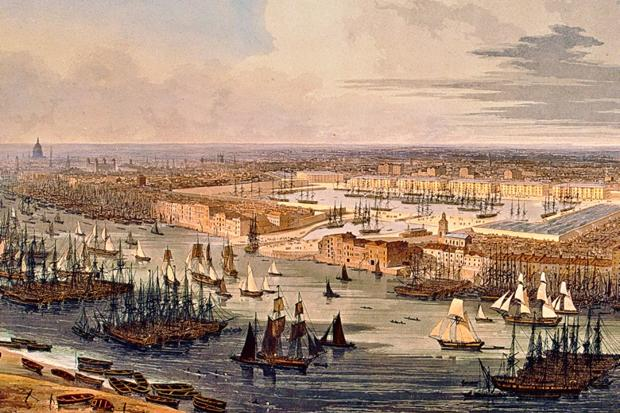
Wapping, 1803

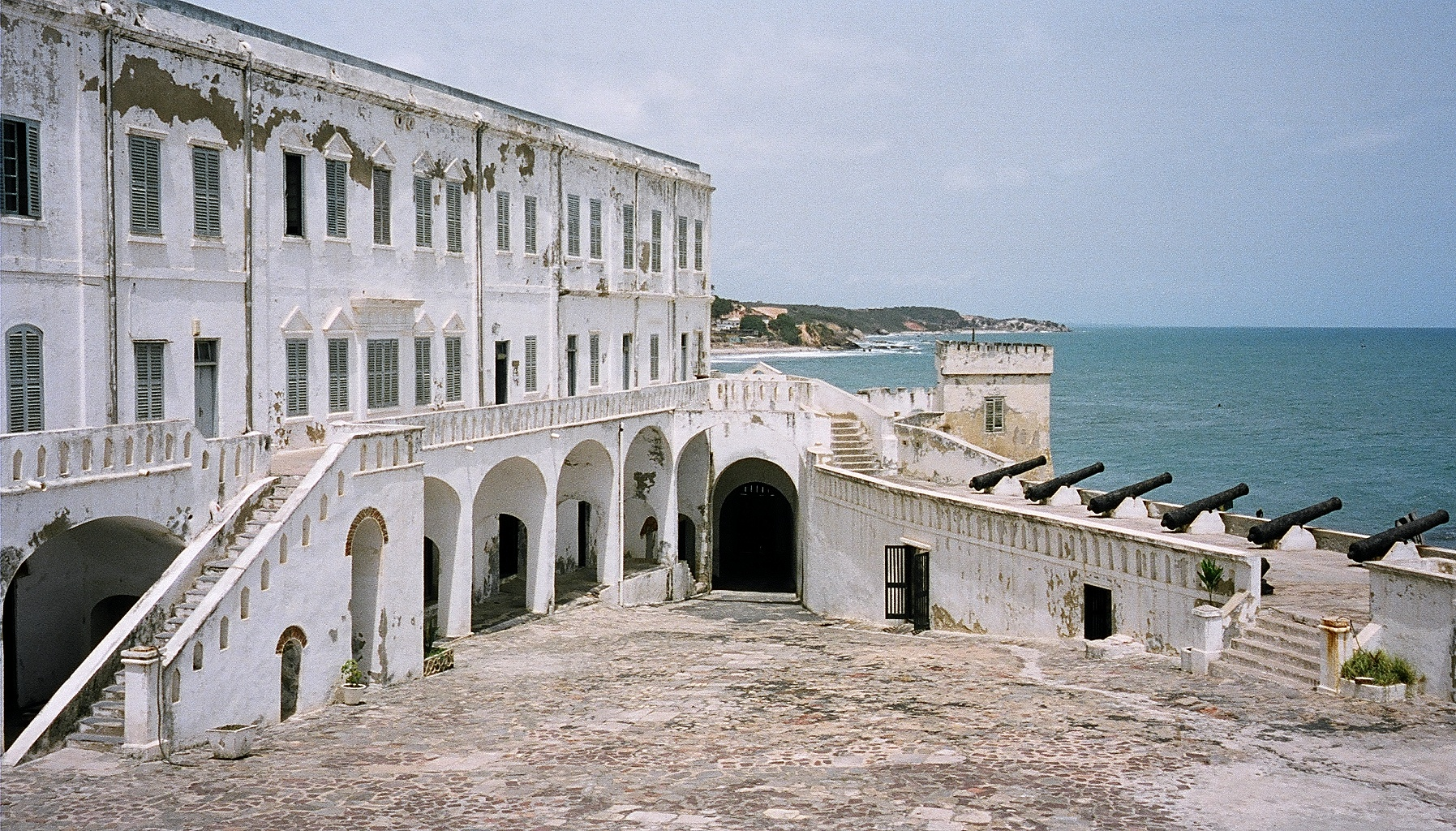
Cape Coast Castle seen in 2005

Camden entered the family business of sugar refining and was in partnership with his brother, John Camden. During Camden's lifetime, the business was based in Wapping, in east London, where it was linked to the German sugarbaking businesses in the area. Camden also had business connections with French Huguenots in London and was in partnership with George Lear and Peter Thellusson (also a Bank of England director) as sugar refiners. In addition, he became closely associated with Joseph Curtis (1715–1771), who made ship's biscuits, an essential part of sailors' diet, and did work for the British government.

From the 1760s, Camden was the owner with Anthony Calvert of ships involved in the slave trade between West Africa and the Caribbean. He probably also met Thomas King at this time when King was master on ships owned by Camden and Calvert. The three men first partnered as Camden, Calvert and King for the 1773 voyage of the Three Good Friends to St Vincent via Cape Coast Castle in 1773.

Ships of the firm transported thousands of enslaved persons from West Africa, mostly to the Caribbean, in the late 18th century. Their activities also included supplying British dockyards and overseas garrisons, whaling, and trading in commodities from the East Indies. In the 1780s they began to transport criminals from Britain to Australia.

Camden retired in 1783 and the business was transferred from 12 Red Lion Street, Wapping, to Calvert's residence at 3 The Crescent, Minories, Tower Hill.

== Death ==
William Camden died in 1796 but the firm continued under the same name until Anthony Calvert died in 1809. Camden left legacies totalling around £6,000 and the majority of the rest of his estate to Mary Anne Camden.
