= Thomas King (slave trader) =

- Born: c. 1740
- Died: c. 1824 (aged 83–84)
- Occupations: Slave trader and merchant
- Board member of: Camden, Calvert and King
- Spouse: Sarah
- Children: 6
- Parent: Newark King

Thomas King (c. 1740 – c. 1824) was a British slave-trader and partner in the firm of Camden, Calvert and King. His early career was at sea in a variety of vessels involved in the slave trade in the Caribbean and West Africa in the 1760s. He probably met his future business partners Anthony Calvert (1735–1809) and William Camden at this time when he was master on ships owned by them. He first partnered with them as Camden, Calvert and King for the voyage of the Three Good Friends to Saint Vincent in 1773 and the firm subsequently made many slaving and trading voyages in which they transported at least 22,000 enslaved persons, mostly from West Africa to the Caribbean.

In 1776 he was tried for murder at the Old Bailey in London but acquitted. He was a governor of the Foundling Hospital in London, elected to the Elder Brethren of Trinity House, and one of the founder subscribers of Lloyd's of London. King acquired significant wealth and owned a number of estates in British Guiana (now Guyana). He left an estate of £120,000 in 1824.

== Early life and family ==
The year of King's birth is unknown. His father was Newark King and his family had connections with the East Riding of Yorkshire. He married Sarah and had children Sarah Amelia, William King, Anthony Calvert, Thomas Harper, Henry, and George.

== Early career ==
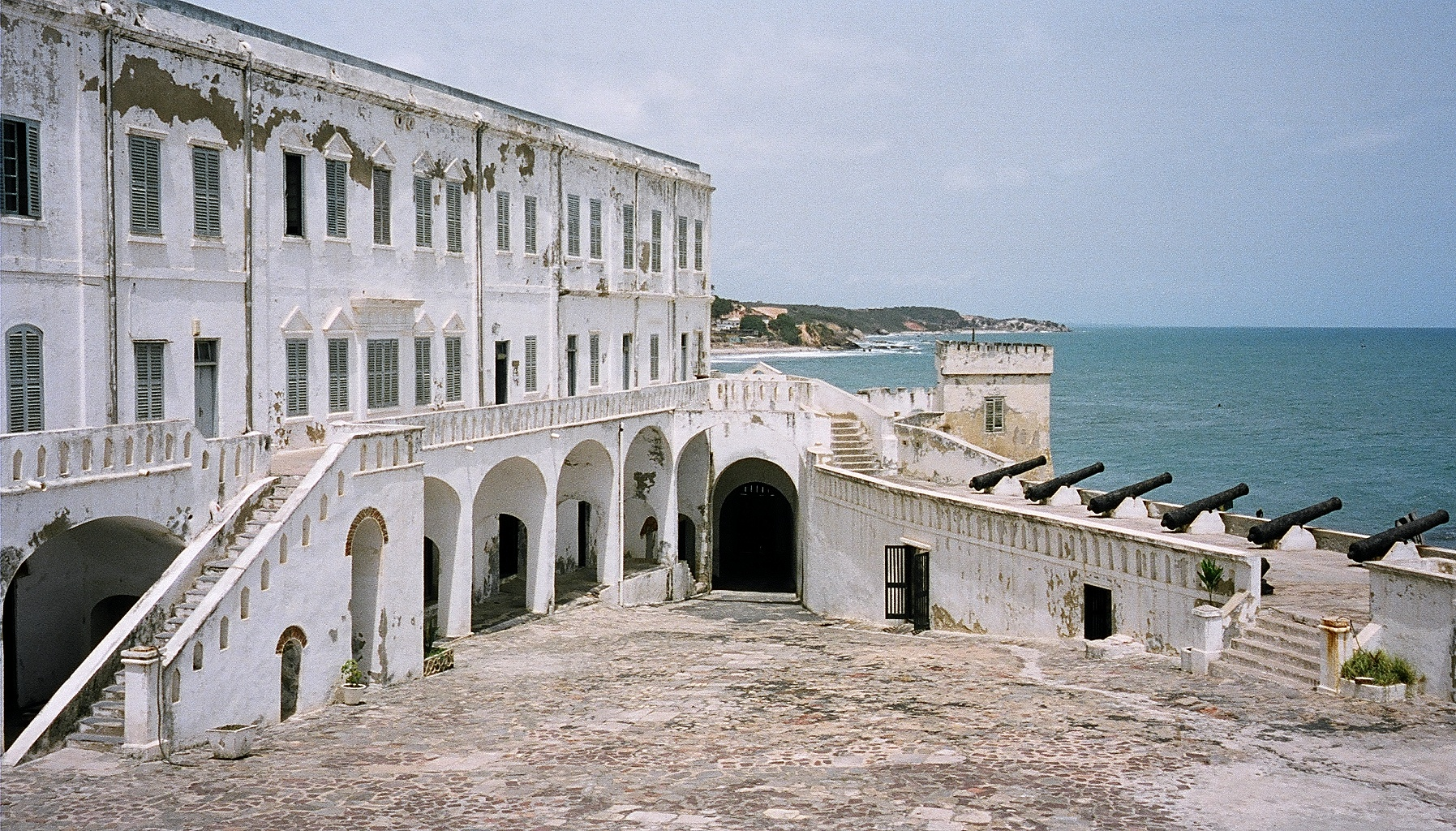
Cape Coast Castle

King's early career was at sea in a variety of vessels involved in the slave trade in the Caribbean and West Africa. In 1766 he went to Africa as second mate on the Royal Charlotte which was transporting the African company's stores to Cape Coast Castle. The ship took on 120 slaves on the Gold Coast. It was probably during this period that he met his future business partners Anthony Calvert (1735–1809) and William Camden when he was master on ships owned by them. He became close friends with Anthony Calvert and named one of his sons Anthony Calvert King.

In 1771, while he was master of the Surrey (or Surry), owned by Anthony Calvert, he was involved in an incident that saw him charged with the murder of a sailor, John Warren, for which he stood trial at the Old Bailey in 1776. He was said to have kicked Warren to death while calling him "an Irish son of a bitch". His bail of £500 was provided by Calvert and the London wine merchant Robert Manley. He was acquitted of the charge.

His sea career was summarised in evidence given to the House of Commons in 1789.

== Camden, Calvert and King ==
The first venture in which King partnered with Anthony Calvert and William Camden was the voyage of the Three Good Friends to St Vincent via Cape Coast Castle in 1773 when he was joint master with Calvert.

Ships of the firm made 77 voyages carrying slaves between the 1780s and the early 1800s and transported over 22,000 enslaved persons from West Africa, 65% of whom disembarked in Jamaica, 12% in the Guianas, 14% in other parts of the Caribbean and the remainder elsewhere; the firm's activities also included supplying British dockyards and overseas garrisons, whaling, transporting convicts, and trading in commodities from the East Indies.

King is credited by Kenneth Cozens with further expanding the firm's activities into the fields of banking, insurance, and London infrastructure such as the construction of London Docks. His son William was a director of the London Dock Company.

William Camden died in 1796 but the firm continued under the same name until Calvert died in 1809.

== Other activities ==
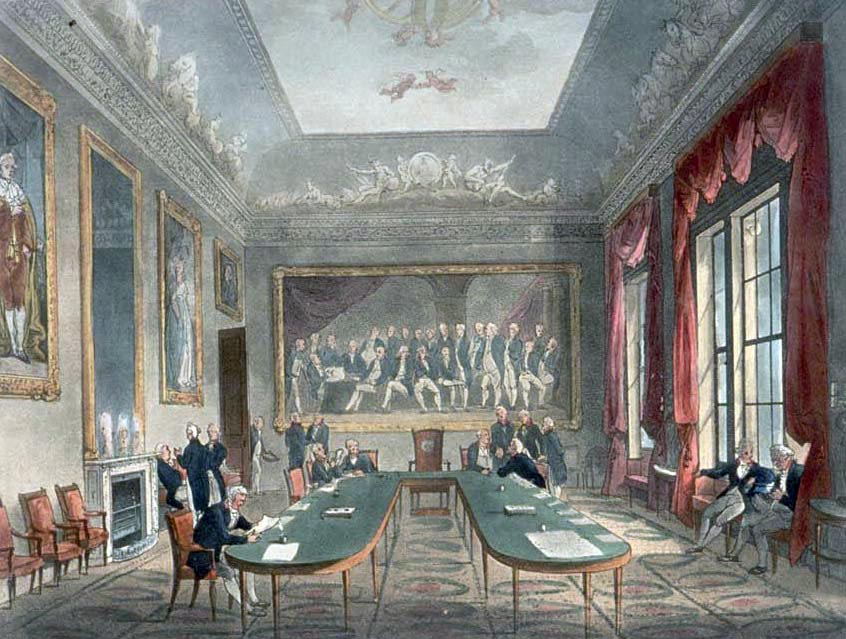
"A meeting at Trinity House" from The Microcosm of London; or, London in Miniature, 1810

In 1771, King was one of the founding subscribers of Lloyd's of London. He was also a governor of the Foundling Hospital.

He was elected a younger brother of Trinity House in October 1780 on the recommendation of Timothy Mangles, a ship owner in Wapping, and an elder brother in 1788. Many of those involved in the trade with West Africa were members of Trinity House. He featured in the Great Court Painting that was commissioned in 1794 to mark the design of Trinity House. Contemporaries of Thomas King among the elder brothers around 1810 included the Duke of Marlborough, two Lords, four Earls, and two Viscounts.

He was a member of the Blackheath Golf Club (later the Royal Blackheath Golf Club) whose members had strong Masonic and slaving connections.

== British Guiana ==
He owned the Friendship estate in Demerara, British Guiana, that included over 300 slaves in the early nineteenth century, and the Sarah estate in Demerara with over 170. He also owned the Schoonhoven or Schoonhaven estate in Essequibo or Demerara.

== Death and legacy ==
King's will was proved in February 1824. He left an estate of £120,000, the majority of which was divided between his family with some in trust and legacies to be paid five years after his death. According to records, his son William took over the Friendship and Sarah estates in British Guiana.

=== Descendants ===
- Lafayette King: August 1, 1935 - September 28, 2023
- Chandra King: 1960 -
- Rodney King: October 15, 1961 -
- Laverne King: September 13, 1966 -
- Kevin King: June 28, 1959 - January 19, 2022
- John C. King
- Esther Autry King
- Son Early King

Located in Compton, CA; Cullman, Alabama; Bay Minette, Alabama.
