= Anthony Calvert =

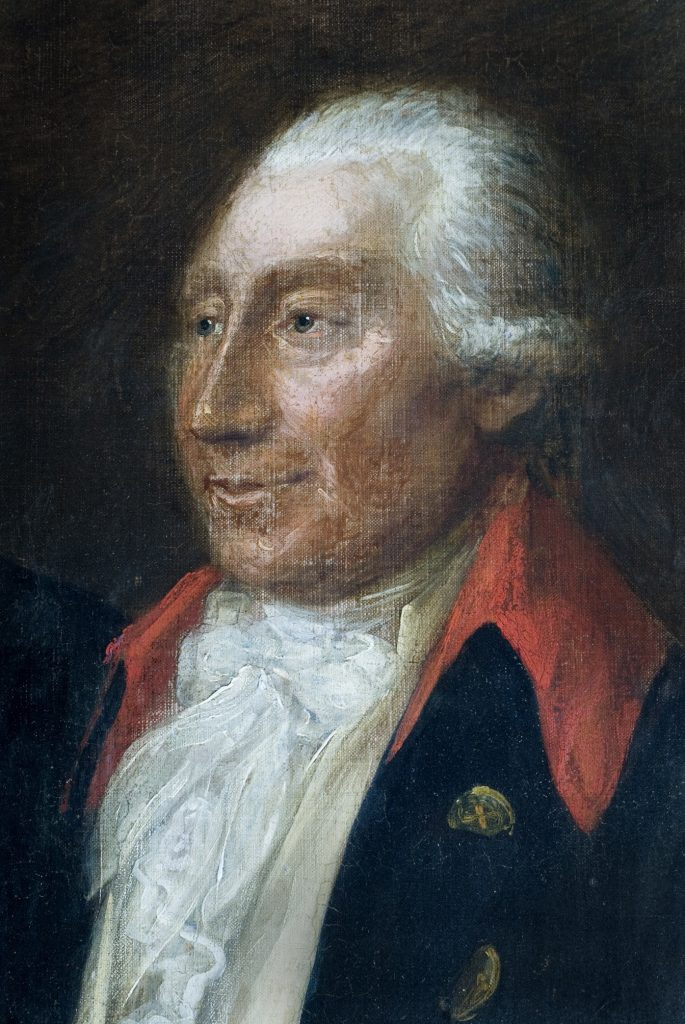
- Born: 1735
- Died: 1809 (aged 73–74)
- Occupations: Slave trader and merchant
- Board member of: Camden, Calvert and King

Anthony Calvert (1735–1809) was an English entrepreneur of the eighteenth century particularly noted for his activity as a slave trader. He was a managing partner of Camden, Calvert and King, one of the most prominent slave trading enterprises in London. They imported tea from China and cotton from India. He also became involved in the transportation of English convicts first to Africa and later to Australia.

The partnership was also involved in South Sea whaling late in the 18th century. The firm had at least six vessels active in the trade in the years between 1782 and 1796. They were also supporters of the West India Dock Company.

Calvert first made several voyages from the early 1760s along slave trade routes before buying and becoming master of the Charlotte in 1766. By 1773 he went into business with Thomas King with whom he took joint command of the Three Good Friends.

== Death ==
Calvert died in 1808 in Broadstairs, aged 75. At his death his estate included consolidated government stock valued at over £14,000, which went to two of his nieces.
