= Tobago (disambiguation) =

Tobago is an island that is part of the Republic of Trinidad and Tobago.

Tobago may also refer to:

== Places ==
- Tobago Cays, an archipelago comprising five small uninhabited islands located in the Southern Grenadine
- Great Tobago, an island of the British Virgin Islands in the Caribbean
- Little Tobago, an island, part of the Republic of Trinidad and Tobago
- Little Tobago, British Virgin Islands, an island of the British Virgin Islands in the Caribbean

== Transportation ==
- HMS Tobago, the name of more than one ship of the British Royal Navy
- Tobago (1793 ship), whaler and slave ship
- SOCATA TB-10 Tobago, a light aircraft
- 45635 Tobago, a British LMS Jubilee Class locomotive

== Other uses ==
- Tobago, a 1934 Latvian novel by Aleksandrs Grīns
