= Spratly (surname) =

Spratly is a surname. Notable people with the surname include:

- Henry Spratly, notable for surveying and naming Mischief Reef in 1791, when sailing through what is now known as the Spratly Islands
- Richard Spratly (1802–1870), master of the British whaler, the Cyrus South Seaman, notable for naming Spratly Island
- William Spratly, the Second Officer of the British whaler, the Cyrus South Seaman and brother of Richard Spratly
