= Resolution (1779 ship) =

History

Great Britain
- Name: Thomas Hall
- Launched: 1776, Liverpool (Note: The Register of Shipping gives the launch place as Bristol, and the launch year as 1777.)
- Renamed: Resolution (1779)
- Fate: Last mentioned 1805

General characteristics
- Tons burthen: 317, or 400 (bm)
- Complement: 30
- Armament: 1778:14 × 4-pounder guns + 2 × 6-pounder coehorns + 6 swivel guns; 1779:12 × 6-pounder + 4 × 9-pounder guns; 1781:6 × 9-pounder guns + 6 × 12-pounder guns "of the New Construction"; 1798: 14 × 6&9-pounder guns + 6 swivel guns; 1804: 2 × 4-pounder guns

Resolution was launched at Liverpool in 1776 as the West Indiaman Thomas Hall; she was renamed in 1779. She sailed briefly as a privateer. Then between 1791 and 1804 Revolution made some six voyages as a whaler. On one voyage, in 1793, a French frigate captured her, but Resolution was re-captured. In 1804 a new owner returned her to the West Indies trade. She does not appear to have sailed after early 1805.

== Merchantman ==
Resolution first appeared in Lloyd's Register (LR) in 1779 when Thomas Hall was renamed Resolution. (Thomas Hall did not appear in earlier issues of LR.)

Thomas Hall was a West Indiaman. Captain Andrew Beard had acquired a letter of marque on 17 January 1778. Resolution continued in the West Indies trade, after sailing as a privateer. Under the command of Captain Beard, she was armed with 22 guns and had a crew of 100 men.

| Year | Master | Owner | Trade | Source |
|---|---|---|---|---|
| 1779 | A.Beard; B.Smith | P.Holmes | Liverpool–Jamaica | LR |
| 1781 | J.Peters; T.C.Chivers | Lane & Co. | London–Georgia; London–Nevis | LR; |
| 1792 | T.Chevers; J.Russell | Lane & Co. J.Mellish | London–Nevis; London–Southern Fishery | LR; thorough repair 1792 |

== Whaler ==
In 1791 Peter, William & Samuel Mellish purchased Resolution to use her as a whaler in the British Southern Whale Fishery.

1st whaling voyage (1791–1792): Captain Joseph Russell sailed in 1791. Resolution returned on 25 December 1792.

Aborted voyage (1793): Captain Gardner sailed from Deal on 31 March 1793, bound for the South Seas. On 16 June LL reported that Resolution, which had been sailing from London to the South Seas, had fallen prey to a French frigate. However, Resolution had been retaken and sent into Lisbon. In 1793 Resolution was mentioned in the Protection List.

2nd whaling voyage (1794–1795): In 1794 Resolution was under the command of John Lock(e). On 2 January 1794 Resolution, Lock, master, sailed from Deal, bound for Botany Bay. On 11 March she was at Portsmouth. She arrived at Port Jackson on 10 September 1794 with provisions. Australian records show that when she left she was supposedly bound for India. However, she was reported to have arrived on 9 February 1795 at Walprazia from Botany Bay.

3rd whaling voyage (1795–1796): Captain John Locke (or Lock) sailed from London in 1795 for the waters off Peru. Resolution returned to London on 12 December 1796 with 82 tuns of sperm oil, 123 tuns of whale oil, and 80 cwt of whale bone.

4th whaling voyage (1798–1800): Captain William Trish acquired a letter of marque on 25 August 1798. Captain William Irish sailed from London on 7 September 1798, and Deal on the 20th, bound for the South Seas.

Resolution, Cornwall, and William returned from Peru together. On 27 December 1800 they were 25 leagues west of Scilly when they encountered a 20-gun French privateer. In the ensuing engagement Cornwall took many shots to her hull. By the time the French privateer sailed off, Cornwall had eleven feet of water in her hold and was quite water-logged. The engagement had lasted five hours and the whalers arrived at Falmouth on the 28th. Resolution arrived at Gravesend on 11 January 1801. She underwent a thorough repair in 1801.

5th whaling voyage (1801): Captain Irish sailed on 31 March 1801 for the South Seas, and returned on 1 December. Resolution was mentioned on the Protection List in 1801 and 1802.

6th whaling voyage (1802–1803): Captain Irish sailed from London on 16 February 1802, bound for South Africa. Resolution was at Delagoa Bay on 8 August 1802 in company with other whalers, including Britannia, DuBuc and Charming Kitty. Resolution was last at the Cape in January 1803. On 18 February 1803 she left St Helena in a convoy with East Indiamen and the whaler Spencer, with HMS Romney as escort. Resolution arrived back at London on 22 April 1803.

== West Indiaman ==
The Melishes sold Resolution circa 1804 to a Mr. M. Gibson, who then sailed her as a West Indiaman again.

| Year | Master | Owner | Trade | Source |
|---|---|---|---|---|
| 1805 | W.Irish; M.Gibson | Mellish & Co. Gibson | London–Southern Fishery; London–Trinidad | Register of Shipping; thorough repair 1801 |

Resolution made one voyage to Trinidad and back. Then on 21 January 1805 she came into Falmouth. She had become leaky while sailing from London to Trinidad.

Although the registers continued to carry Resolution for some more years, the data was stale. She also did not reappear in Lloyd's List's SAD data after having come into Falmouth.
