= Barbara (1799 ship) =

History

Great Britain
- Launched: 1792, France
- Acquired: 1799 by purchase of a prize
- Captured: Late 1801 or early 1802

General characteristics
- Tons burthen: 386 (bm)
- Complement: 30
- Armament: 12 × 6-pounder guns

Barbara was built in France in 1792. The Royal Navy captured her circa 1798, gave her a thorough repair in one of their yards ("King's Yard"), but then sold her. She sailed on one voyage as a West Indiaman. She then became a whaler in the British Southern Whale Fisheries. On her first whaling voyage she sailed to Walvis Bay. She was captured, either near there or on her way home, and taken into the Río de la Plata.

== Career ==
Barbara first appeared in Lloyd's Register (LR) in 1799 with J.Blair, master, Woodyear, owner, and trade London–Saint Kitts. She was a French vessel, launched in 1792, and taken in prize circa 1798. The Royal Navy had her repaired in 1799 in one of its yards, but apparently then did not take her in but rather sold her.

Barbara, Blair, master, sailed from Gravesend on 28 April 1799, bound for Saint Kitts. She returned in late June 1800.

Woodyear sold Barbara to Daniel Bennett. (Note: This Barbara has been confused with Barbara. Part of the reason is that LR carried stale data on the 1799 Barbara and did not recognize the change of ownership and trade.)

The Register of Shipping (RS) for 1801 showed Barbara with G.Carr, master, Bennett, owner, and trade London–Southern fishery.

Barbara received two letters of marque before she sailed on her whale-hunting voyage. First, Captain George Kerr acquired a letter of marque on 25 October 1800, and then Captain William Clarke acquired one on 11 November. Captain Kerr had been master of another Bennett whaler, Favorite. Captain Lewis Llewelin acquired a letter of marque for her on 30 October. However, he apparently did not sail her.

Instead, on 17 November 1800, Barbara, Clarke, master, and Favourite, Allan, master, sailed from Deal, bound for the South Seas.

== Fate ==
Barbara. Clark, master, was reported to be at Walwich Bay in August 1801, together with a number of other whalers, including Charming Kitty, Elligood, Favorite (Allen, master), Indispensable, and Perseverance, and that they were generally successful. LL reported on 15 March 1802 that Barbara. Clark, master, had been captured and taken into the Río de la Plata.
