= Belisarius (disambiguation) =

Belisarius (c. 500 – 565) was a military commander of the Byzantine Empire under the emperor Justinian I.

Belisarius may also refer to:

- Belisarius (scorpion), genus of scorpions
- Belisarius (play), 1724 tragedy by the British writer William Phillips
- Belisarius (1781 ship), privateer ship of the United States
- Belisarius Productions, production company
- Belisarius series, a series of alternate history books by Eric Flint and David Drake

== See also ==
- Belisarius (ship) for other ships with a similar spelling
- Piotr Domaradzki, Polish-American journalist who edited in Wikipedia under the name Bellisarius
- Velizar, Serbian and Bulgarian masculine given name
