= Aurora (1789 ship) =

British merchant ship and whaler 1789–1809

History

Great Britain
- Name: Aurora
- Owner: 1789:Easterby; 1799:P. Mellish
- Builder: Whitby
- Launched: 1789
- Fate: Last listed in 1809

General characteristics
- Tons burthen: 300 (bm)
- Complement: 1801:28; 1804:26
- Armament: 1801:10 × 9&4-pounder guns + 6 swivel guns; 1804:10 × 4&9-pounder guns + 6 swivel guns

Aurora was launched at Whitby in 1789. Between 1799 and 1806 she made four voyages as a whaler to the British southern whale fishery. She was last listed in 1809 with stale data since her whaling voyages.

== Career ==
There is some ambiguity around Aurora's launch year. Neither the Register of Shipping (RS), nor Lloyd's Register (LR) provided one. The most complete account of Whitby vessels gave her launch year as 1789, with owner F. Easterby.

Aurora first appeared in the RS in 1800 with J.Bevan, master, Mellish & Co. owner, and trade London–South Seas. It gave her origin simply as "British", and stated that she had undergone a thorough repair. By the 1802 volume the RS showed Aurora's master as Massey, her origin as Whitby, and her having undergone the thorough repair in 1799.

Aurora first appeared in LR in 1801 with S. Macey, master, Millen & Co., owner, and trade London–Southern Fishery.

Peter Mellish owned Aurora for all four of her whaling voyages. (Note: Earlier, Mellish had owned an Aurora, of 350 tons, built in Whitby, that had been a whaler in the northern whale fishery. One source conflates these two Whitby whalers.)

1st whaling voyage (1799–1801): Captain Stephen Macey (or Macy, or Massey) sailed from London on 3 May 1799, bound for Walvis Bay. Aurora returned to London on 15 April 1801. (Note: Another source states that Aurora was sealing at South Georgia in 1799, but returned in June. She then sailed in the south seas whale fishery.)

2nd whaling voyage (1801–1802): Captain James Birnie acquired a letter of marque on 2 June 1801. Aurora left England on 23 June, and returned on 4 July 1804.

3rd whaling voyage (1803–1804): Captain Thomas Gray (or Gay, or Thomas Goyes), sailed from England on 21 February 1803. He sailed during the Peace of Amiens and so did not acquire a letter of marque. Aurora returned on 6 April 1804.

4th whaling voyage (1804–1806): Captain Peter Long acquired a letter of marque on 4 July 1804. On 4 September 1804, Captain Peleg Long sailed from England. Cyrus reported that Aurora had been at Saint Helena on 26 March 1806, having arrived from Brazil with 200 barrels of sperm oil and 300 barrels of whale oil. At St Helena Aurora also took on part of the cargo of oil from Commerce, which intended to continue to seek out whales. Aurora returned to England on 10 June 1806.

== Fate ==
Aurora was last listed in 1809 with stale data since her whaling voyages.
