= Elligood (1794 ship) =

History

Great Britain
- Name: Elligood or Ellegood
- Namesake: Possibly Jacob Ellegood
- Owner: Liddle & Co.; 1798-1805: Daniel Bennett
- Builder: Kennebecasis River, New Brunswick
- Launched: 1794, or 1793
- Fate: No longer listed in Lloyd's Register in 1807

General characteristics
- Tons burthen: 327 (bm)
- Propulsion: Sail
- Complement: 28
- Armament: 1796:10 × 4-pounder guns; 1800:10 × 6-pounder & 12-pounder guns + 4 × swivel guns

Elligood (or Ellegood) was constructed in Nova Scotia in 1794, for Liddle & Co. She performed one voyage for the British East India Company (EIC). She was primarily a whaler, but also visited Australia. She is last listed in 1806.

== Career ==
Ellegood was registered in London in 1795, with F. Holman, master, and Liddle & Co., owners. The entry in Lloyd's Register gave her place of construction as Nova Scotia and her year of launch as 1794. It also gave her trade as London-Martinique.

Captain Francis Holman sailed from Gravesend on 11 October 1796, bound for Madras and Bombay for the EIC. She reached Madras on 15 February 1797, Cochin on 8 March, Goa on 20 March, and Bombay on 28 March. She left Bombay on 28 June, reached St Helena on 11 September, and arrived at Long Reach on 13 December.

In 1798, Elligood was sold to Daniel Bennett for service as a South Seas whaler. He would remain her owner through 1805.

In 1798, she sailed to the east coast of Africa under the command of Captain Christopher Dixon. She returned to Britain on 16 July 1799.

On 15 January 1800, Captain Christopher Dickson received a letter of marque for Ellegood.

Under Dixson's command, Elligood sailed from London on 19 February. Several whalers sailed at the same time, including Kingston, Thomas Denis, master. Elligood and Kingston were to sail in company on a speculative voyage to New Holland for whales. They were then to examine King George Sound, proceed to Shark Bay and the north-west coast, and return via Madagascar and southern Africa.

Elligood and Kingston arrived in Cape Town on 5 May 1800. The two vessels did some whaling off the African coast and then turned east, cruising off Western Australia from 9 August to 22 December. On 27 August, they were at King George Sound. There, at the entrance to Oyster Harbour, Western Australia (34°59′37.9″S 117°56′39.8″E, Dixson made a small garden and left a copper plate engraved "Aug. 27 1800. Chr Dixson, ship Elligood". Late in 1801, Matthew Flinders found the plate on his way along the southern coast of Australia to Port Jackson.

Ellegood returned to Cape Town in May 1801, under the command of Job Anthony as it had been reported that both Dixson and nine crew had died of scurvy. Dixson had died on 4 January 1801. On 3 November, Lloyd's List reported that in August she had been at Walfish Bay, together with a number of other whalers such as Barbara, Charming Kitty, Indispensable, and Perseverance, and that they were generally successful. Ellegood was at St Helena on 19 September, and arrived at London on 8 December.

== Fate ==
She was still reported as whaling in 1805. Lloyd's Register and the Register of Shipping for 1805, both carry Elligood with the unchanged information as to master, owner, and trade. The Register of Shipping shows her origin as New Brunswick, and changes her launch year from 1796 to 1793.
