= Mather & Co. =

British trio of brothers and Navy contractors

Mather & Co. were three brothers (or cousins) that began in commerce and contracting for the British Royal Navy. They became owners of whalers and between them at one or another time were owners or part-owners of up to 29 vessels that engaged in the British Southern Whale Fishery between 1775 and 1815.

The brothers operated from premises at Orchard Place, Blackwall, London, 12 Birchin Liane, Cornhill, London, Mark Lane and Mincing Lane, Tower, Copthall buildings, Throgmorton Street, and Finsbury Square.

The three Mathers were:

James Mather (b.1738 – d. 1796): James Mather began in the 1770s trading with North America and during the American War of Independence chartered storeships to the Royal Navy. When he died three of his sons continued the business until 1803.

Thomas Mather (.c.1736-38 – d. 1798): Thomas Mather was a mariner in the whaling business, and a member of the London Corporation in 1800.

John Mather (d.1802): John Mather was a mariner in the whaling business, and a member of the London Corporation in 1800.

== Ships ==
The database of vessels engaged in the British Southern Whale Fisheries lists 28 whaling vessels that the Mathers owned or part-owned at one time or another. However, some of these vessels may have traveled to the South Seas as convict transports to Australia, or supply ships. There are other vessels associated with Mathers & Co. that were not whalers.

- Amelia (1800), of 200 tons (bm), was a government transport built in Bristol that a French privateer captured in 1800, and that the Guernsey privateer cutter Maria recaptured and sent into Gibraltar. She was captured a second time and this time her captors took her into Algeciras.
- Backhouse (1801-1805)
- Bellisarius (1789-1799)
- Benjamin (1787-1808)
- Brothers (1796-1808)
- Butterworth (1797-1802)
- Charlton (1803-1811)
- Charming Kitty (1799-1813)
- Coldstream (1800-June 1805)
- Countess de Galvaez (1787-c.1788)
- Crescent (1805–loss)
- Cyrus (1804-1814)
- Dragon (1777-1801)
- DuBuc (1800-1806)
- Earl of Suffolk (1775-1783); East Indiaman sold to James Mather, London, and renamed. Hired out as a transport to North America. Sold 1783.
- Lord Sandwich (ex-HMS Endeavour)
- Favorite (1802-1805)
- Friendship (1781-1796)
- Harriot (1801-1807)
- Heart of Oak, aka Hannibal (1779-1789)
- Juliana (1778-1786) East Indiaman sold to James Mather for use as an armed escort ship and transport, and renamed.
- London (1795-1797)
- Look (1776-Loss); East Indiaman purchased by James Mather and renamed. Hired out as a troopship to the North American colonies. Wrecked in 1779 in the St. Lawrence River.
- Lord Howe (1772–1781) was the East Indiaman Glatton, that Mather & Co. purchased in 1772 and renamed. She served the British Navy as a transport and probably foundered in 1781.
- Lord Townsend (1776-1779); East Indiaman sold to James Mather and renamed. Hired out as an armed ship and transport. Destroyed by fire at Kingston, Jamaica.
- Mercury (1785-1803)
- New Euphrates (1796-1803)
- Nimrod (1787-loss)
- Pandour (1807-loss)
- Prince of Wales (1786-1794)
- Raynham Hall (1780-1783) East Indiaman sold to James Mather and renamed.
- Sarah (1810-1813)
- Scorpion (1803-loss)
- Tobago (1795-1797)
- Triumph (1793-Loss)
- Ulysses (1786-1790)
- Vulture (1802-Loss)
- William (1793)
