= William (1770 ship) =

History

Great Britain
- Name: William
- Launched: 1770, France
- Fate: Last listed in the Register of Shipping in 1809

General characteristics
- Tons burthen: 302, or 305 (bm)
- Complement: 28
- Armament: 1801:12 × 6-pounder guns + 2 × swivel guns; 1802: 2 × 9-pounder + 8 × 4-pounder guns

William was a merchant vessel built in France in 1770 or 1771. From 1791 she made numerous voyages as a whaler in the southern whale fishery. She also made one voyage in 1793 transporting supplies from England to Australia. She then resumed whaling, continuing until 1809.

== Career ==
William first entered Lloyd's Register in 1786. The table below recapitulates information from Lloyd's Register for William, built in France in 1770.

Year	Master	Owner	Burthen	Trade
1786	R. Hill	Matthews	350	London-Dominica
1787	R. Hill	Matthews	350	London-Dominica
1789	S. Hill; S. Pearce	Matthews	350	South Carolina—London; London—"Piscat" (Piscataqua ?)
1790	S. Pearce	Clapcoat	305	London—Piscat
1791	T.Sweetland; John Ralph Moss	Clapcoat; Enderby	305	London—Piscat; London—South Seas Fishery

Lieutenant John Ralph Moss RN became William's master in January 1791. Sailing from London on 25 February, she was driven ashore at Sheerness with many others by a sudden blizzard.She finally departed for the South Sea from the Downs on 3 April.William proceeded first to Delagoa Bay in Southeast Africa, where she was reported on 28 August. By 18 January 1792 she was spoken with north of the Falkland Islands, so she had doubled both capes by the time she arrived in the Pacific, where she touched at the Juan Fernandez Islands later that month. She was reported on the coast of Peru in April and September, and called again at the Juan Fernandez Islands in November for firewood and fresh provisions to counter scurvy. She passed Gravesend inbound on 21 April 1793 with 141 tuns of sperm oil, five tuns of whale oil, and 2347 seal skins.

Under the command of William Folger, she sailed from England via Cork, Ireland, on 21 September 1793, with 2080 barrels of beef and pork, the Colony's new Assistant Chaplain, Rev. Samuel Marsden, and one female convict. William arrived at Port Jackson, New South Wales, on 10 March 1794. After unloading her goods, she purportedly left for China.

There is some confusion about her ownership and later role on this voyage. Lloyd's Register gave her owner as Samuel Enderby & Sons. A database of whaling voyages gives her owner as Mather & Co., but also lists Enderbys as her owners from 1791 on. Both sources agree that she was a whaler.

Apparently, William went whaling off Peru instead of going to China. She was reported off the coast of Peru, and then on the coast of Chile in November 1794. She returned to Britain on 29 November 1795 with 64 tuns of sperm oil, 57 tuns of whale oil, and 32 cwt of whale bone.

On 12 April 1796, Captain George Fitch sailed William for the South Seas whaling grounds. She was reported to have been off Massafuero (Más Afuera) Island in August. Then at Chatham Island (Galapagos) on 6 November. She was in company with Greenwich between February and May 1797 at the Galapagos. On 8 July Williams was at Cape Corrientes (Mexico). She was off Chile on 21 November. Then she was off Bahia (possibly Bahía de Banderas), California, in January 1798 bound for the Galapagos and then Easter Island. She was reported at St Helena shortly before she returned to England on 10 July 1798.

Fitch made another whaling voyage in William, sailing to Peru in 1798. William, Cornwall, and Resolution returned from Peru together. On 27 December 1800 they were 25 leagues west of Scilly when they encountered a 20-gun French privateer. In the ensuing engagement Cornwall took many shots to her hull. By the time the French privateer sailed off Cornwall had eleven feet of water in her hold and was quite water-logged. The engagement had lasted five hours and the whalers arrived at Falmouth on the 28th. William returned to Gravesend on 4 January 1801.

On 4 March 1801 Captain Robert Poole received a letter of marque for William.

Poole left Britain on 20 March. William was reported off the coast of Brazil in November. Later, she was reported at St Helena. She returned to Britain on 25 May 1802.

The Register of Shipping for 1802 showed William's master changing from Poole to J. Cottle. Her owner was still S. Enderby, and her trade was still the South Seas Fishery.

Obediah Cottle (or Catterell) sailed from Britain on 22 August, bound for the Pacific. William was reported to have been in the Pacific in November 1803 and March 1804, and at St Helena on 23 December. She returned to Britain on 21 March 1805.

== Fate ==
William was last listed in the Register of Shipping in 1809.
