= Commerce (1786 ship) =

History

Great Britain
- Name: Commerce
- Builder: Bermuda
- Launched: 1786
- Fate: Last listed 1806

General characteristics
- Tons burthen: 220, or 252, or 265, (bm)
- Complement: 50
- Armament: 1799:8 × 6-pounder guns; 1803:16 × 6-pounder guns & 18-pounder carronades; 1803:18 × 6-pounder + 2 × 9-pounder guns + 2 × 18-pounder carronades
- Notes: Cedar and pine

Commerce was launched at Bermuda in 1786. She initially sailed between London and North America, and later between London and the West Indies. In 1803 new owners dispatched her on a whaling voyage. She may have been lost in late 1806 as she was returning from her voyage; she was last listed in 1806.

== Career ==
Commerce first appeared in Lloyd's Register (LR) in 1789 with P. Warren, master, A. Shaw, owner, and trade London–Charleston. Thereafter she traded with North America and as a West Indiaman.

Whaling voyage: On 20 June 1803 Captain Jacob Eckstein acquired a letter of marque. He then sailed Commerce for Patagonia. She was reported to have been well at the "Bay of St Fundy" around April 1804.

On 26 February 1805, Lloyd's List reported that although Commerce, of Liverpool, Eckstein, master, had been reported lost off Patagonia, Vigilant had left her "all well" there. Commerce, Echstein, was reported to have been at Patagonia on 4 October 1804 with 150 tons of oil.

Lloyd's List reported on 23 May 1806 that Commerce was at St Helena where she transferred her oil to DuBuc as Commerce had been condemned there as she was returning from the South Seas. However, a report a week later revealed that Commerce simply intended to proceed on another voyage. She therefore had transferred her cargo of oil, about 150 tons, to DuBuc and Aurora.

On 22 October 1806 Commerce, Eckstein, master, was off Scilly, returning from the South Seas.

== Fate ==
Lloyd's List reports a Commerce, Jenaway, master, arriving back at Liverpool on 29 October, from the South Seas. However, Lloyd's Register for 1806 carried the annotation "lost" by her name.

== Lloyd's Register ==
Year	Master	Owner	Trade	Source and notes
1792	P.Warren; J.Campbell	A. Shaw; R.Shedden	London–South Carolina; London-New Brunswick	LR
1796	Campbell; J. Woods	R.Shedden; J. Chorley	London–New Brunswick; London–Tobago	LR; burthen amended from 220 tons to 252 tons
1797	J. Woods; D. Clark	J. Chorley	Liverpool–Tortola	LR
1799	D. Clarke	J.Chorley	Liverpool–Tortola	LR
1803	D.Clarke; J. Ecksteen	J.Chorley; Walton & Co.	Liverpool–Tortola; Liverpool–South Seas	LR
1806	J.Ecksteen	Walton & Co.	Liverpool–South Seas	LR; repairs 1800
