= William Spratly =

William Spratly was the Second Officer of the British whaler, Cyrus and brother of its captain, Richard Spratly, who is notable for naming Spratly Island and being the namesake of the Spratly Islands. Richard Spratly is often mistakenly named William Spratly when referring to this incident.

It is possible, though unlikely, that this may be the same William Spratly who captained the Norwegian steamer, SS Douvre, between 1883 and 1900.
