= Heart of Oak (1762 ship) =

History

Great Britain
- Name: Heart of Oak
- Namesake: Heart of Oak
- Builder: South Carolina
- Launched: 1762
- Fate: No longer listed in Lloyd's Register in 1790

General characteristics
- Tons burthen: 300 (bm)
- Propulsion: Sail
- Armament: 20 × 6-pounder guns

Heart of Oak, of 300 tons (bm), was launched in South Carolina in 1762. She spent most of her career as a merchant vessel, though between 1777 and 1782 she served the Royal Navy as a hired armed ship. She was last listed in 1789.

Lloyd's List for 29 May 1764 reported that Heart of Oak, Gwinn, master, sailing from South Carolina to London, had arrived off Beachy.

== Hired armed ship ==
Heart of Oak was commissioned in November 1777 under Commander Nathaniel Crosby, and served in the Liverpool area.

When the French attempted to invade Jersey in 1779, Admiral Mariot Arbuthnot, who had left Spithead with a squadron escorting a convoy en route to North America, sent the convoy in to Torbay and proceeded to the relief of Jersey with his ships. However, when he arrived he found that Captain Ford of HMS Unicorn had the situation well in hand. The French flotilla retreated to Saint-Malo, but then anchored at Coutances. A British squadron under Captain Sir James Wallace in HMS Experiment attacked the French on 13 May 1779 at Cancale Bay. The British managed to set Valeur (6 guns), Écluse (8), and Guêpe (6) on fire, though the French were able to salvage Guêpe after the British withdrew. The British also captured Danaé (26 or 32 guns), a brig, and a sloop. Heart of Oak apparently was present in some capacity both at the relief and the subsequent action.

In October 1779, Captain Nathaniel Crosby underwent a court martial for embezzlement. He was found guilty, cashiered, and barred from any further employment in the Royal Navy. The purser, who testified against the captain, was discharged without court martial, but it was later established that he had not benefited from the fraud.

Heart of Oak shared with Eagle and Mary in the salvage money paid in January 1780 for the recapture of the brig Thames. The prize money notice, though, does not specify that Heart of Oak was the armed ship, and not the privateer by the same name.

From October 1779 to 1780 she served in the Bristol area under the command of W. Reman. He was still her commander into 1782. Lloyd's List for 14 December 1781 reported that HMS Aurora and Heart of Oak had sent the Three Sisters, Cornelieson, master, into Penzance. Three Sisters had been carrying a cargo of planks from Bruges to Nantes.

At the end of the American Revolutionary War the Royal Navy returned its hired armed vessels to their owners. Heart of Oak then resumed her mercantile career.

== Lloyd's Register ==
The information in Lloyd's Register is only as accurate and up-to-date as the information owners of vessels bothered to provide. One finds, therefore, information that is stale-dated and inaccurate (i.e., contradicted in later listings). In the listing below, there is clearly a confusion of names between 1784 and 1787.

Year	Vessel	Master	Owner	Trade	Notes
1764	Heart of Oak	H. Gunn	Grubb & Co.	London	200 tons (bm); South Carolina-built (1763)
1765–1775					Not available on-line
1776	Heart of Oak	Henry Gunn	Alex. Watson	Carolina-London	200 tons (bm); Carolina-built (1762)
1777					Not available on-line
1778	Heart of Oak	Hr. Gunn	A. Watson	Carolina-London	200 tons (bm); Carolina-built (1762)
1779	Heart of Oak	Crosbie	J Mather	London transport	300 tons (bm); South Carolina built; 20 × 9-pounder guns
1780	Heart of Oak	W. Redman	J. Mather	London armed ship	300 tons (bm); South Carolina built; 20 × 9-pounder guns
1781	Heart of Oak	W. Redman	J. Mather	London armed ship	20 × 9-pounder guns
1782	Heart of Oak	W. Redman	J. Mather	London armed ship	South Carolina built; 20 × 9-pounder guns
1783	Heart of Oak	W. Redman	J. Mather	London armed ship	South Carolina built; 20 × 9-pounder guns
1784	Heart of Oak; Now – illegible	Grandwater? Rogers	J. Mather	Africa-London	300 tons; Americas built
	Heart of Oak	R. Redman; J. Mather	J. Mather	London	300 tons; South Carolina built (1762)
	Hannibal				No entry
	Prince of Wales				No entry
1785					Not available on line
1786	Hannibal	J. Banfield	J. Mather	London-Africa	310 tons (bm); Sidmouth built (1779); great repair 1784
	Hannibal	J. Bamfield	J. Mather	Antigua-London	300 tons (bm); South Carolina built (1762); former Heart of Oak
1787	Hannibal	J. Banfield	J. Mather	London-Africa	310 tons (bm); Sidmouth-built (1779); great repair 1784; "now Prince of Wales"
	Hannibal	J. Bamfield	J. Mather	Antigua-London	300 tons (bm); South Carolina-built (1762); great repair 1784; ex-"Heart of Oak"
	Prince of Wales	J. Mason	J. Mather	London – Botany Bay	300 tons (bm); almost rebuilt 1786; named Hannibal in 1786
1788					Not available on-line
1789	Heart of Oak; Now: illegible	W. Gillis	J. Mather	London – Quebec	300 tons (bm); South Carolina-built (1762)
