= Belisarius (ship) =

Several vessels have been named Belisarius (or Bellisarius), for Belisarius:

- Bellisarius (1762 ship) was built in South Carolina in 1762 or 1779, possibly under another name. Between 1789 and 1799 she made six complete voyages as a whaler in the British southern whale fishery. Afterwards she sailed as a merchantman. She was last listed in 1809.
- Belisarius (1781 ship) was launched in Massachusetts in 1781. The British Royal Navy captured later that year and took her into service as HMS Bellisarius. She captured several American privateers, including one in a single ship action, before the Navy sold her in 1784. Her new owners sailed her as a merchantman between London and British Honduras. In 1787 she carried emigrants from London to Sierra Leone for the Committee for the Relief of the Black Poor, before returning to trading with Honduras. She was wrecked in September 1787 at Honduras.
- Belisarius, Victoria, late master, arrived at Bahia on 1 January 1823. She had left Mozambique with 300 captives but on the way to Rio de Janeiro the captives rose and killed the master and some of the crew. The frigate Constitution encountered her at sea and brought her into Bahia.
- Bellisarius (1795 ship) was launched in Sweden in 1783, possibly under another name. She started appearing in British registry in 1795, but was sunk in March 1796 in a collision.
