= Countess de Galvaez (1780 ship) =

History
- Name: Unknown
- Launched: 1800, America
- Renamed: Condessa de Galvaez (Countess de Galvaez) in 1784. (Note: On 12 July 1784, after 21 years of British government rule, Spain regained control of St. Augustine, Florida. The new Spanish viceroy Bernardo Vicente de Gálvez y Madrid, 1st Viscount of Galveston, 1st Count of Gálvez authorized a local plantation owner in St Augustine, Francis Philip Fatio, a British subject who adopted Spanish nationality at the time of the takeover, to trade with ports in the U.S. In gratitude, Fatio renamed one of his vessels Condessa de Gálvez in honour of the viceroy's wife.)
- Fate: Sold c.1785

Great Britain
- Name: Countess de Galvaez
- Owner: 1785:Mather & Co.; 1789:Morgan & Co.; 1794:Daniel Bennett
- Acquired: c.1785 by purchase
- Fate: Wrecked 1794

General characteristics
- Tons burthen: 200, or 208 (bm)
- Armament: 12 guns

Countess de Galvaez (or Countess de Galvez, or Countess of Galvez) was launched in 1780 in the Americas, probably under another name, and lengthened and rebuilt in 1785, when she assumed British registry. She then traded with Mobile, New Orleans, Pensacola, or more simply, the "Mississippi". From 1791 on she made one voyage as a whaler and one as a slave ship in the triangular trade in enslaved people. There is some confusion about her ownership in the period 1791–1794. She was lost in 1794 on her return to England from her slave-trading voyage.

== Career ==
Countess de Galvaez first appeared in Lloyd's Register in 1786 (Lloyd's Register was not published in 1785), with W. Reed, master, J. Mather, owner, and trade London–Pensacola. However, Lloyd's List shows Countess de Galvez, Reid, master, sailing from Gravesend on 10 April 1785, bound for Pensacola.

On 18 May 1788, Captain Redmayne of Minerva was sailing from Jamaica to Liverpool when she encountered Countess of Galvez, Reed, master. Countess was 12 days out of New Orleans and the day before had grounded on grounded on Mantanza Reef in nine feet of water. Reed had about 100 bales of hides thrown overboard and that lightened Countess enough that she was able to get over the reef. He reported that she had lost a great part of her sheathing but had started no leaks. On 4 June Countess, Reed, master, broke her journey from New Orleans to London by putting into New York for repairs. She was expected to resume her voyage later that month.

=== Whaling voyage ===
On 18 August 1791 Captain Henry Delano sailed Countess de Galvaez for the Pacific Ocean. (Earlier, Delano had been master of the whaler Lord Hawkesbury.) Countess arrived at Falmouth, from Peru, in November 1792. When she returned she brought news of some 19 whaling vessels that she had left off the coast of Peru in April.

There is some ambiguity about the ownership of Countess de Galvaez during her whaling voyage. The database of whaling voyages gives the owner as Daniel Bennett, but Lloyd's Register (see below) gives it as Mason & Co. Furthermore, one source states that Bennett only owned Countess in 1794, for one year.

It is not clear where Countess de Galvaez was in 1793. One source states that she was engaged in whaling, but there is no support for that assertion in Lloyd's List's ship arrival and departure data.

=== Enslaving voyage ===
Captain James Hoskins sailed Countess from London on 5 January 1794, bound for West Africa. Her owner was Daniel Bennett.

She commenced acquiring captives on 30 March, first at Cape Coast Castle and then at Anomabu. She left Africa on 21 April. Countess de Galvez, Hoskirg, master, stopped at St Vincent. She arrived at Jamaica on 5 June; there she landed 330 captives. It is not clear when she left Jamaica.

== Lloyd's Register ==
Year	Master	Owner	Trade	Notes
1789	W. Reed	Morgan & Co.	London–Mississippi	Lengthened and rebuilt 1785; damage repaired 1788
1790	Reed; B. French	P. Morgan	London–Mississippi	Lengthened and rebuilt 1785; damage repaired 1788
1791	French; H.Delano	Morgan	London–Mobile; London–Southern Fishery	Damage repaired 1788; repaired 1790
1792	H.Delano	P. Morgan	London–Southern Fishery	Damage repaired 1788; repaired 1790
1793	H.Delano	P. Morgan	London–Southern Fishery	Damage repaired 1788; repaired 1790
1794	Hoskins	Bennett	London–Southern Fishery	Damage repaired 1788; repaired 1790

== Loss ==
Countess of Galvez was driven ashore and wrecked at Shoeburyness, Essex, on or immediately before 10 October 1794. At the time she was returning to London from Jamaica. She was no longer listed in Lloyd's Register in 1795.

In 1794, 25 British enslaving ships were lost. At least two were lost on the homeward leg of their voyage. Still, during the period 1793 to 1807, war, rather than maritime hazards or resistance by the captives, was the greatest cause of vessel losses among British enslaving vessels.

== A second Countess of Galvez ==
Lloyd's List reported on 14 April 1795 that Countess of Galvez, Yarra, master, had arrived at Cadiz from Petersburg. Then on 6 January 1797, Lloyd's List reported that she had arrived at Plymouth. She had been sailing from Montevideo to Cadiz when the British transport Esther, returning to England from Gibraltar, had encountered and captured her. Her trade and capture suggest that this Countess was a Spanish ship.
