= Æolus (1783 ship) =

History

Denmark–Norway
- Name: Æolus
- Namesake: Aeolus
- Builder: Henrik Gerner, (Note: Henrik Gerner (1741–1787), was a major Danish sea-officer, shipbuilder, and engineer. Åbenrå (Apenrade))
- Laid down: 1781
- Launched: 1783
- Fate: Captured 1807

United Kingdom
- Name: Æolus
- Acquired: 1807-8
- Fate: Last listed in Lloyd's Register in 1815
- Notes: Two decks.; Sheathed with copper over boards.

General characteristics
- Tons burthen: 278, 289, or 290, or 310 (bm)
- Length: 107 ft 9 in (32.84 m) at the waterline (Danish fod and tomme)
- Propulsion: Sail
- Armament: West Indiaman:14 × 6-pounder guns (Danish weights); Whaler:12 guns; 1814:6 × 6-pounder guns ± 6 × 12-pounder carronades

Æolus, also spelt Aeolus (or frequently Eolus), was a snow sailing ship built in 1783 at Åbenrå in Denmark as a West Indiaman. The Royal Navy captured her in 1807. Buckle & Co. purchased her as a prize. In 1808-9 she transported convicts to Port Jackson, New South Wales. She was last listed in Lloyd's Register in 1816.

== Career ==
Æolus was built for merchant Mr. Butz of Butz & Partners for use as a West Indiaman. She was still owned by this partnership in 1807 before capture by the British.

HMS Royalist, Phosphorus, and Bloodhound shared in the prize money for the Danish ship Æolus, which they took on 19 August 1807, early in the Gunboat War between Britain and Denmark. She enters Lloyd's Register in 1808, where she is shown with Cooper, master.

Under the command of Robert Addie, she sailed from England in 1808 and arrived at Port Jackson on 26 January 1809. She had embarked 79 female convicts, none of whom died on the voyage. (Note: The Northern Midlands Council at Tasmania has constructed a convict trail with a brick for each vessel that transported convicts. The brick for Æolus states that she carried six female and 73 male convicts This is at variance with other records.) Most of the convicts were then sent to the Parramatta Female Factory.

Æolus left Port Jackson on 1 April bound for England. She was carrying a full load of whale oil from the whaler DuBuc, which had been condemned by survey at Hobart.

Æolus, E. Sindry, master, was still sailing in 1813. She had to put into Corunna in distress on her way from London to Bermuda. She discharged her cargo at Corunna.

The Register of Shipping for 1814 showed her with Sunday, master, Boyd & Co., owner, and trade London–Bermuda.

== Fate ==
The Register of Shipping last listed her in 1816; Lloyd's Register last listed her in 1815.
