= Glatton (1762 EIC ship) =

History

British East India Company
- Name: Glatton
- Owner: Richard Neave
- Builder: Wells, Deptford
- Launched: 17 November 1762
- Fate: Sold 1772

Great Britain
- Name: Lord Howe
- Namesake: Lord Howe
- Owner: Mather & Co.
- Acquired: 1772 by purchase
- Fate: Last listed 1781; probably foundered

General characteristics
- Tons burthen: 499, (Note: It was standard practice for some time for the EIC to declare a burthen of 499 tons, or fewer. By doing so the company avoided the expense of paying for a chaplain as then the law required for vessels of 500 tons or over.) or 676, or 720 (bm)
- Sail plan: Full-rigged ship
- Armament: 1778:14 × 9-pounder guns; 1780:24 × 9-pounder + 6 × 6-pounder guns

Glatton was launched as an East Indiaman. She made four voyages for the British East India Company (EIC) before her owners sold her in 1772. Her new owner, James Mather, renamed her Lord Howe and first deployed her to bring timber from North America to England. Mather then hired her out as a transport. She was last listed in 1782 and was probably the "ordinance storeship Lord Howe" that foundered in that year.

== Career ==
1st EIC voyage (1763–1764): Captain Richard Doveton sailed from Portsmouth on 7 March 1763, bound for the East Indies and China. Glatton reached Benkulen on 29 July, and Batavia on 6 November. She arrived at Whampoa anchorage on 30 January 1764. Homeward-bound, she crossed the Second Bar on 25 March, reached st Helena on 8 August, and arrived back at Long Reach on 15 November.

2nd EIC voyage (1765–1767): Captain Doveton sailed from the Downs on 26 December 1765, bound for Madras and China. Glatton reached the Cape on 27 March 1766, and Madras on 6 June. She arrived at Whampoa on 8 September. Homeward-bound, she crossed the Second Bar on 10 January 1767, reached St Helena on 21 April 1767, and arrived back at the Downs on 9 July.

3rd EIC voyage (1769–1770): Captain Doveton sailed from the Downs on 2 January 1769, bound for China. Glatton arrived at Whampoa on 12 July. Homeward-bound, she crossed the Second Bar on 29 November, reached St Helena on 20 February 1770, and arrived back at the Downs on 26 April.

4th EIC voyage (1771–1772): Captain Doveton sailed from Portsmouth on 6 February 1771, bound for China. Glatton reached Batavia on 20 June and arrived at Whampoa on 8 August. Homeward-bound, she crossed the Second Bar on 7 January 1772, reached St Helena on 11 April, and arrived at the Downs on 24 June.

Richard Neave sold Glatton in 1772.

Lord Howe (1772–1781): James Mather purchased Glatton and renamed her Lord Howe. Missing volumes of Lloyd's Register (LR) have resulted in Lord Howe first appearing in LR in 1776.

Year	Master	Owner	Trade	Source
1776	Al.Oswald	J.Mather & Co.	London transport	LR; thorough repair 1768

On 10 May 1776 the transport Lord Howe, Oswald, master, was among the transports that brought troops and supplies for the relief of Quebec.

One source has the Americans seizing the transport Lord Howe in Boston on 17 June 1776 when she arrived there after the British had evacuated the town. The vessel seized appears to have been a different Lord Howe, as the former Glatton continued to appear in LR with updated data.

While Lord Howe was at Quebec she was apparently hired for a time as an armed ship, with the Royal Navy appointing a naval officer to command her. Commander Thomas Pringle commanded the "Lord Howe armed ship" from 10 May to 25 November. However, he was also appointed to command the British naval forces on Lake Champlain. These forces succeeded on 11 and 13 November 1776 in destroying almost the entire American flotilla there.

Year	Master	Owner	Trade	Source
1778	Al.Oswald	J.Mather & Co.	London transport	LR; thorough repair 1768
1780	Al.Oswald; B.Francis	J.Mather & Co.	London transport	LR; thorough repair 1778
1781	B.Francis	J.Mather & Co.	London transport	LR; thorough repair 1778 & good repair 1780

== Fate ==
The "Ordinance storeship Lord Howe", from London, foundered on 17 October 1781 at 45°26′N 41°00′W. The crew were saved.

Lord Howe (ex-Glatton) was last listed in 1781.
