= Harriot (1797 ship) =

History

Great Britain
- Name: Harriot
- Builder: Spain
- Launched: 1794
- Acquired: 1797 by purchase of a prize
- Captured: 1809

General characteristics
- Tons burthen: 217, or 226, or 227 (bm)
- Complement: 1797: 25; 1803 *1803: 22
- Armament: 1797: 14 × 6-pounder guns; 1803: 8 × 6-pounder guns + 2 swivel guns; 1810: 2 × 4-pounder guns (LR); 1810: 10 × 12-pounder carronades (Register of Shipping)

Harriot (or Harriet) was launched in Spain in 1794, almost surely under another name, and taken in prize in 1797. She made two voyages as a London-based slave ship in the triangular trade in enslaved people. Under new ownership, she then made three voyages as a whaler in the British southern whale fishery. A privateer captured her as she was returning from her third whale-hunting voyage but the British Royal Navy recaptured her. After her recapture she became a merchantman. The Spanish seized her in the Pacific; she was condemned at Lima, Peru in March-April 1809, as a smuggler.

== Slave ship ==
Harriot first appeared in Lloyd's Register in 1797.

Year	Master	Owner	Trade	Source
1797	J.Clark	Parry & Co.	London–Africa	LR

1st voyage transporting enslaved people (1797–1798): Captain James Clark (or Clark), acquired a letter of marque on 15 September 1797. (Note: Clark was the 13th leading slave ship captain of the 1785 to 1807 period. Between 1791 and 1806 he made nine voyages as a captain of slave ships, for five owners, in six vessels, first from London and then from Liverpool.) He sailed from London on 4 October, bound for the Bight of Benin. In 1797, 104 vessels sailed from English ports, bound to Africa to acquire and transport captives; 12 of these vessels sailed from London.

Harriot started acquiring captives on 27 November. She acquired captives in three places: Batoa, Popo, and Keta. Harriot departed Africa on 2 April 1798. She arrived at St Vincent on 2 May. She had embarked with 346 captives and she arrived with 339, for a 2% mortality rate. She sailed for London on 2 July and arrived there on 14 August.

After the passage of the Slave Trade Act 1788 (Dolben's Act), masters received a bonus of £100 for a mortality rate of under 2%; the ship's surgeon received £50. For a mortality rate between two and three per cent, the bonus was halved. There was no bonus if mortality exceeded 3%.

2nd voyage transporting enslaved people (1798–1799): Captain Clark sailed from London on 21 October 1798. In 1798, 104 vessels sailed from English ports, bound to Africa to acquire and transport captives; 8 of these vessels sailed from London. This was the largest number of vessels to sail from England in the period 1795–1804, and the smallest number to sail from London.

Harriot acquired captives at Anomabu, and arrived at Demerara on 20 June 1799 with 350 captives.

== Whaler ==
LR only caught up in its 1802 issue with Harriet's move from trading in captives to whaling.

Year	Master	Owner	Trade	Source
1802	J.Clark; Chase	Parry; Mather & Co.	London–Africa; London–Southern Fishery	LR

1st whaling voyage (1799–1801): Captain L. Chase (or Chace) sailed Harriet in 1799 and returned on 12 February 1801.

2nd whaling voyage (1801–1803): Captain L. (or Samuel Chase) sailed from London in 1801, bound for Walvis Bay. Harriet was reported to have been at Walvis Bay in August 1801. Between 10 July 1802 and 20 August she was at Port Jackson. By September 1802 she was at New Zealand. She returned to England on 28 June 1803.

3rd whaling voyage (1803-1805): Captain Samuel Chase was Harriet's captain initially, but died at some point. Captain Thaddeus Coffin acquired a letter of marque on 20 August 1803. Harriet sailed from London in October 1803 for the Pacific. Harriet, Coffin, master, was at Chile in March 1804 and then sailed from Peru to New Zealand, where she was by October 1804. Harriet was at Port Jackson between 24 April and 29 May 1805. She had come from the fisheries and was returning to them. As Harriot was returning from Port Jackson to London a Spanish privateer captured her, but HMS Dryad recaptured her and sent her into Waterford. Harriot, Coffin, master, finally returned to Gravesend on 24 December 1805.

== Merchantman ==
Year	Master	Owner	Trade	Source
1806	T.Coffin; Glasspoole	Mathers	South Seas–Cork	LR

Captain Glasspoole sailed on a voyage from Cork. One source classified the voyage as a whaling voyage, though that attribution appears to be more on the basis of the destination than anything else; at the time some British vessels did sail to the Pacific coast of South America for trading purposes.

Year	Master	Owner	Trade	Source
1807	Glasspoole	Mathers	London–Buenos Aires	LR
1808	Glasspoole; Starling	Mather; Fenn & Co.	London–Buenos Aires; London–Surinam	LR
1809	Starling; M'Hendrick	Fenn & Co. Gwin & Co.	London–Surinam	LR
1810	M'Hendrick	Gwin & Co.	London–South Seas	LR
1810	M'Hendrick	Gwynone & Co.	London–South Seas	Register of Shipping (RS)

== Fate ==
At some point Captain James Porter replaced M'Hendrick in command of Harriet. As with the voyage to the South Seas, Clayton classified the voyage as a whaling voyage, though it was not necessarily so.

Lloyd's List reported in April 1810 that Harriet, Porter, master, had been taken and brought into Lima, where she was condemned.

On 12 August 1809, the brig Rey Fernando VII found the British ship Harriet in the anchorage at Lengua de Vaca. The Spaniards found items and hidden silver, leading them to suspect smuggling. Rey Fernando VII took Harriet to Callao, where they arrived on the 27th. The court there, or at Lima, declared Harriet a legitimate prize.
