= Cornwall (1794 ship) =

History

Great Britain
- Name: Cornwall
- Owner: 1794:Marylees; 1798:John Mangles & Thomas Blyth; 1810:Henry & Co.; 1815:Capt. & Co.; 1817:Dunbar; 1818:Truscott; 1819:Tulsee Monackjee
- Launched: 1794, Plymouth
- Fate: Last listed in 1824.

General characteristics
- Tons burthen: 400, or 401, or 407, or 423, or 425 or 450(bm)
- Length: 116 ft 6 in (35.5 m)
- Beam: 20 ft (6.1 m)
- Complement: 1797:30; 1803:30; 1809:35; 1810 May:35; 1810 November:35
- Armament: 1794:2 × 6-pounder guns; 1797:12 × 12&6-pounder guns + 2 swivel guns; 1803:12 × 12-pounder guns; 1809:16 × 9&6-pounder guns; 1810 May:16 × 9&6-pounder guns; 1810 November:16 × 9&6-pounder guns; 1810:4 × 6-pounder guns + 12 × 9-pounder carronades

Cornwall was launched in 1794 as a West Indiaman. In a little more than three years later she had left on the first of three whaling voyages to the Southern Whale Fishery. On her first whaling voyage she captured a Spanish ship and fought off a French privateer. After her third whaling voyage Cornwall returned to the West Indies trade. Around 1817 new owners sent her to India where a Parsi merchant purchased her. She traded in the Persian Gulf and the Indian Ocean, and also participated as a transport in a naval expedition to the Persian Gulf. She was last listed in 1824.

== Career ==
Cornwall entered Lloyd's Register in 1794 with Johnston, master, J. Marylees, owner, and trade London–Jamaica. Lloyd's Register for 1797 showed Cornwall's master changing from M. Johnston to T. Blyth, and her trade from London–Jamaica to London-South Seas. Her owner was J. Mangles.

=== Whaler ===
==== First whaling voyage (1798–1801) ====
Captain Thomas Blyth acquired a letter of marque on 28 November 1797. He sailed from England in 1798, bound for the Pacific Ocean. Cornwall stopped at Port Jackson on 2 July. She had come via the Cape of Good Hope and stopped to refit. She left on 27 August for New Zealand.

She was reported to have been on the west coast of America early 1799. At Cabo Blanco, Peru, she and another whaler, Kingston, assisted by Sally, captured Nostra Senora de Bethlehem, which had been sailing from Callao to Guayaquil. A prize crew from Cornwall under the command of Meather, Cornwall's second mate, brought Nostra Senora de Bethlehem into Port Jackson on 24 April 1799. (Note: On 1 May 1799, the Vice admiralty court condemned Nostra Senora de Bethlehem and her cargo. Captain William Hingston, who had come to Port Jackson as master of the convict transport Hillsborough, purchased her. He renamed her Hunter, and sailed her to Bengal where the authorities arrested her.)

Cornwall returned to England on 8 January 1801. As she was 25 leagues west of Scilly. on the night of 27 December she encountered a 20-gun French privateer. In the ensuing engagement Cornwall took many shots to her hull. By the time the French privateer sailed off Cornwall had eight feet of water in her hold and was quite water-logged. Lloyd's List reported that Cornwall had been in company with Resolution, Irish, master, and William. They had left Peru together and they arrived at Falmouth on the 28th. The engagement had lasted five hours.

==== Second whaling voyage (1798–1801) ====
Captain Blyth sailed from England on 14 April 1801 for the Brazil Banks. Cornwall was at St Helena on 19 September 1801, and off the coast of Brazil on 9 December. She called at Rio de Janeiro. By March 1802 she was at the Brazil Banks with 2200 barrels of whale oil. She returned to England on 20 July 1802.

==== Third whaling voyage (1802–1805) ====
Blythe sailed from England on 26 November 1802, bound for the Pacific. At the time shhe was valued at £8,500. While Cornwall was away, war with France resumed and Blythe received a letter of marque on 29 June 1803. In September she was in the Pacific, and in March 1804 she was "all well" there. Homeward bound, she left St Helena on 10 September 1804 in company with Lady Castlereagh and the whaler Ocean. She arrived back in England on 13 January 1805.

=== Merchantman ===
The Register of Shipping for 1806 showed Cornwall with Campbell, master, and trade London–Jamaica. In 1809, her master changed from Campbell to Peat, though her owner was still J. Mangles and her trade London–Jamaica. Captain John Peat acquired a letter of marque on 22 September 1809, and again on 13 November 1810. In between, Captain James Shand had acquired one on 3 May 1810, indicating that either he had been briefly, or had intend to be Cornwall's master.

Year	Master	Owner	Trade	Notes and source
1810	Peat; J. Shand	Henry & Co.	London–Jamaica	Register of Shipping (RS)
1815	Laughton	Capt. & Co.	London–Hayti	RS
1818	Jordaine; Harris	Dunbar; Truscott	London–Cape of Good Hope; London–India	RS

The British East India Company (EIC) in 1814 lost its monopoly on the trade between Britain and India. Thereafter, non-EIC vessels could legally trade with Mauritius and India under a license from the EIC.

On 24 January 1817 a King's Yard lighter ran into Cornwall, Jordan, master, in the Gull Stream as Cornwall was setting out for Isle of France. The accident caused so much damage that Cornwall had to return to the Thames for repairs. On 1 January 1818 there was a fog as Cornwall, Jordan, master, was returning to London from Isle of France. She ran on shore at Blyth Sand, 20 miles from Gravesend, but was gotten off without damage and she arrived at Gravesend on the 6th.

On 7 June 1818, Cornwall, C. Harris, master, sailed for Bombay.

=== Country ship ===
At some point in 1819 the Parsi merchant Tulsee Munchajee purchased Cornwall. It is not clear whether he appointed William Richardson Cornwall's captain or whether Richardson was already master.

Cornwall sailed from Bombay on 8 April 1819. She was at Muscat on 26 April, where she took on a cargo. She delivered some at Bushire, which she reached on 14 May, and between 23 May and 2 June she delivered 676 bags of rice to Bahrain. She was at Matrah on 13 July and returned to Bombay on 24 July. Captain William Richardson, Cornwall's master, reported that at Bahrain the main topic of conversation was the expected British attack on the pirates in the Gulf.

In late 1819 the government appointed Captain Francis Augustus Collier of HMS Liverpool to command the naval portion of a joint navy-army punitive expedition against the Joasmi (Al Qasimi) pirates at Ras al-Khaimah in the Persian Gulf. The naval force consisted of HMS Liverpool, Eden, Curlew, several EIC cruisers including HCS Aurora, and a number of gun and mortar boats. Eighteen transports, most merchant vessels registered at Bombay, carried troops and supplies. Cromwell was one of the transports.

After destroying Ras al-Khaimah, the British then spent the rest of December and early January moving up and down the coast destroying forts and vessels. On 31 December Cornwall, James Richardson, master and Tulsee Munchajee, owner, sailed to Dwarka. She then carried General Lionel Smith and to embark elements of the 65th Regiment of Foot to Coogeram on the Arabian coast. The capture and destruction of the fortifications and ships at Ras al-Khaimah was a massive blow for the pirates in the Persian Gulf region. British casualties were minimal.

The India Office and Burma Office List for 1821 shows Cornwall with Wm. Richardson, master, and Tulsee Monackjee owner.

On 20 March 1823 Cornwall, Richardson, master, became stuck on a bank off Cape Aden. She was sailing from Mocha to England with a cargo of coffee. She sustained considerable damage and put into Bombay on 25 May to refit.

== Fate ==
An 1824 listing of vessels belonging to Bombay showed Cornwall with Richardson, master, and Tulsee Monackjee owner. The 1825 volume no longer lists her.
