= Alexander (1801 ship Shields) =

History

United Kingdom
- Name: Alexander
- Owner: F. Hurry & Co., Howdon
- Launched: 1801
- Fate: Wrecked 8 October 1808

General characteristics
- Type: Full-rigged ship
- Tons burthen: 301 (bm)
- Propulsion: Sail
- Complement: 32 men
- Armament: 8 × 18-pounder carronades

Alexander was a 301-ton merchant vessel launched at Shields in 1801. She became a whaler and made a voyage to New Zealand and the South Seas whale fisheries for Hurry & Co. She was wrecked while outbound from Liverpool in October 1808.

== Career ==
Alexander entered Lloyd's Register in 1801, with owner Hurry & Co., W. Sharp, master, changing to T.Robson, and trade, London-Baltic. In 1802, her master changed to R. Rhodes and her trade changed to southern whale fishery. She was valued at £7,200.

Captain Robert Rhodes sailed Alexander from Britain on 18 January 1802, for the New South Wales fishery. (Note: Rhodes had been to the New South Wales fisheries and the South Atlantic as mate and then master of Hillsborough. He had returned to Britain in April 1801.) She was at Isle of Mayo on 10 March, and St Iago, both Cape Verde islands, on 18 March. She arrived at Rio de Janeiro on 20 April. There she underwent calefaction. By October she was at Norfolk Island. In March 1803, she was in New Zealand, but by May she was back at Norfolk Island. While Alexander was at the Bay of Islands, New Zealand, a 16-year old Māori named Teina joined her as a sailor.

Alexander was reported to have arrived at Port Jackson on 1 June 1803, having arrived there from New Zealand with "oil". The oil consisted of 50 tons of spermaceti oil. At Norfolk, Alexander picked up 18,535lbs. of pork, salted there, and brought it back to Port Jackson on behalf and account of the Government of New South Wales. At Port Jackson, Teina, the first Māori recorded to have left New Zealand since 1793, stayed with Governor King. Alexander left Port Jackson on 19 September, to return Teina to New Zealand. Governor King had given him gifts to take back with him, including pigs. When they arrived in New Zealand Alexander recruited a second Māori, Maki. He and Teina then remained sailors on board Alexander for the next three years until she returned to Britain. (Teina died there but Maki survived.) (Note: The first Māori that arrived in England was Moehanga on the whaler Ferret.)

Alexander was again at New Zealand in December, and was reported to have been off the coast in April–May 1804. By May, she again visited Norfolk Island. She returned to Port Jackson where she stayed in June–July. She was at Hobart Town and in the Derwent on 26 August, when Ocean arrived with the settlers she was bringing from the failed colony at Port Phillip. Alexander was in the Derwent gathering whale oil from the "black whale". Her chief officer was Jørgen Jørgensen who claimed to have harpooned the first whale taken in the Derwent. She was still there in September, but in New Zealand in November. She returned to Port Jackson in December.

She stayed at Port Jackson until 27 February 1805, when she is recorded as having sailed for England. While at Port Jackson, Rhodes took on the Danish adventurer Jørgen Jørgensen as mate. Alexander actually sailed first to Norfolk Island, and then New Zealand, before sailing for Cape Horn. She was forced to return to Otaheite and was reported there in June–July 1805.

Alexander was at St Catherine's, off Brazil, from December 1805 to January 1806.

The whaler Cyrus reported that Alexander was at St Helena on 26 March 1806, having come from New Holland with 1200 barrels sperm oil. Alexander returned to Britain on 27 June 1806, with 105 tuns of sperm oil, 105 tuns of whale oil. 70 tons of whale bone, 14,000 seal skins, and 22½ tuns of elephant seal oil.

Unfortunately, oil prices had dropped and Rhodes found himself financially embarrassed. He was unable to pay his crew and he himself went to King's Bench debtors' prison. Teina fell ill and died. Maki survived, only to be crimped and sold to the master of another vessel.

== Loss ==
Lloyd's Register continued to carry Alexander, with Rhodes, master, until 1808. She was no longer present in 1809.

The Register of Shipping (RS) for 1809, showed Alexander with G.White, master, Edwards, owner, and trade London transport.

There was a severe gale at Liverpool on 8 October 1808. Alexander, Wade, master, which had sailed for the Brazils the day before, put back and sailed some miles up the River Mersey to the point where she was wrecked. Her masts were cut away and she was full of water. Three other vessels were reported to have wrecked also.
