= Kingston (1780 ship) =

History

Great Britain
- Name: Kingston
- Owner: 1780:J. Collard; 1798:D. Bennett; 1803: Alexander & John Gibbon; Matthew Swain
- Builder: Bristol
- Launched: 1780
- Fate: Last listed 1819

General characteristics
- Tons burthen: 287, or 293, or 300 (bm)
- Length: 95 ft 0 in (29.0 m)
- Beam: 27 ft 3 in (8.3 m)
- Complement: 1800:26; 1803:18
- Armament: 1780:20 × 9-pounder + 4 × 6-pounder guns; 1799:2 × 4-pounder guns + 10 × 9-pounder carronades; 1800:12 × 9&4-pounder cannons; 1815:8 × 6-pounder carronades
- Notes: Two decks and three masts

Kingston was launched at Bristol in 1780 as a West Indiaman. From 1798 she made ten voyages as a whaler. Somewhat unusually, on her first voyage she participated in the capture of a Spanish merchant ship. She then briefly sailed between England and Quebec, and was last listed in 1819.

== Career ==
Kingston first appeared in Lloyd's Register in 1780 with J. Fowler, master, J. Collard, owner, and trade Bristol–Jamaica. For the next 18 or so years she continued to trade with the West Indies.

Year	Master	Owner	Trade	Notes
1786	J.Fowler; G.Mitchell	Hibbert & Co.	London–Jamaica	
1790	J.Douglas; J.Stroud	Hibbert & Co.	London–Jamaica	
1795	J. Bowen	Mestairs	London−Tobago	Repairs in 1793
1798	J.Gibson; C. Clark	Brown & Co.	London–Antigua; London–Southern Fishery	Repairs in 1793
1799	C. Clark	Bennett	London–Southern Fishery	Repairs in 1793

In 1798 the ship-owner Daniel Bennett acquired Kingston.

1st whaling voyage (1798-1799): Captain Charles Clark sailed from England on 11 March 1798, bound for the Pacific Ocean. In May she was at Rio de Janeiro replenishing her water and food.

Kingston was reported to have been on the west coast of America early 1799. At Cabo Blanco, Peru, she and another whaler, Cornwall, assisted by Sally, captured Nostra Senora de Bethlehem, which had been sailing from Callao to Guayaquil. A prize crew from Cornwall under the command of Meather, Cornwall's second mate, brought Nostra Senora de Bethlehem into Port Jackson on 24 April 1799. (Note: On 1 May 1799, the Vice admiralty court condemned Nostra Senora de Bethlehem and her cargo.)

Clark returned to England on 12 November 1799. She was also mentioned in the Protection Lists.

2nd whaling voyage (1800-1801): Captain Thomas Dennis acquired a letter of marque on 15 January 1800. Kingston was to sail in company with Elligood, which too was a Bennett ship. They were to sail on a speculative voyage to New Holland for whales. They were then to examine King George Sound, proceed to Shark Bay and the north-west coast, and return via Madagascar and southern Africa. The voyage would require them to infringe on the British East India Company's (EIC) monopoly on navigation east of the Cape of Good Hope. They received permission from the EIC's Court of Directors on 16 February. Kingston sailed on 19 February.

Elligood and Kingston arrived in Cape Town on 5 May 1800. The two vessels did some whaling off the African coast and then turned east, cruising off Western Australia from 9 August to 22 December. On 27 August they were at King George Sound. There, at the entrance to Oyster Harbour, Western Australia (34°59′37.9″S 117°56′39.8″E, Dixson made a small garden and left a copper plate engraved "Aug. 27 1800. Chr Dixson, ship Elligood". Late in 1801 Matthew Flinders found the plate on his way along the southern coast of Australia to Port Jackson.

Kingston returned to England on 4 December 1801. In 1802 Kingston was valued at £6,000.

3rd whaling voyage (1802): Captain Tristam Bunker sailed from England on 9 February 1802. He returned on 16 December.

In 1803 Danniel Bennett sold Kingston to Alexander and John Gibbon, and Matthew Swain.

4th whaling voyage (1803–1804): Captain Matthew Swain sailed on 18 June 1803. Kingston was at Saint Helena in May 1804. She returned on 13 July 1804.

5th whaling voyage (1804–1806): Captain Matthew Swain sailed on 27 September 1804, bound for the Isle of Desolation. Kingston was there on 1 April 1805, "All Well". Kingston returned to London on 15 June with 1600 barrels of "black oil".

6th whaling voyage (1806–1808): Captain Thomas Richards sailed from England on 21 August 1806. Kingston was at Boa Vista in October. Kingston returned on 25 May 1808.

7th whaling voyage (1808–1809): Captain Thomas Richards sailed from England on 5 August 1808. He returned on 13 September 1809.

8th whaling voyage (1809–1811): Captain Thomas Richards sailed from England on 20 November 1809. He returned on 16 April 1811. Kingston underwent a "good repair" that year, presumably after her return.

9th whaling voyage (1811–1813): Captain Granville (or William Glanville) sailed from England in 1811. He returned on 18 May 1813. In 1813 Kingston underwent a "good repair".

Transport: The Register of Shipping for 1815 shows Kingston with Richardson, master, and trade London transport.

10th whaling voyage (1815-c.1817): Captain Joplin or John Jopling sailed from England on 21 December 1815. At some point her master changed to James Young.

The Register of Shipping for 1818 showed Kingston's master changing from J. Topplen to Young, and her trade from London−Southern Fishery to London−Quebec.

== Fate ==
Kingston was last listed in 1819. Lloyd's Register and the Register of Shipping both showed her master as J.Young, her owner as Gibbon, and her trade as London–Quebec.
