= Barbara (1771 ship) =

History

Great Britain
- Builder: Philadelphia
- Launched: 1771
- Captured: Late 1800

General characteristics
- Tons burthen: 241, or 260 (bm)
- Complement: 28
- Armament: 12 × 6-pounder guns + 2 swivel guns

Barbara was launched in Philadelphia in 1771 and came to England circa 1787. She initially sailed as a West Indiaman, but then between 1788 and 1800 made five complete voyages as a whaler. The Spanish captured her late in 1800 in the Pacific during her sixth whaling voyage.

== Career ==
Barbara first appeared in Lloyd's Register (LR) in 1787 with W.Cruden, master, Hankey, owner, and trade London–Grenada. She had been lengthened in 1777, and had undergone a good repair in 1782. This information may have been slightly stale as there are numerous mentions in Lloyd's List (LL) in 1785–1786) of a Barbera, Clark, master, sailing between London and Grenada. In 1787–1788 there are also reports of Barbera, Cruden, master, sailing between London and Grenada.

1st whaling voyage (1789–1790): Barbara appeared in LR for 1789 with B. Clark, master, Lucas & Co., owner, and trade London–Southern Fishery. Captain Benjamin Clark sailed from London on 4 February 1788. When Barbara returned she was carrying 124 tuns of whale oil and 100 cwt of whale bone.

2nd whaling voyage (1790–1791): Captain Stephen Skiff sailed in 1790. Barbara returned on 13 January 1791. She had 1400 barrels of right whale oil aboard when she was at Saint Helena in December 1790 on her way home.

3rd whaling voyage (1791–1793): On 21 July 1791 Captain Skiff and Barbara were at 10°30′N 13°20′W, bound for the Le Maire Strait. She had passed Brava, Cape Verde two days earlier.Busbridge arrived at London on 16 August 1792 having left her convoy at the Scilly Isles a few days earlier, a convoy that included Barbara, on her way home. Barbara returned on 22 August 1793 with 113 tuns of oil.

4th whaling voyage (1793–1795): Captain Skiff sailed again in 1793 for Peru. Barbara returned to London on 25 August 1795, with 60 tuns of sperm oil, 90 tuns of whale oil, + 60 cwt of whale bone.

5th whaling voyage (1796–1798): Captain Skiff sailed in 1796, bound for the Pacific. Barbara returned to London on 3 July 1798, via Cork.

6th whaling voyage (1798–loss): Captain Jethro Gardner acquired a letter of marque on 3 September 1798. He sailed from London on 20 September 1798, bound for the Pacific. In December she stopped in at Rio de Janeiro for food, water, and replenishment.

== Fate ==
The Spanish captured Barbara, Gardner, master, in 1800 and carried her into Guayaquil. She was sailing from the South Seas fishery to London. She was captured in February 1800 after sailors from the Spanish packet San Jose killed the captain and two officers.
