= Great Tobago Island =

Island in the British Virgin Islands

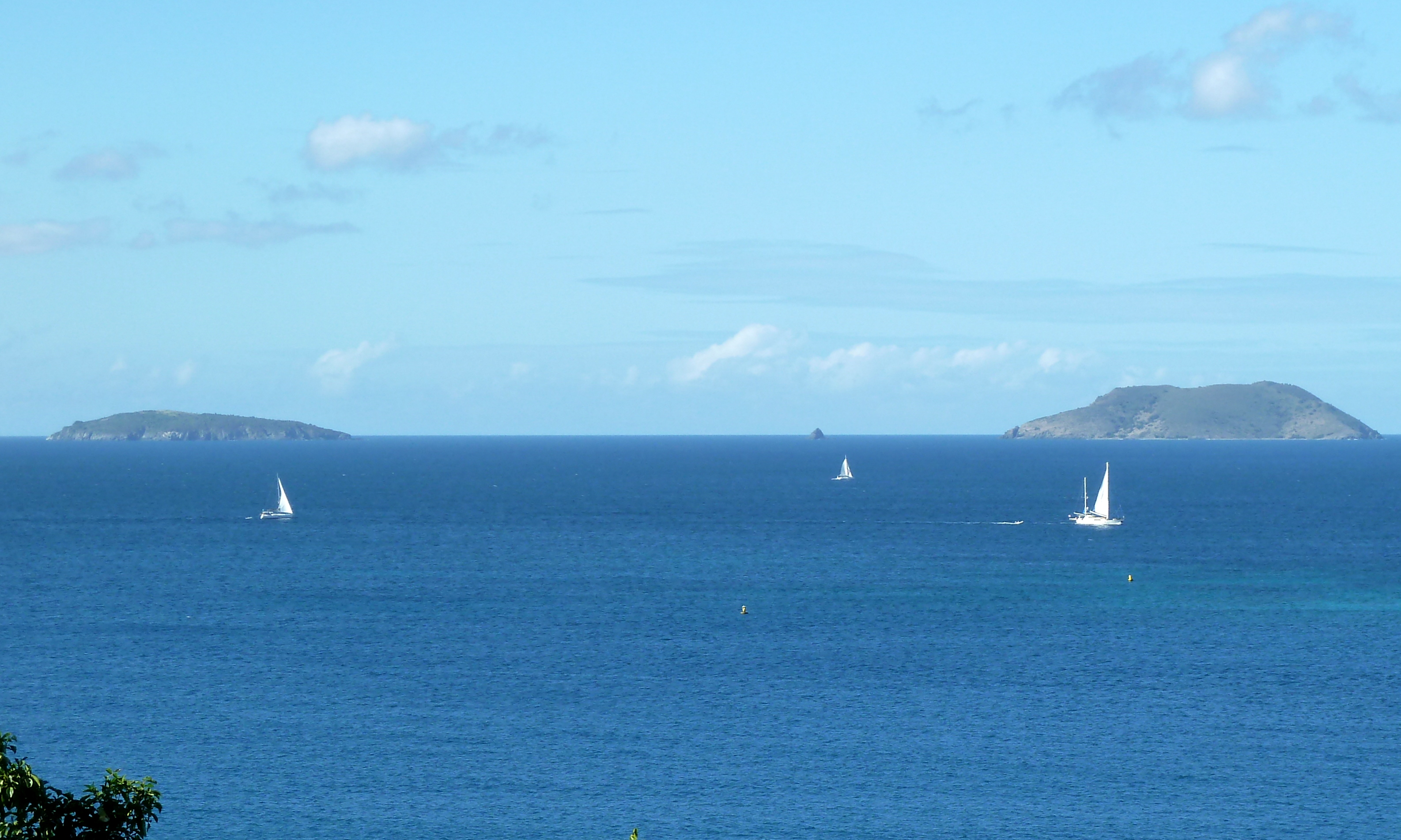
- Little Tobago (left) and Great Tobago (right), as seen from St. John

- The location of Great Tobago Island within the British Virgin Islands

- Location within British Virgin Islands Location within the Caribbean

Geography
- Location: Caribbean Sea
- Coordinates: 18°26′45″N 64°49′30″W
- Archipelago: Virgin Islands

Administration
- United Kingdom
- British Overseas Territory: British Virgin Islands

Additional information
- Time zone: AST (UTC-4)
- ISO code: VG

Great Tobago is an uninhabited island of the British Virgin Islands in the Caribbean, located, along with sister island Little Tobago, approximately six miles west of Jost Van Dyke. The Tobagos are the westernmost of the British Virgin Islands. At 210 acres (85 ha) in size, it is surrounded by steep cliffs that also extend below the water. Since the 1990s, Great Tobago, Little Tobago islands, and nearby Mercurious and Watson Rocks are protected as part of the National Parks Trust.

== Environment ==
Great Tobago has been designated an Important Bird Area (IBA) by BirdLife International. It contains the Caribbean's third largest population of nesting seabirds, including magnificent frigatebirds, white-tailed tropicbirds, roseate terns, brown pelicans, laughing gulls, brown boobies and other species. The island was also populated by goats for many years.

There are over fifteen scuba diving sites. Although it is legal to snorkel and dive around the island, it is illegal to anchor, because all potential anchoring locations are coral reefs that would be destroyed by an anchor. Large fines can occur if you violate this no-anchor zone, which is frequently patrolled by the BVI Marine Police.

In the 1990s, a company from the neighboring United States Virgin Islands floated a proposal to build a waste dump on Great Tobago Island, but the proposal was turned down by the British Virgin Islands government.
