= Tobago (1793 ship) =

UK merchantman, whaler, and slave ship (1793–1802)

History

France
- Launched: 1790
- Captured: 1793

Great Britain
- Name: Tobago
- Namesake: Tobago
- Owner: 1793:J. Sampson; 1795:Mather & Co.; 1800:Thornborough or Throckmorton
- Port of registry: London
- Acquired: By purchase of a prize 1793
- Fate: Abandoned or condemned in 1802

General characteristics
- Tons burthen: 271, or 293, or 294 (bm)
- Sail plan: Full-rigged ship
- Crew: 1793: 16; 1800:30
- Armament: 1793:4 × 6-pounder guns, or 4 × 3-pounder guns + 4 swivel guns; 1800:16 × 6-pounder guns, + 4 swivel guns

Tobago was a ship launched in 1790. She came into British hands in 1793 and was probably a prize taken immediately after the outbreak of the French Revolutionary Wars in early 1793. She traded with Tobago for several years before new owners purchased her for whaling. She made two whaling voyages to the East Coast of Africa before her owners sold her to new owners. She then made two voyages as a slave ship. She was abandoned or condemned in 1802 after having delivered her captives on her second such voyage.

== Career ==
Tobago first appears in Lloyd's Register in 1793 with owner J. Sampson, master T. Seward, and trade London-Tobago. Captain Thomas Montague received a letter of marque for Tobago on 13 November 1793.

J. Mather purchased Tobago in 1795. (James, John, and Thomas Mather owned a total of 29 whaling vessels at one time or another.)

Lloyd's Register for 1805 shows ownership changing from Seward to Mather, and her trade changing from London-Tobago to London-South Seas. In 1795 Captain William Fitch sailed to Delagoa Bay to hunt whales. She was reported "all well" at Trinidad on 31 December 1795. She returned to Britain on 28 March 1797.

Later that year she left again for the East Coast of Africa under the command of Captain Thomas Melville. Outward bound, she called in at Rio de Janeiro in November for provisions. On 28 May 1799 Tobago sailed from Saint Helena with the returning East India fleet, but parted from them on 16 June. She arrived back in the Thames by 21 July 1799.

Mather sold Tobago circa 1800. The change of ownership appears in the 1801 issue of Lloyd's Register, which shows her ownership changing to Thornborough and her trade to London-Africa. The same entry shows her armament increasing to sixteen 6-pounder guns, and gives the name of her master as W. Markay. However, on 24 May 1800 Captain William Mecham received a letter of marque for Tobago, of 293 tons (bm), and sixteen 6-pounder guns.

Tobago, with owner Throckmorton and master, William Mechan (or Mecham), then made two slave voyages carrying slaves from the Gold Coast to British Guiana. (Note: Mechan had been captain of Experiment on two slave trading voyages, one in 1794 and the second in 1795. The French had captured Metchan and Experiment in 1795.) On her first slave trading voyage, Tobago sailed from London 12 June 1800. She gathered slaves at Cape Coast Castle and delivered 282 to Demerara on 24 February 1801. Tobago, Mechan, master, was reported to have sailed from Demerara on 3 April 1801. She arrived back in London on 30 May 1801.

On her second voyage, Tobago left London on 2 July 1801 and arrived off the Gold Coast on 17 October. She gathered slaves at Cape Coast Castle and Wiamba. She arrived at Demerara 4 February 1802 with 291 slaves.

On 26 April 1802, Tobago, Michan, master, sailing from Demerara, put into Port Royal, Jamaica, in a leaky state.

== Fate ==
Tobago was abandoned or condemned for unseaworthiness.

War, not maritime hazards or slave resistance, was the greatest cause of vessel losses among British slave vessels between 1793 and 1807. In 1802, only 12 British slave ships were lost as the Peace of Amiens meant that hostilities had ended in early 1802, and to some degree from October 1801. None of the 12 were lost on the homeward bound leg of their voyages. One, possibly Tobago, was "unspecified".

Tobago is last listed in the Register of Shipping for 1806 with Meecham, master. She is last listed in Lloyd's Register for 1807, with W. Mackay, master, Throckmorton, owner, and trade London-Africa.
