= Bellisarius (1762 ship) =

History

Great Britain
- Name: Bellisarius
- Launched: 1762, or 1779, (Note: Lloyd's Register gave the year of launch as 1762. The Register of Shipping amended the year to 1779.) South Carolina
- Fate: Last listed 1809

General characteristics
- Tons burthen: 300, or 326 (bm)
- Complement: 26
- Armament: 1793: 10 × 6&4-pounder guns; 1796: 8 × 4-pounder guns; 1799: 4 × 4-pounder guns; 1805: 4 × 6-pounder guns

Bellisarius was built in South Carolina in 1762 or 1779, possibly under another name. Between 1789 and 1799 she made six complete voyages as a whaler in the British southern whale fishery. Afterwards she sailed as a merchantman. She was last listed in 1809.

== Career ==
Bellisarius first appeared in Lloyd's Register (LR) in 1789. James Mather purchased her to use her as a whaler.

Year	Master	Owner	Trade	Source & notes
1789	Anderson	James Mather	London–Southern fishery	LR; lengthened 1777 and good repair 1788

1st whaling voyage (1789–1790): Captain Thomas Anderson sailed from London on 29 June 1789. Bellisarius returned on 26 April 1790. Bellisarius was mentioned in the Protection List in 1790.

2nd whaling voyage (1790–1791): Captain Anderson sailed on 29 July 1790. Bellisarius returned on 27 September 1791.

3rd whaling voyage (1791–1792): Captain Anderson sailed on 11 November 1791, bound for Peru. Bellisarius let the coast of Peru in November 1792. She returned to England on 2 June 1793 with 148 tuns of sperm oil and 25 tuns of whale oil.

After the outbreak of war with France, Captain Thomas Anderson acquired a letter of marque on 29 August 1793.

4th whaling voyage (1793–1795): Captain Anderson sailed from England in 1793. In December 1793, she called in at Rio de Janeiro needing food. Bellisarius returned from Peru on 29 November 1795 with 107 tuns of sperm oil, 98 tuns of whale oil, 75 cwt of whale bone, and 3800 seal skins.

Year	Master	Owner	Trade	Source & notes
1796	T.Anderson; W.Dagg	James Mather	London–Southern fishery	LR; lengthened 1777, good repair 1788, & new deck 1791

6th whaling voyage (1797–1799): Captain William Dagg sailed from England on 16 November 1797. Belissarius was reported to have been "all well" at Walwich (Walvis) Bay on 6 August 1798. She returned to England on 8 February 1799 with 75 CWT of whale bone, and 3,700 seal skins.

Year	Master	Owner	Trade	Source & notes
1799	G.Tayler	Mathers	London–Southern fishery London–Dantzig	LR; lengthened 1777, good repair 1788, & new deck 1791
1800	G.Taylor	Morley	London–Baltic	Register of Shipping; repairs 1799
1801	Chapman	Morley	London–Dantzig	Register of Shipping; repairs 1799 & good repair 1800
1802	W.Scott	Morley	London–Oporto	Register of Shipping; repairs 1799 & good repair 1800
1805	W.Scott	Morley	Belfast	LR; repairs 1799 & good repairs 1800 & 1801
1806	D.Moore	G.Taylor	Shields–Copenhagen	Register of Shipping; good repairs 1800 & small repairs 1803 & 1804
1807	W.Scott; J.King	G.Taylor	Be; Liverpool–Baltic	LR; repairs 1799 & good repairs 1800 & 1801
1809	G.Taylor	G.Taylor	Liverpool–St Johns	Register of Shipping; small repairs 1803, 1804, & 1807

== Fate ==
Bellisarius was last listed in Lloyd's Register and the Register of Shipping in 1809.
