= Little Tobago, British Virgin Islands =

Island in the British Virgin Islands

Little Tobago
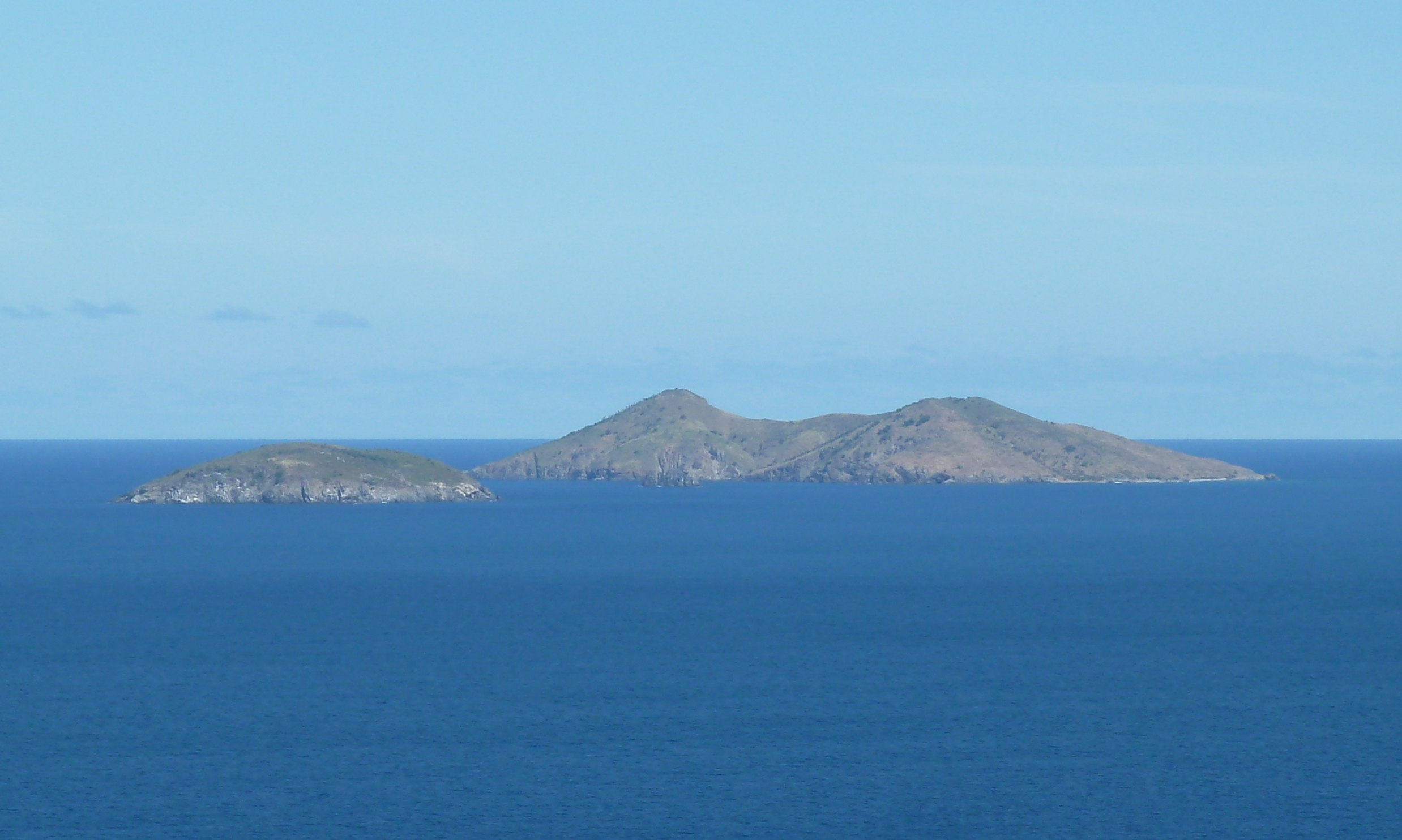
- Little Tobago (left) and Great Tobago (right), as seen from St. Thomas

- The location of Little Tobago within the British Virgin Islands

- Location within British Virgin Islands Location within the Caribbean

Geography
- Location: Caribbean Sea
- Coordinates: 18°25′39.29″N 64°50′51.03″W
- Archipelago: Virgin Islands

Administration
- United Kingdom
- British Overseas Territory: British Virgin Islands

Additional information
- Time zone: AST (UTC-4)
- ISO code: VG

Little Tobago is an uninhabited island of the British Virgin Islands in the Caribbean, located, along with sister island Great Tobago, approximately 3.6 nautical miles west of Jost Van Dyke. The Tobagos are the westernmost of the British Virgin Islands.

At 55 acres (22 ha) in size, it is surrounded by steep cliffs that also extend below the water. Since the 1990s, Great Tobago, Little Tobago islands, and nearby Mercurious and Watson Rocks are protected as part of the National Parks Trust.

There are over fifteen scuba diving sites. Though it's legal to snorkel and dive around the island, it is illegal to anchor because all potential anchoring locations are coral reefs that would be destroyed by an anchor. Large fines can occur if you violate this no-anchor zone, which is frequently patrolled by the BVI Marine Police.
