= Velizar =

Velizar (Cyrillic script: Велизар) is a Bulgarian and a Serbian masculine given name. It may refer to:

- Velizar Dimitrov (born 1979), Bulgarian footballer
- Velizar Enchev (born 1953), Bulgarian politician and journalist
- Velizar Popov (born 1976), Bulgarian football manager
