= Britannia (1772 ship) =

South Carolinan ship

History

Great Britain
- Name: Britannia
- Owner: 1776:Graham & Co.; 1786:Simpson & Co.; 1798:Hill; 1810:Raines & Co.
- Builder: 1772, or 1773 (Note: After 1783 her build year becomes 1773.) South Carolina
- Captured: 1798, and recaptured
- Fate: Last listed in 1816

General characteristics
- Tons burthen: 320, 296, (Note: It is not clear why the transcription of the letters of marque report this tonnage as it does not show up anywhere else.) (bm)
- Propulsion: Sails
- Sail plan: Brig
- Complement: 1800:20; 1804:15
- Armament: 1778:14 × 4-pounder guns; 1783:12 × 4-pounder guns; 1795:6 × 3-pounder guns; 1798:6 × 3-pounder guns + 6 × 12-pounder guns ("of the New Construction"; NC); 1800:2 × 9-pounder + 6 × 12-pounder guns (NC); 1800:12 × 12-pounder guns + 4 swivel guns; 1804:8 × 12-pounder guns + 12 swivel guns; 1805:2 × 9-pounder guns + 8 × 9-pounder carronades; 1815:8 × 18-pounder carronades
- Notes: Built of live oak. Later described as having pine sides. Between the American War of Independence and the French Revolutionary Wars she was unarmed.

Britannia was built in South Carolina (probably Charleston) in 1772. Prior to 1798, Britannia sailed between London and South Carolina, or simply served as a transport. In 1798 she changed ownership and began a sequence of whaling voyages. Between 1798 and 1807 she made a number of whaling voyages to the South Seas whale fishery, and the coast of South Africa. On one of those voyages a French privateer captured her, but Britannia was recaptured almost immediately. Between 1808 and 1816, the last year in which she is listed, she returned to operating as a London-based transport.

== Origins ==
Although Britannia was built in South Carolina, she does not appear in a list of ships registered in the colony between 1734 and 1780, suggesting that she may have been built for the British market. At the time, building ships in America was frequently cheaper than building them in Britain. She first appeared in Lloyd's Register for 1776 as a London-based transport.

== Career ==
=== Merchantman and transport ===
Year	Master	Owner	Trade
1776	S. Ball, jnr.	Graham & Co.	London Transport
1778	Sam Ball	Graham & Co.	London-New York
1779	S. Ball; Jn.Cole	Graham & Co.	Cork transport
1780	S. Ball	Graham & Co.	London-St Augustine
1781	S. Ball; J. Cole	Graham & Co.	London-St Augustine
1782	J.Cole	Graham & Co.	London-Carolina
1783	S. Ball	Graham & Co.	Carolina-London
1784	S. Ball	Graham & Co.	London-Carolina
1786	S.Ball	Graham & Co. Simpson & Co.	London-Carolina
1787	S.Ball	Simpson & Co.	London-Carolina
1789	G.Kerr	Simpson & Co.	London-Carolina
1790	G.Kerr	Simpson & Co.	London-Carolina
1791	G.Kerr	Simpson & Co.	London-Carolina
1792	G.Kerr	Simpson & Co.	London-Carolina
1793		Simpson & Co.	London-Carolina
1794		Simpson & Co.	London-Carolina
1795	Rismond; E. Redman	Simpson & Co.	London transport
1796	E. Redman	Simpson & Co.	London transport
1797	E. Redman	Simpson & Co.	London transport
1798	E. Clark	J.Hill	London-South Seas Fishery

=== Whaler ===
In 1798 Britannia changed ownership, underwent repairs, and began what would become a number of voyages to the Southern Fishery. On 16 January 1798 Captain E. Clark sailed her for New Holland. On 27 June 1798 she was reported "all well" at 27°53′N 35°10′W. On 7 August 1799 Britannia was "all well" at Smoaky Coast, near the Cape of Good Hope. She put into Cape Town for supplies on 29 August. Then on 10 October she was at St Helena. She returned to Britain on 13 January 1800.

In 1800 J. Mills (or Miles) replaced Clark. James Miles received a letter of marque on 14 March 1800. Britannia was reported "well" off the coast of Chile 23 April 1801. She was with other whalers, including Charming Kitty and DuBuc, at Delagoa Bay on 8 August 1802.

Britannia left again on 11 January 1803 with J. Miles, master. She was reported 4 November to have been at St Helena. In December she was off Ireland, in distress. As she was returning to Britain and in the Channel, the French privateer Bellona captured her. However, the frigate HMS Imperieuse recaptured Britannia on 1 December, and sent her into Plymouth, where she arrived on 12 December. She finally completed her voyage on 27 April 1804.

In 1804 Hussey replaced Miles as master of Britannia. Ammiell (or Ariel) Hussey received a letter of marque on 31 August 1804. Britannia also underwent repair for damages. Lloyd's Register shows Britannia as being engaged in the South Seas fishery in 1805. The only report of the voyage was that on 22 May 1805 Britannia, "Hussy", master, was well around Cape Horn at latitude 6°S. The report goes on to say that she had been informed of the war, and that four British vessels had been detained in port. (Note: The war was probably the resumption in 1804 of the Anglo-Spanish War, and given the latitude, the port was presumably Guayaquil.)

Captain Hussey sailed from Britain on 4 March 1806, bound for California. In August Britannia was reported off the coast of California with 30 tons of sperm oil and 150 tons of elephant seal oil. She intended to return home via Cape Horn. She arrived back in Britain on 16 April 1807.

=== Transport ===
In 1808 Captain Weatherhead replaced Hussey as captain of Britannia. The next year ownership changed to Raines & Co., and Britannia's trade returned to London transport. This entry continues almost unchanged until 1816, which is the last year in which she is listed. It's unknown if the vessel sank, was sold, or scrapped, so her fate remains unknown.
