= DuBuc (1797 ship) =

Whaling ship

History

Great Britain
- Name: DuBuc
- Owner: 1797:Tench & Co.; 1800:Mather & Co.
- Acquired: 1797 by purchase of a prize (Note: DuBuc may have been the Spanish Aimable Sophie.)
- Fate: Condemned 1808

General characteristics
- Tons burthen: 267, or 305 (Note: The length and breadth measurements would together imply a burthen of 321 tons.) (bm)
- Length: 98 ft 6 in (30.0 m)
- Beam: 27 ft 1 in (8.3 m)
- Propulsion: Sails
- Complement: 30
- Armament: 1797: 2 × 6-pounder guns; 1807:6 × 12-pounder guns + 6 swivel guns

DuBuc was a vessel captured in 1797 and sold that year for mercantile use. She initially became a West Indiaman, but then the whaling company Mather & Co. purchased her. She made four voyages for them, being condemned at Hobart in October 1808.

== Career ==
DuBuc first appears in Lloyd's Register in 1797, having undergone a "good repair" that year, with F. Muller, master, and trade London-Martinique. In 1799 Mather & Co. became her owners. Her master became William Dagg, and her trade London-Botany Bay.

1st whaling voyage: DuBuc, William Dagg, master, sailed in 1800. She was reported to have returned to the Cape of Good Hope from the South Seas in 1801, with Page, master. She returned to Britain on 6 December 1801.

2nd whaling voyage: Captain William Davey (or Davie), sailed DuBuc for Delagoa Bay on 9 March 1802. She was with other whalers, including Britannia and Charming Kitty, at Delagoa Bay on 8 August. She returned to Britain via St Helena, arriving on 23 November 1803.

3rd whaling voyage: DuBuc, Jonathan Taylor, master, sailed on 10 April 1804. She was at St Helena on 26 March 1806, having come from New Holland with 250 barrels of sperm oil and 900 barrels whale oil. Also at St Helena, DuBuc took on board the oil of Commerce, of Liverpool, Eckstein, master, which had been condemned at St Helena as Commerce was returning from the South Seas. However, a report a week later revealed that Commerce simply intended to proceed on another voyage. She therefore had transferred her cargo of oil, about 150 tons, to DuBuc and Aurora. DuBuc returned to Britain on 19 June.

4th whaling voyage: For this voyage DuBuc had new owners: T. Blyth, Samuel Chace, William Dagg, and Thomas Anderson. Captain Samuel Chase (or Chace) sailed from Britain on 10 April 1807, bound for the New South Wales fishery. He was issued a letter of marque on 2 October 1807, though by that time he had already sailed. She gathered 180 tons of oil, all in the River Derwent (Tasmania).

== Fate ==
In October, Du Buc sailed from Hobart, Van Diemen's Land. However she sprang a leak at sea and put back into the Derwent. There she was condemned. Æolus transhipped her cargo. Æolus left Port Jackson on 1 April bound for England. After Du Buc was condemned she was towed to Kangaroo Bay (or Kangaroo Bluff, Bellrieve) in November and scuttled there. Her timbers lay there for many years.

Her surgeon, Dr Thomas Birch, settled in Hobart where he became a local surgeon, merchant, shipowner and whaler.

Captain Chase became master of Pegasus, which left Sydney in April 1809 and arrived back in England in 1810.
