= Cyrus (1800 whaler) =

Ship launched in Salem, Massachusetts

History

United States
- Name: Cyrus
- Builder: Salem, Massachusetts
- Launched: 1792 or 1800
- Fate: Sold or transferred to France in 1802

France
- Name: Cyrus
- Owner: Louis De Baecque
- Commissioned: July 1803
- Home port: Dunkirk
- Captured: 23 September 1803

United Kingdom
- Name: Cyrus
- Owner: Various
- Acquired: 1804; purchase of a prize
- Fate: No longer trading after 1854 and no longer listed after 1856

General characteristics
- Tonnage: 324 (French tons; "of load")
- Tons burthen: 281, or 288 (bm)
- Propulsion: Sail
- Armament: 8 × 6-pounder guns

Cyrus was a whaler launched at Salem in 1800 (or possibly early in 1792). She performed one whaling voyage for French owners before a British letter of marque captured her in 1803. From 1804 on, she performed 17 whaling voyages for British owners in the almost half a century between 1804 and 1853. The first five were for Samuel Enderby & Sons. Between 1 August 1834 and 2 June 1848 her captain was Richard Spratly, namesake of Spratly Island and the group of islands and reefs known as the Spratly Islands. She apparently made one last voyage in 1854, but then no longer traded. She was last listed in Lloyd's Register in 1856.

== 1800–1804 ==
Cyrus first entered Lloyd's Register in the Supplement to the 1802 edition. Her master was Hamond, and her trade was London–Dunkirk. However, despite the outbreak of the Napoleonic Wars and the end of the Peace of Amiens she went whaling in South African waters. She left Dunkirk on 3 August under the command of Captain Archelaus Hammond.

By 25 September 1803, the letter of marque Scorpion was at Delagoa Bay on the east coast of Africa. There she captured two French whalers: Cyrus, and Ganges. (Note: Some reports of the capture refer to Scorpion as a British Royal Navy frigate. She was not. She had been a Navy 22-gun sloop until the Admiralty had sold her in 1802 and her new owners fitted her out as an armed whaler sailing under a letter of marque.) At the time of her capture Cyrus was under the command of Archelaus Hammond. Scorpion then escorted both into St Helena. From there they sailed to Britain where they were sold, with their new owners fitting them out for whaling and arming them.

When Cyrus was sold in 1804, Lloyd's Register gave the name of the buyer as Mather & Co., a noted owner of whaling vessels. Her new captain was her former mate, Paul West.

== Whaler ==
Cyrus's first whaling voyage began on 12 July 1804 with Paul West, master. Cyrus reported that the whaler Alexander arrived at St Helena on 26 March 1806 from New Holland with 1200 barrels sperm oil. She also reported that Kingston had arrived from the Isle of Desolation with 1600 barrels of "black oil". On 12 April 1806 Cyrus was still at St Helena, and she returned to Britain on 17 June.

On her second whaling voyage, Cyrus's master was Andrew Pinkham. She left on 19 August 1806 for the Pacific Ocean. On 14 December she was at Cape Horn. In March 1807 she was around Cape Horn and "all well". By July she was back in the South Atlantic, being "all well" on the coast of Brazil. She returned to Britain on 22 July 1808.

Cyrus left on 1 September 1808 on her third whaling voyage, this time under the command first of "Walls", and then Paul West. She returned to Britain on 6 July 1810.

Paul West was again Cyrus's master on 29 September 1810 when she left on her fourth whaling voyage. She was at St Helena on 17 May 1812, and back in Britain on 20 July.

On her fifth whaling voyage Cyrus left Britain in 1812 and returned on 4 May 1814. Her master was W. Davey.

Enderbys sold Cyrus to "Thompson", who thus became her owner for her sixth and seventh whaling voyages. (Note: This was Ebenezer and William Thompson.)

In 1813 the British East India Company (EIC) had lost its monopoly on the trade between India and Britain. British ships were then free to sail to India or the Indian Ocean under a licence from the EIC. Cyrus's owners applied for a licence to sail to certain ports in the East Indies under the provisions for whalers. They applied on 5 August and received the licence on 8 August.

Cyrus left on her sixth whaling voyage on 30 August 1814, with W. Davey (or Davies), as master, and with Peru as her destination. She left in a convoy and by 12 December 1815 was reported off the coast of Peru. She returned to Britain on 15 March 1816 with 550 casks of oil.

W. Davey (or Davy) was again Cyrus's master in 1816 when she left on her seventh whaling voyage. She returned to Britain on 9 June 1818 with 410 casks.

Thompson sold Cyrus to Jarvis & Co., who would be her owners for her next four and possibly five whaling voyages.

Cyrus's eighth voyage began on 26 August 1818 when Captain Hale (or Hall), sailed her for Peru. She returned to Britain on 19 March 1821 with 350 casks. On 21 February 1821 she spoke Robert Quayle, Leslie, master. Robert Quayle was 104 days out of Van Diemen's Land. (Note: The coordinates in the report, 20°31′S 42°45′W, would put the encounter within Brazil. Reversing longitude and latitude to 42°45′S 20°31′W would put the location of the encounter within the South Atlantic.)

On 15 July 1821 Cyrus left again, on her ninth whaling voyage, still under the command of Captain Hall. She was at Honolulu on 1 October 1823, full but for 90 barrels. She next stopped at Pitcairn Island 10 December. She returned to Britain on 6 April 1824 with 520 casks.

Cyrus, Hall, master, sailed on 28 September 1824 on her tenth whaling voyage. She was reported at Tahiti on 24 December 1826. She returned to Britain on 25 May 1827 with 400 casks of oil.

Cyrus's 11th voyage began on 14 September 1827. Her master's name is given variously as Kingston, Rennolds, or Hunkman. Lloyds Register (1827) gives her master's name as Davy, changing to Hingstone. Cyrus was near Bouka in early February 1829. On 2 February she spoke Lusitania, which also was whaling in the area. Then Cyrus was reported to have 150 barrels on 9 March 1830. She returned to Britain on 10 May 1830 with 450 casks of oil.

It is not clear when Cyrus began her 12th whaling voyage. It is also not entirely clear who her owners were. Her master was Inkstone or John William Hingston. The Register of Shipping gives her master as Hingston and her owner as Jarvis & Co. In September 1831 she was at the Moluccas with 900 barrels. On 12 August 1833 she was at St Helena, having come from Timor. She returned to Britain on 18 October 1833.

Cyrus's 13th whaling voyage began on 1 August 1834. This was the first of four under the command of Richard Spratly (or Spratley), and the first with W. Ive as owner. She was reported on 15 May 1835 with 150 barrels, and on 30 October 1835 with 500 barrels. She was at St Helena on 28 August 1836. However she did not return to Britain until 7 November 1837, when she arrived with 500 casks of oil.

For her 14th whaling voyage, Spratly sailed from Britain on 28 May 1838, bound for Timor. She was at Timor on 6 October 1838 and in the Straits of Macassar on 20 June 1839 with 600 barrels and seven fish. There she came alongside Medea for supplies. Scorpion was at Kema on 6 October 1839 and at Celebes from 22 June to July 1840. A report dated 1 December 1840 stated that after 25 months (i.e., in June 1840), she had gathered 1550 barrels. She was at Cape Town on 14 April 1841 and returned to Britain on 3 July 1841.

On 25 September 1841, Cyrus, Richard Spratly, master, and J. Staynes & W. Ive, owners, sailed on her 15th whaling voyage, again to Timor. She was at Samboanya 14 June 1842 (Zamboanga?) and at Kema 4 March 1843. She was again at Samboanya on 10 March 1843. On 29 March Spratly sighted what is now known as Spratly Island and Ladd Reef (see Spratly's contributions to navigational knowledge). Between 24 February and 3 March 1844, Cyrus was again at Kema. This gave rise to the Kema incident when several crew members deserted and Cyruseventually sailed, leaving them behind. She was at St Helena on 15 June 1844 and at Brava, Cape Verde, on 14 July. She returned to Britain on 16 August with 470 casks.

Spratly sailed Cyrus on his fourth as her master and her 16th whaling voyage, leaving Britain on 16 May 1845. She was reported to have been at North Island on 15 April 1845. (Note: North Island – the northmost of three islands in the bay that formed the principle anchorage of Enggano Island.) She was then at Batavia, Dutch East Indies, on 18 September, preparing to sail for the south seas. She returned to Britain on 2 June 1848.

For Cyrus's last whaling voyage she left Britain on 9 November 1849. Her master was Martinson, and later G. Webster, and her owner W. Ive. She returned to Britain on 27 June 1853 with 10 tuns of sperm oil.

== Fate ==
Lloyd's Register (1854) had an entry for Cyrus, giving her master as "Hensbrgh", her owner as W. Ives, and her trade as London-"M'lm'm". Lloyd's Registers for 1855 and 1856 still listed Cyrus, but they no longer listed a homeport or trade. Lloyd's Register for 1857 no longer listed Cyrus at all.
