= Richard Spratly =

British Sea Captain (1802–1870)

Captain Richard Spratly (1802–1870) was a British sea captain and contributor to navigational records, after whom the Spratly Islands in the South China Sea are named.

== Early life ==
Richard Spratly was born on 22 January 1802 in the parish of All Saints, Poplar, East London. His father, Thomas, is described on his birth certificate as a boatbuilder. His mother was Ann née Myers. He was the second of four children (Mary Ann born 25 December 1799), Jane (born 15 December 1812) and William (born 18 March 1815).

== Early voyages ==
1818, 6 June – Spratly first sails as an apprentice on Earl of Marley (possibly Earl Morley, a whaler)
1824, June – Spratly sails as 2nd officer on Marquis of Huntley, a convict ship
1832, 1 September – Convict ship York, with Richard Spratly as captain, sails from Plymouth with 200 convicts on board.
1832, 29 December – Convict ship York, with Richard Spratly as captain, arrives Van Diemen's Land (Tasmania)
1833, 20 October – Cyrus, under Captain Hingston, arrives Gravesend from the Southern Ocean. Owners were Jarvis and Co.
1834, 5 July – Richard Spratly replaces Hingston as master of Cyrus
1837, 25 October – Cyrus arrives at Portsmouth from South Seas
1838, (unknown) – Cyrus surveyed by Lloyds
1838, June – Cyrus departs on a whaling voyage

In 1844, Richard Spratly was sailing past Manado, on Sulawesi. He became the witness to an attack by a local sultan on Erskine Murray's yacht Young Queen, captained by Captain Hait, and the brig Anne, captained by Captain Lewis. The account was documented in a letter titled 'Honorable E. Murray' and published in the Sydney Shipping Gazette.

== Kema incident ==
According to accounts by the crew, on 24 February 1844, Cyrus anchored at Kema Roads, Celebes, with a valuable cargo of whale oil. The next day the crew went ashore, but returned a few men short. Two men, Heron and Robson, were spotted and told to return but fled after they were confronted, only to return later on the 28th. Crew members Howland and Heron went missing on 2 March. Finally on 3 March, after much searching and drunken antics by her crew on the Dutch-occupied island, Cyrus sailed away to return to England, but without the missing crew members.

Upon returning to Great Britain in August 1844, the crew was summoned to a hearing by William Heron's mother. The incident had not been well documented, and there was not enough evidence to suggest one way or the other if Captain Spratly was guilty of abandoning them without a thorough search, therefore no jury trial followed. The account given by the newspapers was starkly different from the crew's accounts recorded by the courts, and gave more details of the course of events.

=== Crew ===
Circa. 1838–1844

- Captain Richard Spratly, Master
- Chief Officer George Cotton
- Second Officer William Spratly
- Francis Rankin, Surgeon
- William Heron, Cooper's Mate (abandoned in Keimes, Celebes 1841)
- Mr Howland (abandoned in Keimes, Celebes 1841)
- Mr Robson
- Mr Brown
- George Lansdell

== Contributions to navigational knowledge ==
Captain Spratly occasionally submitted navigational routes and survey information to The Nautical Magazine and the Naval Chronicles.

On 29 March 1843, Spratly sighted what is now known in English as Spratly Island and Ladd Reef. Richard Spratly was the name reported by Captain Doyle of Australia and Captain Campbell of the Hydrographic Office His sighting was reported in The Nautical Magazine in the year 1843:

... at 9 h. A.M. a low sandy island was discovered from the masthead, bearing S.E.bE. four leagues. On nearing the beach was visible to the water's edge, the top appearing to be covered with small bushes, and about the height of a Ship's hull, with a black patch dividing the sandy beach in nearly two equal parts to the water's edge... One [of these two dangers] I call Ladd Reef, after Captain Ladd of the Ship Austen, who appears first to have seen it; the other Spratly's Sandy Island.

The publication of his voyage in the Nautical Magazine popularized his naming of the island, even though the island had previously been named "Horsburgh's Storm Island" by Captain James Horsburgh. The British Admiralty finally agreed that the scattered islands in the area be named the Spratly Islands.

== Later voyages ==
1845, 22 May – Cyrus departs from The Downs [off Dover]
1845, 18 Sept – Cyrus under Spratly in Batavia, from London, for South Seas
1848, 1 June – Cyrus, under Spratly, returns to England from the South Seas
1848, 8 June – Spratly stops being Master of Cyrus
1849, March – Spratly becomes Master of Margaret
1849, 1 April – Margaret, under Spratley, departs bound for the South Seas
1851, 11 April – Spratly letter in The Nautical Magazine (p. 490: "Eastern Navigation from the Margaret")
1852, unknown – Margaret, Spratly, master, bound for the South Sea (Lloyds Register)
1852, 6 March – Spratly stops being master of Margaret
1853, 29 June – Richard Spratly makes claim for Master's certificate of service
1853, July – Richard Spratly granted Master's certificate in London
1858, 24 March – Atalanta, Capt. Spratly, belonging to Messrs. Wilson and Cooke, London, was despatched by Mr. J.B. Wilcocks, from Plymouth, on Wednesday, 24 March, with 396 Government emigrants for Melbourne, comprising 26 married couples, 98 single men, 163 single women, and 83 children, of whom 147 were English and 249 Irish; under the medical care of Mr. J.S. Ireland.
1858 7 June Atalanta arrives at Melbourne, Victoria and Sydney in 1859.
1860 5 March Atalanta (960 tons) departs England(?) carrying 345 emigrants (28 men, 297 women, 20 children)
1860 30 May Atalanta arrives Victoria, Australia after voyage of 86 days
1861 Richd Spratly noted in Census. Married, age 59. Master, not living on board. Vessel Atalanta. Number 5 Jetty North Side East India Docks

There is an entry for a Captain Richard Spratly as master of Redrose in 1864. It's not clear if this is the same Richard Spratly.

== Final days ==
Richard Spratly died, "at the residence of his nephew, Ealing, Middlesex, aged 69.". The address on death certificate is Oxton Villa, Ealing. The cause of death was pleuropneumonia. The informant was Richard's youngest child, Matilda M. Spratly, resident of Rock Ferry, Birkenhead.

== Family life ==
He married Jane Miller at St George in the East, Cannon Street Road, London in 1828. He had four children: Jane Miller Spratly, born in Stepney, 24 February 1839; Richard Jolly Spratly, born in Stepney 21 June 1842; Thomas Miller Spratly, baptised in Whitechapel St Mary, 26 November 1845 and Matilda, born in Ramsgate 9 July 1849. In the 1861 UK National Census Rich Spratly is recorded as Master of the vessel Atalanta. Number 5 Jetty North Side East India Docks but not living on board. The family are recorded as: Richard (Master Mariner, 59) & Jane (born Whitechapel, 52) Spratly living together 22 Robinsons Road, Hackney (district 6) with Richard (son, 18 born Stepney), Thomas (son, 15 born Ramsgate) and Jane (daughter, 22 born Stepney). Matilda Spratly (daughter, 11, born Ramsgate, staying with friends)
