= Charming Kitty (1799 ship) =

British whaler 1799–1813

History

Great Britain
- Name: Charming Kitty
- Owner: Robert Wigram (1799-1801); John Shuttleworth (1802-1813)
- Acquired: c.1799 as prize
- Fate: Wrecked 1813

General characteristics
- Tons burthen: 303 (bm)
- Propulsion: Sail

Charming Kitty was a ship captured from the Spanish. She first appeared in Great Britain's Protection Lists for whalers in 1799. She conducted four whaling voyages between 1799 and 1808, before becoming a West Indiaman, trading with the Caribbean. She was wrecked in October 1813.

== Whaling voyages ==
Charming Kitty left Britain on her first whaling voyage 21 March 1799, under the command of John Mather, master, with destination Walvis Bay. Charming Kitty was reported at Walvis Bay in August 1801, with Burn, master. By 19 September 1801, she was at St Helena, and she arrived back at Britain on 6 December.

Captain Thaddeus Luce (or Lewis) sailed Charming Kitty on 16 March 1802, from Britain and bound for Delagoa Bay. She was reported there with other whalers, including Britannia, DuBuc and Resolution, on 8 August. (Note: Between 1795 and 1797 Luce had sailed another whaler, Robust, on two whaling voyages.)

She left Cape of Good Hope on 12 February 1804, for Britain, and arrived there on 3 April 1804.

In August 1802, the Honourable the Court of Directors of the East India Company announced that they had licensed 19 vessels, Albion, Charming Kitty, and Flirt among them, to sail east of the Cape of Good Hope to engage in whaling in the "Southern Whale Fishery". At the time Charming Kitty was valued at £9,000.

Charming Kitty's third whaling voyage began on 1 July 1804, when she left Britain under the command of George Hedge (or Hodges), master. She was reported to have called at Rio de Janeiro in January 1805, with 40 tons of oil, but with her master and seven crew members dead. Her new master appears to have been "Mitchell". She returned to Rio in December, to refill her water casks. She left St Helena on 7 September, in a convoy under the escort of the 50-gun HMS Antelope, (Note: The whalers and other vessels had been waiting at St Helena for about a month for the arrival of the East Indiaman Warren Hastings when news arrived that the French had captured her,) and returned to Britain on 29 October 1806.

Captain Henry King sailed Charming Kitty on her fourth and last whaling voyage. She left Britain on 9 February 1807, bound for Delagoa Bay. She was reported to have been at Delagoa Bay on 1 August, and on 1 September 1807. She sailed out of the Cape of Good Hope on 19 January 1808. She was then reported "feared lost". She arrived in Britain on 12 December 1808, but put into Ramsgate on 15 December 1808, having lost her anchor, cables, and bowsprit.

== Subsequent career ==
Charming Kitty's entry in Lloyd's Register for 1809 showed an amendment, changing master from H. King to Manning, and her trade from South Seas to Yucatán.

Lloyd's Register for 1810, gave her trade as London-Antigua, her master as Manning, and her owner as Shuttleworth.

Charming Kitty was reported to have been at Havana on 11 June 1812, loading for London.

== Fate ==
Charming Kitty, Nevin, master, was lost near Bermuda on 20 October 1813. Her crew and part of the cargo were saved. She had been sailing from British Honduras to London.
