= List of ship launches in 1792 =

The list of ship launches in 1792 includes a chronological list of some ships launched in 1792.

Date	Ship	Class	Builder	Location	Country	Notes
10 January	Nancy	Merchantman	Barnard	Deptford	Great Britain	For Phynn & Co.
24 January	Trajan	Téméraire-class ship of the line		Lorient	France	For French Navy.
23 February	Adventure	Sloop		Meares Island	New Spain	For Robert Gray.
8 March	Sutil	Goleta	Manuel Bastarrachea	San Blas	New Spain	For Spanish Navy.
10 March	Diana	Fifth rate	Honorato Bouyon	Barcelona	Spain	For Spanish Navy.
15 June	Camilla	Merchantman	John Barry	Whitby	Great Britain	For private owner.
21 July	Carron	Full-rigged ship		Bombay Dockyard	India	For Bruce, Fawcett & Co.
August	Nourrice	Flûte	Raymond-Antoine Haran	Bayonne	France	For private owner.
18 September	Brunswick	East Indiaman	Perry	Blackwall	Great Britain	For British East India Company.
1 October	Bombay Castle	East Indiaman	Randall	Rotherhithe	Great Britain	For British East India Company.
10 October	Sviatoi Aleksandr	Aleksandr-class rowing frigate	D. Masalsky	Saint Petersburg	Russia	For Imperial Russian Navy.
17 October	Sviataia Ekaterina	Alekasandr-class rowing frigate	D. Masalsky	Saint Petersburg	Russia	For Imperial Russian Navy.
31 October	Exeter	East Indiaman	Perry	Blackwall, London	Great Britain	For British East India Company.
29 November	Glatton	East Indiaman	John Wells	Blackwall	Great Britain	For British East India Company.
30 November	Prompte	Prompte-class corvette		Havre de Grâce	France	For French Navy.
1 December	Nidelven	Lougen-class brig	Ernst Wilhelm Stibolt	Copenhagen	Denmark-Norway	For Dano-Norwegian Navy.
7 December	Skjold	Prindsesse Sophia Frederica-class ship of the line	Henrik Gerner	Copenhagen	Denmark-Norway	For Dano-Norwegian Navy.
15 December	Sem None	Sixth rate		Lisbon	Portugal	For Portuguese Navy.
15 December	Vasco de Gama	Third rate	Torcato José Clavina	Lisbon	Portugal	For Portuguese Navy.
Unknown date	Albion	East Indiaman	F. W. Hurry	Newcastle upon Tyne	Great Britain	For F. W. Hurry.
Unknown date	Bangalore	Merchantman	G. Gillett	Calcutta	India	For private owner.
Unknown date	Bolton	Slave ship		Liverpool	Great Britain	For Bolton & Co.
Unknown date	Born	Full-rigged ship		Bombay	India	For private owner.
Unknown date	British Tar	Whaler	Temple	South Shields	Great Britain	For Mr. Mangles.
Unknown date	Charles Jackson	Merchantman	Edward Mosley	Howdon	Great Britain	For Mr. Jackson.
Unknown date	Clarendon	West Indiaman		Lancaster	Great Britain	For Peatt & Co.
Unknown date	Diable à Quatre	Privateer		Bordeaux	France	For private owner.
Unknown date	Diligence	Schooner		Washington, North Carolina	United States	For Revenue Cutter Service.
Unknown date	Duckenfield	West Indiaman		River Thames	Great Britain	For Mr. Nesbit.
Unknown date	Echo	Merchantman		Hull	Great Britain	For Mr. Staniforth.
Unknown date	Eliza	Brig		Philadelphia, Pennsylvania	United States	For private owner.
Unknown date	Experiment	Merchantman		Leith	Great Britain	For J. Scoughal.
Unknown date	Ferahnüma	Corvette	Hammâmîzâde Ahmed Pasha	Silistra	Ottoman Empire	For Ottoman Navy.
Unknown date	Ganges	Merchantman			India	For Thomas Patrickson.
Unknown date	Hawk	Merchantman	Messrs. Ritchie	Belfast	Ireland	For private owner.
Unknown date	Hercules	East Indiaman		New England	United States	For private owner.
Unknown date	John and James	Merchantman		Philadelphia, Pennsylvania	United States	For George Morrison.
Unknown date	Lord Rodney	Privateer			Great Britain	For private owner.
Unknown date	Rambler	West Indiaman	Ing. Eskdale	Whitby	Great Britain	For James Atty.
Unknown date	Sarah	Full-rigged ship		Bombay	India	For private owner.
Unknown date	Union	Sloop		Somerset, Massachusetts	United States	For William Burroughs, John Finch, Benjamin Hicks and John Nicolas.
Unknown date	Name unknown	Merchantman			South America	For private owner.
Unknown date	Name unknown	Brig		Batavia	Dutch East Indies	For Dutch East India Company.
Unknown date	Name unknown	Merchantman			France	For private owner.
Unknown date	Name unknown	Merchantman			France	For private owner.
Unknown date	Name unknown	Brig or snow		Ostend	Dutch Republic	For private owner.
Unknown date	Name unknown	Merchantman			Spain	For private owner.
Unknown date	Name unknown	Merchantman			(Kingdom of Great Britain) Bermuda	For private owner.
Unknown date	Name unknown	Merchantman			France	For private owner.
Unknown date	Name unknown	Merchantman			United States	For private owner.
