= List of ships named Rambler =

Several ships have borne the name Rambler:

- Rambler (1792 ship) was launched at Whitby. She was a transport and West Indiaman, though she made a voyage to Smyrna before returning to the West Indies trade. She was condemned at Antigua in early 1808, having been damaged while sailing from Jamaica to London.
- Rambler (1803 ship) was built in France and taken in prize in 1797. In 1803 she became a whaler until a French privateer captured her in November 1807.
- Rambler (1812 ship) was launched in America. The British captured her in 1813 as she was returning to America from Manila. She then briefly became a West Indiaman. In 1815 she became a whaler in the Southern Fishery. She made four complete whaling voyages and was wrecked on her fifth.
- Rambler (1813 ship) was launched at Medford, Massachusetts. She may have engaged in one voyage as a privateer, but then made a voyage to China as a letter of marque. On that voyage she captured several British merchant vessels, at least two of which she released. She captured one that gave rise to an incident between the British East India Company (EIC), Royal Navy, and the Chinese government. Rambler returned to the United States in 1815 and her subsequent history is currently obscure.
- USS Rattlesnake was the brig Rambler built in Medford, Massachusetts, in 1812 that the United States Navy purchased in July 1813. Rattlesnake captured numerous British merchant vessels before HMS Leander captured her in mid-1814. The Royal Navy apparently purchased her at Nova Scotia, but there is no record of her subsequent career.

== See also ==
- HMS Rambler - one of four vessels of the British Royal Navy
- USS Rambler (SP-211) - a steam yacht acquired by the United States Navy during World War I for patrol duty.
