= Bangalore (disambiguation) =

Bangalore is the former name of Bengaluru, the capital of the Indian state of Karnataka.

Bangalore or Bengaluru may also refer to:

== Ships ==
- Bangalore (1792 ship) was built at Calcutta and was wrecked in the Flores Sea in 1802
- Bangalore (1886 ship) foundered in 1908
- SS Bangalore (1867), a steamer involved in the shipwreck of the Prince Rupert; see List of shipwrecks in April 1874
- Bangalore-class destroyer or Kolkata-class destroyer, a class of stealth destroyer built for the Indian Navy

== Other uses ==
- Bengaluru Urban district, Karnataka, India
- Bengaluru North district, Karnataka, India
- Bangalore torpedo, an explosive charge placed on the end of a long, extendable tube
- Bangalore, a racehorse that finished unplaced in the 1842 Grand National
- Bangalore, one of the playable characters in Apex Legends
- Royal Challengers Bengaluru, a T20 cricket team in the Indian Premier League
- Royal Challengers Bengaluru (WPL), a T20 cricket team in the Women's Premier League

== See also ==
- Bangalore Stadium (disambiguation)
- Bangalored, a neologism related to offshoring
- Mangalore (disambiguation)
