= Roehampton (ship) =

Several ships have been named Roehampton for Roehampton:

Several ships have been named Roehampton:

- Roehampton (1785) was built on the Thames in 1785.
- Roehampton (1798 ship) was built in the United States in 1792, possibly in Baltimore, and almost certainly under another name. Between 1798 and 1803 she traded between England and North America. From 1803 she made two complete voyages as a slave ship, but disappeared on her way home on her third.
- Roehampton (1852 ship) was built in Sunderland on 5 May 1852. She sailed to India and Australia, and carried immigrants to New Zealand. She foundered on 3 March 1859 while participating in the guano trade from Peru.
