= Ice Boat No. 3 =

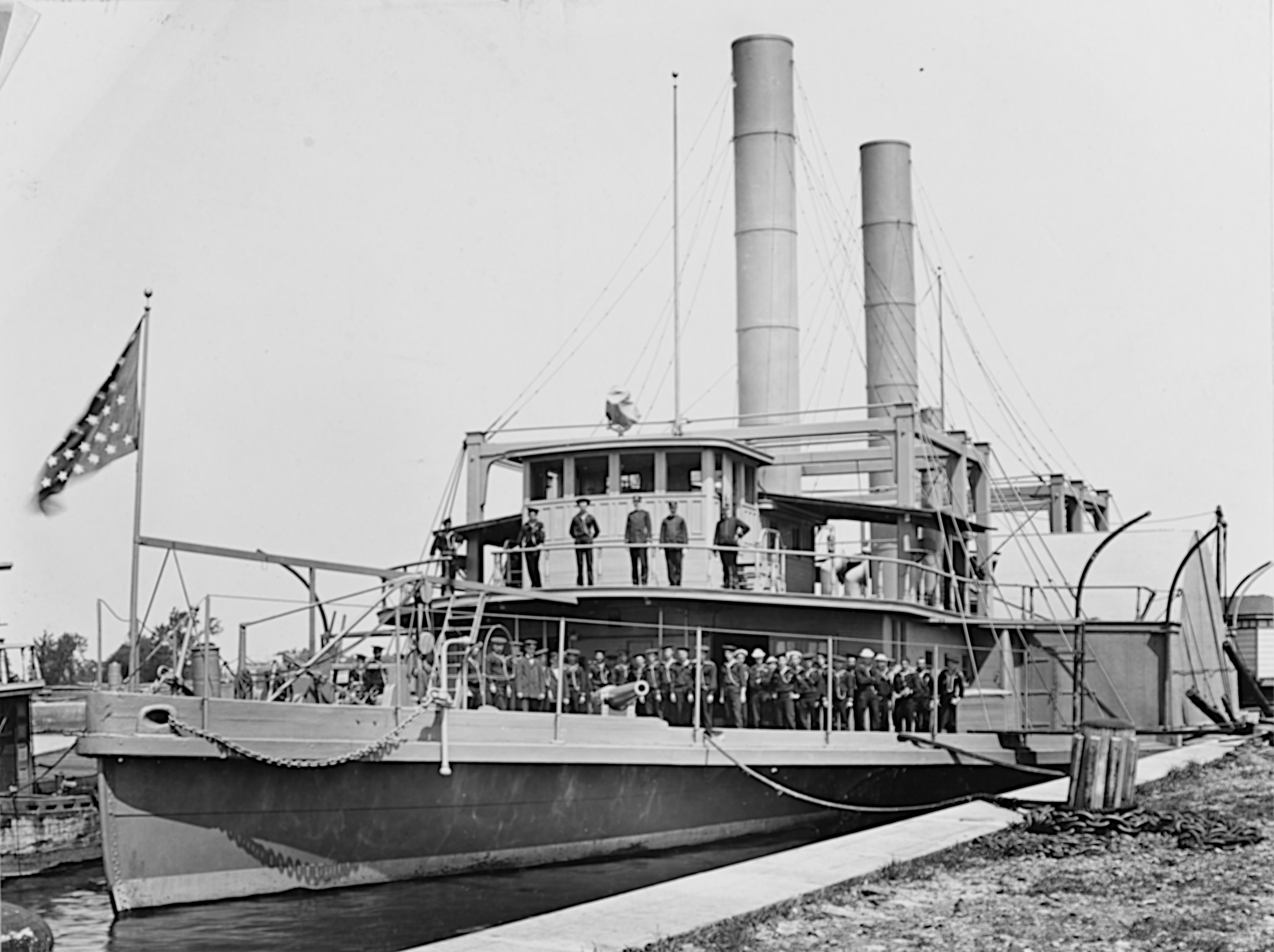
- Officers and crew posing aboard USS Arctic, ca. July–August 1898

History
- Name: City Ice Boat No. 3
- Owner: City of Philadelphia
- Builder: Wood, Dialogue & Co. (Camden, New Jersey)
- Launched: 5 November 1873
- Completed: 1873
- Acquired: (By US Navy): 5 May 1898
- Commissioned: (USN): 9 July—23 August 1898
- In service: February 1874
- Out of service: 5 February 1905
- Renamed: USS Arctic (1898); City Ice Boat No. 3 (1898)
- Fate: Sunk in collision with underwater obstruction, 5 February 1905

General characteristics
- Type: Sidewheel steamboat
- Displacement: 1,537 tons
- Length: 201 ft 6 in (61.4 m)
- Beam: 33 ft 5 in (10.2 m)
- Draft: 13 ft 6 in (4.1 m)
- Propulsion: 500 nhp horizontal direct-acting steam engine;
- Complement: City Ice Boat Dept: 31; USN: 64 (6 officers, 58 enlisted)
- Armament: (USN): 1 × 60-pdr breech-loader, converted from a Civil War-era Parrott rifle; 2 × 47 mm

City Ice Boat No. 3, commonly known as Ice Boat No. 3 or just No. 3, was a municipal sidewheel icebreaker built in 1873 to assist in keeping Philadelphia's waterways free of ice during the winter months. The vessel was also used for occasional excursions and other duties through the rest of the year.

During the Spanish–American War, Ice Boat No. 3 was briefly commissioned into the U.S. Navy as the coastal patrol vessel USS Arctic, before returning to her normal duties under her original name. Ice Boat No. 3 was sunk in a collision with an underwater obstruction in February 1905.

== Construction and design ==
In the early 1870s, the City of Philadelphia decided that its two existing icebreakers were not sufficient to keep Philadelphia's waterways free of ice, and that a third would be required. Accordingly, the council ordered a new vessel from the recently established iron shipbuilding firm of Wood, Dialogue & Co. of Camden, New Jersey. The new boat, an iron-hulled sidewheel icebreaker named City Ice Boat No. 3, cost $245,000 and was launched at Kaighn's Point, New Jersey, on 5 November 1873.

City Ice Boat No.3 had a length of 201 feet 6 inches, a beam of 33 feet 5 inches and a draft of 13 feet 6 inches. (Note: DANFS gives the following values: length 198 ft 3 in; beam 33 ft 3 in; mean draft 12 ft.) She had a gross register tonnage of 637.2 tons (326.42 tons net) and a displacement of 1,537 tons. Photos taken during the vessel's naval service indicate that she was a double-ender, with a smaller pilothouse astern. (Note: Images taken of the ship during her naval service show one pilothouse with four windows and a second pilothouse with two, indicating the vessel was a double ender with a smaller pilothouse astern. Further confirmation can be had from the fact that the first image shows davits forward of the paddle boxes while the second shows the davits aft, while the larger pilothouse can be discerned in the second image just above the paddle box.) Her powerplant—a steam engine of the horizontal direct-acting type—was rated at a nominal horsepower of 500. It is not known what icebreaking features were incorporated into her design, but she is known to have been capable of making unusually sharp turns. (Note: Icebreakers at this time had few specialized features; the usual method of breaking ice was to run the bow of the boat over the top of the ice, thus breaking it with the weight of the ship. Sometimes the bow itself was designed for this purpose.) She was the largest of the city's three icebreakers, the only one with an electric generating plant and electric lighting, and throughout her career was considered the best of the three.

== Service history ==
Apart from special occasions, the city's ice boats were usually only employed for two or three months of the year—through the winter months of December/January through February/March—being laid up for repair or refit the rest of the year. Though their primary role was to keep Philadelphia's channel to the sea free of ice, towing vessels endangered or hampered by ice was an important secondary task, which had the additional benefit of earning the city towage fees.

=== Municipal service, 1874–1898 ===
Ice Boat No. 3's trial trip was scheduled for 31 January 1874, with Philadelphia's city council members invited to attend. Almost immediately thereafter, the ice boat entered service in the vicinity of New Castle, Delaware, towing two vessels, a bark bound for Hamburg and a brig for Matanzas, on 3 February. The following winter, No. 3 was again in service off New Castle, towing a bark bound for Bremen and another for Yokohama in early March.

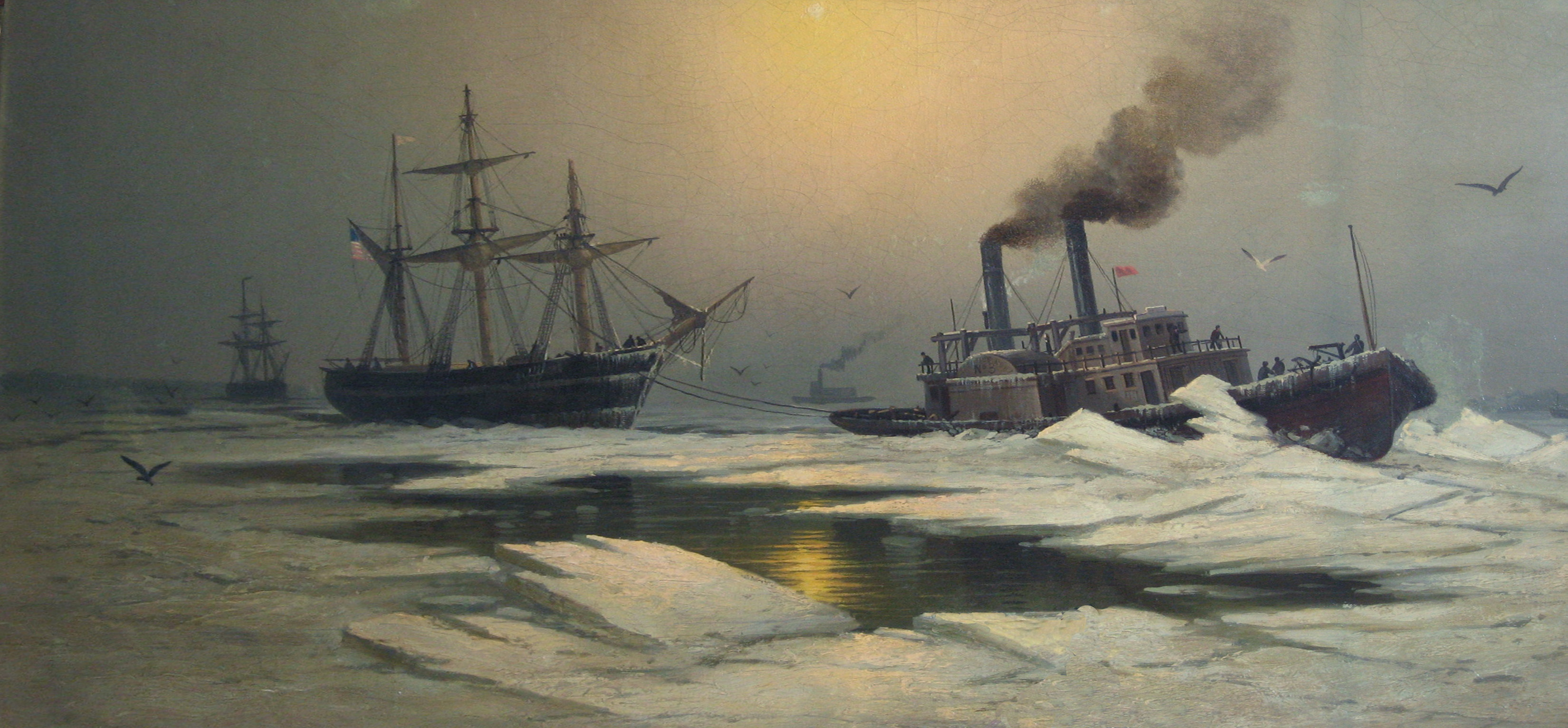
An 1877 painting depicting Ice Boat No. 3 on the Delaware, towing a sailing ship

On 4 February 1881, Ice Boat No. 3, operating under the command of Captain Henry F. Virden near the Delaware Breakwater, went to the assistance of two pilot boats, Bavard and Knight, towing them into harbor, and later aided an imperilled lightship. That same day, the ice boat conducted a search for the abandoned bark Arundel, which was eventually located five miles offshore "in a dangerous position ... fast in the ice" and "with great difficulty" towed the vessel to the Breakwater harbor, arriving 11 pm. Later, the ice boat took aboard the crew of Arundel and resumed tow of the vessel, returning it to the port of Philadelphia on 8 February. Because the Arundel had been abandoned by its crew, the crew of Ice Boat No. 3 sued for salvage, the sum of $2,500 eventually being granted to them by the U.S. District Court.

On 10 January 1891, Ice Boat No. 3 was scheduled to tow the school ship Saratoga to sea from the port of Philadelphia, when a change of personnel aboard the ship necessitated a postponement. The following year, on December 28, the tug Crawford was caught in an ice floe at New Castle and "carried almost to Fort Delaware" where she was holed by a collision with the schooner Aaron Reppard, but was towed to shoal water to prevent sinking by Ice Boat No. 3.

On January 20, 1893, Ice Boat No. 3 arrived at the Delaware Breakwater with the Reading Railroad steamer Panther in tow, which had experienced continual westerly winds and snowstorms since departing Newburyport, Massachusetts ten days earlier. Some weeks later, on the night of 7 February, Ice Boat No. 3 was towing the ship Standard past the Delaware Breakwater when the towing hawser broke, propelling the Standard into the Italian bark Giovanni anchored at the Breakwater and damaging the latter vessel to the amount of $4,000. The captain of Giovanni sued the City of Philadelphia for damages and won the ensuing court case, with the master of the ice boat found to have exercised "gross carelessness" for failing to see the Giovanni in time, and for his "sudden veering" manoeuvre which caused the hawser to catch on Standard's bobstays and snap.

In July 1896, the navy organized training exercises for the Pennsylvania Naval Militia to be held aboard USS Indiana, which was anchored off the Delaware Breakwater for the purpose. Two of Philadelphia's ice boats, No. 2 and No. 3, were recommissioned to transport the militia from Philadelphia to the Indiana, with No. 2, commanded by Lt. Stout, embarking the Pittsburgh division consisting of 66 officers and men, and No. 3, under the command of Lt.-Commander Breed, embarking the 26 officers and 88 men of the Philadelphia division. The two ice boats departed Philadelphia on the 10th, arriving at the Breakwater on the 11th where they anchored. The militiamen apparently remained aboard the ice boats until the 14th when they were taken aboard Indiana for several days of training, including gunnery, target, signals and boating practice, before being returned to the ice boats for the return journey to Philadelphia.

The winter of 1897-98 was a mild one, with only two ice boats, No. 1 and No. 2, needed to keep the ice in check from 2 to 19 January, when they were stood down. The two returned to service on the 28th, and on 3 February, they were joined by Ice Boat No. 3. On 5 February, No. 2 and No. 3 were despatched to the assistance of the steamer Pennland, which had grounded near Tinicum Island. Pennland was refloated by No. 1 and No. 2 on 7 February. By mid-February, all three ice boats had been decommissioned, the last being Ice Boat No. 3, which was decommissioned on 15 February after only thirteen days of service for the season; two of No. 3's boilers were however kept under steam until 15 March. Due to rumours of impending war with Spain, all three boats were given a thorough overhaul after decommission.

=== Spanish–American War ===
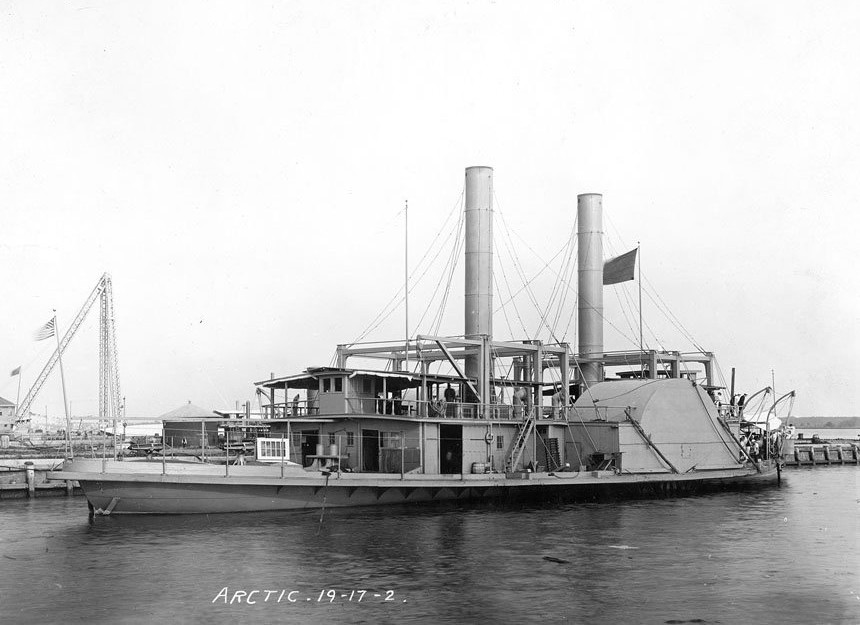
USS Arctic, formerly Ice Boat No. 3, in mid-1898. This appears to be a stern view of the vessel, showing the smaller pilothouse.

In March 1898, in anticipation of war with Spain, the U.S. Navy began preparations for the establishment of a Naval Auxiliary Force, known colloquially as the "mosquito fleet", for the defence of the United States East Coast. In the Delaware region, the Navy requested and received plans for the three Philadelphia ice boats, with a view to determining their suitability as patrol craft. The two older ice boats were deemed unsuitable, but Ice Boat No. 3 was accepted for service. On 23 April, Spain declared war on the United States in response to the latter's blockade of Cuba. On 5 May, Ice Boat No. 3, "in first-class working order", was transferred to the Navy, and on 9 May, in a display of patriotic fervour, Philadelphia's city councillors voted to lease the ice boat to the Navy indefinitely for the nominal sum of one dollar.

On 16 May, Ice Boat No. 3 was towed to the Philadelphia Naval Shipyard at League Island for conversion to naval service. A couple of days later, naval officers at the yard reportedly described the vessel as slow, unwieldy, vulnerable to shellfire, and of little apparent use militarily. Regardless, the conversion proceeded, albeit at a less than urgent pace; she was still undergoing "repairs" at the yard as late as 18 June. The conversion work included the mounting of a 60-pounder breech loading gun—converted from a Civil War Parrott rifle—and two 47 mm guns. During the time the boat was undergoing conversion, rumours circulated that she would be sent to Cuba for use as a gunboat or blockade ship, but the Navy eventually confirmed her role as a Naval Auxiliary Force coastal patrol vessel with the Fourth Lighthouse District. (Note: According to DANFS, Arctic was used as a "refrigeration ship", but there is no evidence the vessel was ever fitted with refrigeration equipment and no source has been found to corroborate this account; on the contrary, all available contemporary sources refer to her role as that of a gunboat or patrol craft. DANFS also fails to mention the ship's armament.)

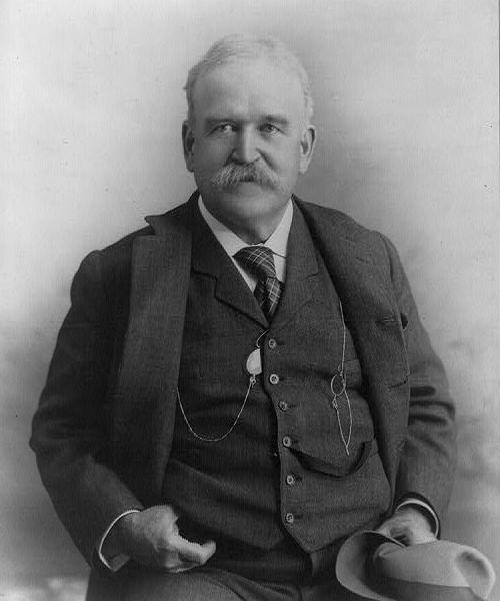
Secretary of the Navy John Davis Long personally chose Ice Boat No. 3's commissioned name

The converted ice boat was formally commissioned on 9 July 1898 as USS Arctic, the new name having been personally chosen by Secretary of the Navy John Davis Long; she was the second U.S. Navy vessel to bear the name. (Note: DANFS entries use Roman numerals to denote the iteration of a ship name; the iteration in this case is denoted by the numerals "II".) The newly commissioned vessel was manned by six officers and 58 men from the Pennsylvania Naval Reserve, Philadelphia division, Lt. George C. Stout in command. Three additional crew members, from the Philadelphia City Ice Boat Department, were given temporary naval commissions as Assistant Engineer, First-class Machinist and Second-class Machinist respectively.

USS Arctic appears to have made only one voyage for the Navy, to the Delaware Breakwater and back, via New Castle and Lewes, between 28 July and 16 August, but whether this constituted a formal patrol or some other mission is unclear. On 5 August she dragged anchor and stranded just inside Cape Henlopen during a gale. She was pulled off the beach by a tug without damage. Arctic was decommissioned on 23 August 1898, reconverted to her "original condition", and on 13 September, returned to the City Ice Boat Department, where she resumed her former title of Ice Boat No. 3. The three members of the Department given temporary naval commissions also received their discharges between 1 and 16 September and were reinstated in their previous positions.

Following the cessation of hostilities between Spain and the United States in August, a "Peace Jubilee" including a naval review was held at the port of Philadelphia on 25 October. All three ice boats participated, with No. 1 and No. 2 placed at the disposal of the review committee and their guests, and Ice Boat No. 3 assigned to representatives of the press and their families.

=== Return to municipal service, 1899 ===
==== Icebreaking ====
The winter of 1899 on the Delaware began mildly, but a cold snap and heavy snow falls from 7 February led to the rapid formation of thick ice. Ice Boats No. 1 and No. 2 were recommissioned on 8 February and Ice Boat No. 3 returned to service on the 10th. On Sunday 11 February, Ice Boat No. 3 was engaged in icebreaking all day during a snow storm. The following Tuesday, Ice Boat No. 3 set out from Philadelphia and Ice Boat No. 1 from New Castle, the ice having attained a thickness of "10 inches ... [with] 19 inches of snow on top". The two vessels met the next day off Fort Mifflin, having thus reopened the port. Ice Boat No. 3 then continued on to the Breakwater, there supplying the steamship Belgenland with 40 tons of coal, and towing to the Breakwater the oyster schooner Annie Cooney—abandoned off the Brandywine Light—before escorting several steamers to Philadelphia, arriving late on the 17th. On Sunday the 19th, the three ice boats collectively assisted sixteen steamers to arrive or depart the city's port.

With the weather improving, ice boats No. 1 and No. 2 were decommissioned on the 25th and 26th respectively and laid up. Ice Boat No. 3 was decommissioned on the 27th, though fires were retained under her boilers until 15 March, when she too was laid up, having spent a total of 18 days in commission through the winter.

==== Dewey Day ====
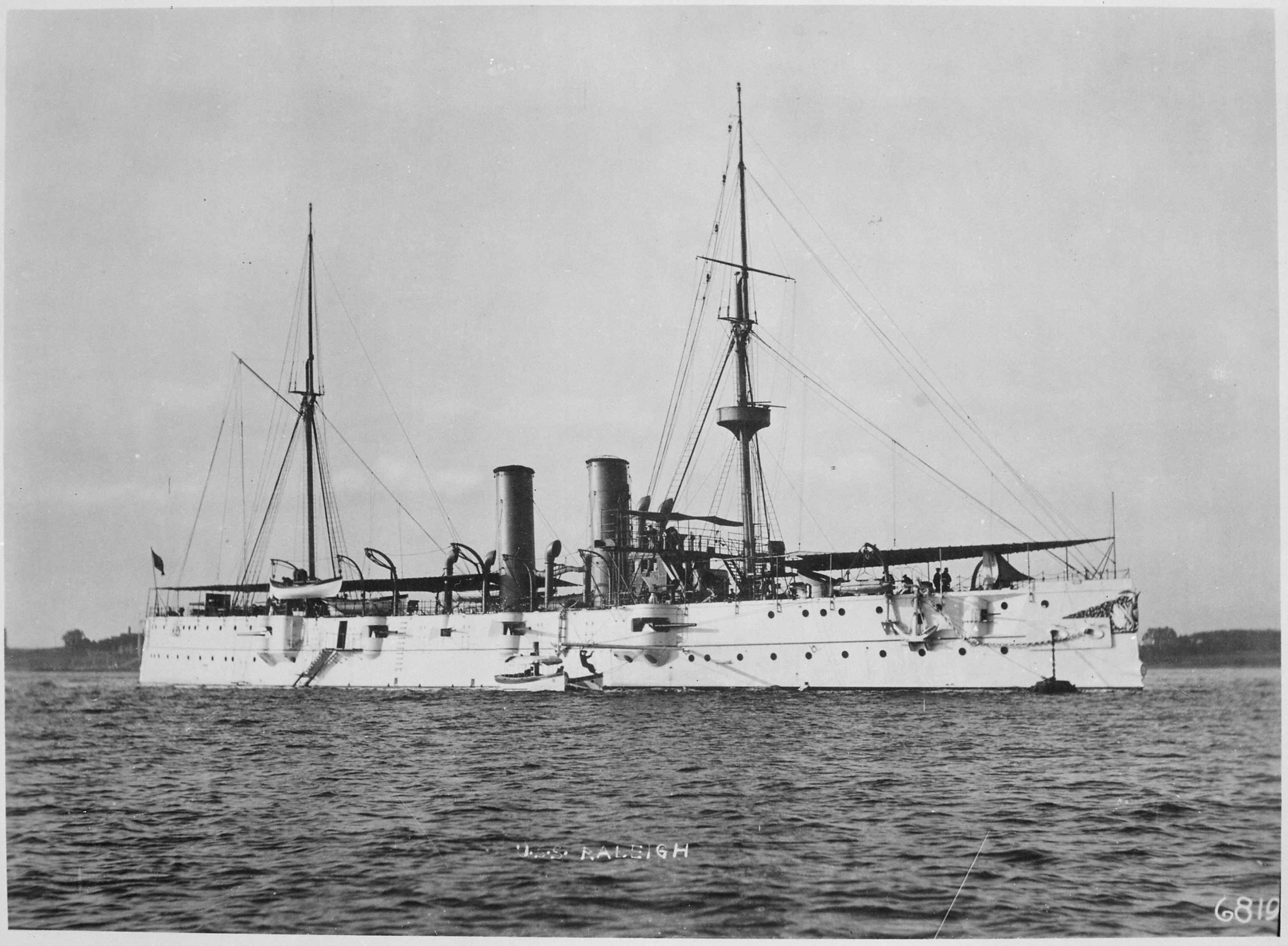
USS Raleigh was the centerpiece of Philadelphia's naval parade on "Dewey Day"

The first of May was declared "Dewey Day" in the U.S., in honor of the first anniversary of Admiral George Dewey's victory over Spanish forces at Manila Bay, Philippines, the previous year. Celebrations were held throughout the United States, the largest of which took place in Philadelphia, where the state governor declared a public holiday and a naval parade on the Delaware was organized, featuring USS Raleigh, the cruiser credited with firing the first shot in the Battle of Manila Bay. Ice Boat No. 3 was recommissioned for the day, embarking 475 passengers—mostly city councillors and their friends— from Arch Street at 1:15 pm and proceeding to League Island, the parade's designated starting point, where lunch was served aboard the boats.

The parade set out at 2:30 pm with the tug McCaulley acting as flagship followed by two police boats; however, at the insistence of Commodore Adams, (Note: An apparent reference to Josiah R. Adams, a prominent Philadelphia judge and political identity.) Ice Boat No. 3 was given pride of place behind McCaulley due to the former's complement of councillors. The parade then steamed upriver to the Arch Street wharf where it circled the anchored Raleigh, to the cheers of thousands of onlookers ashore, after which guests from the various watercraft were invited aboard the cruiser for an inspection. Festivities ended about 4:15, about which time Ice Boat No. 3 returned her passengers to their embarkation point before proceeding to her usual berth at the House of Corrections wharf, arriving there 6:15 pm.

From 27 May to 1 June, Ice Boat No. 3 was drydocked at William Cramp & Sons, where her hull was cleaned and repainted. More repairs were made during the summer, including replacement of worn or defective hand rails and decking, and scaling and painting of the boiler room.

==== Grand Army Day ====
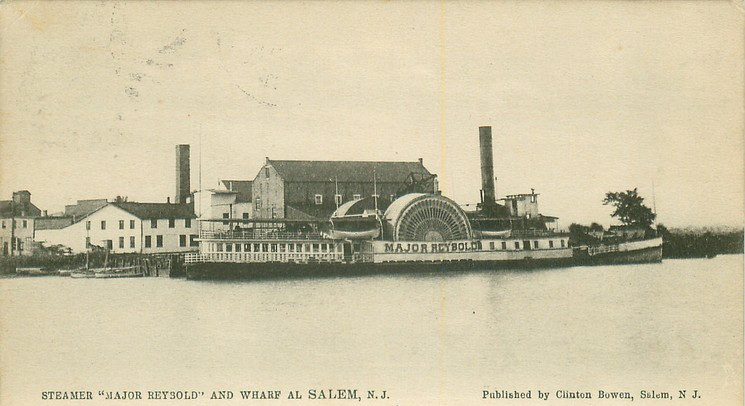
The passenger steamboat Major Reybold, one of two steamboats involved in collisions with Ice Boat No. 3 on Grand Army Day, 1899

On 8 September, Ice Boat No. 3, along with the other two ice boats, participated in a naval parade in honor of the Grand Army of the Republic. Ice Boat No. 3, skippered by Captain Henry E. Melville, superintendent of the city ice boats, embarked guests from Pier 3, South Wharves at 10:30 am. While leaving the Chestnut Street dock to join the parade, No. 3 collided with the steamboat John A. Warner, striking the latter "about fifteen feet from her stern, cutting through her plank sheer and clear into her deck." Declining to stop and inquire after damages, the ice boat continued up the river, where she suffered a second collision, this time with the passenger-cargo steamboat Major Reybold which had just reversed out of dock, damaging the ice boat's starboard guard and Major Reybold's stem. Again failing to stop, No. 3 continued on to the parade starting point at Fort Mifflin. After the parade was over, the guests were returned by the ice boat to Chestnut St. wharf about 4:15 pm, the vessel then continuing on to her usual berth at the House of Correction dock, arriving 6:15 pm. In a subsequent court case, the owners of Major Reybold sued for $1,425 in damages.

In October, all three ice boats had their hulls, upper and lower decks and smokestacks repainted.

=== 1900–1901 ===
On 20 June 1900, members of the Allied Republican Clubs were treated to a "complimentary river excursion" on the Delaware by local club members. A fleet of nine watercraft, including all three of the city's ice boats, was organized for the excursion, which began at 12:15 and included an inspection of the Cramp & Sons shipyard on the way to Holmesburg and Fort Mifflin. Onboard refreshments and music were provided for the excursionists, who were returned to their departure points at around 5 pm.

The 1901 winter season began mildly, but a sudden drop in temperatures in February led to some of the worst conditions on the Delaware in memory. Ice Boat No. 3 was placed in commission on 5 February, the other two ice boats re-entering service on the 6th and 8th respectively. Ice Boat No. 3 spent most of the night of the 5th clearing ice in the Horseshoe, (Note: City Ice Boat Dept. reports frequently refer to a section of the Delaware River as "the Shoe" or "the Horseshoe", where ice often clogged the river. While the location of this section is uncertain, it probably refers to the bend in the river just below the southwest corner of Philadelphia.) and on 7 February, No. 2 and No. 3 successfully refloated the steamer Switzerland, ashore on Chester Island. In the afternoon of 21 February No. 3 refloated the barge Baker, aground in the Shoe, and on 26 February refloated the ship Bangalore, ashore at Cherry Island Flats. The following day, the three ice boats worked together in the Horseshoe to free 21 vessels trapped in ice, and on 1 March, another 41 vessels were freed by the ice boats. With conditions rapidly improving, Ice Boat No. 1 was decommissioned on 6 March, followed by No. 2 and No. 3 on 7 and 9 March respectively, the crews of all three boats being paid and discharged and the boats returned to the City Ice Boat Dept. caretakers in accordance with standard procedure. Of the three ice boats, No. 3 spent the longest time in commission for the season, recording 34 days in full commission and another 40 days in commission with half crew.

In the summer off-season, Ice Boat No. 3 was again drydocked at the Cramp shipyard for the hull to be scraped and painted with red lead; the hull was found to be in good condition below the waterline. Minor repairs, including repairs to the donkey boiler, guards and rails were also completed by Neafie & Levy. The inner hull was scraped, sealed and coated with red lead during the summer by the Ice Boat Dept. caretakers, who also ground the engine valves, cleaned the boilers and "shedded over" the decks for protection from the summer sun. The Department's end-of-year annual report noted that the decks of all three ice boats required renewal, as they were leaking and had "been patched so often that but little of the original decks remain".

=== 1902–1904 ===
The ice boats resumed work on the river in mid-January 1902 when Ice Boat No. 1 re-entered service, followed by No. 3 on 4 February and No. 2 on the 5th. On 6 February, Ice Boat No. 3 towed the bark Quivilly from Newcastle to the Breakwater, and the following day towed the bark Virginna Della Guardia to Newcastle on the return journey. Conditions on the river were at their most severe between 9 and 13 February, when the three ice boats operated together to assist no fewer than fifty vessels through the Horseshoe. The ice boats remained in continuous service until 24 February, No. 3 being decommissioned on 27 February and the other two the following day, the three having been in service for the season a total of 38 days. Through the summer, the boats were again cleaned and repainted by their caretakers. Ice Boat No. 3 was also given an overhaul at the Neafie & Levy shipyard, which included repairs to her engine, boilers, guards, wheels and decks.

The winter 1904 season arrived early, with the ice boat already in service by early January. On 8 January, during a snowstorm, Ice Boat No. 3, with the assistance of the tug Sommers N. Smith, refloated the Norwegian steamship Kate, which had gone ashore in Delaware Bay while outward bound from Philadelphia to Puerto Rico; Kate was towed the same day to Wilmington, Delaware, for repairs. On 10 February, Ice Boat No. 3 was sent to the assistance of several tugs attempting to refloat the British steamer Craigneuk, which had grounded near Reedy Island on her way from Leith to Philadelphia.

Some time after the end of the 1904 winter season, the City Ice Boat Department requested permission from the city council to prepare plans for a $110,000 rebuild of Ice Boat No. 3 as "her boilers and hull were worn out" and she could not be expected to continue in service beyond the next winter.

=== 1905 ===
The winter of 1905 was a long and severe one on the Delaware. No. 3 was again the first of the ice boats to resume service, re-entering commission on 6 January with a full crew and being despatched immediately to Newcastle following a sudden fall in temperature two days earlier. On 8 January, No. 3 convoyed the cruiser USS Denver from League Island to Reedy Island, and the following day Ice Boat No. 1 also returned to service, the two ice boats working more or less continuously until being joined by No. 2 on the 20th. From this date, the three ice boats worked mostly on their regular stations until 4 February, assisting 44 vessels in this period, including 18 steamers on 3 February.

==== Loss ====
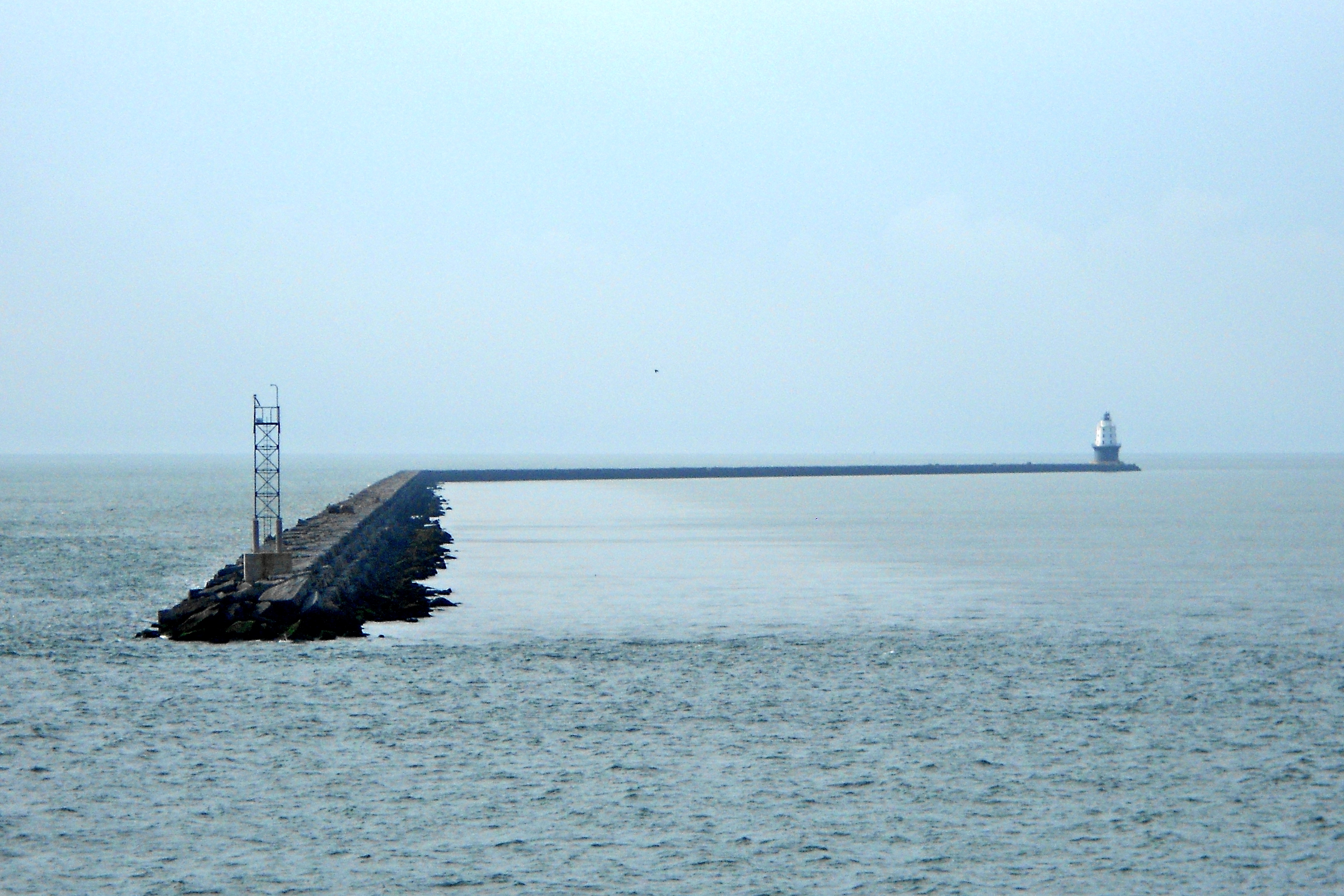
A breakwater in the National Harbor of Refuge

At 5 am on 5 February, Ice Boat No. 3, under the command of Captain W. F. P. Jacobs, arrived at the Delaware Breakwater "under orders to convey a fleet of ice-bound steamers, tugs, barges and schooners up to Philadelphia." In the National Harbor of Refuge between the two breakwaters, No. 3's paddlewheels became jammed by ice, and unable to maneouver, the vessel was dragged by the ice floes over a recently sunken barge, the Santiago, one of whose broken masts pierced the ice boat's hull below the waterline. Within minutes, water had extinguished No. 3's furnaces and the order was given to abandon ship. Unable to launch a lifeboat because of the surrounding ice, the crew were forced to leap for safety onto the ice floes, the ice boat sinking shortly thereafter, at about 6 am.

Stranded on the floes, and in "imminent danger" of drifting out to sea, the ice boat's crew tried desperately for four hours to raise the alarm until finally being sighted from shore. Five tug boats, Gettysburg, Teaser, Bonner, Sommers Smith and North America were quickly sent to their aid, Gettysburg arriving first to pick up ten of the crew, while Teaser and Bonner picked up most of the rest. The remaining two crew members, who had become separated from the others, were rescued by the tug Sommers Smith. All 31 crew members were rescued, though the ice boat's firemen, thinly clothed for their work in the engine room, had suffered both steam scalds and exposure from the cold during their ordeal.

Within days of the sinking, the Ice Boat Department had leased the Philadelphia & Reading Railway Company's oceangoing tug International at the rate of $100 a day as a temporary replacement for Ice Boat No. 3. From 5 February to the 27th, the three vessels employed by the Department assisted no fewer than 262 vessels through the ice, making a total of 306 vessels assisted through the season.

With the arrival of spring, arrangements were made for removal of the sunken barge Santiago and Ice Boat No. 3, both of which had become hazards to navigation, and contracts for removal of the two vessels were signed on 20 March. Removal of Santiago was completed by 11 April 1906 at a cost of $354.77; removal of the sunken ice boat proved more difficult and was completed 4 August 1905 for the sum of $5,168.97.

To replace Ice Boat No. 3, the Department ordered a modern icebreaker from William Cramp & Sons at a cost of $350,000. Said to be "the most powerful icebreaker ever constructed" in the United States, and able to do the work of two of the older ice boats combined, the new icebreaker, named John Weaver after the Mayor of Philadelphia, entered service in time for the winter of 1906. The new icebreaker eventually became known as Ice Boat No. 3 after her predecessor.
