= Resource (ship) =

Several vessels have been named Resource:

- Resource (1798 ship) was launched at Bermuda in 1792 and sailed from Liverpool from 1798 on. She made four voyages as a slave ship. She was captured in 1805 at the very beginning of her fifth voyage.
- Resource (1804 ship) was launched in Calcutta as a country ship; that is, she traded out of India but only east of the Cape of Good Hope. In 1807 the French captured her, but she returned to British ownership. She participated as a transport in the British invasion of Java. After 1813 she traded between Britain and India under a license from the British East India Company (EIC). From about the mid-1830s she traded primarily between Britain and Australia, and in 1839 she transported immigrants to South Australia. In 1843 she started sailing between Britain and Quebec until December 1846 when her crew had to abandon her at sea while on a voyage back to Britain from Quebec.
- Resource (1805 ship) was launched at Whitby in 1805. She was lost in 1810.

== See also ==
- HMS Resource – one of three vessels of the British Royal Navy by that name
- RFA Resource (A480), an armament stores ship of the Royal Fleet Auxiliary launched in 1966, renamed Resourceful for the delivery voyage to the Indian breakers and scrapped in 1997.
