= Bangalore Stadium =

Bangalore Stadium may refer to any of the three stadiums located in Bangalore, India:

- Sree Kanteerava Stadium, a multi-purpose stadium
- Chinnaswamy Stadium, a cricket stadium
- Bangalore Football Stadium
