= Rambler (1803 ship) =

French Ship

History

United Kingdom
- Name: Rambler
- Acquired: 1803 by purchasse
- Captured: circa November 1807

General characteristics
- Tons burthen: 243 (bm)
- Complement: 50
- Armament: 1803: 18 × 9&6-pounder guns; 1806: 18 × 9-pounder guns

Rambler was a ship built in France and taken in prize in 1797. However, she did not appear under the name Rambler until 1803 when William Bennett purchased her for use as a whaler. He may, therefore, have renamed her. She made three complete voyages as a whaler. A French privateer captured her in 1807 as Rambler was returning from her fourth whaling voyage.

== Career ==
Captain Thomas Richards acquired a letter of marque on 25 May 1803, shortly after the resumption of war with France. The extent of her armament and the size of her crew suggests that her owners may have contemplated sailing her as a privateer. The first mention of her in 1803 in Lloyd's List's (LL) ship arrival and departure (SAD) data shows her sailing to the South Seas.

Daniel Bennett, of Rotherhithe, a shipowner (primarily of whalers), and merchant, purchased her.

1st whaling voyage (1803–1804): Captain Richards sailed from England on 16 June 1803. LL reported on 13 December that Rambler, of London had captured a French whaler and sent her into St Helena. The "Rambler (Whaler)" arrived at St Helena on 1 October. She was off Portsmouth on 9 July 1804 and arrived in London on 13 July 1804. She had left St Helena on 4 May, having come from the South Seas. She was in company with a number of other whalers from St Helena and was reported to be full. On 8 July a French privateer lugger of 16 guns approached but sheered off when she saw that some of the whalers were well-armed.

2nd whaling voyage (1804–1805): Captain William Watson sailed on 3 September 1804, bound for the South Seas. He returned on 18 June 1805.

Rambler first appeared in the Register of Shipping RS in 1806.

Year	Master	Owner	Trade	Source
1806	W.Elder	D.Bennet	London–Southern Fishery	RS

3rd whaling voyage (1805–1806): One source gives her master as William Elder. Another states that Captain John Marshall sailed in August 1805 for the South Seas. Rambler returned on 13 July 1806. Lloyd's List's SAD data has no information to resolve the issue.

== Fate ==
Captain John Marshall sailed Rambler from London on 9 August 1806, bound for the South Seas on her 4th whaling voyage.

On 21 November 1807 Rambler, Marshall, master, was returning to England from the South Seas when a French privateer captured her.
