= List of shipwrecks in April 1874 =

The list of shipwrecks in April 1874 includes ships sunk, foundered, grounded, or otherwise lost during April 1874.

== 1 April ==
List of shipwrecks: 1 April 1874
Ship	State	Description
Arbitrator	United Kingdom	The steamship caught fire at Liverpool, Lancashire.
Atlantic	United Kingdom	The ship foundered with the loss of all twenty crew. Wreckage washed up on the coast of Cornwall in August.
Everdina	United Kingdom	The ship departed from Sunderland, County Durham for Stockholm, Sweden. No further trace, presumed foundered with the loss of all hands.
Jarvis Lord	United States	The steamship was damaged at Chicago, Illinois.
Kron Prinz	Germany	The steamship grounded on the outside of a narrow channel around a tight bend, whilst entering the River Avon. Then fell over as the tide ebbed, and blocked the river channel. She was on a voyage from Sulina, Ottoman Empire to Bristol, Gloucestershire, United Kingdom. Demasted to clear the channel, then refloated on 21 April and repaired.
Margaret and Mary	United Kingdom	The brig was wrecked in the Rio de la Hacha.
Sir William Stamer	United Kingdom	The brigantine ran aground and capsized in the Castletown River. She was on a voyage from Silloth, Cumberland to Dundalk, County Louth.

== 2 April ==
List of shipwrecks: 2 April 1874
Ship	State	Description
Belvedere	United Kingdom	The ship was wrecked at Sandside, Caithness.
Europe	France	The steamship sprang a leak and was abandoned in the Atlantic Ocean. All 379 people board on were rescued by the steamship Greece (United Kingdom), which took Europe in tow, but she sank on 4 April. Greece collided with Europe and was damaged at the stern.
Expedition	France	The schooner was driven ashore and wrecked near Flekkefjord, Norway with the loss of a crew member. She was on a voyage from Blyth, Northumberland, United Kingdom to Christiania, Norway.
Flora	United Kingdom	The ship was driven ashore at Lemvig, Denmark with the loss of all hands.
Sadowa	Italy	The barque ran aground in the Rangoon River. She was refloated and put back to Rangoon, Burma.
Western Wave	United Kingdom	The ship departed from Lisbon, Portugal for Hull, Yorkshire. No further trace, presumed foundered with the loss of all hands.

== 3 April ==
List of shipwrecks: 3 April 1874
Ship	State	Description
British Lion	United Kingdom	The ship struck the quayside at Saint John, New Brunswick, Canada and partially sank. She was on a voyage from Montevideo, Uruguay to Saint John.
Hannah G.	United Kingdom	The schooner was driven ashore on North Uist, Outer Hebrides.
Merlin	United Kingdom	The steamship sank in the River Thames near London Bridge. All on board were rescued.
Wilhelm Aberg	(Russian Empire) Grand Duchy of Finland	The barque was wrecked on Scarba, Argyllshire, United Kingdom with the loss of fifteen of her eighteen crew. She was on a voyage from Portugal to Porvoo.

== 4 April ==
List of shipwrecks: 4 April 1874
Ship	State	Description
Amalia	Norway	The ship was abandoned in the North Sea. Her crew were rescued. She was on a voyage from Christiania to Bo'ness, Lothian, United Kingdom.
Kate	United Kingdom	The brig foundered in the Atlantic Ocean off Loop Head, County Clare with the loss of all hands. She was on a voyage from Cardiff, Glamorgan to Limerick.
Madras	France	The barque foundered in the Atlantic Ocean. Her crew were rescued by Everhard (Germany). Madras was on a voyage from Swansea, Glamorgan to Cádiz, Spain.
Onward	United Kingdom	The ship foundered in the Atlantic Ocean. Her eight crew were rescued by Charles Jackson (United Kingdom). Onward was on a voyage from Cardiff, Glamorgan to Tenerife, Canary Islands.
Victoria Nyanza	United Kingdom	The ship was driven ashore and wrecked at Le Touquet, Pas-de-Calais, France with the loss of three of her 26 crew. She was on a voyage from Calcutta, India to London.

== 6 April ==
List of shipwrecks: 6 April 1874
Ship	State	Description
Bella Vicenta	Spain	The steamship was wrecked at Figueira da Foz, Portugal. Her crew were rescued. She was on a voyage from Villajoyosa to Villa Garcia.
Geraldine	United Kingdom	The abandoned ship was discovered in the Atlantic Ocean by Lindesnaes (Norway), which put four of her crew aboard. They took her in to Falmouth, Cornwall.
H. E. Moller	Norway	The ship departed from Havre de Grâce, Seine-Inférieure, France for Quebec City, Canada. She may have been sighted a week later, but after that no further trace, presumed foundered with the loss of all hands.
Myrtle	United Kingdom	The ship departed from The Downs for Palermo, Sicily, Italy. No further trace, presumed foundered with the loss of all hands.
Nymphœa	United Kingdom	The steamship ran aground on the Shipwash Sand, in the North Sea off the coast of Suffolk. She was on a voyage from South Shields, County Durham to Rochester, Kent. She was refloated and resumed her voyage.
Raven	United Kingdom	The ship departed from Cardiff, Glamorgan for Lisbon, Portugal. No further trace, presumed foundered with the loss of all hands.
Unnamed	Flag unknown	The ship collided with the steamship Lusitania (United Kingdom) and sank with the loss of all hands.

== 7 April ==
List of shipwrecks: 7 April 1874
Ship	State	Description
Braemar Castle	United Kingdom	The ship ran aground in the Hooghly River.
''Leda, Leader, or Leander	United Kingdom	The schooner foundered off Ouessant, Finistère, France. Her seven crew were rescued by the schooner Swell (United Kingdom). "Leda" was on a voyage from the River Tyne to Smyrna, Ottoman Empire.
Speedwell	United Kingdom	The ship departed from Cardiff, Glamorgan for Malta. No further trace, presumed foundered with the loss of all hands.
Student	United Kingdom	The steamship ran aground in the Danube 39 nautical miles (72 km) from Sulina, Ottoman Empire.
Water Lily	United Kingdom	The Norfolk Punt caught the rigging of a sloop and capsized in the North Sea off Pakefield, Suffolk. Her three crew were rescued by the sloop.

== 8 April ==
List of shipwrecks: 8 April 1874
Ship	State	Description
Atlantic	United Kingdom	The ship departed from Holyhead for Aden. No further trace, presumed foundered with the loss of all hands.
Flora	Norway	The derelict ship was driven ashore near Ringkøbing, Denmark.
Helene	United Kingdom	The schooner was taken in to Grimsby, Lincolnshire in a derelict condition.
Unicorn	United Kingdom	The schooner was driven ashore at the Point of Ayre, Isle of Man and was abandoned by her crew. She was refloated and taken in to Ramsey, Isle of Man.
Vincent Charlotte	Belgium	The lugger was run into by a brig and sank in the North Sea. Her crew survived.

== 9 April ==
List of shipwrecks: 9 April 1874
Ship	State	Description
Hyaline	United Kingdom	The ship departed from Tor Bay for Guadeloupe. No further trace, presumed foundered with the loss of all hands.
Irene	United Kingdom	The ship was driven ashore at Garliestown, Wigtownshire. She was on a voyage from Maryport, Cumberland to Dublin.
Liberator	United Kingdom	The schooner ran aground at Ballyhack, County Waterford. She was refloated on 12 April.
May Queen	United Kingdom	The ship departed from the River Tyne for Cartagena, Spain. No further trace, presumued foundered with the loss of all hands.
Minnie	United Kingdom	The ketch was driven ashore at Ryde, Isle of Wight. She was on a voyage from Newcastle upon Tyne, Northumberland to Bideford, Devon. She was refloated.
Rose Marie	France	The lugger was driven ashore at Ryde. She was on a voyage from Dunkirk, Nord to Brest, Finistère.

== 10 April ==
List of shipwrecks: 10 April 1874
Ship	State	Description
Barton	United Kingdom	The steamship departed from Greenock, Renfrewshire for Licata, Sicily, Italy. No further trace, presumed foundered with the loss of all hands.
Enterprise	United Kingdom	The schooner was driven ashore at St Combs, Aberdeenshire. She was on a voyage from Inverness to Newcastle upon Tyne, Northumberland. She was refloated and taken in to Fraserburgh, Aberdeenshire in a severely damaged condition.

== 11 April ==
List of shipwrecks: 11 April 1874
Ship	State	Description
Affiance	United Kingdom	The barque was driven ashore at Sines, Portugal. Her crew survived. She was on a voyage from Sines to Riga, Russia.
Liberia	United Kingdom	The steamship departed from Liverpool, Lancashire for Madeira. Presumed foundered with the loss of all 53 people on board. Wreckage from the ship was discovered 200 nautical miles (370 km) south west of the Isles of Scilly.
Pontiac	Canada	The ship was sighted off the Isle of Wight, United Kingdom whilst on a voyage from Sunderland, County Durham, United Kingdom to Bombay, India. No further trace, presumed foundered with the loss of all hands.

== 12 April ==
List of shipwrecks: 12 April 1874
Ship	State	Description
Freya	Germany	The schooner foundered in the North Sea. Her crew were rescued by the barque Reform (Norway).
Hampton	United Kingdom	The brig ran aground on the Bull Sand, in the Irish Sea off the coast of County Dublin with the loss of two of her five crew. Survivors were rescued by a cutter and a gig from Princess Alexandra ( (England) Commissioners of Irish Lights).
Jules de Rontaunay	France	The ship departed from Cardiff, Glamorgan, United Kingdom for Bahia, Brazil. No further trace, presumed foundered with the loss of all hands.

== 13 April ==
List of shipwrecks: 13 April 1874
Ship	State	Description
Bedwelthy	United Kingdom	The schooner was severely damaged in a gale in the Isles of Scilly.
Bordelaise	United Kingdom	The steamship ran aground on The Hats, in the Isles of Scilly.
Concettina	Italy	The brig was driven ashore at Messina, Sicily. She was on a voyage from Cardiff, Glamorgan, United Kingdom to Messina.
Diana, and Sevilla	Netherlands; Norway	The schooners collided in the North Sea (56°32′N 5°02′E) and both sank, Diana with the loss of all hands. Sevilla was on a voyage from Alloa, Clackmannanshire, United Kingdom to Stockholm, Sweden. Her crew were rescued by the schooner Rapid (Sweden).
Freya	Germany	The schooner foundered in the North Sea. Her crew were rescued by the barque Reform (Norway).
Hampshire	United Kingdom	The steamship ran aground at Havre de Grâce, Seine-Inférieure. She was on a voyage from Cardiff to Havre de Grâce. She was refloated.
Kate Dawson	United Kingdom	The smack was driven ashore on "Pell Island". Her crew were rescued. She was on a voyage from Cork to Kenmare, County Kerry.
Lorely	United Kingdom	The steamship ran aground at Landskrona, Sweden. She was on a voyage from the River Tyne to Malmö, Sweden. She was refloated and resumed her voyage.
Nelly	United Kingdom	The schooner was driven ashore and destroyed by fire at Brandon, County Kerry. Her crew were rescued.
Niels	(flag) Denmark	The ship struck Inchcape, Fife, United Kingdom. She was on a voyage from Falkenberg, Sweden to Grangemouth, Stirlingshire, United Kingdom. She was refloated and put in to the River Tay in a waterlopgged condition.
Pulteney	United Kingdom	The schooner ran aground near Moville, County Donegal. She was on a voyage from Glasgow, Renfrewshire to Londonderry. She was refloated but found to be severely leaky and was beached.
Sylvester	Germany	The schooner ran aground off "Vibesund". She was on a voyage from Uddevalla, Sweden to the Firth of Forth. She was a total loss.
Ville de Cardiff	France	The ship was driven ashore near Camaret-sur-Mer, Finistère. She was consequently condemned.
Unnamed	Flag unknown	The ship was driven ashore and wrecked at Clontarf, County Dublin, United Kingdom.

== 14 April ==
List of shipwrecks: 14 April 1874
Ship	State	Description
Alma	Norway	The barque was wrecked on the Sizewell Bank, in the North Sea off the coast of Suffolk, United Kingdom. All thirteen people on board were rescued by the Thorpeness Lifeboat Ipswich and the Southwold Lifeboat Coal Exchange (both ( Royal National Lifeboat Institution).
Almont Powell	United States	The ship was driven from her anchorage in the Kingroad, off the coast of Somerset, United Kingdom and was beached. She was on a voyage from New York to "Morgan's Pill".
Amérique	France	The steamship was abandoned in the Atlantic Ocean off Ouessant, Finistère with the loss of one of the 235 people on board. Survivors were rescued by Aladdin (Norway), the barque Elisa Quirolo (Italy) and the barque Michigan (United Kingdom). Amérique was on a voyage from New York to Havre de Grâce, Seine-Inférieure. She was later found adrift at sea by the steamship Spray (United Kingdom), which had been sent to look for her, and which towed her to Plymouth, Devon, United Kingdom with assistance from the steamship F. T. Barry and the steam tender Sir Francis Drake (both United Kingdom). She was pumped dry, repaired, and returned to service.
Arthur	United Kingdom	The barque foundered in the Atlantic Ocean with the loss of one of her 22 crew. Survivors were rescued by Otago (New Zealand). Arthur was on a voyage from Cardiff, Glamorgan to Quebec City, Canada. She foundered was discovered on 17 April by the steamship Violet (United Kingdom), which witnessed her founder on 19 April.
Baltic	United Kingdom	The Mersey Flat sank at Birkenhead, Cheshire.
Barrow	United Kingdom	The schooner was driven ashore and sank at Goodwick, Pembrokeshire. Her crew were rescued by the Goodwick Lifeboat.
Carolina	Sweden	The schooner was driven ashore at Stege, Denmark. Her crew were rescued. She was on a voyage from Valdemarsvik to Holtenau, Germany.
Excel	United Kingdom	The brigantine was run into by the barque Anglo-Indian (United Kingdom) and sank in the Bay of Biscay 50 nautical miles (93 km) off Cape Finisterre, Spain with the loss of her captain. Excel was on a voyage from Swansea, Glamorgan to Barcelona, Spain.
Fanny Buller	United Kingdom	The ship .
Fede	Italy	The barque foundered at sea. Her crew were rescued by the barque Amelie Barthe (France). Fede was on a voyage from Greenock, Renfrewshire to Genoa.
Gem	United Kingdom	The pilot cutter was driven ashore and wrecked in the Isles of Scilly.
Glad Tidings	United Kingdom	The ship was driven ashore on "Ferret Island", County Kerry with the loss of all but one of her crew. She was on a voyage from Clarecastle, County Kerry to Cardiff.
Goedhart	Belgium	The ship was driven ashore on Goos Island, off Rügen, Germany. Her crew were rescued. She was on a voyage from Antwerp to Stockholm, Sweden.
Gottenburg	Sweden	The barque was abandoned off St. Agnes, Cornwall, United Kingdom. Her twenty crew were rescued by the Newquay Lifeboat. Gottenburg was on a voyage from Batavia, Netherlands East Indies to Glasgow, Renfrewshire, United Kingdom. She was towed in to Falmouth, Cornwall by a tug.
Holland	Netherlands	The steamship was driven ashore at Suez, Egypt. She was refloated and resumed her voyage.
Jubilee	United Kingdom	The tug caught fire and sank in the River Tyne at Jarrow, County Durham.
Laura	United Kingdom	The schooner collided with the steamship Risca (United Kingdom) and sank in the Sloyne. Her crew were rescued. Laura was on a voyage from Par, Cornwall to Runcorn, Cheshire.
Laura	Norway	The barque was wrecked at Brandon, County Kerry. Her crew were rescued.
Lively Queen	United Kingdom	The schooner was wrecked near Cahirsiveen, County Kerry. Her crew were rescued.
Marie Anne	France	The ship was driven ashore at Camaret-sur-Mer, Finistère. She was on a voyage from Bordeaux, Gironde to Weymouth, Dorset, United Kingdom.
Merryandrew	United Kingdom	The tug was driven ashore and wrecked at Penmon, Anglesey. She was refloated on 18 April and beached at Beaumaris, Anglesey for repairs.
Minnie	United Kingdom	The ketch was abandoned off Clovelly, Devon. Her four crew were rescued by the Clovelly Lifeboat Alexander and Matilda Boetefour ( Royal National Lifeboat Institution). Minnie was on a voyage from Newcastle upon Tyne, Northumberland to Bideford, Devon.
Quickstep	United Kingdom	The schooner was driven ashore and wrecked on Valentia Island, County Kerry. Her crew were rescued. She was on a voyage from Kinvara, County Kerry to Penarth, Glamorgan.
Runnymede	United Kingdom	The ship was damaged by fire at Pernambuco, Brazil. She was on a voyage from London to Brisbane, Queensland.
T. T. S.	United Kingdom	The schooner was wrecked at Goodwick, Pembrokeshire. Her crew were rescued by the Goodwick Lifeboat. She was on a voyage from Barrow-in-Furness, Lancashire to Newport, Monmouthshire.
Two unnamed vessels	France	The ships were driven ashore near Camaret-sur-Mer.
Two unnamed vessels	Flags unknown	The ships were wrecked at Arcachon, Gironde with the loss of all hands.
Unnamed	United Kingdom	The steamship was wrecked on the Grande Basse, off Portsall, Finistère with the loss of all hands.

== 15 April ==
List of shipwrecks: 15 April 1874
Ship	State	Description
Antje	Germany	The ship was driven ashore at Thisted, Denmark. Her crew were rescued. She was on a voyage from Bremen to Saint Petersburg, Russia.
Aurora	Norway	The ship was abandoned in the Atlantic Ocean. Her crew were rescued by Scotia (United States). Aurora was on a voyage from Pensacola, Florida, United States to Liverpool, Lancashire, United Kingdom.
Carlin Craig	United Kingdom	The ship was driven ashore and wrecked near St. Jago de Cuba, Cuba. She was on a voyage from Troon, Ayrshire to St. Jago de Cuba.
Clifford	United Kingdom	The steamship foundered in the Atlantic Ocean off Ouessant, Finistère, France with the loss of nine of her crew. Survivors were rescued by the schooner Julien Gabrielle (France). Clifford was on a voyage from Millwall, Middlesex to Palermo, Sicily, Italy.
Cornubia	United Kingdom	The steamship was wrecked at Cape St. Vincent, Portugal with the loss of two of her twenty crew. She was on a voyage from Cardiff, Glamorgan to Palermo, Sicily, Italy.
Johanna	Germany	The schooner was abandoned in the Atlantic Ocean. All on board were rescued by Spring (United Kingdom). Johanna was on a voyage from Safi, Morocco to Falmouth, Cornwall, United Kingdom.
Orion	United Kingdom	The brig was abandoned in the North Sea. Her crew were rescued by Alberdina (Netherlands). Orion was on a voyage from Hartlepool, County Durham to Hamburg, Germany.
Puck	United Kingdom	The schooner was wrecked on The Manacles, Cornwall. Her five crew survived. She was on a voyage from London to Whitehaven, Cumberland.
Risca	United Kingdom	The steamship ran aground in the River Mersey. She was refloated.
Rosa Bonheur	United Kingdom	The ship collided with the schooner J. H. Lubken (Germany) and sank in the Atlantic Ocean (47°30′N 8°00′W). Her crew were rescued by J. H. Lubken and the schooner Johanna (Germany). Rosa Bonheur was on a voyage from Swansea, Glamorgan to Seville, Spain.
Sir Robert Peel	Norway	The barque was driven ashore and wrecked at Dungeness, Kent, United Kingdom. Her crew were rescued by the Coastguard and the tug Lord Warden (United Kingdom). She was on a voyage from Christiania to Shoreham-by-Sea, Sussex, United Kingdom.
Thistle	United Kingdom	The steamship was driven ashore at Hellevoetsluis, Zeeland, Netherlands. Her crew were rescued. She was on a voyage from Reval, Russia to Rotterdam, South Holland, Netherlands. She was a total loss.
Zelda	United Kingdom	The steamship ran aground on the Maiden Bower Rock, in the Isles of Scilly. She broke in two and sank. All 32 passengers and her crew were rescued. She was on a voyage from Liverpool, Lancashire to Palermo.
Zuleika	United Kingdom	The barque foundered in the Atlantic Ocean. Her crew were rescued by the steamship Tagus (United Kingdom). Trulatha was on a voyage from Leith, Lothian to Quebec City, Canada.

== 16 April ==
List of shipwrecks: 16 April 1874
Ship	State	Description
Alert	United Kingdom	The schooner was driven ashore and wrecked at Hasle, Denmark. Her crew were rescued. She was on a voyage from Hartlepool, County Durham to Königsberg, Germany.
Carl Gustaf	Germany	The schooner was wrecked on Falster, Denmark. Her crew were rescued. She was on a voyage from Västervik, Sweden to Lübeck.
Nederland	Netherlands	The steamship ran aground on the Brigantine Shoal. She was on a voyage from Liverpool, Lancashire, United Kingdom to Philadelphia, Pennsylvania, United States.
Pickwick	United Kingdom	The steamship ran aground in the Danube. She was later refloated.
Triton	United Kingdom	The ship was abandoned in the Atlantic Ocean 50 nautical miles (93 km) north west of the Isles of Scilly. Her crew were rescued by the schooner Divitte (Italy). Triton was on a voyage from Swansea, Glamorgan to Quebec City, Canada.

== 17 April ==
List of shipwrecks: 17 April 1874
Ship	State	Description
Bellona Gerhoa	Norway	The barque was driven ashore and wrecked near Gravenhage, South Holland, Netherlands. Her crew were rescued. She was on a voyage from Fredrikstad to Dordrecht, South Holland.
Carlincraig	United Kingdom	The ship was driven ashore and wrecked. She was on a voyage from Troon, Ayrshire to St. Jago de Cuba, Cuba.
Edel Catharina	Denmark	The schooner was driven ashore on Inchcolm, Fife, United Kingdom. Her crew were rescued.
Gœthe	Germany	The steamship ran aground in the Elbe. She was on a voyage from Hamburg to New York, United States.
Soembing	Netherlands	The ship was sighted in the Indian Ocean whilst on a voyage from Batavia, Netherlands East Indies to Amsterdam, North Holland. No further trace, presumed foundered with the loss of all hands.
Sylphide	Norway	The barque ran aground off Goeree, Zeeland, Netherlands. She was on a voyage from Fredrikstad to Dordrecht, South Holland, Netherlands. She was refloated and found to be leaky.

== 18 April ==
List of shipwrecks: 18 April 1874
Ship	State	Description
Abby Ryerson	United States	The ship was driven ashore at Höganäs, Sweden. Her crew were rescued. She was on a voyage from Mobile, Alabama to Reval, Russia. She was refloated on 4 May and taken in to Helsingør, Denmark.
Albion	New Zealand	The brig stranded near the mouth of the Kaipara Harbour while carrying a load of railway sleepers. She was badly holed and broke her back.
Anne Brooks	United Kingdom	The ship was wrecked in Fox Bay, Falkland Islands. Her crew were rescued.
Eugenia	Norway	The schooner struck the quayside at Fraserburgh, Aberdeenshire, United Kingdom and became waterlogged. She was on a voyage from Porsgrund to Fraserburgh.
Memel Packet	Germany	The steamship ran aground off Rügen.
William and Anthony	United Kingdom	The ship ran aground in Crow Bar Sound, in the Isles of Scilly. She was refloated and found to be severely leaky.
W. L. Burscough	United Kingdom	The ship was driven ashore at Great Yarmouth, Norfolk.

== 20 April ==
List of shipwrecks: 20 April 1874
Ship	State	Description
Francis Borneuf	Canada	The barque put in to Yarmouth, Nova Scotia in a waterlogged condition. She was on a voyage from Saint John, New Brunswick to Glasgow, Renfrewshire, United Kingdom.
Rydall Hall	United States	The 1,780-ton ship sank despite being taken in tow by Queen of the Bay (United Kingdom) while off the Seven Stones Reef. She lost most of her head gear while on her maiden voyage from San Francisco with a general cargo. The packet ship received £150.

== 21 April ==
List of shipwrecks: 21 April 1874
Ship	State	Description
Arabia	United Kingdom	The steamship ran aground in the Rangoon River. She was refloated and resumed her voyage.
De Vries	Germany	The ship was driven ashore near Thisted, Denmark. She was on a voyage from Goole, Yorkshire, United Kingdom to Königsberg.
Gloriana	United Kingdom	The ship ran aground off Domesnes, Russia. She was refloated with assistance and taken in to Bolderāja, Russia.
Louisa	United Kingdom	The brig was driven ashore on the south point of Öland, Sweden. Her crew were rescued. She was on a voyage from Uusikaupunki, Grand Duchy of Finland to "Copmunholm".
Prince Rupert	Canada	The ship collided with Bangalore (United Kingdom) and foundered in the English Channel.
Venadis	Norway	The ship was wrecked on the Kentish Knock. Her crew were rescued. She was on a voyage from a Norwegian port to Dover, Kent, United Kingdom.

== 22 April ==
List of shipwrecks: 22 April 1874
Ship	State	Description
Pearl	United Kingdom	The ship was driven ashore in the Hooghly River.
Queen of Devon	United Kingdom	The ship departed from Bimlipatam, India for London. No further trace, presumed foundered with the loss of all hands.
Rjukan	Russia	The ship was wrecked near Malmö, Sweden. She was on a voyage from Charleston, South Carolina, United States to Riga.

== 23 April ==
List of shipwrecks: 23 April 1874
Ship	State	Description
Knight Templar	United Kingdom	The barque ran aground on the Stag Rocks, off The Lizard, Cornwall. Her crew were rescued. She was on a voyage from Valparaíso, Chile to Falmouth, Cornwall.
Maren Dorothea	Denmark	The brig was driven ashore and wrecked at Præstø.

== 24 April ==
List of shipwrecks: 24 April 1874
Ship	State	Description
Harewood	United Kingdom	The full-rigged ship was driven ashore on Sanda Island, in the Firth of Forth. Her crew were rescued. She was on a voyage from Greenock, Renfrewshire to Quebec City, Canada. She was refloated with the assistance of a tug and taken in tow.
Jessie	United Kingdom	The brigantine was driven ashore in Knock Bay, Wigtownshire. She was on a voyage from Fleetwood, Lancashire to Glasgow, Renfrewshire. She was refloated the next day.
Leader	United Kingdom	The schooner ran aground on the Ooster Bank, off the coast of Zeeland, Netherlands. She was on a voyage from Maryport, Cumberland to Rotterdam, South Holland, Netherlands.
North American	United Kingdom	The ship ran aground on the Lucifer Shoals. She was on a voyage from Liverpool, Lancashire to Hong Kong. She was refloated with assistance from the tug Commodore (United Kingdom) and put back to Liverpool.
Paris	United Kingdom	The steamship ran aground off Domesnes, Russia. She was on a voyage from the Clyde to Riga, Russia.
Silesia	Germany	The steamship ran aground in the Elbe, downstream of Blankenese. She was on a voyage from New York, United States to Hamburg. She was later refloated and taken in to Hamburg.
Speedwell	United Kingdom	The schooner was driven ashore on Sanda Island. She was refloated.

== 25 April ==
List of shipwrecks: 25 April 1874
Ship	State	Description
Brûne	France	The schooner was driven ashore north of Dragør, Denmark. She was on a voyage from Nantes, Loire-Inférieure to Stettin, Germany.
Furness Abbey	United Kingdom	The steamship struck the Bishop Rock, Isles of Scilly and sank. Her twelve crew survived. She was on a voyage from Swansea, Glamorgan to Garston, Lancashire.
Helen Sands	United States	The ship ran aground at New York. She was on a voyage from Livorno, Italy to Philadelphia, Pennsylvania.
Minerva	United Kingdom	The steamship was driven ashore at Donaghadee, County Down. She was on a voyage from Dublin to Glasgow, Renfrewshire.
Regent	United Kingdom	The full-rigged ship was driven ashore and wrecked on Faial Island, Azores. Her crew were rescued. She was on a voyage from Queenstown, County Cork to Saint John, New Brunswick, Canada.
Somersetshire	United Kingdom	The steamship ran aground at Plymouth, Devon. She was on a voyage from London to Melbourne, Victoria. She was refloated with assistance from the steamship Scotia (United Kingdom) and taken in to Plymouth.

== 26 April ==
List of shipwrecks: 26 April 1874
Ship	State	Description
Newry	United Kingdom	The steamship was driven ashore at Warrenpoint, County Antrim. She was refloated and towed in to Warrenpoint.
Washington Booth	Nicaragua	The ship was driven ashore and wrecked at "Coravieles". She was on a voyage from Liverpool, Lancashire, United Kingdom to Valparaíso, Chile.

== 27 April ==
List of shipwrecks: 27 April 1874
Ship	State	Description
Arethusa	United Kingdom	The barque collided with the steamship Cingalese (United Kingdom) and foundered in the Atlantic Ocean 50 to 60 nautical miles (93 to 111 km) north of Cape Finisterre, Spain with the loss of eight of her ten crew. The survivors were rescued by Cingalese. Arethusa was on a voyage from Smyrna, Ottoman Empire to Nantes, Loire-Inférieure, France.
City of London	United Kingdom	The barque foundered in the Atlantic Ocean. Her crew were rescued by Lady Mary (United Kingdom). City of London was on a voyage from Saint Helena to Falmouth, Cornwall.
Haabet	Norway	The brig foundered in the Atlantic Ocean. Her crew were rescued by the barque Margaret (Norway).
Heron	United Kingdom	The steamship struck a rock off Cellardyke, Fife. Her passengers were taken off. She was on a voyage from London to Granton, Lothian. She was refloated and completed her voyage.
James Dunnett	United Kingdom	The schooner was driven ashore on the Isle of May, Fife. Her crew were rescued.
Lancastria	United Kingdom	The ship was damaged by fire at Antigua.
Margaretta	United Kingdom	The schooner exploded at Cardiff, Glamorgan. A crew member was injured.
Perseverance	United Kingdom	The schooner ran aground on the Mouse Sand, in the Thames Estuary. Her crew were rescued.
Primo	Germany	The ship collided with the steamship John Wells (United Kingdom). She was on a voyage from Memel to Bristol, Gloucestershire, United Kingdom. She was towed in to Grimsby, Lincolnshire in a waterlogged condition by John Wells.
Strathearn	United Kingdom	The ship was driven ashore at Bettystown, County Meath. She was on a voyage from Liverpool to Africa. She was refloated and resumed her voyage.
Thor	Sweden	The schooner ran aground on the Longscar Rocks, off the coast of County Durham, United Kingdom. She was refloated with assistance from the tugs Conqueror and William Charles (both United Kingdom).

== 28 April ==
List of shipwrecks: 28 April 1874
Ship	State	Description
Lady Stanley	United Kingdom	The steamship was driven ashore on Hveen, Sweden. She was on a voyage from Cardiff, Glamorgan to Danzig, Germany. She was refloated with assistance.

== 29 April ==
List of shipwrecks: 29 April 1874
Ship	State	Description
England	United Kingdom	The full-rigged ship ran aground 4 nautical miles (7.4 km) south by east of the North Brother Rock, Queensland and was severely damaged. She was on a voyage from Sydney, New South Wales to Singapore, Straits Settlements.

== Unknown date ==
List of shipwrecks: Unknown date in April 1874
Ship	State	Description
Abeona	United Kingdom	The ship was driven ashore at Start Point, near Bridgwater, Somerset.
Alert	United Kingdom	The ship was abandoned in the Atlantic Ocean. Her crew were rescued. She was on a voyage from the Clyde to Jamaica.
Alice	United Kingdom	The ship was lost off Point Godavery, India.
Anne Veil	Canada	The ship was abandoned at Barbados.
Ann Musgrave	United Kingdom	The schooner ran aground and capsized off Wigtown. She was on a voyage from Wigtown to Liverpool, Lancashire.
Aureliana	United Kingdom	The ship was wrecked on the Larandovas Shoal. She was on a voyage from Liverpool to Havana, Cuba.
Bell Flower	United Kingdom	The barque caught fire at Mauritius.
Braemar Castle	United Kingdom	The steamship ran aground in the Hooghly River at Calcutta, India. She was refloated.
Brierley Hill	United Kingdom	The ship ran aground in the Hellegat. She was on a voyage from Iquique, Peru to Rotterdam, South Holland, Netherlands.
Brothers	United Kingdom	The schooner was damaged by fire at Waterford.
Burlington	United Kingdom	The steamship ran aground off Smyrna, Ottoman Empire.
Calcutta	United Kingdom	The steamship was run into by the steamship Galatea (Austria-Hungary and sank at Calcutta. Her crew were rescued.
Christabel	United Kingdom	The ship was driven ashore on the south point of Öland, Sweden. She was on a voyage from Sunderland, County Durham to Stockholm, Sweden. She was refloated with assistance and resumed her voyage.
Chrysolite	United Kingdom	The barque was wrecked on Mauritius with some loss of life.
Cubana	United Kingdom	The barque was driven ashore 10 nautical miles (19 km) south of San Antonio, Chile. She was on a voyage from Caldera, Chile to the Llico River. She was refloated.
Eclair	France	The steamship struck a sunken rock and sank with the loss of two of her crew.
Eliza Maria	United Kingdom	The ship was wrecked on the Animas Rock. She was on a voyage from Newcastle upon Tyne, Northumberland to Venice, Italy.
Eulalia	United States	The ship was wrecked at San Sebastián . She was on a voyage from New Orleans, Louisiana to San Sebastián.
Fairy Queen	United Kingdom	The schooner foundered off Valentia Island, County Cork between 16 and 20 April with the loss of all hands. She was on a voyage from Ipswich, Suffolk to Tralee, County Kerry.
Fram	Norway	The full-rigged ship foundered in the Atlantic Ocean. Her crew were rescued by Erstahinger (Norway). Fram was on a voyage from Liverpool to Halifax, Nova Scotia, Canada.
Frederick Lange	United Kingdom	The brig was driven ashore at Almería, Spain. Her crew were rescued. She was on a voyage from Trapani, Sicily, Italy to Tromsø.
F. T. Barry	United Kingdom	The steamship collided with Amérique (France) whilst taking the latter under tow and was severely damaged. She was on a voyage from Pomaron, Portugal to Newcastle upon Tyne. She completed her voyage and was placed under repair.
Georgine	United Kingdom	The ship was wrecked on the coast of Rügen, Germany.
Griffin	United Kingdom	The barque was driven ashore on Stronsay, Orkney Islands. She was refloated on 7 April and towed in to Kirkwall.
Harmonie	Flag unknown	The ship was driven ashore at Hela, Germany.
Hazard	Norway	The schooner capsized at sea. She was towed in to "Haistensund".
Hilda	United Kingdom	The steamship was driven ashore at Cape Takil, Russia. She was on a voyage from Newport, Monmouthshire to Taganrog, Russia.
Hoppet	Denmark	The ship was driven ashore at Cape Arkona, Germany. Her crew were rescued. She was on a voyage from Copenhagen to a Finnish port.
Infanta	Norway	The ship capsized and drove ashore at Thisted, Denmark.
Jenny Lind	United Kingdom	The ship was driven ashore at Kingstown, County Dublin. She was on a voyage from Burntisland, Fife to Dublin.
Leo	Flag unknown	The schooner collided with the steamship Jupiter (Germany) and sank in Christianiafjord.
Liberty	United Kingdom	The steamship was driven ashore at Padstow, Cornwall.
Ludwig Holberg	Norway	The brig was abandoned in the North Sea 50 nautical miles (93 km) off the Danish coast. Her crew were rescued.
Maclaren	Sweden	The steamship was driven ashore 40 nautical miles (74 km) south of "Pensee". Her crew were rescued. She was on a voyage from Stettin, Germany to Riga, Russia.
Margaret	United Kingdom	The schooner was driven ashore at Moville, County Donegal.
Mary Lawson	United Kingdom	The schooner was driven ashore at San Sebastián with the loss of three of her crew.
Minna	United Kingdom	The ship was abandoned at sea. Her crew were rescued. She was on a voyage from South Shields, County Durham to Gothenburg, Sweden.
shipMississippi	United Kingdom	The steamship was driven ashore on "Fog Island", Louisiana, United States. Her crew were rescued. She was on a voyage from Liverpool to New Orleans.
Montevideo	Flag unknown	The steamship was lost. Her crew were rescued by Constance (Sweden). Montevideo was on a voyage from the River Plate to Rangoon, Burma.
Niphon	Mexico	The ship was wrecked at Alvarado. She was on a voyage from Veracruz to Alvarado.
Novelty	United States	The brig sprang a leak and foundered. She was on a voyage from the West Indies to Boston, Massachusetts.
Ospray	(Dominion of Newfoundland) Newfoundland Colony	The steam sealer was sunk in ice during a gale off the coast of the Newfoundland Colony.
Ouse	United Kingdom	The schooner was driven ashore near Lemvig, Denmark in a waterlogged conditio. Her crew were rescued. She was on a voyage from Sunderland to Memel, Germany.
Picard	France	The abandoned barque was driven ashore on Mauritius.
Ragna	United Kingdom	The ship ran aground at New York, United States. She was on a voyage from New Orleans, Louisiana, United States to Cork.
Rap	Norway	The derelict sloop was towed in to Farsund.
Rieborg	Germany	The ship was driven ashore at Cape Arkona. Her crew were rescued. She was on a voyage from Königsberg to "Wordingberg".
Runnymede	United Kingdom	The ship was damaged by fire at Pernambuco, Brazil before 14 April. She was on a voyage from Brisbane, Queensland to London.
Segler	Germany	The brig ran aground at Memel before 9 April. She was on a voyage from Memel to Sunderland. She was refloated and resumed her voyage, but consequently put in to Copenhagen, Denmark in a leaky condition.
Sempiternel	France	The barque caught fire at Mauritius.
Success	United Kingdom	The ship was driven ashore. She was on a voyage from Danzig, Germany to Liverpool She was refloated and put in to Helsingør, Denmark.
Venus	United Kingdom	The ship was driven ashore near Ballycastle. Her crew were rescued.
Victor	United Kingdom	The schooner was wrecked on the Pallister Reef, off Barbuda. She was on a voyage from Rio de Janeiro, Brazil to Savannah, Georgia, United States.
Zwei Bruder	Germany	The ship was driven ashore on Rügen with the loss of two of her crew. She was on a voyage from Königsberg to "Veile".
Unnamed	Norway	The schooner was abandoned in the North Sea. She was towed in to Berwick upon Tweed, Northumberland by the brig Roman Express (United Kingdom).
