= Hercules (1792 ship) =

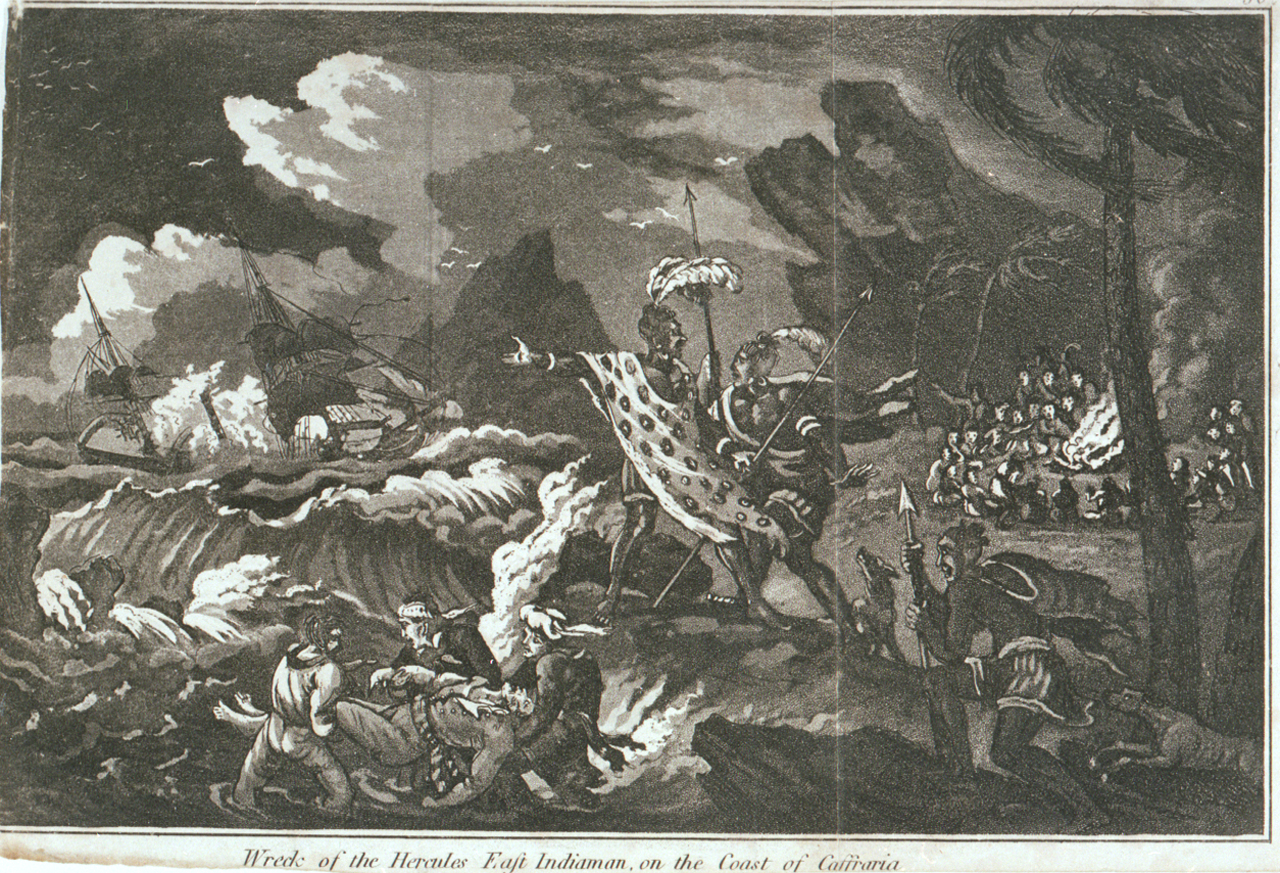
- Wreck of the Hercules East Indiaman, on the Coast of Caffraria

History

United States
- Name: Hercules
- Namesake: Hercules
- Builder: New England
- Launched: 1792
- Fate: Wrecked 1796

General characteristics
- Tons burthen: 600, or 628 (bm)

Hercules was built in New England in 1792. She was an American East Indiaman that in 1796 the British East India Company (EIC) hired in India to carry rice from Bengal to England. She was wrecked in June 1796.

Hercules appeared in the 1795 volume of Lloyd's Register.

Year	Master	Owner	Trade	Source
1795	Benjamin Stout	Ed. Jones	London–Madeira	LR

The EIC hired Hercules in Bengal to carry rice to England. She was carrying the rice on behalf of the British government, which was importing grain to address high prices for wheat in Britain following a poor harvest.

Hercules sailed from Calcutta on 17 March 1796. On 16 June she wrecked at Kaffraria, on the East Coast of Africa, north of the Cape of Good Hope. Thirteen of her crew drowned; the survivors reached the Cape. Captain Stout later wrote an account of his adventures, though much of his account of the region through which he travelled came in for criticism as being a fabrication. The EIC charged the loss of the cargo to "His Majesty's Government".
