= Rambler (1792 ship) =

British merchant ship 1792–1808

History

Great Britain
- Name: Rambler
- Builder: Ing. Eskdale
- Launched: 1792
- Fate: Condemned circa February 1808

General characteristics
- Tons burthen: 343, or 346 (bm)
- Length: 103 ft 10 in (31.6 m)
- Beam: 28 ft 7 in (8.7 m)
- Complement: 1799:36
- Armament: 1795: 6 × 6-pounder guns; 1799: 18 × 6&12&18-pounder cannons + 4 swivel guns; 1799: 16 × 12-pounder guns; 1805: 8 × 18–pounder & 8 × 6–pounder guns of "the New Construction"; 1806: 2 × 6-pounder guns

Rambler was launched at Whitby in 1792. She was a transport and West Indiaman, though she made a voyage to Smyrna before returning to the West Indies trade. She was condemned at Antigua in early 1808, having been damaged while sailing from Jamaica to London.

== Career ==
Rambler first appeared in Lloyd's Register in 1795.

Year	Master	Owner	Trade	Source
1795	H.Charter	Js.Atty	Cowes transport	LR
1797	H.Charter; Whytock	Js.Atty; Lushington	Cowes transport London–Demerara	LR

In 1797, her ownership changed and her new owners moved her registration to London.

Year	Master	Owner	Trade	Source & notes
1799	Whytock	Lushington	London–Demerara	LR; damages repaired 1799

On 6 July 1799, Captain George Whytock acquired a letter of marque.

Year	Master	Owner	Trade	Source & notes
1800	Whytock	Geddes & Co.	London–Martinique; London–Suriname	LR; damages repaired 1799
1802	Whytock; J.Smith	Geddes & Co. Doveas & Co.	London–Suriname; London–Smyrna	LR; damages repaired 1799
1805	J.Smith; G.Allen	Doveas & Co. J.Annen	London–Smyrna; London–Barbados	LR; damages repaired 1799 & thorough repair 1805
1806	G.Allen; C.Williams	J.Annen	London–Barbados	LR; thorough repair 1805 & 1806
1807	C.Williams	J.Annen	London–Jamaica	LR; thorough repair 1805 & 1806

== Fate ==
On 4 January 1808, Rambler, Williams, master, which had been sailing from Jamaica to London when she had been seen at 40°N 49°W, in great distress. She had cut away her main and mizzen masts and was bearing away for the Western Island (the Azores). She was next reported to have put into Antigua. She was condemned there.

Her entry in the LR volume for 1809 carried the entry "condemned" by her name.
