= Resource (1798 ship) =

English ship from the 18th century

History

Great Britain
- Name: Resource
- Launched: 1792, or 1797, Bermuda
- Captured: December 1805

General characteristics
- Tons burthen: 200, or 236 (bm)
- Complement: 20
- Armament: 1801:10 × 6-pounder guns; 1806:16 × 6-pounder guns
- Notes: Pitch pine sides; lengthened and repaired 1797 or 1798

Resource was launched at Bermuda in 1792, possibly under another name, and sailed from Liverpool from 1798 on. She made four voyages as a slave ship in the triangular trade in enslaved people. The French Navy captured her in 1805 at the very beginning of her fifth voyage. However, the British recaptured her when her captors sent her into the Cape of Good Hope, not realising that the Royal Navy was capturing the Cape.

== Career ==
Resource first appeared in Lloyd's Register (LR) in 1798. She appeared in the Register of Shipping in 1800, the first year it was published. The Register of Shipping showed Resource as having been built in 1797, in Bermuda.

Year	Master	Owner	Trade	Source & notes
1798	E.Clark	Tarleton	Liverpool–Africa	LR; lengthened 1797

1st enslaving voyage (1798–1799): Captain Edward Clark sailed from Liverpool 2 April 1798. Resource acquired captives at Malembo. She arrived at Kingston on 6 December with 363 captives. She sailed for Liverpool on 12 February 1799 and arrived back there on 9 April. She had sailed from Liverpool with 42 crew members and suffered three crew deaths on the voyage.

2nd enslaving voyage (1799–1800): Captain Clark sailed from Liverpool on 11 August 1799. She acquired her captives at Malembo and arrived at Kingston on 30 April 1800 with 359 captives. She sailed for Liverpool on 21 July and arrived back there on 21 September. She had left Liverpool with 35 crew members and suffered six crew deaths on the voyage.

3rd slave trading voyage (1801–1802): Captain Edward Clark acquired a letter of marque on 25 March 1801. He sailed from Liverpool on 15 April. Resource acquired captives in Africa and arrived at Trinidad on 1 June 1802 with 251 captives. She sailed from Trinidad on 1 August and arrived back at Liverpool on 22 September. She had left Liverpool with 32 crew members and she suffered 11 crew deaths on the voyage.

Year	Master	Owner	Trade	Source
1804	E.Clarke; J.Critney	Rigg&Co. M'Dowell&Co.	Liverpool-Africa	LR

It is not clear where Resource sailed in 1803–1804. She did not appear in Lloyd's List's ship arrival and departure (SAD) data during those years.

4th enslaving voyage (1804–1805): Captain Thomas Moffitt sailed from Liverpool 4 November 1804. She acquired her captives at the Congo River and sailed from Africa on 21 March 1805. She arrived at Charleston on 11 May with 251 captives. She sailed from Charleston on 11 May and arrived back at Liverpool on 22 June. She left Liverpool with 32 crew members and suffered three crew deaths on the voyage.

Year	Master	Owner	Trade	Source
1805	J.Cretney; E.Almon	M'Dowal	Liverpool–Africa	LR
1806	E.Alman	M'Dowall	Liverpool–Africa	LR

5th enslaving voyage and capture: Captain Enock Almon sailed from Liverpool on 16 September 1805.

Admiral Linois's squadron was on its way back to France from the Indian Ocean when it captured Rolla on either 22 November 1805 or 5 December. On 18 April 1806 Lloyd's List (LL) reported that a privateer had captured Rolla, of Liverpool, and another vessel, off Loango. The other vessel was Resource, of Liverpool, which Marengo, Linois's flagship, had captured on 8 December off the coast of Africa. Marengo had sent Resource to the Cape of Good Hope, not realising that the British were about to capture the Cape. By one account, Resource arrived on 27 January 1806 and was captured then. By another account, she had arrived at the Cape and was sold there, only to fall prey to the arriving British force. Diomede and Encounter captured Resource as she approached Table Bay. Interrogation of the people on Resource and examination of private letters gave Commodore Home Riggs Popham an insight into Linois's plans, information Popham passed on to the Admiralty and that influenced Popham's preparations at the Cape Colony, should Linois arrive.

In 1805, 30 British enslaving vessels were lost, 13 of them on the coast of Africa. During the period 1793 to 1807, war, rather than maritime hazards or resistance by the captives, was the greatest cause of vessel losses among British enslaving vessels.

The Lloyd's Register volume for 1807 carried the annotation "captured" by her name.
