= Bangalore (1792 ship) =

British merchant ship built in India 1792–1802

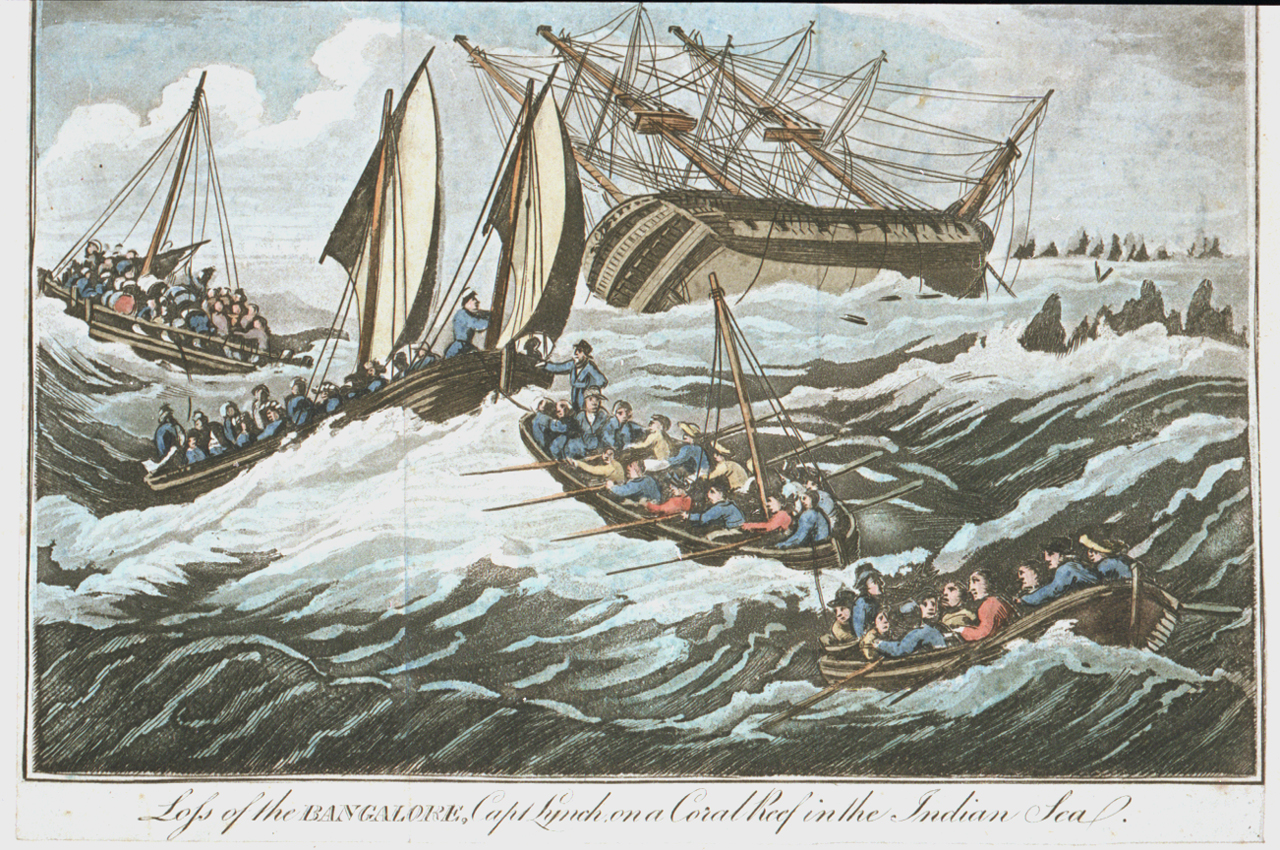
- Loss of the Bangalore, Capt Lynch, on a Coral Reef in the Indian Sea, Thomas Tegg, National Maritime Museum, Greenwich

History

Great Britain
- Name: Banglore
- Namesake: Bangalore
- Owner: Tullock (or Tulloch) & Co.
- Builder: G. Gillett, Calcutta
- Launched: 1792
- Fate: Wrecked 12 April 1802

General characteristics
- Tons burthen: 206, or 291, or 298, or 400 (bm)
- Propulsion: Sail
- Armament: 10 × 6-pounder guns

Bangalore was built in Calcutta in 1792 and took on British registry in 1797 after having made a voyage from Bengal to London under charter to the British East India Company (EIC). She then traded between London and India. She was wrecked in 1802 in the Flores Sea.

== Career ==
On 20 August 1792 Bangalore was under the command of Captain Wilson when a heavy gale drove her across the tail of the Saugor Sand. Charts that accurately described water depths enabled Wilson to navigate into Channel Creek and then to safety in Randall's Cove.

Under the command of Captain James Frayer, Bangalore was at Calcutta on 15 February 1796 and left Bengal on 22 March. She reached Saint Helena on 4 July and Crookhaven on 27 November, before arriving at Blackwall on 17 December.

Bangalore was admitted to the Registry of Great Britain on 17 February 1797. She entered Lloyd's Register in 1798 with J. Friar, master, and Tullock, owner.

One record has Bangalore sailing to Bengal and return between 16 January 1797 and 19 December 1798.

The New Oriental Register... in 1802 gave her master and owner as Francis Lynch.

== Fate ==
Bangalore was wrecked on 12 April 1802. She was under the command of Captain Lynch and nine days out from Amboyna. Survivors in the pinnace and jolly boats reached Sourabaya. The Dutch received them kindly and later sent them on to Batavia. (Note: This information is from Thomas Teggs's "Account of Shipwrecks".) The wreck may have occurred on "Jagger's Reef" ("Bangalore Shoal") around 7°40′S 121°13′E in the Flores Sea.

Although the wreck occurred in 1802, Lloyd's Register carried an (unchanged) entry for her to 1805, and the Register of Shipping did so to 1806.
