= Roehampton (1798 ship) =

History

Great Britain
- Name: Roehampton
- Namesake: Roehampton
- Launched: 1792, America
- Fate: Foundered 1806 - no trace

General characteristics
- Tons burthen: 104, or 106 (bm)
- Sail plan: Brig
- Complement: 25
- Armament: 1798: 6 × 3-pounder guns; 1805: 14 × 4&6-pounder guns

Roehampton was a ship built in the United States in 1792, possibly in Baltimore, and almost certainly under another name. Between 1798 and 1803 she traded between England and North America. From 1803 she made two complete voyages as a slave ship in the triangular trade in enslaved people. She disappeared on her way home on her third.

== Career ==
Roehampton first appeared in Lloyd's Register (LR) in 1798.

Year	Master	Owner	Trade	Source
1798	A.Sinclair	A.Mann	London–Baltimore	LR; small repair 1793
1800	A.Sinclair; W.Hill	A.Mann; P.Pinsent	Cork–London; London–Newfoundland	LR; small repair 1793, repairs 1799, & good repair 1802
1802	W.Hill; Codner	Pinsent	London–Newfoundland; Dartmouth–Newfoundland	LR; small repair 1793, repairs 1799, & good repair 1802
1803	Codner; Thompson	LeCoq & Co.f	Dartmouth–Newfoundland; Liverpool–Africa	LR; small repair 1793, repairs 1799, & good repair 1802

1st enslaving voyage (1803–1805): Captain William Thompson sailed from Liverpool on 9 December 1802. Roehampton arrived at Suriname with her captives on 16 July 1803. She arrived back at Liverpool on 17 September. She had left Liverpool with 13 crew members and she suffered no crew deaths on her voyage.

2nd enslaving voyage (1803–1805): Captain William Thompson sailed from Liverpool on 16 November 1803. Roehampton acquired her captives at Gabon; while she was there her boats were fired on from the shore. She arrived at Suriname on 3 September 1804 with 130 captives. She sailed from Suriname on 1 October and arrived back at Liverpool on 7 January. She had left Liverpool with 22 crew members and she suffered seven crew deaths on the voyage.

She returned to Liverpool with 525 bags of coffee, 700 billets of barwood, and 112 elephant teeth (ivory tusks).

3rd slave voyage (1805–loss): Captain Edward Newby acquired a letter of marque on 8 February 1805. He sailed from Liverpool on 1 March and arrived at St Thomas in December.

== Fate ==
Roehampton, Atkinson, master, sailed from St Thomas on 9 February 1806 in company with Neptune, Wilson, master. The two vessels parted company on 15 March in a heavy gale. Neptune arrived at Lancaster. Roehampton apparently did not return. Roehampton did not appear again in Lloyd's List or other newspapers that published ship arrival and departure data.

In 1806, 33 British slave ships were lost. The source for this information does not record any having been lost on their way home. During the period 1793 to 1807, war, rather than maritime hazards or resistance by the captives, was the greatest cause of vessel losses among British slave vessels.
